= Gloria Calero Sierra =

Mexican artist (1906–1990)

Gloria Calero Sierra (1906–1990) was a Mexican artist and the wife of artist Federico Cantú Garza. Her work was influenced by surrealism and Mexican muralism.

== Art ==
Calero began her art career when she was thirty years old. Her major influences were the artists of the surrealism movement and Mexican muralism. She stated that one of her biggest influences was the work of Jesús Guerrero Galván.

She was a founding member of the Salón de la Plástica Mexicana, which was one of the first exhibitors of her work.

Her work can be found in collections such as those of MacKinley Helm, Ali Chumacero, Licio Lagos, Bernard Lewin, and the Cantú family.

== Biography ==
Calero was born in 1906 during the Porfirio Díaz regime, into a liberal and well-connected family. She was the granddaughter of Justo Sierra and cousin of Javier Barros Sierra . Her parents were Manuel Calero and Luz Sierra de Calero, who supported her artistic inclinations. Her family's wealth and social status made it relatively easy to develop her talent early. She was educated in the fine arts and culture, and learned to speak English fluently.

During her childhood, she lost her hearing due to an illness.

She married a distant cousin, Chano Urueta, who was a film actor and director. With Cordelia Urueta, she frequented cafes and other places popular with artists and writers, such as Renato Leduc, Xavier Villaurrutia, and Luís Cardoza y Aragón. After her friend Inés Amor opened a gallery in 1936, Calero met many artists of the Mexican muralism movement, and others such as the poets Antonin Artaud and José Moreno Villa.

In the early 1930s, Calero and Urueta decided to move to the Colonia del Valle neighborhood, to a small house on San Francisco Street. Her landlady and neighbor, Luisa Garza, introduced her to painters and to other friends of her son, Federico Cantú Garza. Cantú and Calero began an affair that ended her marriage after various confrontations. The two married on June 12, 1937, a second marriage for both.

From 1938 to 1941, Calero and Cantú lived in New York City and later moved to San Miguel de Allende, dividing their time between Mexico and the United States. They were considered inseparable, and her image appeared in Cantú's work, such as the Los Altares sculpture at the Secretaría de Comunicaciones y Transportes.

After Cantú's death in 1989, Calero fell into depression and months later had a blood clot which required amputation of a limb. She died in 1990.

== See also ==
- Mexican art
- Visual arts of Mexico
