= Anne Walsh =

American visual artist (born 1962)

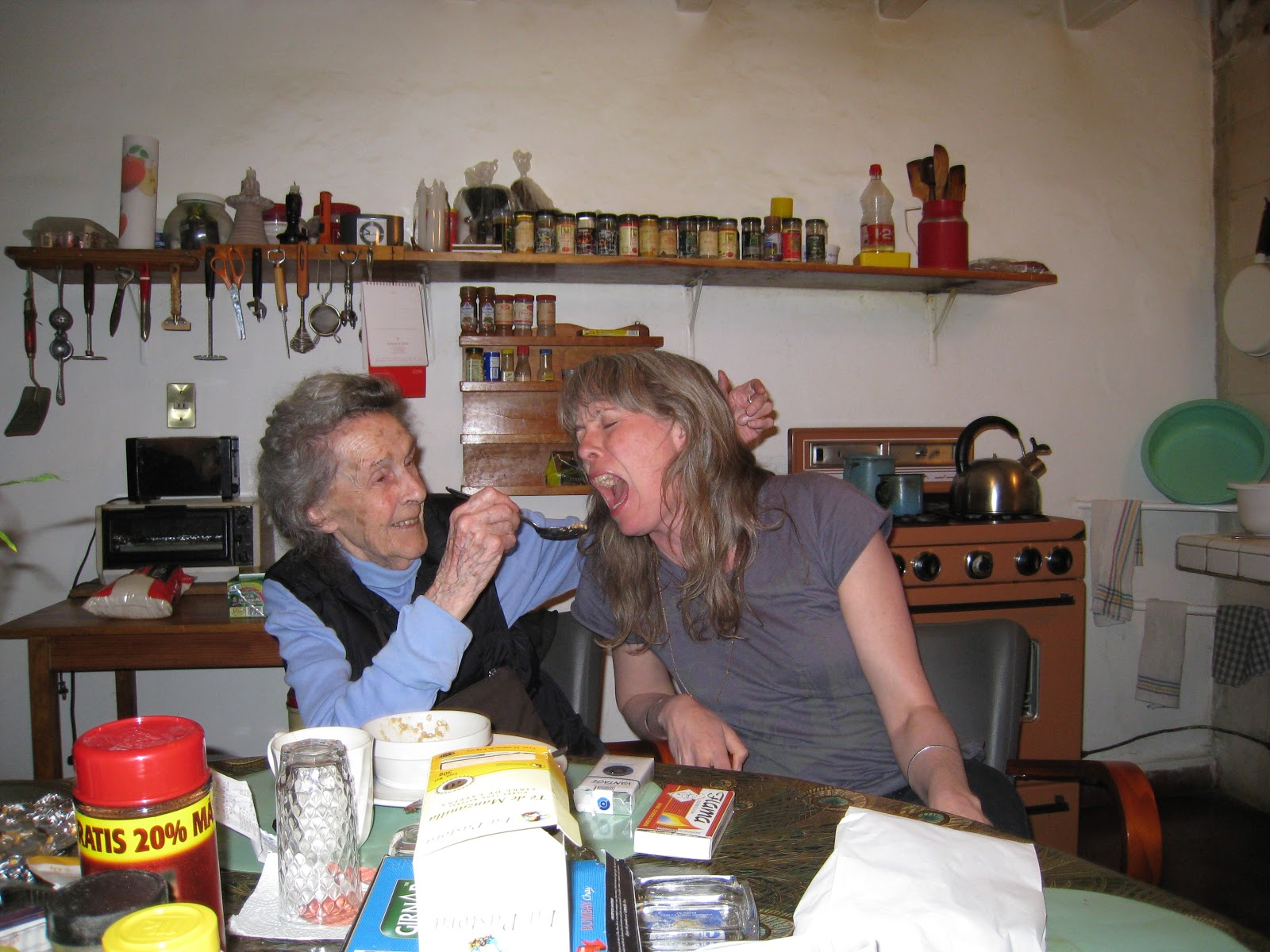
Image from the book Hello Leonora, Soy Anne Walsh

Anne Walsh (born 1962, New York City) is an American visual artist, art editor, curator and teacher. She works with video, performance, audio, photography, and text. Her works often re-mediate the works and lives of other artists and her own family. Walsh has said that her artistic medium is “study.” Walsh's book Hello Leonora, Soy Anne Walsh (2019, no place press/MIT Press) epitomizes the aggressively indexical, personal, and analytical nature of her practice. A visual and written ‘adaptation’ of Leonora Carrington's 1950 fantastical feminist novella The Hearing Trumpet, the book traces Walsh's decade-long, multi-part response to the novella—including meeting the author and corresponding with her. Other recent adaptations include Walsh's live performances with poet Jocelyn Saidenberg of Camille Roy's play Sometimes Dead is Better, and her video installation Anthem, in which Walsh performed, with a troupe of Oakland elders, the Oscar-winning song Let It Go, from the 2014 Disney film Frozen.

In addition to exhibiting her work nationally and internationally, Walsh is associate professor of art practice at University of California, Berkeley.

== Biography ==
Anne Walsh was born in 1962, in New York City. She graduated from the University of Michigan, Ann Arbor (BA degree), and the California Institute of the Arts (MFA degree).

Walsh is associate professor of New Genres in the Department of Art Practice at University of California, Berkeley, where she teaches video, graduate studies, and critical theory.

She has curated exhibitions for OR Gallery, Vancouver; the Beall Center for Art and Culture at University of California, Irvine; the Los Angeles Center for Photographic Studies; New Langton Arts, San Francisco, and others.

Walsh was an editor of X-Tra Contemporary Art Quarterly from 1997 to 2004, and has contributed criticism, reviews, and interviews regularly to the magazine. She is now a contributing editor to the publication.

Walsh concerns herself with language and time. And whereas the Met enshrines the traditional media of canonical art history—painting, sculpture, and physical artifact—Walsh instead makes innovative use of video, sound, and software to create art that, inherently ephemeral, resists the pull of the pedestal.

By breaking down language and sensory experience into microscopic parts, divorced from any immediate physical or social context, her pieces have been called weird or disorienting. But over time, unlikely intimations of familiarity emerge.

== Solo exhibitions ==
- An Annotated Hearing Trumpet, Preface and Figures (2012), Martina Johnston, Berkeley, California.
- Apprentice Crone's Hearing Trumpet (2015), Commonwealth and Council, Los Angeles, California. This exhibition was a gallery-based notebook devoted to imagining a film version of Leonora Carrington's book The Hearing Trumpet.
- They (2017) The Luggage Store Gallery, San Francisco, California. Walsh exhibited the process behind Hello Leonora, Soy Anne Walsh in They, which SFGate called “Surreal Documents” about the “very personal project for the artist, and absorbing on that psychological level.”

== Exhibition history ==
Walsh's works have been shown at the Whitney Museum of American Art; the Museum of Contemporary Art, Los Angeles; the J. Paul Getty Museum; Laboratorium, Antwerp, Belgium; MUU gallery, Helsinki; Tredje Spooret, Stockholm; the Royal College of Art, London; Lothringer 13, Munich; Walter Phillips Gallery at the Banff Centre for the Arts, Alberta, Huis a/d Werf, Utrecht, Netherlands, Finland, Casey Kaplan, New York City, and numerous other galleries and festivals in Europe, Japan, and North and South America.

DoubleArchive: New Work Satellite Gallery, UTSA, San Antonio, TX, 2007 Part of Walsh's earlier set of works, DoubleArchive was a collaboration with Chris Kubick that utilized commercial sound effect libraries and titling them in ways that were both singular and broadly referential, highlighting “the disjunction between source, sound, and function.”

== Works in sound ==
=== Art After Death (2001–2005) ===
Art after Death, in which Anne Walsh and Chris Kubick interview dead artists through conducting conversations with professional spirit mediums in front of the work of the deceased artist. The resulting series of audio CDs, Conversations with the Countess of Castiglione, Yves Klein Speaks! and Visits with Joseph Cornell, are a kind of portraiture, but one in which the artist's role is as navigators of a complex set of layered, cultural, biographical, critical, and paranormal histories. Visits with Joseph Cornell (2002) CD with accompanying 16-page booklet, featuring spirit mediums Adam Bernstein, Valerie Winbourne, Clyde Derrick, Paula Roberts, and Karl Ptery. This CD was partially funded by the Whitney Museum of American Art and was produced in conjunction with the 2002 Whitney Biennial. Yves Klein Speaks! (2002) CD with accompanying 8 page booklet, featuring spirit mediums Valerie Winborn, Karen Lundegaard, Liane Crawford and Robert Grey. This cd was recorded on location at the Menil Collection, Houston TX; SFMOMA, San Francisco, CA; and at the home of an anonymous collector in New York City.

In Full Metal Jackets (2005), which is a sculptural sound installation exhibited in multiple locations, was first commissioned by the Yerba Buena Center for the Arts in San Francisco, 28 speakers connected by a tangled web of wire hang scattered across a multi-story expanse of blank white wall. An oddly soothing rain of sound echoes through the room: metallic pings, rattles, and clatters, some sharp, some soft. At the base of the wall, white text scrolls up the screen of a computer monitor, revealing the names of the audio files producing the sounds—among them "44 Magnum Bullet Casing Concrete Drop"; "Bullet Cartridge, Ball M9, drop to wood"; and "multishell barrage for liquid bullet effect"—some 200 sounds in all.

Walsh created the piece with her then-husband, artist and sound designer Chris Kubick. Along with 100 sounds already in the couple's vast sound effect library, they recorded 100 new sounds using an enormous bag of bullet casings collected at a local gun club, dropping them against different surfaces around their Oakland home. Walsh views the piece as a taxonomy of sorts, "reading the world as an archive of sound."

=== Issue 2 (2007) ===
Issue 2 is a rubber doorstop, or wedge featured in The Thing Quarterly. On the top surface of the wedge, set into the surface of the wedge, was a note from a young Anne Walsh, written in 1973, to the tennis star Billie Jean King. The note was a fan letter sent to Billie Jean King, just after she had beat Bobby Riggs in the Battle of the Sexes Tennis Match.

=== Room Tone (2007) 4-channel audio installation, variable duration ===
A room tone is a recorded element of sound design, often employed in the movie industry, to impress the sonic ambience of a depicted environment. It is the sound of “silence” in a room, though never quite silent as each room tone is inflected by different characteristics such as sonic reflections bouncing off physical architecture, the absorptive presence of bodies, and other kinds of technology present (i.e., the subtle hum of air-handling systems and lights). Room Tone is run by a computer program that generates sounds drawn from a database of approximately 1,000 room tones through four separate channels. The program may layer, cut up, and combine these room tones, varying in duration and volume, to create a new, dynamic, and visceral room tone for any particular space. Constantly changing and evolving, the aural experience of Room Tone humorously plays with the oft-cited adage of John Cage: “There is no such thing as an empty space or an empty time. There is always something to see, something to hear. In fact, try as we may to make a silence, we cannot.”

== Performance ==
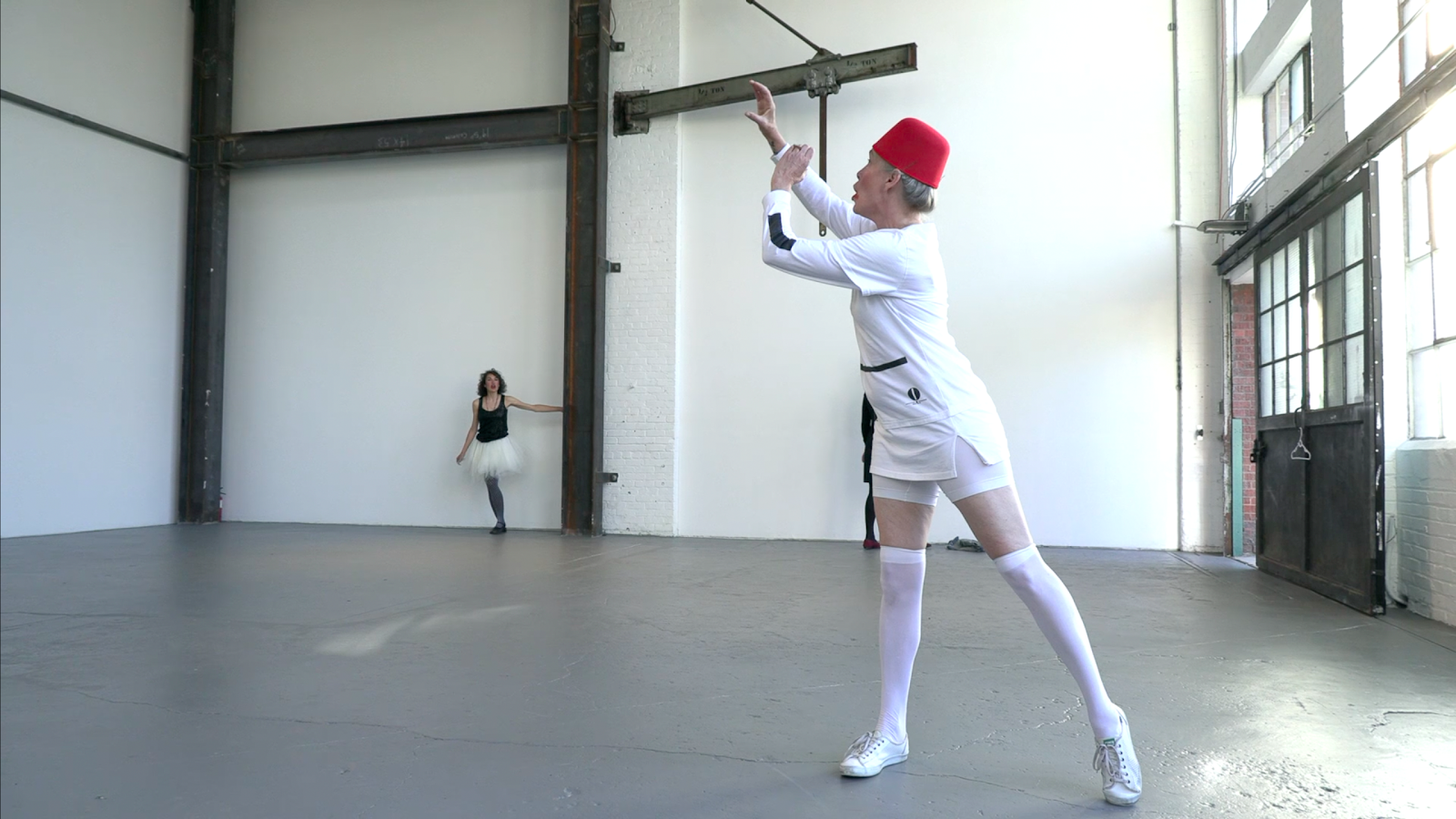
Dead Sometimes, Project Artaud, San Francisco, June 28–30, 2018

- And What's More, The Lab, San Francisco, June 2019; Walsh gave a live performance commissioned by Claudia LaRocco on the publication of her novel of the same name. The Lab wrote, “Claudia La Rocco's And What’s More is a literary, performance, art, and sound project that plays with traditional audience/maker/doer relationships.” LaRocco wrote, “Anne just spent a bunch of years making a book into an exploded studio into a performance back into a book. For this performance, if that’s what it will be, she’s teamed up with writer, artist, and performer Leena Joshi.”
- Dead Sometimes, Project Artaud, San Francisco, June 28–30, 2018; with Jocelyn Saidenberg, Howard Fisher, Kathryn Crim
- Sometimes Dead is Better (POET’S THEATRE AT BAM/PFA), For Communal Presence, New Narrative Writing Today conference, U.C. Berkeley
- Joyous Forms of Address, presented at Directions for a Cloud-Crowd, with Michael Swaine and Jim Melchert, Henry Art Gallery, Seattle, April 2016
- Joyous Forms of Address, presented at Directions Given, Directions Taken, Southern Exposure Gallery, San Francisco, October 2015

== Discography ==
- Visits with Joseph Cornell, audio CD, volume 3 of Art After Death, collaboration with Chris Kubick, produced under the name of ARCHIVE, release date March 2004
- Yves Klein Speaks, audio cd, volume 2 of Art After Death, collaboration with Chris Kubick, produced under the name of ARCHIVE, release date March 2002
- Conversations with the Countess of Castiglione, audio CD, volume 1 of Art After Death, collaboration with Chris Kubick, produced under the name of ARCHIVE, release date March 2001

== Books ==
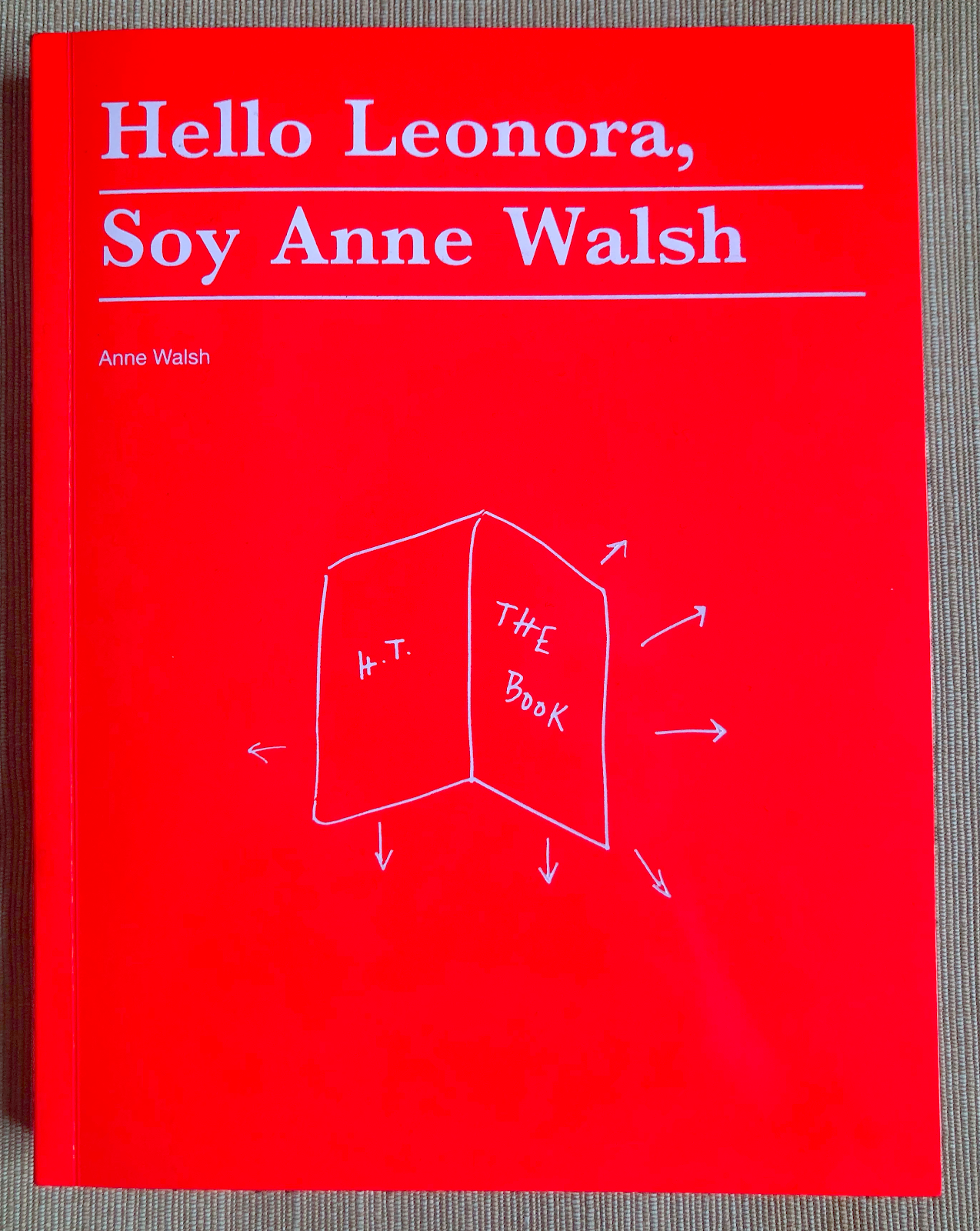
Hello Leonora Soy Anne Walsh book cover

- Hello Leonora Soy Anne Walsh, No Place Press/MIT Press, Spring 2019

== Published texts ==
- “To: Futurefarmers From: JRO.” In Futurefarmers, For Want of a Nail, No Place Press, 2019
- Why Grow? In praise of quiet influence Brooklyn Rail, November 2, 2017
- “Matters of Concern Turning into Matters of Action,” (with Michael Swaine). Combat Paper Press, 2017
- “Instructions #6,” Directions Given - Directions Taken, Southern Exposure Gallery, 2016
- “The Incommensurable City” with Margaret Crawford. No Cruising Mobile Identities and Urban Life in Los Angeles. Global Urban Humanities Research Studio, UCB, 2016
- “Character List,” in The Thing: The Book. A Monument to the Book as Object. Jonn Herschend and Will Rogan, eds. ChronicleBooks, 2014
- “Notes for a Treatment” in Slapstick and the Sublime, Issue 5.5 of Art Practical July 2014
- “The Unfinished: The Recumbent Site” Artbound, March 2014
- MFA Now exhibition catalogue, Root Division Gallery, spring 2012, regular contributor Spring-Summer 2010
- “A Discourse Concerning the Practice of Art. Allan de Souza, Anne Walsh, and Chris Kubick in conversation” Camerawork: A Journal of Photographic Art, Fall 2009
- The THING Quarterly, volume 1, issue 2, Summer 2008
- “Interview with Lawrence Rinder,” X-Tra, Spring 2005
- “Interview with Kevin Appel,” X-Tra, fall 1999 vol 3, no.1
- “Interview with Jim Isermann” X-Tra, fall 1999 vol 3, no.1
- “Houses by Artists,” X-tra, fall 1999 vol 3, no.1
