= Kitchen garden (disambiguation) =

Kitchen garden or kitchen-garden may refer to:

- Kitchen garden, area used for growing edible plants
- Kitchen Garden Association, industrial arts organization in New York City (1880-1884)
- The Kitchen Garden on the Eyot, 1946 painting by Leonora Carrington
- The Victorian Kitchen Garden, 1987 British television series
