= The Giantess (The Guardian of the Egg) =

Painting by Leonora Carrington

- The Guardian of the Egg
- Year: 1947
- Dimensions: 120 cm (47 in) × 69.2 cm (27.2 in)

The Giantess (The Guardian of the Egg) is a painting by Leonora Carrington. The painting is considered one of her most famous works as it sold for almost $1.5 million in 2009. Carrington created The Giantess c. 1947 in Mexico City after becoming a resident of Mexico in 1942. The tempera on wood panel painting is 117 x 68 cm. The Giantess now resides in the private collection of Miguel S. Escobedo in Mexico.

== Description ==
Carrington wrote, "... it’s a sort of a giantess with a moonlike face in a field of wheat which is also golden hair. Her cape is white and she has a russet red dress with panels in which birdlike people are conversing. Out of the cape come wild geese which encircle her. She is standing against a sort of turquoise sea in which are small islands..."

As described by Carrington, the giantess, a huge female figure, stands in the center of the landscape scene with the sea behind her. She has an oval-shaped body. Surrounding her head is a field of like a halo. A small face floats in the middle of the wheat. She wears a red dress beneath a white cape. Through the opening of her cape are depictions of strange bird headed people and a three headed bird in a register of scenes on the front of her dress. Two tiny hands holding a spotted egg emerge from inside of the cape. At her waist, two geese fly out from beneath the cape, while others fly around her. The giantess appears peaceful with her eyes directed towards some of the geese flying beside her.

Between the giantess’s feet are three barely noticeable women. Groups of three women are a recurring motif in much of Carrington's art, such as Three Women Around the Table (1951), and The Magdalens (1986). Some have concluded that this is a representation of her with her circle of surrealist artist friends in Mexico, Remedios Varo and Kati Horna. In Celtic mythology, there are triple deity goddesses and for Carrington, giantess was synonymous with Goddess. These three women and the symbolic geese could be another clue that this is indeed a work portraying a specific goddess.

The egg held by the giantess was another recurring motif in Carrington’s works. In Down Below, a short book by Carrington recalling her memoirs from time spent in a mental institution, she describes the conception of her egg motif. "This morning, the idea of the egg came again to my mind and I thought that I could use it as a crystal to look at Madrid in those days of July and August 1940—for why should it not enclose my own experiences as well as the past and future history of the Universe? The egg is the macrocosm and the microcosm, the dividing line between the Big and the Small which makes it impossible to see the whole." However, the egg already had a history of alchemic symbolism. Several have found similarities in Carrington’s egg and Hieronymus Bosch’s in works such as The Garden of Earthly Delights.

There are considerable likenesses between The Giantess and early colonial representations of Irish people. Much of the painting has a simple folk aesthetic. The attire of the figures and the giantess’s cape with gold surrounded head are similar to that of figures in works such as Albrecht Dürer’s Irish Warrior and Peasants (1521), John Derricke’s Rorie Oge, The Image of Ireland (1581) and John Speed’s Map of Ireland (1610).

== In popular culture ==
The Giantess is among the surrealist paintings by women referenced in Mark Romanek's 1995 video for the Madonna song "Bedtime Story" (1995).
