= Calero =

Calero may refer to:

== People ==
- Adolfo Calero (1931–2012), Nicaraguan businessman, and leader of the Nicaraguan Democratic Force
- Agustín Ramos Calero (1919–1989), Puerto Rican soldier in World War II
- Carlos Calero (born 1972), Colombian television presenter
- Dennis Calero (born 1972), U.S. American illustrator and comic book artist
- Diego Calero (born 1940), Colombian cyclist
- Fernando Calero (born 1995), Spanish football player
- Franco Calero (born 1989), Argentinian football player
- Gloria Calero Sierra (1906–1990), Mexican artist
- Inés María Calero (born 1969), Miss Venezuela titleholder for 1987
- Iván Calero (born 1995), Spanish football player
- Juan José Calero (born 1998), Colombian/Mexican football player
- Juan Sebastián Calero (born 1982), Colombian actor
- Julián Calero (born 1970), Spanish footballer and coach
- Kiko Calero (born 1975), Puerto Rican Major League Baseball relief pitcher
- Marcelo Calero (born 1982), Brazilian politician
- Marcos Calero Pérez (born 1993), Spanish football player
- Marisol Calero (born 1963), Puerto Rican actress and singer
- Miguel Calero (1971–2012), Colombian football goalkeeper
- Nacho Calero (born 1991), Spanish motorcycle racer
- Patricio Calero (born 1977), Ecuadorian boxer
- Ricardo Carballo Calero (1910–1990), Spanish philologist, academic and writer
- Róger Calero (born 1969), Nicaraguan American journalist
- Rudel Calero (born 1982), Nicaraguan football player

== Other ==
- Isla Calero (English: Calero Island), Costa Rican island
- Calero Reservoir, artificial lake in the Santa Teresa Hills, California, formed in 1935
- Lake Calero, artificial lake in Sacramento County, California, formed in 1982

== See also ==
- Jorge "el Calero" Suárez (1945–1997), former Salvadoran footballer
- Estadio Jorge Calero Suárez, multi-purpose stadium in Metapán, El Salvador
