= Portrait of Max Ernst =

1939 painting by Leonora Carrington

- Artist: Leonora Carrington
- Year: c. 1939
- Medium: Oil on canvas
- Dimensions: 50.30 cm × 26.80 cm (19.80 in × 10.55 in)
- Location: Scottish National Gallery of Modern Art, Edinburgh

Portrait of Max Ernst, also known as Bird Superior – Portrait of Max Ernst, is an oil on canvas painting by English artist Leonora Carrington, created c. 1939. The painting was made when the two artists were having a short-lived affair. It is held at the Scottish National Gallery of Modern Art, in Edinburgh, who purchased it in 2018. It was the first work by the artist acquired by the museum.

== History and description ==
Carrington met German Surrealist painter Max Ernst in a dinner in London, in 1937, and they soon become lovers. She moved shortly after to Paris, to stay with Ernst, and had the chance to meet there many leading Surrealist artists. The couple moved to the village of Saint-Martin-d'Ardèche, near Avignon, the following year. It was there that Carrington made the current painting, probably in 1939, shortly before the beginning of World War II. (In 1940 the couple became separated when Ernst was detained by the police and Carrington compelled to escape to Spain). The influence of Ernst can be seen in the painting, with his human and animal symbiosis, something which was also Carrington's own personal stamp.

Ernst appears, white-haired, walking calmly, strangely dressed in a woolly feather-like covered red coat with a merman-like tail, while his only visible foot wears a striped yellow sock. He is depicted in a frozen, desolated landscape, with a sea and snow mountains or icebergs visible in the distance. Ernst carries a kind of lantern, with a small horse inside. Behind him, to his left, stands a frozen horse. The horses have been interpreted as symbols of Carrington herself, who often portrayed them on her paintings, and as such their presence can be interpreted as representing the dependence she felt from Ernst or perhaps her wish to be freed from that.

Sarah Glennie wrote on the painting, in the catalogue of a Carrington exhibition held in 2013: "In her short story The Bird Superior Max Ernst, (...) and dedicated to Ernst, Carrington wrote of the Bird Superior (Ernst) and a horse (Carrington) becoming one in the presence of an alchemical fire and cauldron. Their union was symbolized by Ernst transforming into a bird who unties the horse from the fire so that together they are freed to escape through the war winds which leap out of the pot like smoke, like hair, like wind. Love is here represented by the philosopher’s stone, but the cauldron (symbolizing rebirth), the horse (symbolizing escape) and the bird (symbolizing renewal) tend to all evoke a quintessentially Celtic goddess iconography".

== Provenance ==
Ernst was arrested as a German alien in 1940, but released shortly after. Carrington meanwhile had fled to Spain, where she was committed to a psychiatric hospital, due to her mental state at the time. Ernst was able to visit the home he had shared with Carrington and took several paintings with him, including the current portrait. Ernst sent her the painting before he moved to the United States. The two painters, now separated, met again in New York City in 1942 and she offered him the current Portrait of Max Ernst, while he offered her his Leonora in the Morning Light (1940). They would never meet again. The work was in the collection of Pegeen Guggenheim, Peggy Guggenheim's daughter, and had several other owners, until being finally bought by the National Galleries of Scotland by £560,000 ($738,000), in July 2018 at Sotheby's.
