= Chiki Weisz =

Hungarian photographer (1911–2007)

- Born: Imre Weisz Schwarz; 21 October 1911; Budapest, Austria-Hungary
- Died: 17 January 2007 (aged 95); Mexico City
- Resting place: Panteón Israelita
- Other name: Emerico Weisz
- Spouse: Leonora Carrington
- Children: Gabriel Weisz; Pablo Weisz
- Father: Abraham Armin Weisz

Imre or Emerico Weisz Schwarz (21 October 1911 - 14 January 2007), known as Chiki Weisz, (Note: Also spelled "Chiqui" or "Cziki.") was a Hungarian photographer, assistant to Robert Capa, and married to the surrealist painter Leonora Carrington. He was a Holocaust survivor and escaped from a concentration camp.

== Biography ==
Born in Budapest in 1911 to a Jewish family, Weisz lost his father, Abraham Armin Weisz, in the First World War a few years later. A saddler by profession, he fell from his horse, became infected by manure and left four children fatherless. Imre's mother, without money, chose to send the four-year-old to an orphanage.

In 1931, after leaving the orphanage, he wanted to study engineering, but was rejected because he was Jewish. He and Endre Ernö Friedman, two years younger and also Jewish (who would become the most famous war photographer of the 20th century under the pseudonym Robert Capa), decided to leave Hungary, which was shrouded in anti-Semitic hatred.

On foot and without money, Capa and Chiki arrived in Berlin shortly before Adolf Hitler came to power in 1933. Faced with the persecution of Jews, they went on foot to Paris, where they met the photographer David Seymour, who got them work at the magazine Regards, to cover the mobilisations of the Spanish Popular Front, moving to Spain in 1936, just after the outbreak of the Civil War. Together with Maurice Ochshorn, also a photographer, they were at the main combat fronts.

According to his son, the poet Gabriel Weisz, many of the photos attributed to Capa were the product of the three friends' joint work, but Weisz never claimed authorship out of gratitude to Capa, who helped him flee to Mexico.

In 1940, Chiki Weisz returned to Paris, where he worked for Magnum, the photo agency co-founded by Capa. He lived in the same building as Pablo Picasso.

Faced with the persecution by the Vichy regime of refugees from the Spanish Civil War, and fearing that the negatives of the photographs taken in Spain would be confiscated, Chiki Weisz saved his friend's photographic material by travelling to Marseille by bicycle. There he was able to deliver the negatives of 4,500 photographs by Capa, David "Chim" Seymour and Gerda Taro, to the Mexican General Francisco Javier Aguilar González just before being arrested and sent to a concentration camp in Morocco. For 70 years, the 126 film rolls lay tightly rolled up in three small cardboard boxes. When Aguilar's daughter sold his house in 1995, the three boxes that Weisz had packed in 1940 were rediscovered. This story is recounted in the documentary The Mexican Suitcase (2012), directed by Trisha Ziff.

After several months in the concentration camp, he managed to escape and hid in Marseille. There he met refugees belonging to the surrealist movement, such as the poet Benjamin Péret and the painter Remedios Varo, with whom he would make the journey to Mexico.

Capa obtained permission through former president Lázaro Cárdenas del Río for Chiki to travel to Mexico and gave him money. He boarded the Serpa Pinto, arriving in Veracruz on 1 October 1942. "He arrived without luggage. He only brought with him a toothbrush, a coat, and a false document stating that he was not Hungarian, because Mexico had no relations with that country", according to his son Pablo.

With the support of a Jewish organisation, he was able to begin working for the firm belonging to Senya Fleshin and Mollie Steimer, Russian Jews united under the acronym Semo, photographing Mexican film artists, muralists, writers, and politicians.

In 1944, at a meeting at the home of José and Kati Horna, Chiki met Leonora Carrington, who lived with Remedios Varo and Benjamin Péret on Calle Gabino Barreda.

The group of refugees, who met in the Colonia Roma district together with the surrealists, were joined by Spanish republicans such as Gerardo Lizarraga, painters such as Gunther Gerzso, photographers such as Maurice Ochshorn, and Kati Horna herself, whom Chiki had known from Hungary.

In Mexico, Chiki married Leonora Carrington, became a press photographer, had two children and decided never to leave again, Mexico being his true refuge. He worked for the magazine ¡Hola!, at the Núcleo Radio Mil, at XEW, the Herdez company and with Emilio Azcárraga Vidaurreta. He set up his darkroom in his own house on Chihuahua Street and there he quietly stored away his memories, which included photographs with Cantinflas and María Félix.

In his eighties, his eyesight deteriorated and he lost his job. He spent his last years in silence, in front of the television; he did not even speak to Leonora. He died from a serious renal illness and was buried in the Panteón Israelita, surrounded only by a few friends, Leonora Carrington and his children.
