= MacKinley Helm =

American writer and collector

MacKinley Helm (1896–1963) was an American writer and collector.

Among his friends during this period were Ines Amor, Alfred Barr, Henry Klifford, Federico Cantú, and William Spratling, which placed MacKinley Helm in a good position to write about these artists, and his book is now considered the best introduction to the art and artists of Mexico during the artistic movements of the twenties and thirties.

Helm married Frances Lathrop Hammond (1894–1973).

== Books ==
- 1936: After Pentecost: a history of Christian ideas and institutions from Peter and Paul to Ignatius of Antioch. New York: Harper
- 1941: Modern Mexican Painters. New York: Harper
- 1942: Angel Mo' and her son, Roland Hayes. Boston: Little, Brown
- 1946: A Matter of Love, and other baroque tales of the provinces. New York: Harper
- 1948: John Marin. Boston: Pellegrini & Cudahy (reissued: New York: Kennedy; Da Capo Press, 1970)
- 1948: Journeying through Mexico. Boston: Little, Brown
- 1949: A Month of Sundays, and other baroque tales of the provinces. London: Harvill Press
- 1953: Spring in Spain. London: Gollancz
- 1953: Man of Fire; J. C. Orozco: an interpretative memoir. Boston: Institute of Contemporary Art
- 1956: Fray Junipero Serra: the great walker. Stanford, Calif.: Stanford University Press (play)
- 1943: Story of Pipila
