= How Doth the Little Crocodile (Carrington) =

Painting and sculpture by Leonora Carrington in Mexico City

- Cómo hace el pequeño cocodrilo (Spanish)
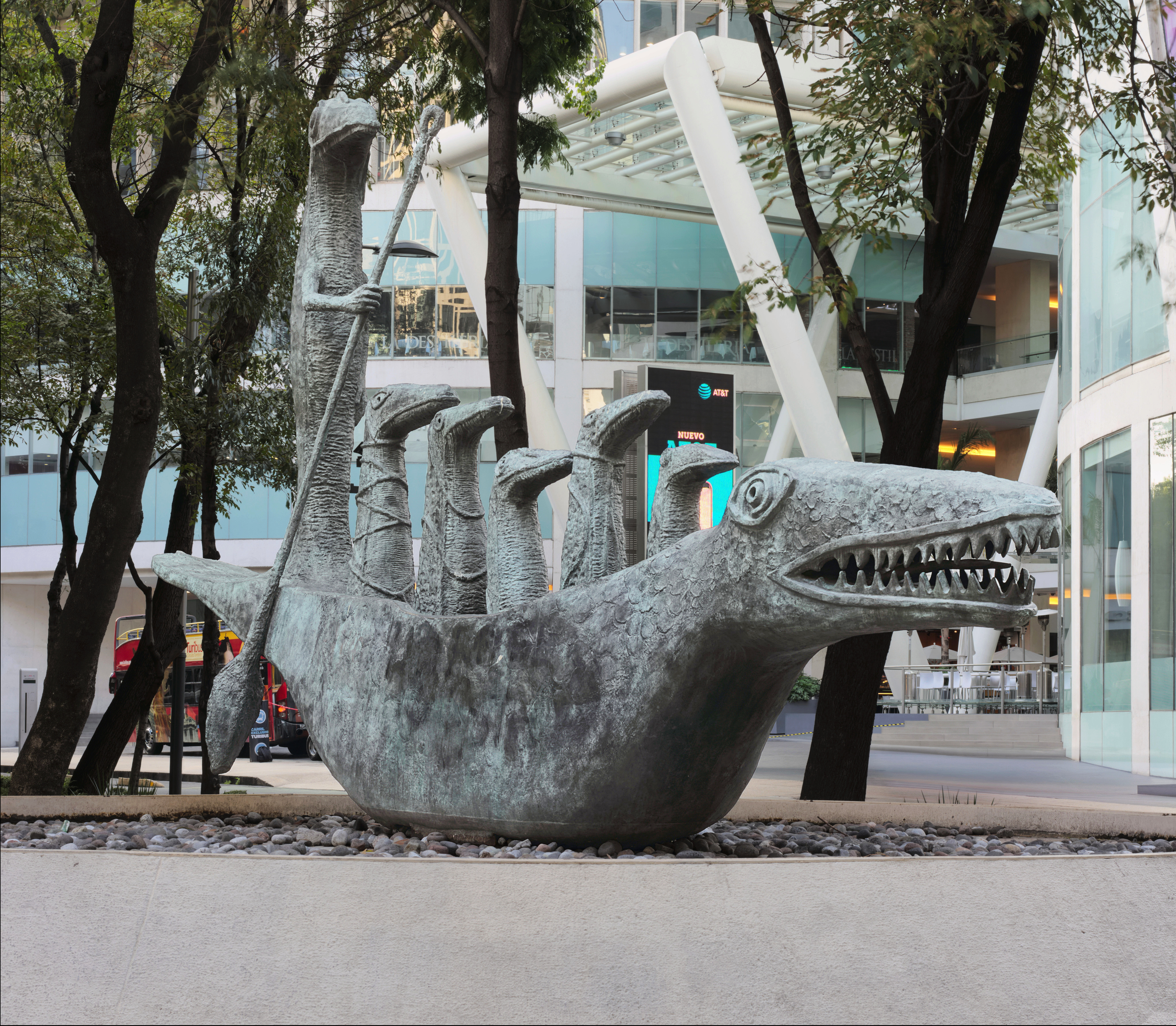
- The sculpture in 2017
- Artist: Leonora Carrington
- Year: c. 1998
- Medium: Bronze
- Subject: "How Doth the Little Crocodile"
- Dimensions: 4.8 m × 8.5 m (16 ft × 28 ft)
- Weight: 5 tonnes (4.9 long tons; 5.5 short tons)
- Location: Mexico City, Mexico; 19.42930°N 99.16227°W

How Doth the Little Crocodile (Spanish: Cómo hace el pequeño cocodrilo) (Note: Otherwise known as Cocodrilo and La barca del cocodrilo (lit. transl. The Crocodile Boat).) is both a painting and an outdoor bronze sculpture by British-born Mexican artist Leonora Carrington.

Carrington first painted How Doth the Little Crocodile in 1998. The statue was cast around that time and in 2000, it was donated to the government of Mexico City, who installed it in a pond at Chapultepec Park, in the Miguel Hidalgo borough. The sculpture was relocated in 2006 to Paseo de la Reforma Avenue, in the Cuauhtémoc borough, in downtown Mexico City.

Both artworks were inspired by and named after the 1865 poem "How Doth the Little Crocodile", written by Lewis Carroll for his novel Alice's Adventures in Wonderland.

== History ==
=== Background and description ===
How Doth the Little Crocodile by Carrington (1998)

Leonora Carrington (1917–2011) was a British artist who established in Mexico during the World War II era. She mainly worked as a painter and it was not until 1994 that she started to sculpt, after the insistence of Isaac Masri, a Mexican art promoter. In one year, she had sculpted eight works. Carrington and Masri included them in the exhibition "Freedom in Bronze 2000".

In 1998, Carrington painted How Doth the Little Crocodile (Spanish: Cómo hace el pequeño cocodrilo), which features five small crocodiles sailing on a large crocodile boat that is being propelled with a paddle by another crocodile. How Doth the Little Crocodile was based on and named after "How Doth the Little Crocodile", an 1865 poem written by Lewis Carroll for his novel Alice's Adventures in Wonderland.

Carrington presented Masri with a representation of How Doth the Little Crocodile, which Masri recalled was "done completely in paper wrapped in cloth", and he added:

Curiously [...] after we finished 'Freedom in Bronze' and the exhibition was still on, Leonora called me and invited me for a drink [... At her home], she opened the door to a room I had never been in and I was facing the piece called Crocodile [...] I became very excited because I had not expected it. The first thing that came into my mind was, 'This has to be in water.' Leonora said, 'Take it to the foundry,' which is exactly what I did and she was delighted with the result.

The bronze sculpture of How Doth the Little Crocodile is 8.5 metres (28 ft) long and 4.8 metres (16 ft) high, and weighs 5 tonnes (4.9 long tons; 5.5 short tons).

=== Installation and relocation ===
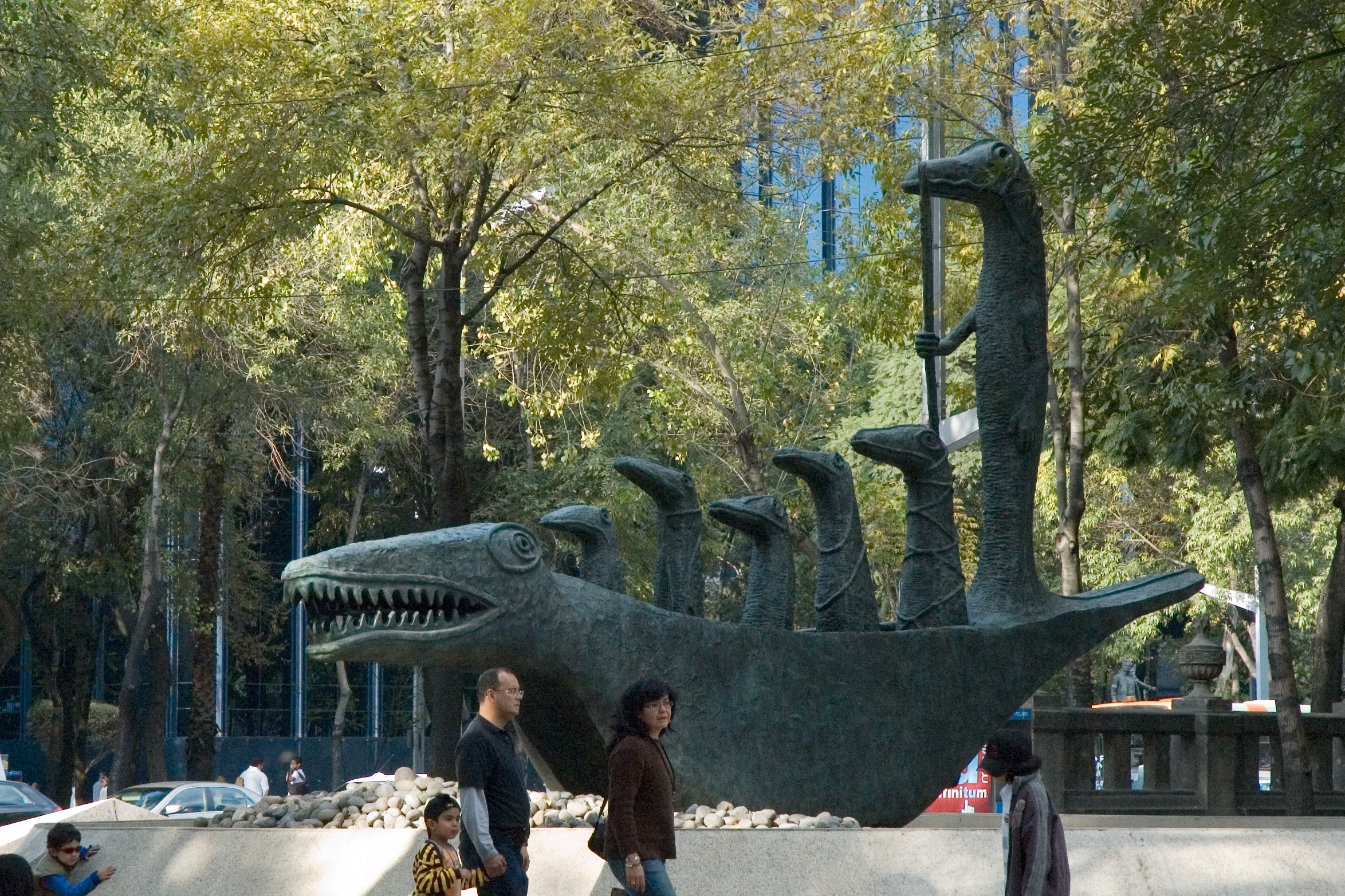
The sculpture on Paseo de la Reforma, 2008

After the sculpture was cast, she donated it to the government of Mexico City. Masri insisted it had to stand on the water as the work depicts aquatic animals in an aquatic setup. Cuauhtémoc Cárdenas, then-head of government, decided to pay homage to Carrington and her contributions to the city, who accepted it as long as it was a small event. The selected space was in the middle of a pond at the second section of Chapultepec Park, formerly occupied by a fountain whose systems were never plugged. The government remodelled the area, erased the graffiti in the zone and it was illuminated. How Doth the Little Crocodile was placed in March 2000 in a ceremony where Carrington was recognised as "Woman of Distinction" by the city.

According to Masri, one day Carrington visited Crocodile and noticed that several parked trucks were obstructing the view. Carrington herself proposed a relocation site as the sculpture could be more in touch with the public. In March 2006, the sculpture was relocated to a fountain in the corner of Havre Street and Paseo de la Reforma Avenue, next to Reforma 222.

== Impact ==
The painting was featured as a Google Doodle on 6 April 2015.
