= The Kitchen Garden on the Eyot =

1946 painting by Leonora Carrington

The Kitchen Garden on the Eyot is a tempera on wood panel painting by English artist Leonora Carrington, created in 1946. It is held at the San Francisco Museum of Modern Art.

== Description ==
Carrington had settled in Mexico City when she created the current painting. She was also pregnant with her son and would give birth shortly after finishing it. The title of the canvas mentions the kitchen garden seen at the center of the composition, where several fruit trees and vegetables are grown. The painting reflects her influences from surrealism, but also from esoteric spirituality, such as the Kabbala and alchemy, and Celtic mythology. Solomon Adler believes that the three feminine figures at the left can be interpreted as references to Carrington herself and friends who shared some of her interests, like Spanish painter Remedios Varo and Hungarian photographer Kati Horna. Adler describes the painting, similarly to others from the artist, as an "etheral vision", where "On the right, a white phantom springs from the trunk of a tree; on the left, a horned figure in red robes resembling the Celtic god Cernunnos consorts with fellow spirits." Several chickens and a rooster can be seen at the right, while other animals also appear in the composition. Adler notices that "A glowing bird lays eggs in midair next to the three figures on the left, while the white figure in the tree holds a gigantic specimen. The egg’s shape echoes in the rotund figures of hens, the oval gate that encircles the tree, the tree’s rounded branches, and the vessel held by the orange figure." The eggs function as a symbol of birth and creation, starting by the medium of tempera used by Carrington.
