= How Doth the Little Crocodile =

Poem by Lewis Carroll

"How Doth the Little Crocodile" is a poem by Lewis Carroll that appears in chapter 2 of his 1865 novel Alice's Adventures in Wonderland. Alice recites it while attempting to recall "Against Idleness and Mischief" by Isaac Watts. It describes a crafty crocodile that lures fish into its mouth with a welcoming smile.

This poem is performed by Richard Haydn, the voice of the caterpillar in Alice in Wonderland (1951) and by Fiona Fullerton in the film Alice's Adventures in Wonderland (1972).

In 1998, surrealist artist Leonora Carrington made a painting and a sculpture of the same title, based on this poem.

== Text ==
How doth the little crocodile
Improve his shining tail
And pour the waters of the Nile
On every golden scale!

How cheerfully he seems to grin,
How neatly spreads his claws,
And welcomes little fishes in
With gently smiling jaws!

== "Against Idleness and Mischief" ==
"How Doth the Little Crocodile" is a parody of the moralistic 1715 poem "Against Idleness and Mischief" by Isaac Watts, which is what Alice was originally trying to recite. Watts' poem begins "How doth the little busy bee ..." and uses the bee as a model of hard work. In Carroll's parody, the crocodile's corresponding "virtues" are deception and predation, themes that recur throughout Alice's adventures in both books, and especially in the poems.
