= Self-Portrait (Inn of the Dawn Horse) =

Painting by Leonora Carrington

- Artist: Leonora Carrington
- Year: 1937–1938
- Medium: Oil on canvas
- Dimensions: 65 cm × 81.2 cm (25.5 in × 32 in)
- Location: Metropolitan Museum of Art, New York

Self-Portrait (Inn of the Dawn Horse) is a painting executed by English artist Leonora Carrington and is currently in the collection of the Metropolitan Museum of Art. She began the painting in London in 1937 and completed it in Paris in 1938. It is one of her most recognized works and has been called her "first truly Surrealist work". The presence of horses and hyenas soon became a common feature in her work.

== Description ==
Self-Portrait features an interior space consisting of two walls meeting at a corner, a ceiling, a tiled floor, and an ornately curtained window that reveals a lush, green forest view and a white horse galloping in the distance. Carrington depicted herself seated on a chair in the foreground, gesturing to a lactating hyena on her right. Her wild tresses appear to mimic a horse's mane and the hyena's fur color. Above her head is a floating white rocking horse. The white of her breeches mirrors the white color of both the rocking horse and the horse seen in the distance, and her green jacket reflects the forest exterior. She gazes out to the viewer directly and sternly.

== Symbolism and interpretations ==
=== Horses ===
Horses, in Carrington's work, appeared frequently and as early as 1929; they represented an aspect of her animal self as symbols of freedom and liberty. Because of Carrington's interest in Celtic mythology, she would have been familiar with the Celtic goddess Epona, who appeared before her followers on a white horse. The white rocking horse floating above Carrington is most likely a reference to Pénélope, a play Carrington wrote about a young girl who is in love with her rocking horse Tartarus (or Tartar as he is known in the French version)

=== Hyena ===
The inclusion of the hyena may suggest an "intrusion of the wild into a domestic space," which Carrington is ultimately aligning herself with as noted by her gesture towards the female hyena and their mirrored stares towards the viewer. Carrington often identified with the hyena, in the same way she identified with horses, saying in an interview from 1999, "I'm like a hyena, I get into the garbage cans. I have an insatiable curiosity."

== Provenance ==
At the beginning of World War II, Carrington left the painting with German artist Max Ernst, who took it to New York in 1941. He gave it to art dealer Pierre Matisse, the youngest son of French painter Henri Matisse, sometime after December 1942, and upon his death, the painting was transferred to his widow Maria-Gaetana Matisse. In 2002, Self-Portrait was given to the Metropolitan Museum of Art by the Pierre and Maria-Gaetana Matisse Foundation.

== Exhibition history ==
- New York. Museum of Modern Art. "Twentieth Century Portraits," 9 December 1942 – 24 January 1943, unnumbered cat. (p. 122; lent by Marx Ernst, New York).
- Baltimore Museum of Art. "Twentieth Century Portraits," February 12–7 March 1943, unnumbered cat.
- Worcester, MA. Worcester Art Museum. "Twentieth Century Portraits," March 21–18 April 1941, unnumbered cat.
- Arts Club of Chicago. "Twentieth Century Portraits," May 4–31, 1943, unnumbered cat.
- San Francisco. California Palace of the Legion of Honor. "Twentieth Century Portraits," June 14–12 July 1943, unnumbered cat.
- City Art Museum of Saint Louis. "Twentieth Century Portraits," October 1–29, 1943, unnumbered cat.
- Flint, MI. Flint Institute of Arts. "Twentieth Century Portraits," November 20–18 December 1943, unnumbered cat.
- Utica, NY. Munson-Williams-Proctor Arts Institute. "Twentieth Century Portraits," January 1–29, 1944, unnumbered cat.
- West Palm Beach, FL. Norton Gallery and School of Art. "Twentieth Century Portraits," February 11–10 March 1944, unnumbered cat.
- Winter Park, FL. Rollins College. "Twentieth Century Portraits," March 18–8 April 1944, unnumbered cat.
- New York. Center for Inter-American Relations. "Leonora Carrington: A Retrospective Exhibition," 26 November 1975 – 4 January 1976, no. 1.
- University Art Museum, University of Texas at Austin. "Leonora Carrington: A Retrospective Exhibition," January 18–29 February 1976, no. 1.
- London. Hayward Gallery. "Dada and Surrealism Reviewed," January 11–27 March 1978, no. 12.30.
- Milan. Palazzo Reale. "L'altra metà dell'Avanguardia, 1910–1940: Pittrici e scultrici nei movimenti delle avanguardie storiche," February 14–18 May 1980, unnumbered cat. (p. 274).
- Rome. Palazzo delle Esposizioni. "L'altra metà dell'Avanguardia, 1910–1940: Pittrici e scultrici nei movimenti delle avanguardie storiche," July 3–8 August 1980, unnumbered cat.
- Kulturhuset, Stockholm. "Andra Hälften av Avantgardet 1910–1940," February 14–3 May 1981, unnum. brochure.
- New York. Jeffrey Hoffeld and Company. "Women Surrealists: A Selection of Works from 1930 to 1950," April 30–8 June 1985, unnumbered cat.
- Women's Caucus for Art, New York City Chapter, Great Hall Gallery, Cooper Union School of Art. "Six Women of Distinction: WCA Honor Awards 1986," February 12–3 March 1986, not in catalogue.
- New York. Baruch College Gallery. "Women Artists of the Surrealist Movement, 1924–1947," October 3–7 November 1986, unnum. brochure.
- Stonybrook. SUNY Fine Arts Center Gallery. "Women Artists of the Surrealist Movement, 1924–1947," 18 November 1986 – 10 January 1987, unnum. brochure.
- Musée cantonal des Beaux-Arts de Lausanne. "La femme et le Surréalisme," 21 November 1987 – 28 February 1988, no. 11.
- New York. National Academy of Design. "La Mujer en Mexico/Women in Mexico," September 27–2 December 1990, no. 43.
- Mexico City. Centro Cultural Arte Contemporáneo. "La Mujer en Mexico/Women in Mexico," Winter 1991, no. 43.
- Museo de Monterrey. "La Mujer en Mexico/Women in Mexico," Spring 1991, no. 43.
- London. Serpentine Gallery. "Leonora Carrington: Paintings, Drawings and Sculptures, 1940–1990," 11 December 1991 – 22 January 1992, no. 1.
- Preston, U. K. Harris Museum. "Leonora Carrington: Paintings, Drawings and Sculptures, 1940–1990," closed 31 March 1992, no. 1.
- Bristol. Arnolfini. "Leonora Carrington: Paintings, Drawings and Sculptures, 1940–1990," April 11–10 May 1992, no. 1.
- Tokyo. Nippon Gallery. "Reonõra Kyarinton ten/Leonora Carrington," June 3–16, 1993, unnumbered cat.
- Tokyo Station Gallery. "Leonora Carrington," October 14–12 November 1997, no. 1.
- Umeda–Osaka. Daimaru Museum. "Leonora Carrington," February 11–23, 1998, no. 1.
- Hida Takayama Museum of Art. "Leonora Carrington," February 28–29 March 1998, no. 1.
- Tsu. Mie Prefectural Art Museum. "Leonora Carrington," April 4–5 May 1998, no. 1.
- Cambridge. Massachusetts Institute of Technology, List Visual Arts Center. "Mirror Images: Women, Surrealism and Self–Representation," April 9–28 June 1998, unnumbered cat. (pl.3).
- Miami Art Museum. "Mirror Images: Women, Surrealism and Self–Representation," September 18–29 November 1998, unnumbered cat.
- San Francisco Museum of Modern Art. "Mirror Images: Women, Surrealism and Self–Representation," January 8–20 April 1999, unnumbered cat.
- Paris. Mona Bismarck Foundation. "Peinture moderne au Mexique: Collection Jacques et Natasha Gelman," March 10–8 May 1999, no. 136.
- Fundacion Proa, Buenos Aires. "Arte Mexicano: Coleccion Jacques y Natasha Gelman," May 27–1 August 1999, no. 34.
- Canberra. National Gallery of Australia. "Frida Kahlo, Diego Rivera, and Mexican Modernism: The Jacques and Natasha Gelman Collection," July 13–28 October 2001, unnumbered cat. (p. 34).
- New York. The Metropolitan Museum of Art. "Surrealism: Desire Unbound," February 6–12 May 2002, not in catalogue.
- New York. The Metropolitan Museum of Art. "Selections from The Pierre and Maria-Gaetana Matisse Collection, Part 2," 28 September 2004 – 30 January 2005, no catalogue.
- Paris. Mona Bismarck Foundation. "Pierre Matisse, passeur passionné: Un marchand d'art et ses artistes," 20 October 2005 – 14 January 2006, unnumbered cat. (p. 96).
- Museo Picasso Málaga. "La Colección Pierre y Maria-Gaetana Matisse en The Metropolitan Museum of Art, Nueva York," March 26–24 June 2007, no. 3.
- Manchester Art Gallery. "Angels of Anarchy: Women Artists and Surrealism," 26 September 2009 – 10 January 2010, no. 30.
- Los Angeles County Museum of Art. "In Wonderland: The Surrealist Adventures of Women Artists in Mexico and the United States," January 29–6 May 2012, unnumbered cat. (fig. 78; as "Inn of the Dawn Horse [Self-Portrait]").
- Musée National des Beaux-Arts du Québec. "In Wonderland: The Surrealist Adventures of Women Artists in Mexico and the United States," June 7–3 September 2012, unnumbered cat.

== Bibliography ==
- Aberth, Susan L. Leonora Carrington: Surrealism, Alchemy and Art. Aldershot, Hampshire: Lund Humphries, 2004.
- Colvile, Georgiana M. M. "Beauty and/Is the Beast: Animal Symbology in the Work of Leonora Carrington, Remedios Varo and Leonor Fini." In Surrealism and Women, edited by Mary Ann Cars, Rudolf E. Kuenzli, and Gwen Raaberg, 159-181. Cambridge: The MIT Press, 1991.
- The Metropolitan Museum of Art. "The Pierre and Maria-Gaetana Matisse Foundation." Accessed 16 March 2019. https://www.metmuseum.org/exhibitions/listings/2004/pierre-and-maria-gaetana-matisse-collection.
- The Metropolitan Museum of Art. "Self-Portrait." Accessed 16 March 2019. https://www.metmuseum.org/art/collection/search/492697
