= Bernard Lewin =

American art collector

Bernard Lewin (September 30, 1906 - January 30, 2003) was a German-born American citizen who amassed the largest private collection of modern Mexican art in the world. Prior to his death in 2003, Lewin and his wife Edith donated more than 2,000 works of art worth over $25 million to the Los Angeles County Museum of Art (abbreviated lacma).

== Latin American art collection ==
Lewin was a personal friend of Federico Cantu, Rufino Tamayo, and David Alfaro Siqueiros. Lewin's collection included the only portrait of Frida Kahlo by Diego Rivera that was not part of mural. Other works donated to the Los Angeles County Museum included Carlos Mérida, José Clemente Orozco, Rafael Coronel, and Francisco Zúñiga.
