= Luis Cardoza y Aragón =

Guatemalan writer, essayist, poet, art critic and diplomat

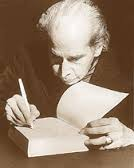
Luis Cardoza y Aragón

Luis Cardoza y Aragón (June 21, 1904 - September 4, 1992) was a Guatemalan writer, essayist, poet, art critic, and diplomat. Born in Antigua Guatemala, he spent part of his life living in exile in Mexico.

Cardoza attended primary school in Antigua Guatemala and at the Colegio Centroamericano in Guatemala City. His received a secondary education in the city's Instituto Nacional Central para Varones. In the 1920s, Cardoza moved to Paris, France where he became friends with André Breton. Influenced by the avant-garde members of the surrealist movement, his first work titled "Luna Park" was published in 1923 and dedicated to the Guatemalan writer Enrique Gómez Carrillo (1873–1927). He also got to know fellow Guatemalan writer Miguel Ángel Asturias who came to Paris to study at the Sorbonne. Decades later in 1991 Cardoza wrote a book entitled Miguel Ángel Asturias, Casi Novela (Ediciones Era) about their time in Paris during the 1920s and 1930s that earned him the 1992 Mazatlan Literature award in Mexico.

== Exile and diplomatic career ==
Luis Cardoza was appointed Consul General of Guatemala in New York City under the Guatemalan government of Lázaro Chacón but in the early 1930s left the job and his country because of the dictatorial rule of new President Jorge Ubico. He chose to live in self-imposed exile in Mexico City where he became a member of the Liga de Escritores y Artistas Revolucionarios (LEAR), an artistic and intellectual group including Renato Leduc, Federico Cantú Garza, Luis Ortiz Monasterio, Alfonso Reyes, Jose Moreno Villa and others, that at the time had considerable influence on the artistic, cultural and political life of Mexico. In 1936 Cardoza welcomed to Mexico the French artist Antonin Artaud who had been an early influence as part of the Surrealist movement in Paris.

Following the 1944 overthrow of the military dictatorship of General Jorge Ubico in Guatemala, Luis Cardoza was elected to the Asamblea Constituyente (Constituent Assembly). In 1945, the new leftist government made him Guatemala's envoy to Sweden, Norway, and the Soviet Union and two years later in 1947 he was appointed Ambassador to Colombia and later Ambassador to Chile and then France. Political turmoil and the ensuing Guatemalan Civil War saw Cardoza flee his country again and return to live in Mexico where he made a living working for the newspaper, El Nacional. While there, he became associated with painters such as David Alfaro Siqueiros and Diego Rivera as well as with members of the writers group, "Contemporáneos".

In 1974 he was called "one of the most interesting unknowns in Latin America [...] whose work somehow never attracted much attention, by rights he should have ranked with Carlos Pellicer or Xavier Villaurrutia. Perhaps because he was Guatemalan he never seemed to receive critical notice."

Before his death in Mexico City in 1992, Luis Cardoza received wide acclaim for his writings, especially for those on art.

== Assorted works ==
- Luna Park (1923)
- Maelstrom (1926)
- La torre de Babel (1930)
- Catálogo de pinturas (1934)
- El sonámbulo (1937)
- Mexican Art Today (Philadelphia Museum of Art, 1943)
- Pequeña sinfonía del Nuevo Mundo (1949)
- Pintura mexicana contemporánea (1953)
- Guatemala, Las líneas de su mano (1955)
- Quinta estación (1974), containing all of his poems up to that point; published without dates, notes or bibliography
- Miguel Ángel Asturias, Casi Novela (Miguel Ángel Asturias, Almost a Novel) (1991)

For a full list of works, see also:

- Bibliografía de Luis Cardoza y Aragón - Roberto Fuertes Manjón, Midwestern State University

== Honors ==
- 1970 : honorary degree from the Faculty of Humanities, University of San Carlos in Guatemala.
- 1978 : "Quetzal de Jade" award from the Association of Journalists of Guatemala
- 1978 : "Order of Diego de Porres" from the Consejo Nacional para la protección de Antigua Guatemala
- 1979 : "Condecoración del Aguila Azteca" - Mexico's highest award given to foreigners
- 1992 : Mazatlan Literature Award for his book Miguel Ángel Asturias, Casi Novela

== Memorials ==
- The Galería Luis Cardoza y Aragón is an art exposition area at the Centro Cultural Bella Época in Condesa, Mexico named in his honor.
- Mexico awards the Luis Cardoza y Aragón National Prize of Art Critique
- The Luis Cardoza y Aragón Popular Culture Center in Quetzaltenango provides classes in art, music, and English to local children of Quetzaltenango who come from disadvantaged families.
- The Luis Cardoza y Aragón Auditorium at the Mexican Embassy in Guatemala is named in his honor.
