= Les Distractions de Dagobert =

1945 painting by Leonora Carrington

Les Distractions de Dagobert is an oil on canvas painting by the British surrealist artist Leonora Carrington, from 1945. In May 2024, it sold for US$28.5 million (£22.5 million), a record for a U.K.-born female artist.

It sold at auction at Sotheby's in New York City for £22.5 million to Argentinian billionaire Eduardo Costantini, the founder of MALBA, the Museum of Latin American Art of Buenos Aires. Sotheby's describes the work as "whimsical", and Costantini remarked that the work was "one of the most admired works in the history of surrealism and an unparalleled masterpiece of Latin American art."
