= Renato Leduc =

Mexican poet and journalist (1897–1986)

- Born: 16 November 1897; Mexico City, Mexico
- Died: 2 August 1986 (aged 88); Tlalpan, Mexico City, Mexico
- Occupations: Writer; journalist
- Spouse: Leonora Carrington
- Partner: María Félix
- Children: 2
- Writing career
- Notable awards: Premio Nacional de Periodismo (special prize), 1978; Premio Nacional de Periodismo, 1983

Renato Leduc (16 November 1897 – 2 August 1986) was a Mexican poet and journalist.

== Biography ==
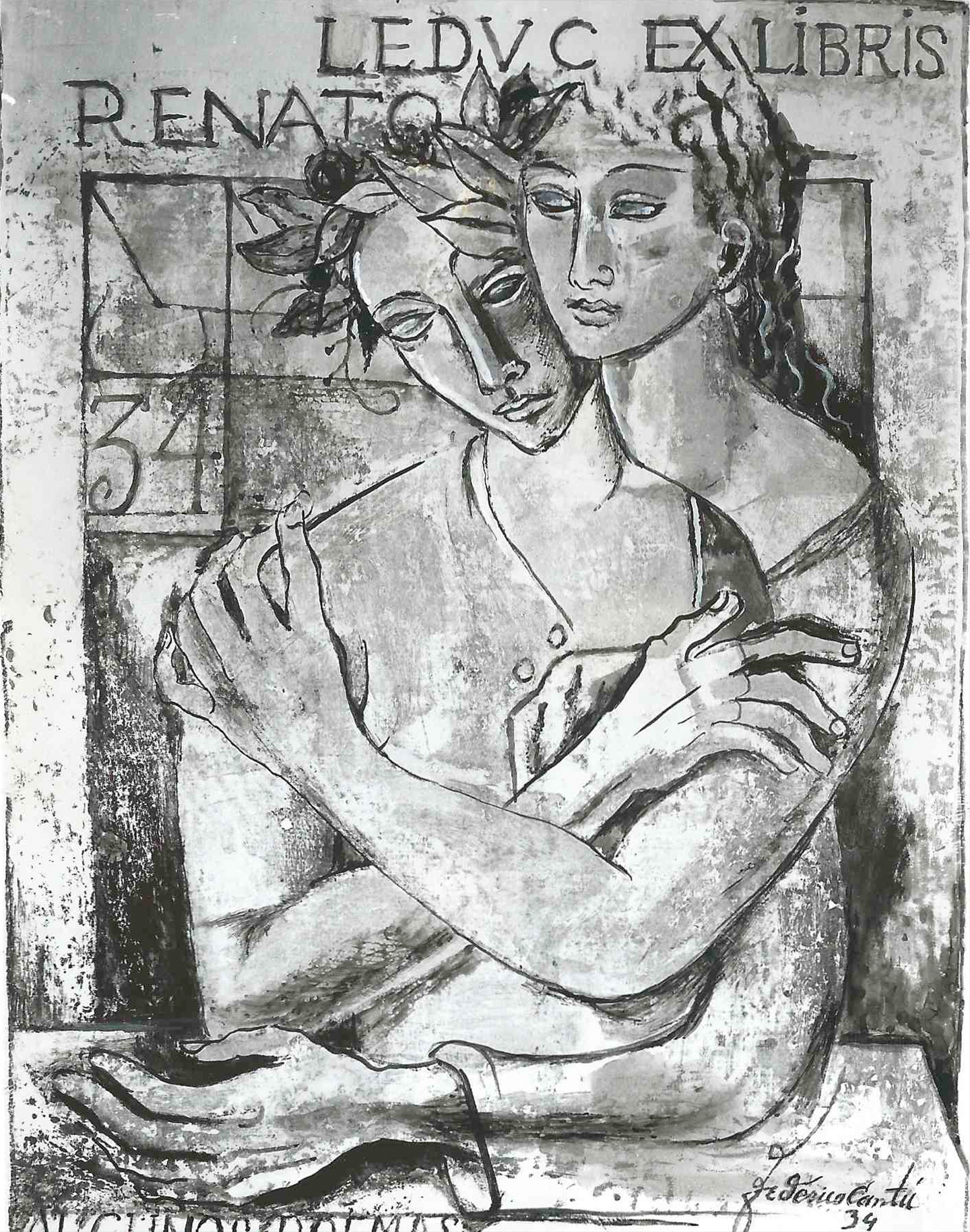
Illustration from Poemas en Paris por Federico Cantú

Leduc served as a signalist in Pancho Villa's División del Norte, and studied law at the National Autonomous University of Mexico. He wrote poetry, stories and chronicles for several newspapers and cultural magazines, before he travelled to Paris by order of the Secretaría de Hacienda y Crédito Público in the mid 1930s, where he met several surrealistic writers, and lived for ten years, during World War II. For a short time, he was married to the British artist and writer Leonora Carrington, whom he met in the embassy in Lisbon, on her flight from the Nazis, after they had arrested Max Ernst in France.

Leduc was a good friend of Elena Poniatowska, Federico Cantú Garza, Luis Cardoza y Aragón, Octavio Paz, Agustín Lara and Fernando Leal, to whom he dedicated his sonnet Mixcalco (1925).

María Félix was Leduc's partner.

Leduc's daughter, Patricia Leduc, is the sole heir of her father's rights and archive.

== Selected works ==
- El aula, 1929
- Unos cuantos sonetos, 1932
- Algunos poemas deliberadamente románticos, 1933
- Breve glosa al Libro de Buen Amor, 1939
- Versos y poemas, 1940
- Desde París, 1942
- Fabulillas de animales, niños y espantos, 1957
- Catorce poemas burocráticos y un corrido reaccionario, 1963
- Prometeo, la Odisea, Euclidiana, 1968
