= The Hearing Trumpet =

1974 novel by Leonora Carrington

- Author: Leonora Carrington
- Language: English
- Genre: Surrealism
- Publication date: 1974
- Publication place: Mexico
- Pages: 224 pages
- ISBN: 978-1878972194

The Hearing Trumpet is a 1974 surrealist novel by Mexican-British author Leonora Carrington. It follows the hard-of-hearing nonagenarian Marian, who is sent off to a peculiar old-age home by her family.

== Plot ==
92-year-old Marian Leatherby lives in Mexico with her son Galahad, his wife Muriel, and her grandson Robert. Upon being gifted a hearing trumpet by her friend Carmella, Marian discovers that her family is planning to put her in an institution. At the institution Marian finds herself drawn into surreal and occult intrigue, conspiracy and adventure.

The last sentence in the novel:

“If the old woman can't go to Lapland, then Lapland must come to the Old Woman.”

== Publication ==
According to the introduction to the 2005 version by Ali Smith, the novel was first published in French translation in 1974, as Le Cornet Acoustique, and first published in the original English version in 1976. According to American art historian Susan L. Aberth The Hearing Trumpet was completed in 1950.

The novel was reprinted by New York Review Books in 2021.

== Reception ==
=== Critical reception ===
Gabriele Annan's 1977 review for The Times Literary Supplement said that "the writing is as neat, dry and witty as the content is wild, woolly and portentous." In his review for The New York Times American novelist Blake Butler referred to the novel as "[...] as something at last truly radical, undoing not only our expectations of time and space, but of the psyche and its boundaries". Ali Smith called the book "One of the most original, joyful, satisfying and quietly visionary novels of the twentieth century." Spanish filmmaker Luis Buñuel wrote: "Reading The Hearing Trumpet liberates us from the miserable reality of our days."

=== Academic analysis ===
Carrington had a relationship with German artist Max Ernst. Renée Riese Hubert has pointed out some influences Ernst may have had on The Hearing Trumpet, though she argues that the defining influences on the novel were "[...] certain traditions in British literature [...Carrington's] familiarity with Mexican culture and myths, and [...Carrington's] enthusiasm for Eskimo and Asian cultures [...]".

Ali Smith regards the book as "a statement on maturity, and the meanings of maturity" and states: "Fundamentally, The Hearing Trumpet is a book about profound disconnection; at its centre are people unable to hear each other, or unwilling to."
