= Leonora Carrington =

British and Mexican artist, surrealist painter and novelist (1917–2011)

Leonora Carrington OBE
- Born: 6 April 1917; Clayton-le-Woods, Chorley, Lancashire, England
- Died: 25 May 2011 (aged 94); Mexico City, Mexico
- Citizenship: United Kingdom; Mexico (from 1942)
- Known for: Painting; Writing
- Movement: Surrealism
- Spouse(s): Renato Leduc; Emerico "Chiki" Weisz
- Children: Gabriel and Pablo Weisz
- Website: leocarrington.com

Mary Leonora Carrington (6 April 1917 – 25 May 2011) was a British and Mexican surrealist painter and novelist. She lived most of her adult life in Mexico City and was one of the last surviving participants in the Surrealist movement of the 1930s. Carrington was also a founding member of the women's liberation movement in Mexico during the 1970s.

== Early life ==
Carrington was born on 6 April 1917 at Westwood House in Clayton-le-Woods, Chorley, Lancashire, England, into a Roman Catholic family. Her father, Harold Wylde Carrington, was a wealthy textile manufacturer, and her mother, Marie (née Moorhead), was from Ireland. She had three brothers: Patrick, Gerald, and Arthur. From 1920 until 1927 she lived at Crookhey Hall, a Gothic Revival mansion in Cockerham, which exerted a great influence on her imagination.

Educated by governesses, tutors, and nuns, she was expelled from two schools, including New Hall School in Chelmsford for her rebellious behaviour, until her family sent her to Florence, where she attended Mrs Penrose's Academy of Art. She also, briefly, attended St Mary's convent school in Ascot. In 1927, at the age of ten, she saw her first Surrealist painting in a Left Bank gallery in Paris and later met many Surrealists, including Paul Éluard. Her father opposed her career as an artist, but her mother encouraged her. She returned to England and was presented at Court, but, according to her, because she had no intention of being "sold to the highest bidder" she brought a copy of Aldous Huxley's Eyeless in Gaza (1936) to read instead. In 1935, she attended the Chelsea School of Art in London for one year, and with the help of her father's friend Serge Chermayeff, she was able to transfer to the Ozenfant Academy of Fine Arts established by the French modernist Amédée Ozenfant in London (1936–38). She was one of the first students at the Academy, the others being Stella Snead and Ursula Goldfinger, under the instruction of Sari Dienes, who co-directed the school. She remained friends with Dienes throughout her life.

She became familiar with Surrealism from a copy of Herbert Read's book, Surrealism (1936), given to her by her mother, but she received little encouragement from her family to forge an artistic career. The Surrealist poet and patron Edward James was the champion of her work in Britain; James bought many of her paintings and arranged a show in 1947 for her work at the Pierre Matisse Gallery in New York. Some works are still hanging at James' former family home, currently West Dean College in West Dean, West Sussex.

== Association with Max Ernst ==
In 1936 Carrington saw the work of the German Surrealist Max Ernst at the International Surrealist Exhibition in London and was attracted to him before she even met him. In 1937 Carrington met Ernst at a party at the Goldfingers' in London with Sari Dienes, who was a friend of Ernst. The artists bonded and returned together to Paris, where Ernst promptly separated from his wife. In 1938 they left Paris and settled in Saint-Martin-d'Ardèche in southern France. The new couple collaborated and supported each other's artistic development. The two artists created sculptures of guardian animals (Carrington created a plaster horse head, while Ernst created birds) to decorate their home in Saint-Martin-d'Ardèche. In 1939 Carrington and Ernst painted portraits of each other. Both capture the ambivalence in their relationship, but whereas Ernst's The Triumph of Love features both artists in the composition, Carrington's Portrait of Max Ernst focused solely on Ernst and is laced with heavy symbolism. The portrait was not her first Surrealist work; between 1937 and 1938 Carrington painted Self-Portrait, also called The Inn of the Dawn Horse, now exhibited at the Metropolitan Museum of Art. Sporting white jodhpurs and a wild mane of hair, Carrington is perched on the edge of a chair in this curious, dreamlike scene, her hand outstretched toward a prancing hyena and her back to a tailless rocking horse flying behind her.

With the outbreak of World War II Ernst, who was German, was arrested by the French authorities for being a "hostile alien." With the intercession of Paul Éluard, and other friends, including the American journalist Varian Fry, he was released a few weeks later. Soon after the Nazis invaded France, Ernst was arrested again, this time by the Gestapo, because his art was considered by the Nazis to be "degenerate." He managed to escape and flee to the United States with the help of Peggy Guggenheim, who was a sponsor of the arts.

After Ernst's arrest Carrington was devastated and agreed to go to Spain with a friend, Catherine Yarrow. She stayed with family friends in Madrid, and soon experienced two traumatic events. First, while she was alone in a cafe, Spanish soldiers took her to a hotel where they gang-raped her. Second, after a psychotic break caused by her paralyzing anxiety and delusions, she was admitted into an asylum in Santander. She was treated with Cardiazol shock therapy and Luminal (a barbiturate). She was released from the asylum into the care of a keeper, and was told that her parents had decided to send her to a sanatorium in South Africa. En route to South Africa, she stopped in Portugal, where she made her escape. She went to the Mexican diplomatic mission to find Renato Leduc, a poet and the Mexican diplomat. They had been introduced in Paris by their common acquaintance Pablo Picasso (the men knew each other from bull fights) and he agreed to a marriage of convenience with Carrington so that she would be accorded the immunity given to a diplomat's wife. She took Mexican nationality in 1942. The pair divorced in 1943. Meanwhile, Ernst had married Peggy Guggenheim in New York in 1941. That marriage ended a few years later. Ernst and Carrington never resumed their relationship.

== Mexico ==
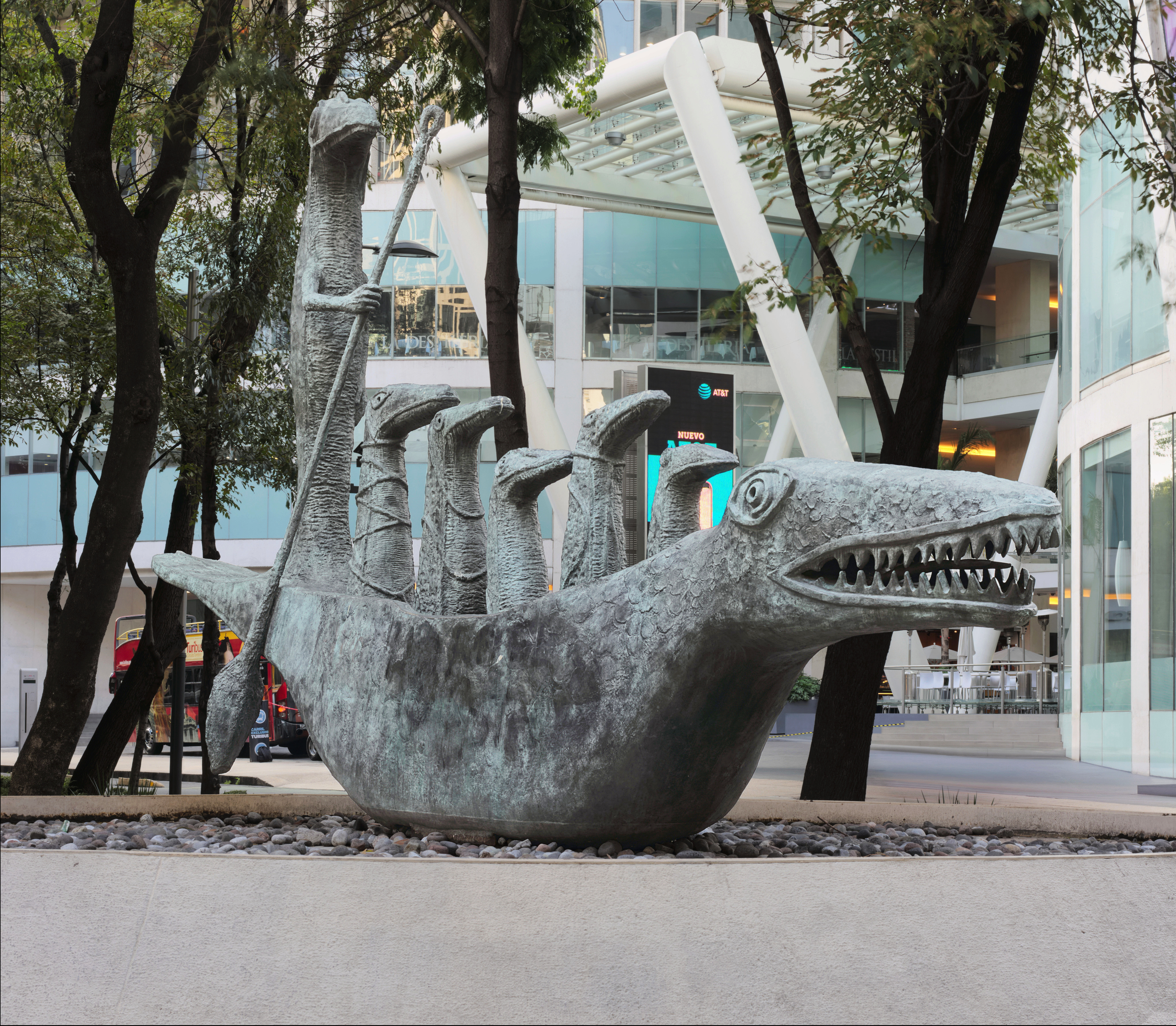
How Doth the Little Crocodile on Paseo de la Reforma. The statue was donated to Mexico City by Carrington in 2000 and was moved to its current location in 2006.

After spending a year in New York, in 1942 Leduc and Carrington went to Mexico—where many European artists fled in search of asylum—which she grew to love and where she lived, on and off, for the rest of her life.

When Carrington first came to Mexico she was preceded by the success of Surrealist exhibitions which allowed her to create many connections within the movement. Her connections within these Surrealist circles were influential in opening artistic doors that had long been closed to Mexican artists. After living in Mexico for seven years, Carrington held her first solo exhibition at the Galeria Clardecor. Much of the initial response from the public was very encouraging, and for months afterwards the press published positive and approving reviews.

After spending part of the 1960s in New York City, Carrington lived and worked in Mexico once again. While in Mexico she was asked, in 1963, to create a mural which she named El Mundo Magico de los Mayas, and which was influenced by folk stories from the region. The mural is now located in the Museo Nacional de Antropología in Mexico City.

In 1973 Carrington designed Mujeres conciencia, a poster for the Women's Liberation movement in Mexico, depicting a 'new Eve.' In the 1970s, female artists of previous waves and generations responded to the more liberal climate and movement of the array of feminist waves. Many pushed the issues of women's liberation and consciousness within their work while others spoke out on issues instead of making art. Carrington frequently spoke about women's "legendary powers" and the need for women to take back "the rights that belonged to them." Many artists involved in surrealism regarded women to be useful as muses but not as artists in their own right. Carrington was adopted as a femme-enfant by the Surrealists because of her rebelliousness against her upper-class upbringing.

Carrington primarily focused on psychic freedom in the belief that such freedom cannot be achieved until political freedom is also accomplished. Through these beliefs Carrington understood that "greater cooperation and sharing of knowledge between politically active women in Mexico and North America" was important for emancipation. Carrington's political commitment led to her winning the Lifetime Achievement Award at the Women's Caucus for Art convention in New York in 1986. Throughout the decade women identified and defined an array of relationships to feminist and mainstream concepts and concerns. Continuing through the decade, women continued to question the meaning of existence through form and material.

I didn't have time to be anyone's muse... I was too busy rebelling against my family and learning to be an artist.

— Leonora Carrington

== Second marriage and children ==
She later married Emerico Weisz (nicknamed "Chiki"), born in Hungary in 1911, a photographer and the darkroom manager for Robert Capa during the Spanish Civil War. Together they had two sons: Gabriel, an intellectual and poet, and Pablo, a doctor and Surrealist artist. Chiki Weisz died on 17 January 2007, at home. He was 95 years old.

== Death ==
Leonora Carrington died on 25 May 2011, aged 94, in a hospital in Mexico City as a result of complications arising from pneumonia. Her remains were buried at Panteón Inglés (English Cemetery) in Mexico City.

== Themes and major works ==
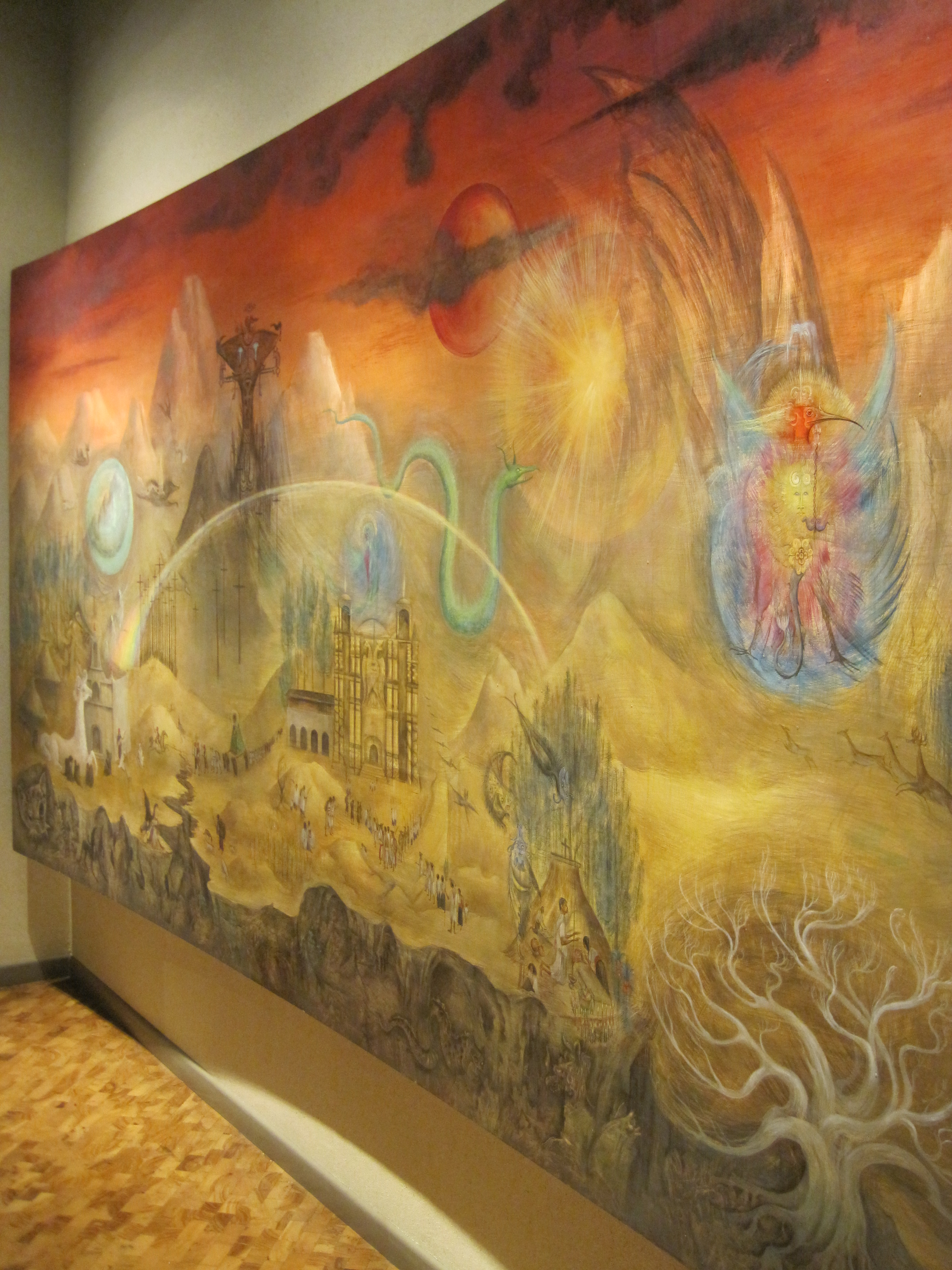
Leonora Carrington, The Magical World of the Mayans (1963–1964), National Anthropology Museum

Carrington stated that: "I painted for myself...I never believed anyone would exhibit or buy my work." She was not interested in the writings of Sigmund Freud, as were other Surrealists in the movement. She instead focused on magical realism and alchemy and used autobiographical detail and symbolism as the subjects of her paintings. Carrington was interested in presenting female sexuality as she experienced it, rather than as that of male Surrealists' characterization of female sexuality. Carrington's work of the 1940s is focused on the underlying theme of women's role in the creative process.

Carrington's work is identified and compared with the Surrealist movement. Within the movement, there was a strong exploration of the woman's body combined with the mysterious forces of nature. During this time, female artists correlated the feminine figure with creative nature while using ironic stances.

When painting, she used small-brushstroke techniques, building up layers in a meticulous manner, creating rich imagery.

In Self-Portrait (Inn of the Dawn Horse) (1937–38), Carrington reflects on her own identity, associating herself with both the horse and hyena. She offers her own interpretation of female sexuality by looking toward her own sexual reality rather than theorizing on the subject, as was custom by other Surrealists in the movement. Carrington's move away from the characterization of female sexuality subverted the traditional male role of the Surrealist movement. Self-Portrait (1937–38) also offers insight into Carrington's interest in the "alchemical transformation of matter and her response to the Surrealist cult of desire as a source of creative inspiration." Self Portrait further explores the duality that comes with being a woman. This concept of duality is explored by Carrington using a mirror to assert duality of the self and the self being an observer with being observed. The hyena depicted in Self-Portrait (1937–38) joins both male and female into a whole, metaphoric of the worlds of the night and the dream. The symbol of the hyena is present in many of Carrington's later works, including "La Debutante" in her book of short stories The Oval Lady.

Three years after being released from the asylum and with the encouragement of André Breton, Carrington wrote about her psychotic experience in her memoir Down Below. In this, she explained how she had a nervous breakdown, didn't want to eat, and left Spain. This is where she was imprisoned in an asylum. She illustrates all that was done to her: ruthless institutional therapies, sexual assault, hallucinatory drugs, and unsanitary conditions. It has been suggested that the events of the book should not be taken literally, given Carrington's state at the time of her institutionalization; however, recent authors have sought to examine the details of her institution in order to discredit this theory. She also created art to depict her experience, such as her Portrait of Dr. Morales and Map of Down Below. Another small work, Villa Pilar, painted while she was undergoing treatment, was given to the supervising doctor Luis Morales and was kept by his family.

Her book The Hearing Trumpet deals with aging and the female body. It follows the story of older women who, in the words of Madeleine Cottenet-Hage in her essay "The Body Subversive: Corporeal Imagery in Carrington, Prassinos and Mansour", seek to destroy the institutions of their imaginative society to usher in a "spirit of sisterhood." The Hearing Trumpet also criticizes the shaming of the nude female body, and it is believed to be one of the first books to tackle the notion of gender identity in the twentieth century. Carrington's views situated motherhood as a key experience to being a woman. Carrington stated, "We, women, are animals conditioned by maternity.... For female animals love-making, which is followed by the great drama of the birth of a new animal, pushes us into the depths of the biological cave." While this may seem to differ from certain modern feminist perspectives, the cave, of which Carrington offers many versions, is the setting for a symbolic coming to life, not an actual birth-giving ("and this can mean aquatic or maternal, this can be double, in my opinion"; mère and mer, following Simone de Beauvoir).

Carrington had an interest in animals, myth, and symbolism. This interest became stronger after she moved to Mexico and started a relationship with the émigré Spanish artist Remedios Varo. The two studied alchemy, the kabbalah, and the post-classic Mayan mystical writings, Popol Vuh.

The first important exhibition of her work appeared in 1947 at the Pierre Matisse Gallery in New York City. Carrington was invited to show her work in an international exhibition of Surrealism, where she was the only female English professional painter. She became a celebrity almost overnight. In Mexico, she authored and successfully published several books.

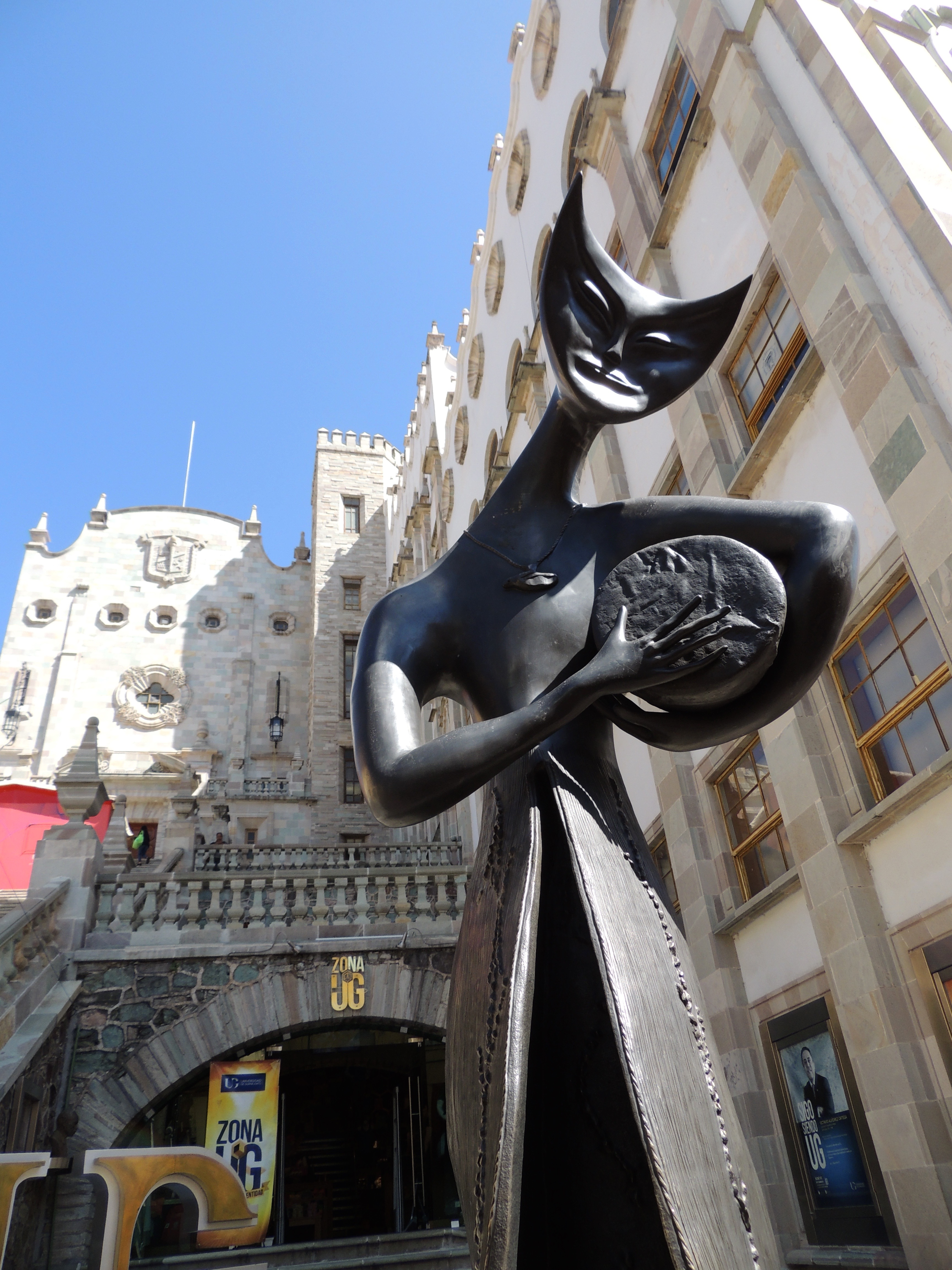
Sculpture by Carrington on display near the University of Guanajuato during the 2015 Festival Internacional Cervantino

The first major exhibition of her work in the UK for twenty years took place at Chichester's Pallant House Gallery, West Sussex, from 17 June to 12 September 2010, and subsequently in Norwich at the Sainsbury Centre for Visual Arts, as part of a season of major international exhibitions called Surreal Friends that celebrated the role of women in the Surrealist movement. Her work was exhibited alongside pieces by her close friends, the Spanish painter Remedios Varo (1908–1963) and the Hungarian photographer Kati Horna (1912–2000).

In 2013 Carrington was the subject of a major retrospective at the Irish Museum of Modern Art, Dublin. Titled The Celtic Surrealist, it was curated by Sean Kissane and examined Carrington's Irish background to illuminate many cultural, political and mythological themes present in her work.

Carrington's art often depicts horses, as in her Self-Portrait (Inn of the Dawn Horse) and the painting The Horses of Lord Candlestick. Her fascination with drawing horses began in her childhood. Horses also appear in her writings. In her first published short story, "The House of Fear", Carrington portrays a horse in the role of a psychic guide to a young heroine. In 1935, Carrington's first essay, "Jezzamathatics or Introduction to the Wonderful Process of Painting", was published before her story "The Seventh Horse." Carrington often used codes of words to dictate interpretation in her artwork. "Candlestick" is a code that she commonly used to represent her family, and the word "lord" for her father.

Carrington contributed to the 1973 Mexican horror film The Mansion of Madness directed by Juan López Moctezuma, loosely based on the Edgar Allan Poe short story The System of Doctor Tarr and Professor Fether. She supervised the artistic design for the sets and costumes, with one of her sons, Gabriel Weisz. The repeated appearance of a white horse, Carrington's alter ego, and the elaborate surreal feasts and costumes show her influence and vision.

In 2005 Christie's auctioned Carrington's Juggler (El Juglar), and the realised price was USD $713,000, setting a new record for the highest price paid at auction for a living surrealist painter. Carrington painted portraits of the telenovela actor Enrique Álvarez Félix, son of actress María Félix, a friend of Carrington's first husband.

In 2015, Carrington was honoured through a Google Doodle commemorating her 98th birthday. The Doodle was based on her painting, How Doth the Little Crocodile, drawn in surrealist style. The painting was inspired by a poem in Lewis Carroll's Alice's Adventures in Wonderland, and this painting was eventually turned into Cocodrilo located on Paseo de la Reforma.

== Legacy and influence ==
Carrington is credited with feminising surrealism. Her paintings and writing brought a woman's perspective to what had otherwise been a largely male-dominated artistic movement. Carrington demonstrated that women should be seen as artists in their own right and not to be used as muses by male artists.

In 2022, the Venice Biennale 59th International Art Exhibition was titled The Milk of Dreams. This name is borrowed from a book by Carrington, in which, the Italian curator Cecilia Alemani says, she "describes a magical world where life is constantly re-envisioned through the prism of the imagination, and where everyone can change, be transformed, become something and someone else." In the same year, Carrington's short story The Debutante was adapted into an animated short film directed by Elizabeth Hobbs and starring Joanna David as the Debutante (Older) and the Mother, and Alexa Davies as the Hyaena.

Carrington's life inspired Out of This World: The Surreal Art of Leonora Carrington, a children's nonfiction book written by Michelle Markell and illustrated by Amanda Hall and which tells the story of Carrington's life and art as she pursues her creative talents and breaks with 20th-century conventions about the ways in which an upper-class women and debutantes should behave.

Carrington and her son were the subject of the experimental short film Leonora and Gabriel: An Instant. The film was made by Lizet Benrey at Carrington's residence in Mexico City. Carrington discussed the art in her home and life as a surrealist. The film premiered in 2012 at the San Diego Latino Film Festival.

In November 2023, a posthumous ceremony celebrating Carrington's works was held in the Senate of the Republic, the upper house of the Mexican Congress. The sculpture El jaguar de la noche was donated by the Museo Leonora Carrington to be displayed in the Senate Building. Additionally, a temporary exhibit, titled "Un Viaje Sagrado", with 11 of her sculptures was held in the Senate Building.

In May 2024 her painting Les Distractions de Dagobert was sold for $28.5 million at Sotheby's auction house in New York. At the time, this was a record amount paid for a work by a British-born female artist.

== Exhibitions ==
- 2026 Leonora Carrington: The Symptomatic Surreal, Freud Museum, London, 25 March - 10 August 2026, then Faro Santander from 8 September 2026.
- 2026: Leonora Carrington, Musée du Luxembourg, Paris, France, 18 February 2026 - 19 July 2026
- 2025: Leonora Carrington, Palazzo Reale, Milan, Italy, 20 September 2025 - 11 January 2026
- 2025: Forbidden Territories: 100 Years of Surreal Landscape, The Box Plymouth, Devon, UK, 24 May 2025 - 7 September 2025
- 2025: Leonora Carrington: Dream Weaver, Katonah Museum of Art, Katonah, NY, United States, 13 July 2025 - 5 October 2025
- 2024: Leonora Carrington: Avatars & Alliances, Firstsite, Colchester, England, 26 October 2024 - 9 March 2025
- 2024: Leonora Carrington: Rebel Visionary, Newlands House Gallery, Petworth, England, 12 July - 26 October 2024
- 2023: Leonora Carrington: Revelación, Fundación MAPFRE, Madrid, Spain, 11 February - 7 May 2023
- 2022: Surrealism and Magic: Enchanted Modernity, Museum Barberini, Potsdam, Germany, 22 October 2022 - 29 January 2023
- 2022: Leonora Carrington: El Mundo Magico, Mixografia, Los Angeles, California, United States, 9 July - 27 August 2022
- 2022: Surrealism and Magic: Enchanted Modernity, Peggy Guggenheim Collection, Venice, Italy, 9 April - 26 September 2022
- 2020: Fantastic Women, Louisiana Museum of Modern Art, Humlebæk, Denmark, 25 July - 8 November 2020
- 2019: Surrealism in Mexico – Exhibitions – Di Donna Galleries, New York City, United States, 25 April - 29 June 2019
- 2019: The Story of the Last Egg, Wendi Norris Offsite Exhibition, New York City, United States, 23 May - 29 June 2019
- 2018: The Leonora Carrington Museum opens in San Luis Potosí, México
- 2018: Leonora Carrington. Cuentos Mágicos, Museo de Arte Moderno de la Ciudad de México, Mexico, April - September 2018
- 2017: Mad About Surrealism, Museum Boijmans Van Beuningen, Netherlands, Rotterdam
- 2017: Surrealist Women, Mayoral, Barcelona, Spain, Barcelona
- 2016: Monstruosismos, Museo de Arte Moderno de Ciudad de México, Mexico, Bosque de Chapultepec
- 2016: Surreal Encounters. Collecting the Marvellous, Scottish National Gallery of Modern Art, Edinburgh, Scotland
- 2016: Dalí, Ernst, Miró, Magritte ... : Surreal Encounters from the Collections Edward James, Roland Penrose
- 2016: Gabrielle Keiller, Ulla and Heiner Pietzsch, Hamburger Kunsthalle, Hamburg, Germany
- 2016: Artists and Lovers, Ordovas Gallery, Mayfair, London, England
- 2016: Strange Worlds: The Vision of Angela Carter, Royal West of England Academy, Bristol, England
- 2016: Leonora Carrington: The Last Tuesday Society & Viktor Wynd's Museum of Curiosities, Fine Art & Natural History. Hackney, London, England, September - December 2016
- 2015: Leonora Carrington: Tate Liverpool, England, 6 March - 31 May 2015
- 2015: Surrealism and Magic, Boca Raton Museum of Art, Boca Raton, USA
- 2015: Kahlo, Rivera & Mexican Modern Art, NSU Art Museum, Fort Lauderdale, USA
- 2015: Mexico: Fantastic Identity. 20th Century Masterpieces from the FEMSA Collection, Museum of Latin American Art, Long Beach, USA
- 2015: Lorna Otero Project Album of Family, Miami, The Patricia & Phillip Frost Art Museum, Florida International University, Miami, USA
- 2015: Surrealism: The Conjured Life, Museum of Contemporary Art (MCA) Chicago, USA
- 2015: Fields of Dream: The Surrealist Landscape, Di Donna, New York City, USA
- 2014: Surrealism and Magic, Herbert F. Johnson Museum of Art, Cornell University, Ithaca, USA
- 2014: Paper, Pencil & Ink: Prints & Other Works on Paper, Ruiz-Healy Art, San Antonio, USA
- 2013: Max Ernst, Fondation Beyeler, Basel, Switzerland
- 2013–2014: Leonora Carrington: The Celtic Surrealist, Irish Museum of Modern Art, Dublin, Ireland (solo)
- 2012: In Wonderland: The Surrealist Adventures of Women Artists in Mexico and the United States, Los Angeles, USA
- 2012: County Museum of Art, La Brea Park, Los Angeles, USA
- 2011: Exultation: Sex, Death and Madness in Eight Surrealist Masterworks, Wendi Norris Gallery, New York City, USA
- 2011: The Colour of My Dreams The Surrealist Revolution in Art, Vancouver Art Gallery, Vancouver, Canada
- 2011: The Good, The Bad, The Ugly?, Museum of Latin American Art, Long Beach, USA
- 2011: Night Scented Stock, Marianne Boesky Gallery, 118 East 64th Street, New York City, USA
- 2011: Leonora Carrington & Tilly Losch, Viktor Wynd Fine Art Inc.
- 2010: Surreal Friends, Pallant House Gallery, Chichester, England and Sainsbury Centre for Visual Arts, Norwich, England.
- 2010: Divine Comedy, Sotheby's New York, New York City, USA
- 2009: Latitudes: Latin American Masters from the Femsa Collection, The Bowers Museum of Cultural Art, Santa Ana, USA
- 2009: Angels of Anarchy: Women Artists and Surrealism, Manchester Art Gallery, Manchester, England
- 2008: Arte Americas The Latin American Art Fair, Tresart, Coral Gables, USA
- 2008: Works from the Natasha and Jacques Gelman Collection of Modern Mexican Art, Irish Museum of Modern Art, Ireland, Dublin
- 2008: Talismanic Lens, Frey Norris Gallery, San Francisco, California, USA (solo)
- 2007: Surrealism: Dreams on Canvas, Nassau County Museum of Art, Roslyn Harbor, New York, USA
- 2003: Frida Kahlo, Diego Rivera and 20th Century Mexican Art: The Jacques and Natasha Gelman Collection, National Museum of Mexican Art, Chicago, Illinois, USA.
- 2001–2002: Surrealism: Desire Unbound, The Tate, London, England and The Metropolitan Museum of Art, New York City, USA
- 1999: Mirror Images: Women, Surrealism and Self-Representation, San Francisco Museum of Modern Art, San Francisco, California, USA.
- 1999: Surrealism: Two Private Eyes/The Nesuhi Ertegun and Daniel Filipacchi Collections, Solomon R. Guggenheim Museum, New York City, USA
- 1993: Regards des Femmes, Musée d'Art Moderne, Lieja, France
- 1993: Sujeto-Objeto, Museo Regional de Guanajuato, Guanajuato y Museo de Monterrey, Moneterrey, Mexico
- 1991: Galería de Arte del Auropuerto Internacional de la Ciudad de México, Mexico City, Mexico (solo)
- 1991: Serpentine Gallery, London, England (solo)
- 1991: Sainsbury Art Centre, Norwich, England (solo)
- 1991: Arnolfini, Bristol, England (solo)
- 1991: The Mexican Museum, San Francisco, California, USA (solo)
- 1990: Art Company, Leeds, England (solo)
- 1990: Brewster Gallery, New York City, USA (solo)
- 1989: Museo Nacional de la Estampa, INBA, Mexico (solo)
- 1987: Brewster Gallery, New York City, USA (solo)
- 1987: Art Space Mirage, Tokyo, Japan (solo)
- 1987: Alexander Iolas Gallery, New York City, USA (solo)
- 1976: Leonora Carrington: A retrospective exhibition, Center for Inter-American Relations, New York City, USA
- 1976: Leonora Carrington : a retrospective exhibition, University Art Museum, University of Texas at Austin, Austin, Texas, USA
- 1970: Impressionism to Surrealism, Worthing Art Gallery, Worthing, England
- 1969: The Surrealists, Byron Gallery, New York City, USA
- 1969: Galerie Pierre, Paris, France (solo)
- 1969: Instituto Nacional de Bellas Artes, Sala Nacional, Mexico (solo)
- 1969: Palacio de Bellas Artes, Mexico City, Mexico (solo)
- 1969: Galería de Arte Mexicano, Mexico City, Mexico (solo)
- 1968: Artistas Británicos en México 1800/1968, Instituto Anglo-Mexicano de Cultura, Mexico City, Mexico
- 1967: IX Bienal de Pintura, São Paulo, Brazil
- 1966: Surrealism: A State of Mind, Universidad de California, Santa Barbara, California, USA
- 1966: Surrealismo y Arte Fantástico en México, Galeria Universitaria, Aristos, Mexico
- 1965: Galería Antonio Souza, Mexico City, Mexico (solo)
- 1965: Instituto Cultural Anglo-Mexicano, Mexico City, Mexico (solo)
- 1965: Galería Clardecor, Mexico City, Mexico (solo)
- 1963: Pictures in the Edward James Collection, Worthing Art Gallery, Worthing, England
- 1961: El Retrato Mexicano Contemporáneo, Museo de Arte Moderno, Mexico City, Mexico
- 1959: Eros Galerie, Daniel Cordier, Paris, France
- 1956: Galería de Arte Mexicano, Mexico City, Mexico (solo)
- 1943: Exhibition by 31 Women, the Art of This Century gallery, New York City, USA
- 1943: 20th Century Portraits, Museum of Modern Art, New York City, USA
- 1942: First Papers of Surrealism, Madison Avenue Gallery, New York City, USA
- 1942: Pierre Matisse Gallery, New York City, USA (solo)
- 1938: Esposition du Surréalisme, Galerie Robert, Amsterdam, the Netherlands
- 1938: Exposition Internationale du Surréalisme, Galerie Beaux-Arts, Paris, France

== Books ==
=== Novels ===
- The Hearing Trumpet (Routledge, 1976; Penguin Books, 2005, ISBN 9780141187990; New York Review Books, 2021)
- The Stone Door (New York: St. Martin's Press, 1977; New York Review Books, 2024)

=== Short story collections ===
- The Oval Lady: Surreal Stories (Capra Press, 1975)
- The Seventh Horse and Other Tales (Dutton, 1988)
- The House of Fear (Trans. K. Talbot and M. Warner. New York: E. P. Dutton, 1988)
- The Debutante and Other Stories (Silver Press, 2017)
- The Complete Stories of Leonora Carrington (Dorothy, a publishing project, 2017. Introduction by Kathryn Davis)

=== Plays ===
- Une chemise de nuit de flanelle, Libr. Les Pas Perdus, 1951, translated by Yves Bonnefoy, with a cover by Max Ernst
- Opus Siniestrus: Selected Plays (New York Review Books, 2026)

=== Memoirs ===
- Down Below (VVV magazine, 1944; Black Swan Press, 1983; New York Review Books, 2017)

=== Miscellaneous ===
- La Maison de la peur, H. Parisot, 1938 – with illustrations by Max Ernst
- El mundo mágico de los mayas, Museo Nacional de Antropología, 1964 – illustrated by Leonora Carrington
- The Milk of Dreams (illustrated edition. New York: NYR Children's Collection, 2017)

== Artworks ==
- Self-Portrait (Inn of the Dawn Horse), 1936–1937, The Metropolitan Museum of Art, The Pierre and Maria-Gaetana Matisse Collection
- Green Tea, 1942, Museum of Modern Art
- The Horses of Lord Candlestick, 1938 (private collection)
- The Meal of Lord Candlestick, 1938
- Portrait of Max Ernst, c. 1939, Scottish National Gallery of Modern Art
- The Temptation of St. Anthony, 1945, Private collection
- Les Distractions de Dagobert, 1945. Considered most significant painting of her career. Sold for £22.5 million in 2024.
- The Kitchen Garden on the Eyot, 1946, San Francisco Museum of Modern Art
- The Giantess (The Guardian of the Egg), 1947 (private collection)
- The Old Maids, 1947, Sainsbury Centre for Visual Arts University of East Anglia
- And Then We Saw the Daughter of the Minotaur, 1953, Museum of Modern Art
- Fil d’Or, 1953, Private Collection (until 2026)
- The Bird Bath, 1974
- The Memory Tower, 1995, The Viktor Wynd Museum of Curiosities, Fine Art & Natural History, London
- How Doth the Little Crocodile, 1998
- Gatomaquia, 2009, Museo Leonora Carrington, Mexico

== See also ==
- Women Surrealists
