= Kati Horna =

Mexican photographer of Hungarian origin

- Born: Katalin Deutsch; May 19, 1912; Szilasbalhás, Magyar Királyság (Mezőszilas, Austria-Hungary)
- Died: October 19, 2000 (aged 88)
- Notable work: Umbral, Nosotros
- Style: photojournalism, Surrealist
- Spouse: José Horna

Kati Horna (May 19, 1912 – October 19, 2000), born Katalin Deutsch, was a Hungarian-born Mexican photojournalist, surrealist photographer and teacher. She was born in Budapest, at the time part of the Austrian-Hungarian Empire, lived in France, Germany, Spain, and later was naturalized Mexican. Most of her work was considered lost during the Spanish Civil War. She was one of the influential women photographers of her time. Through her photographs she was able to change the way that people viewed war. One way that Horna was able to do this was through the utilization of a strategy called "gendered witnessing". Gendered witnessing consisted of putting a feminist view on the notion that war was a predominantly masculine thing.

Horna became a legendary photographer after taking on a woman's perspective of the war. She was able to focus on the behind-of-the-scenes, which led her to portraying the impact that war had on women and children. One of her most striking images is the Tête de poupée (doll's head). Horna worked for various magazines including Mujeres and S.NOB, in which she published a series of fétiches, but even her more commercial commissions often contained surreal touches

== Biography ==
=== Early years ===
Kati Horna was born in 1912 to an upper-middle-class Jewish family in the Austrian-Hungarian Empire during an unstable sociopolitical period. As a result of the First World War, Budapest - where Horna grew up - suffered severe economic setbacks which continued in the years between the two World Wars.

Her father was a banker from the prosperous part of Buda. When he died, photography offered Horna the means to earn a living and the chance to fulfill her political ideals. The surrounding violence, danger and injustice of that time influenced her ideology profoundly.

As a teenager, Horna lived in Berlin, where she met Bertolt Brecht and was influenced by Bauhaus, Surrealism, and Constructivist artist Lajos Kassak, whose views on photography as an agent of social change aligned with Horna's views. Another important influence on her personal ideology was Marxist theoretician Karl Korsch, who trained her in radical politics, which added to her love for narrative photography.

At the age of twenty, Horna became an apprentice in the workshop of photographer József Pecsi. At this prestigious school in Budapest, she learned basic photographic techniques. She also met Robert Capa (then by the name Endre Friedmann) there, and the two photographers remained friends until Capa's death in 1954. Some of the wars that Capa was able to capture included the Spanish Civil War and the Second Sino-Japanese War. While Capa had his lens focused on the action-packed battlefront, the more reserved Kati took compassionate, visionary pictures of those affected by the war, capturing the resilience of women under siege. Capa favored working at the front lines of the war; capturing shots such as The Falling Soldier [1936]. Horna and Capa were part of the same left-wing political movement and photographed each other's portraits.

When Capa moved to Paris, she followed him in 1933, where she turned her attention to the life she saw around her in the streets and cafés of the French capital. Her series for the French Agence Photo (1934) revealed her keen eye for irony and fun. The series Flea Markets (1933) and Reportage dans les Cafés de Paris (1934) are from this period. Besides photographing realistic scenes, she also ventured into more experimental work, closer to Surrealism. Even though Horna gained much popularity, she preferred to stay out of the limelight and work for smaller organizations such as the magazine Umbral.

=== Spanish Civil War ===
In 1937, during the Spanish Civil War, she moved to Barcelona and was commissioned by the Spanish Republican government and the Confederación Nacional del Trabajo to document the war as well as record everyday life of communities on the front lines, such as in Aragón, Valencia, Madrid, and Lérida. She photographed elderly women, young children, babies and mothers, and was later considered visionary for her choice of subject matter. Horna's images, published in anarchist newspapers, magazines and pamphlets, revealed the brutal effects of the war on civilians under siege. This was a different perspective for a different kind of war: the first major European conflict not confined to the battlefield. She was editor of the magazine Umbral, where she met her later husband José Horna, a craftsman and sculptor. Some of her photos were used as posters for the Republican cause. Horna also collaborated with other magazines, most of which were of anarchist ideology, such as Tiempos Nuevos, Libre-Studio, Mujeres Libres and Tierra y Libertad. Her images of scenes from the civil war not only revealed her Republican sympathies, but also gained her almost legendary status.^{[where?]}

=== France ===
With José Horna, Kati escaped to Paris in 1939 after being pushed out by the Spanish Fascist authorities. Being appalled by the great amount of poverty that could be observed at the time, Horna's career took a new direction: While in Paris she was a reporter for Lutetia-Press. Horna was also reunited with her friend Robert Capa, who inspired her not only for poetic photo narratives and staged shots, but also for her recurrent theme of masks and dolls.

During the Nazi occupation of France, Kati and José were married and later sought refuge in Mexico, where she met other artists, who were also fleeing from war-torn Europe: Remedios Varo, Benjamín Péret, Emeric "Chiki" Weisz, Edward James, Tina Modotti and Leonora Carrington. Kati Horna and this group of artists in exile became a tight knit circle of friends. The friendship between Kati Horna, Remedios Varo, and Leonora Carrington would later be showcased in the 2010 exhibition Surreal Friends. One of Kati Horna's most well-known photographs captures Remedios Varo, wearing one of her masks.

=== Mexico ===
Horna arrived in Mexico in October 1939, at the age of 27. Mexico became for her a "motherland", and she confessed her patriotism only for this country. Living in Mexico for the rest of her life, she was a contributor to magazines such as Todo (1939), Mapa (1940), Enigma (1941), El arte de cocinar (1944), Seguro Social (1944), among others.

Nosotros magazine hired her as a full-time photographer in 1944. There she published series like Títeres en la penitenciaría [Puppets in the Penitentiary] or portraits of Alfonso Reyes in his library. In 1958, Horna was the chief photo editor of Mujeres magazine. During the second half of the 20th century she also did sporadic commissions for the Revista de la Universidad de México, Mexico This Month, Tiempo, S.nob, Mujer de Hoy, Mujeres: Expresión Femenina, Revista de Revistas, Diseño, Vanidades, Arquitectura, Arquitectos de México, Obras. She also carried out more experimental projects that bear the imprint of surrealism.

Architecture was another field that Kati Horna explored with interest. She collaborated with various architects like Luis Barragán, Carlos Lazo and Ricardo Legorreta, and documented buildings with historical value in order to provide a register of their conditions. Horna also published photos of recently inaugurated public buildings, like the Museo Nacional de Antropología [National Museum of Anthropology], the Ciudad Universitaria [University Campus], and the Biblioteca Nacional [National Library]. In 1967, Kati Horna took photos of the pre-Olympic games for the architect Pedro Ramírez Vázquez. Horna's interest in architectural photography also expanded into capturing deteriorated and dilapidated buildings. This side of her photography corresponds to her Surrealist connections, as the subjects captured in these pieces allow for multiple interpretations.

Between 1958 and the early 1990s, she was also a professor at the Escuela Nacional de Artes Plásticas, UNAM at the Academia de San Carlos and the Universidad Iberoamericana. Some of her most well-known works include What Goes in the Basket (1939), La Castañeda (1945), Fetiches (1962), Ode to Necrophilia (1962), Sucedió en Coyoacán (1962), Mujer y Máscara (1963), and Una Noche en el Sanatorio de Muñecas (1963).

Kati Horna died in October 2000. Her work has been included in numerous exhibitions in Mexico, Spain, and other countries. Kati Horna's archive and the copyrights to her work are handled by the Archivo Privado de Fotografía y Gráfica Kati y José Horna in Mexico City.

== Legacy ==
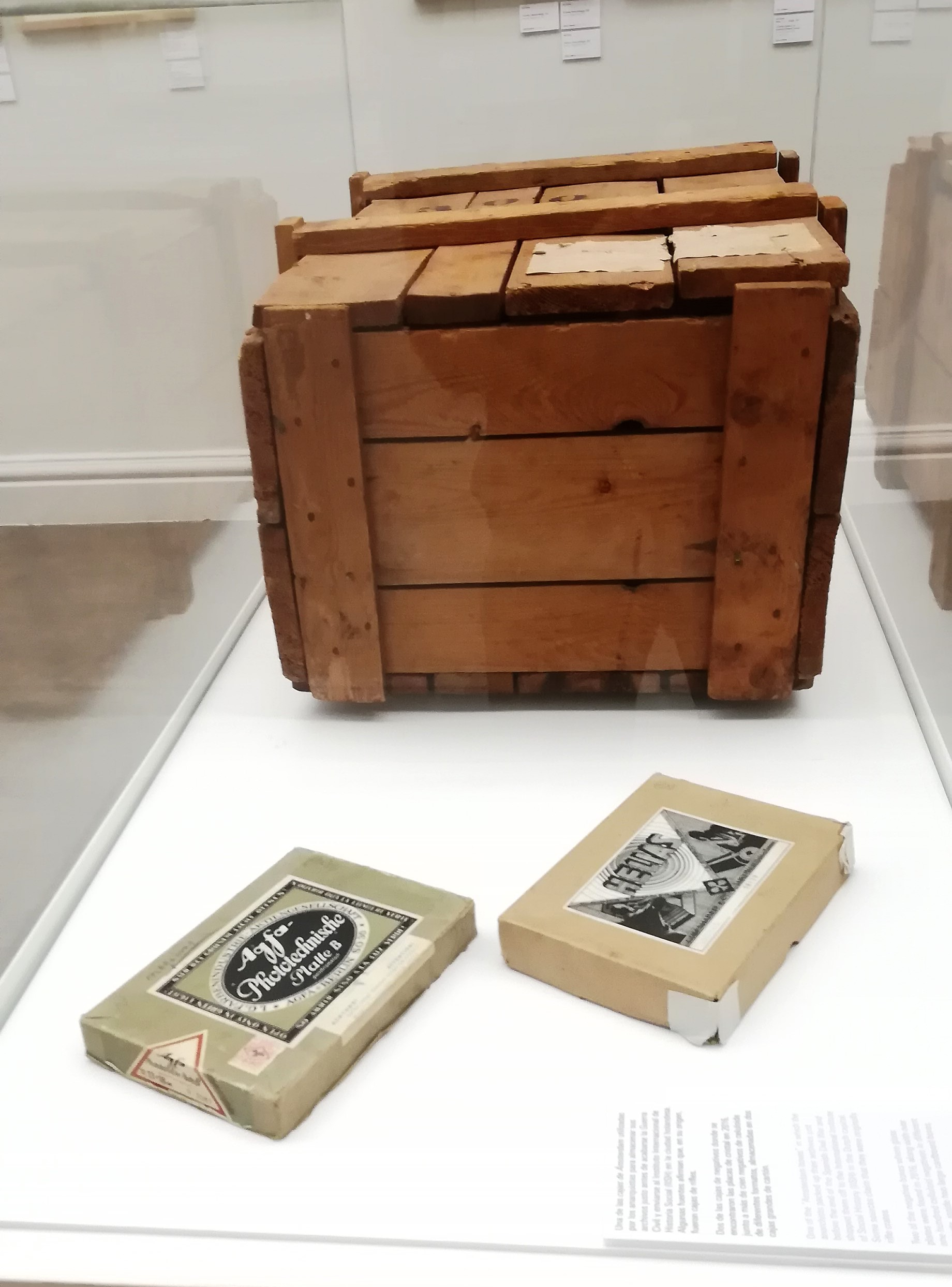
Historical crate with photographs and paper boxes from Spanish Civil War

During the Spanish Civil War, Horna had used her Rolleiflex camera in Barcelona and other places in Catalonia for the public relations office of the anarchist movement CNT-FAI (Confederación Nacional del Trabajo and Federación Anarquista Ibérica). These were used by the propaganda commissariat of the CNT-FAI in an effort to encourage morale and action in their fight against the Spanish Fascist movement. At the end of the civil war, her photographs along with other documents were shipped in wooden crates to the International Institute of Social History (IISH) in Amsterdam. Overlooked and forgotten in the crates, her and fellow photographer Margaret Michaelis's photographs were only rediscovered after 80 years by Spanish art historian and curator Almudena Rubio. Most of these pictures had never been published and were presented for the first time in an exhibition in Madrid during the PhotoEspaña festival in June 2022.

Horna's pictures from the forgotten crates include scenes of the human conditions in a prison, of people having free haircuts at a collectivised barbershop, of a former church converted into a carpentry workshop and of trenches on the front in Aragón. On the occasion of the Madrid exhibition, Rubio was quoted:

"The legacy of the work of Michaelis and Horna is unique, precisely because it shows us the rearguard revolutionary experience, neglected by official historiography, that was instigated by the anarchists of the CNT-FAI. At the same time, it allows us to reconstruct in more detail the life of the two photographers during the civil war, and better to appreciate their work in antifascist Spain."

== Exhibitions ==
- 1992: Kati Horna. Fotografías de la guerra civil española (1937-1938), University of Salamanca (Spain)
- 1995 Krinsky, Emma Cecilia García. Kati Horna: Recuento de una obra. Fondo Kati Horna, CENIDIAP-INBA, 1995.
- October 29 - November 21, 2009: Retratos de la contienda, Palacio de la Merced, Córdoba (Spain)
- June 19 - September 12, 2010: Surreal Friends: Leonora Carrington, Remedios Varo and Kati Horna, Pallant House Gallery, Chichester (United Kingdom)
- September 14 - November 26, 2012: Nostalgia por lo perdido / Asombro por lo encontrado, Museo de Arte Contemporáneo de Oaxaca - MACO (Mexico)
- December 7, 2013 - April 28, 2014: Kati Horna, Museo Amparo, Puebla (Mexico). The exhibition toured to the Musée du Jeu de Paume, Paris (June 3 - September 21, 2014) and the Museo de Arte Contemporáneo de Monterrey - MARCO (January 30 - May 24, 2015).
- September 14 - December 17, 2016: Told and Untold: The Photo Stories of Kati Horna in the Illustrated Press , Americas Society, New York (USA)
