= Federico Cantú Garza =

Mexican painter, engraver and sculptor (1907-1989)

Federico Cantú
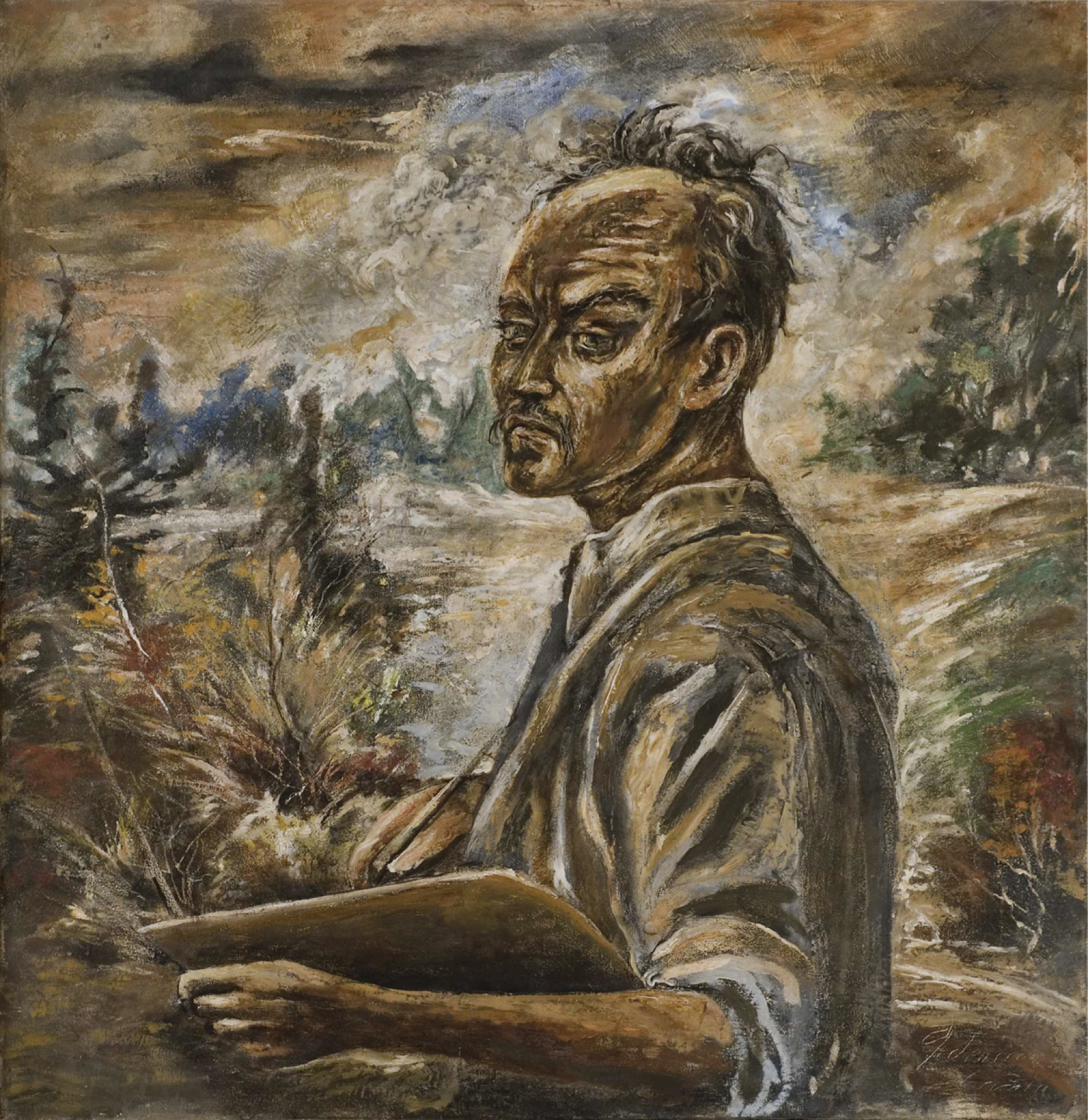
- Self portrait dated 1950
- Born: Federico Heraclio Cantú Garza; March 3, 1907; Cadereyta Jiménez
- Died: January 29, 1989 (aged 81); Mexico City
- Known for: painting, engraving, sculpture
- Notable work: IMSS - Mural Pinacoteca V México- Enseñanzas de Quetzalcoatl -Enseñanzas del Cura Hidalgo- Tira de la Peregrinacion Azteca - Crsito Muerto- Cuatro jinetes del Apocalipsis-El triunfo de la Muerte-Zapata Tierra y libertad-Viacriccis-Xilonetl- Leda y el Cisne-Monumento Alfonso Reyes
- Movement: Mexican muralism

Federico Heraclio Cantú Garza (March 3, 1907 – January 29, 1989) was a Mexican painter, engraver and sculptor. While considered to be a member of the Mexican muralism movement, his style was noticeably different, mostly for adhering to older and more academic forms of painting and sculpture. He had his most success exhibiting in the United States and Europe, but he did murals and sculptures in Mexico. His best known work is a sculpture called La maternidad which was adapted as the logo of the Instituto Mexicano de Seguro Social (IMSS).

== Life ==
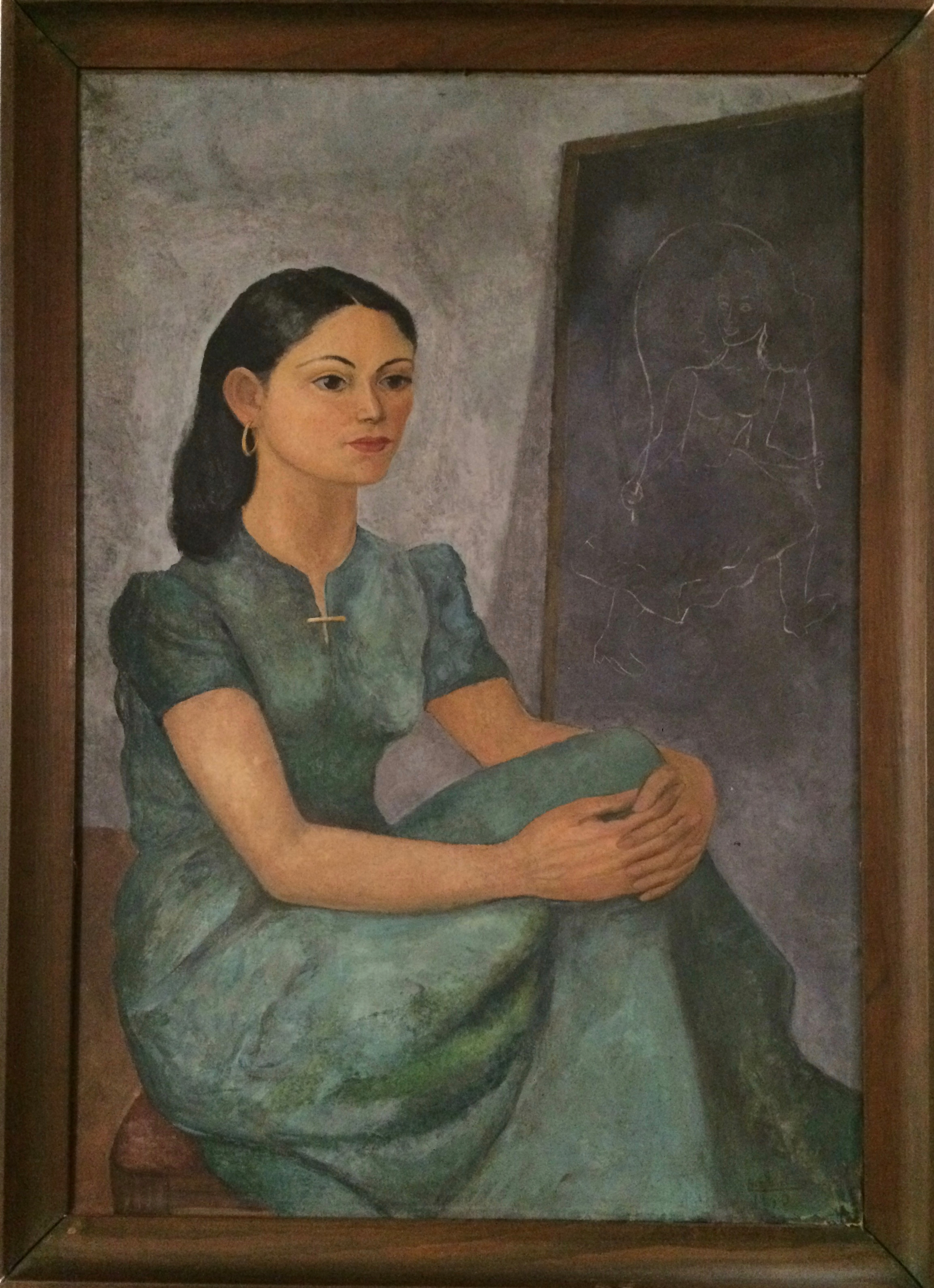
Portrait of Cantú's first wife Luz Fabila

Cantú was born to María Luiza Garza, a novelist, and Adolfo Cantú, a journalist who opposed the Porfirio Díaz regime. He was born shortly before the Mexican Revolution and spent his childhood split between Nuevo León and San Antonio, Texas, with the family moving back permanently to Mexico in the 1920s. He was born on March 3, 1907, in Monterrey, but later in life, he changed his birth year to 1908 and his birthplace to Cadereyta Jiménez, where his family was originally from.

In 1922, at age 14, Cantú entered the Escuela de Pintura al Aire Libre, which was directed by Alfredo Ramos Martínez. He had contact with the growing Mexican muralism movement and briefly studied fresco painting under Diego Rivera in 1924.

From 1924 to 1934, he traveled and lived in Europe and the United States. He first went to live in Paris on Rue Delambre in Montparnasse, being only sixteen years old. During his time in Europe he met various artists of the avant garde of the time, including Picasso, Alfonso Reyes, poet César Vallejo and sculptor Mateo Hernández. He studied with sculptor Jose de Creeft. When he lived in Paris, he gathered a collection of drawings called the "Paris Collection" by his son Federico Cantú Fabila, FCF. However, during his time there, he created over two chests of drawings made at Le Grande Chaumière. These chests were lost.

In 1929, he married his first wife, Luz Fabila Montes de Oca.

His times in the United States were short periods. He left Europe for Mexico in 1934. In the 1930s, he joined a group of painters with the Inés Amor gallery but soon after, established a studio in New York, as friends of his from Montparnasse were there to escape the Second World War.

He died on January 29, 1989. His remains are at the foot of his mural Dios Padre y crucifixion (1959) at the chapel of the Universidad Intercontinental in Tlalpan.

== Career ==
Adolfo Cantú, artist, art historian and grandson of the artist in an interview about Cantú's life and work (in Spanish)

Cantú's career extended over 65 years and included exhibitions, monumental works, design, illustrations and more. From 1924 to 1931 he exhibited his work in the United States and Europe, with his first exhibition occurring at the Exposition Park Museum in Los Angeles. His first exhibition in Mexico was in 1933 at the Salón de Arte of the Secretaría de Educación Pública. While living in New York, he took part in several collective shows. He had much of his success in these two places, with other shows at Tate Gallery in London, the Museum of Modern Art, the Macy's Gallery and the Perls Gallery in New York.

He did monumental works such as murals and sculptures, with one of the first a mural with Roberto Montenegro in 1934. These works can be found at universities, government buildings and private homes. From 1951 to the early 1960s, he devoted most of his time painting murals in private homes, with a number of these since acquired by the government of Nuevo León. In the 1950s, he created a mural at the headquarters of the Instituto Mexicano de Seguro Social in Mexico City called Las Enseñanzas de Quetzalcoatl and another called Maternidad Yacente. The first was damaged by the 1985 Mexico City earthquake, and was repaired by his son, Cantu Fabila and his wife Elsa. In 1958 he sculpted two stone slabs for the exterior of the Unidad Independencia theater in Mexico City. However, the day after they were finished, they were robbed. A similar fate happened to one of the copies of the IMSS emblem. He created a low relief called El Flechador del sol in 1961 on the Sierra Madre along the highway between Linares and Galeana in the municipality of Iturbide, Nuevo León. However, this work crumbled in 2002, with recovered pieces now on display at a site museum. His last monument was designed in 1988, and was dedicated to Alfonso Reyes. One notable mural is Los informantes de Sahagún at the former monastery of San Diego, which was the site of the Pinacoteca Virreinal in Mexico City. He also created a mural dedicated to Greek myth at the Philosophy and Letters department of the Universidad Autónoma de Nuevo León. He also created murals for a church in San Miguel Allende but they were defaced due to a dispute between the artist the institution over how the characters were portrayed.

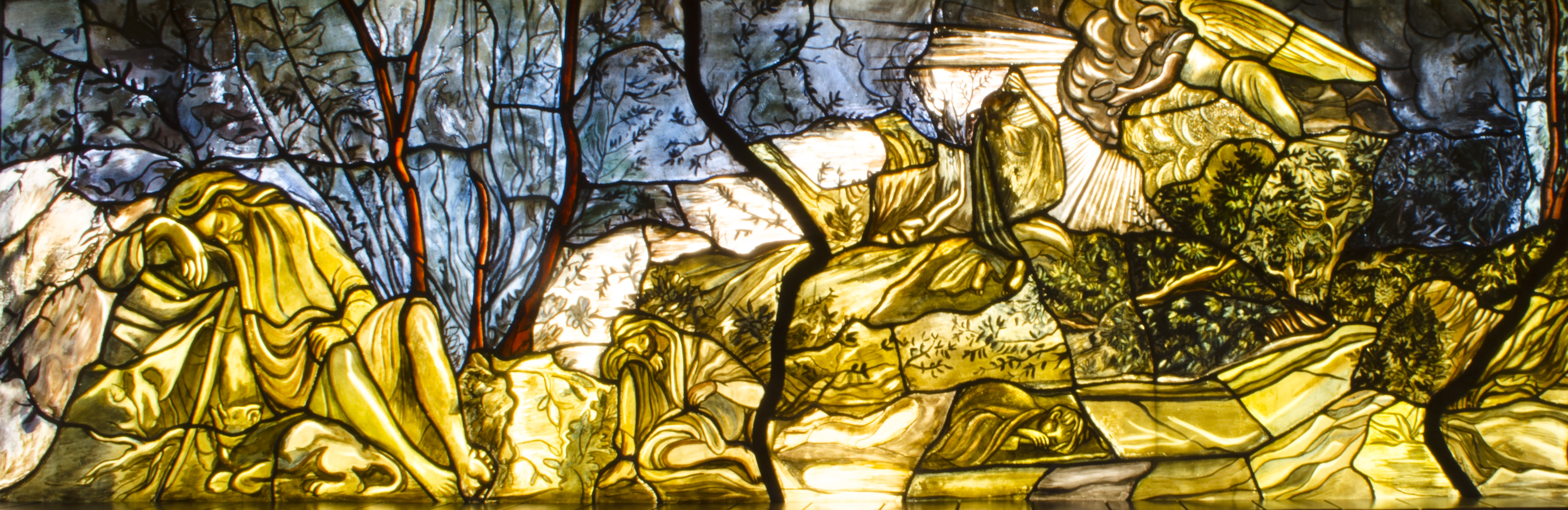
Stained glass piece called El Huerto de Getsemaní (1957) at the missionary chapel in the Sanctuary of Guadalupe in Monterrey

One of the murals he did in a private home was that of Benito Coquet, a public official. When he became head of IMSS in 1958, he hired Cantú to make sculptures and designs for the IMSS, Instituto Mexicano de Seguro Social. His best known sculpture from this relationship is La maternidad, which is used as the symbol of IMSS. The emblem is also known as "Nuestra Señora de Seguro Social" (Our Lady of Social Security).

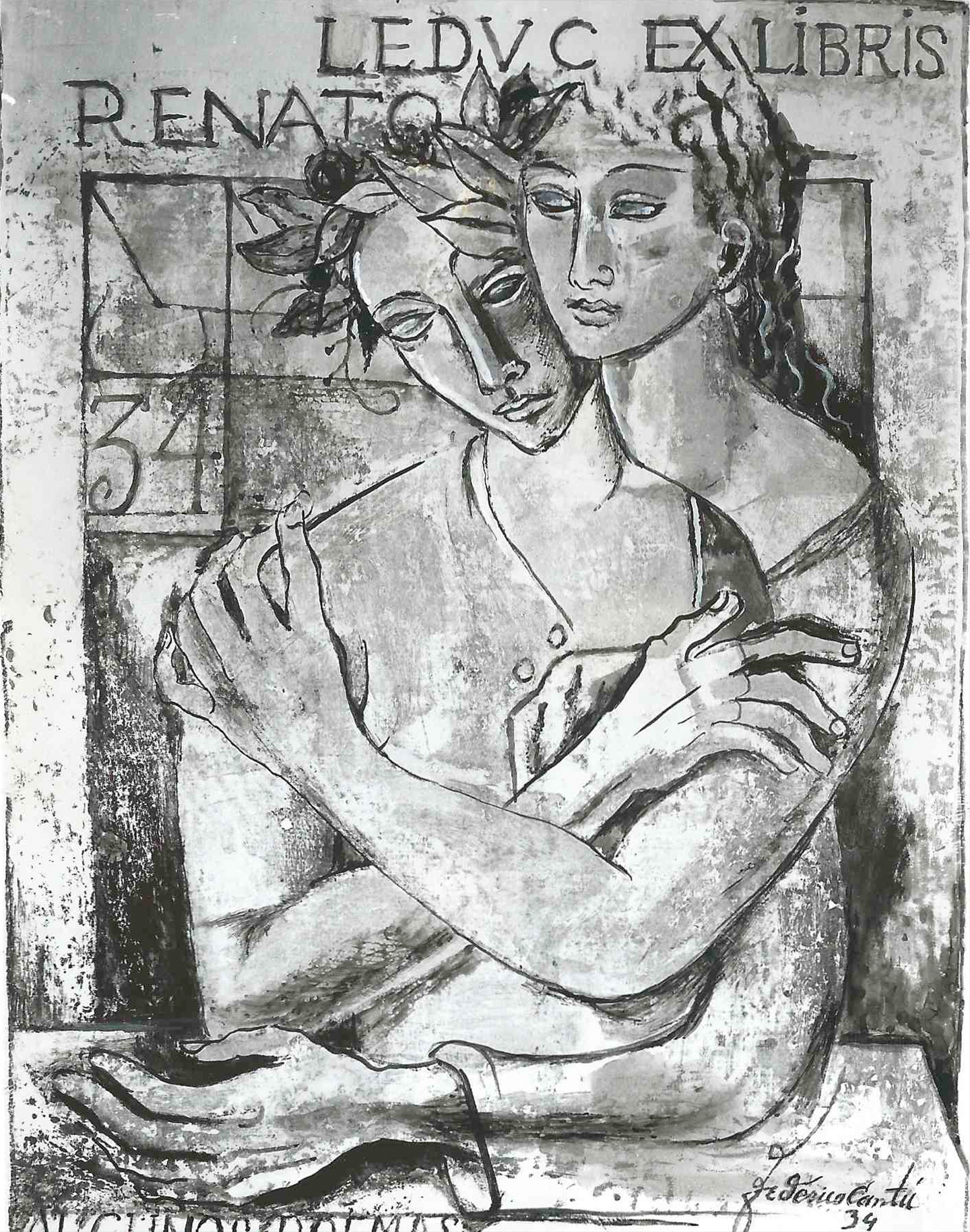
Illustration for Renato Leduc's work Poemas en Paris, from the Cantú Y de Teresa collection

In addition to canvas works and monumental pieces, Cantú worked on a number of other projects. In 1945, he began working with Carlos Alvarado Lang, creating burin engraving and dry point. He illustrated poems by writer friends such as Renato Leduc, Luis Cardoza y Aragón, Antonin Artaud and Alí Chumacero. His first monograph work and book was A Matter of Love by Mackinley Helm, which Cantú illustrated; both were published in 1946. In addition to the work he did for IMSS, other important sculptures include Las enseñanzas de Quetzalcóatl and Las enseñanzas de cura Hidalgo. However, a significant number of his works have been lost for various reasons, especially those done in Europe.

In addition, Cantú taught both in Mexico and the United States. In the 1940s, he was an instructor at the Escuela Nacional de Pintura, Escultura y Grabado "La Esmeralda". In 1951 he was a guest lecturer at the University of California.

His work can be found at the Universidad Autónoma de Nuevo León, the Basilica de la Purisima in Monterrey NL Letania, the former monastery of San Diego, the Pinacoteca Virreinal, the Charles Morgan Gallery in New York and Vatican City. He has been featured in a number of monographic publications and his work has been covered in books such as Cien años a través de cien artistas of the Museo de Arte Contemporáneo de Monterrey (2000) and Arte Nuestro of the Museo Metropolitano de Monterrey (2005). While alive, he had a retrospective at the Palacio de Bellas Artes in 1970, and was one of the few to receive homage at the same institution while alive in 1986.

After his death his work has still been sold and exhibited. In 2005, his painting Mujer Desnuda sold for 19,000 USD at Sotheby's. In 2007, the Universidad Autónoma del Estado de México held a large exhibition of his work for the 100th anniversary of his birth.

== Artistry ==
Cantú created watercolors, oils, drawings, inks, prints, monotypes, sculptures and murals. He was admired for the quality of his drawings, which incorporated the people and landscapes of Mexico into his historical and religious works.

In Europe, he was exposed to the avant garde movements of the time and in Mexico, the dominant form of Mexican muralism. However, Cantú's style was classical and academic, often combining classic myth with modern symbolism. This was true even of his mural work, and he was the only major painter at the time doing religious themes. This put him at the margins of his Mexican muralist contemporaries. He expressed his dissatisfaction with this situation: "Is it fair to discount me as a Mexican, just because my paints do not drip mole or sweat pulque?" However, he has come to be known as "El gran olvidado" (the great forgotten one).

He was an avid reader, with literature being a major influence on his work. He was especially fond of 15th-century French poet François Villon, but also read much of the work of Alfonso Reyes, Renato Leduc, Efraín Huerta, Jean Nicolas, Arthur Rimbaud, Paul Valéry, Lord Byron, Goethe, André Malraux, Antonin Artaud, and Paul Éluard.
