= Women surrealists =

Women involved with the surrealist movement

Remedios Varo, Exploration of the Source of the Orinoco River, 1959.

Women surrealists are women artists, photographers, filmmakers and authors connected with the surrealist movement, which began in the early 1920s.

== Painters ==
- Gertrude Abercrombie (1909–1977), Chicago artist inspired by the surrealists, who became prominent in the 1930s and 1940s. She was also involved with the jazz music scene and was friends with musicians such as Dizzy Gillespie, Charlie Parker, and Sarah Vaughan.
- Marion Adnams (1898–1995), English painter, printmaker, and draughtswoman, notable for her surrealist paintings.
- Eileen Forrester Agar (1899–1991), born in Argentina and moved to Britain in childhood. She was prominent among British surrealists; Agar made intricate collages and paintings of abstract organic shapes.
- Rachel Baes (1912–1983), Belgian painter, who from 1929 onwards was a member of the surrealist group around René Magritte.
- Fanny Brennan (1921–2001), painter; grew up in the world of art spending time with Gerald and Sara Murphy and Pablo Picasso. She was featured in two shows in 1941 in the Wakefield Bookshop gallery. As well as she had three solo exhibits in 1973 and a book published of her work in 1990.
- Emmy Bridgwater (1906–1999), English artist and poet associated with the surrealist movement.
- Leonora Carrington (1917–2011), British-born Mexican surrealist painter. She met the surrealist Max Ernst in 1937, and had a painful and complicated relationship with him. Much of her work is autobiographical.
- Ithell Colquhoun (1906–1988), British surrealist painter and author.
- Leonor Fini (1907–1996), born in Buenos Aires and raised in Trieste, met the surrealists in 1936 but never officially joined. She paints startling images, often with sphinxes or apparitions.
- Jane Graverol (1905–1985), Belgian surrealist painter.
- Valentine Hugo (1887–1968), illustrator and married to Jean Hugo, she participated in the surrealist movement between 1930 and 1936.
- Frida Kahlo (1907–1954), Mexican painter claimed by Breton as surrealist, though Kahlo herself rejected the label.
- Rita Kernn-Larsen (1904–1998), Danish painter.
- Greta Knutson (1899–1983), Swedish artist and writer who pursued surrealism while married to Tristan Tzara in the 1930s.
- Jacqueline Lamba (1910–1993), French painter, married (1934–1943) to André Breton.
- Maruja Mallo (1902–1995), Galician Spanish avant-garde artist whose painting in the 1930s was influenced by surrealism.
- Margaret Modlin (1927–1998), American surrealist painter, sculptor and photographer who spent most of her adult life in Spain.
- Grace Pailthorpe (1883–1971), British surrealist painter, surgeon, and psychology researcher.
- Alice Rahon (1904–1987), French/Mexican poet and artist. Her work contributed to the beginning of Abstract Expressionism in Mexico.
- Edith Rimmington (1902–1986), British artist and photographer
- Penelope Rosemont (born 1942), writer and painter joined the surrealist group in Paris, 1965 and met Andre Breton. In Chicago she and her friends organized an active surrealist group linked with the Breton group. Her painting was shown in the 1986 Venice Biennale.
- Kay Sage (1898–1963), began painting surrealist landscapes in the late 1930s, met and married fellow surrealist Yves Tanguy in 1940.
- Ángeles Santos Torroella (1911–2013), Catalan-Spanish painter with an interesting surrealist early stage.
- Eva Švankmajerová (1940–2005), Czech painter, ceramicist and writer. She collaborated with her husband Jan Švankmajer on films such as Alice, Faust and Conspirators of Pleasure.
- Dorothea Tanning (1910–2012), American painter, sculptor, printmaker, writer, and poet, whose early work was influenced by surrealism. She became part of the circle of surrealists in New York in the 1940s, and was married to fellow surrealist Max Ernst for 30 years.
- Bridget Bate Tichenor (1917–1990), born in Paris and of British descent, she later embraced Mexico as her home. Surrealist painter of fantastic art in the school of magic realism and a fashion editor.
- Toyen (1902–1980), Czech painter, draftsperson and illustrator and a member of the surrealist movement.
- Remedios Varo (1908–1963), Catalan-Spanish surrealist painter who moved to Mexico, she was known for her dreamlike paintings of scientific apparatus. She was married to the surrealist poet Benjamin Peret.

== Sculptors ==
- Maria Martins (1894–1973), Brazilian visual artist known as “the sculptor of the tropics”.
- Elisa Breton (1906–2000), Chilean-born French artist and writer. The third wife of André Breton, she made surrealist boxes.
- Sonia Mossé (1917–1943), French actor and illustrator. In 1938 she took part in the Exposition Internationale du Surréalisme in Paris, where she designed one of the surrealist mannequins.
- Méret Oppenheim (1913–1985), German-Swiss sculptor and photographer, also famous as one of Man Ray's models. Her most famous sculpture is Object (Breakfast in Fur), a teacup, saucer and spoon completely encased in soft brown fur.
- Mimi Parent (1924–2005), Canadian artist described by Breton as one of the "vital forces" of surrealism. Her 'picture objects' were hybrids between painting and sculpture.
- Alina Szapocznikow (1926–1973), Polish sculptor and Holocaust survivor, who spent time in Paris in the late 1940s and was exposed to the work of Jean Arp and Alberto Giacometti, among other artists connected to surrealism. Her sculptures evidenced an interest in the surrealist distortion of the human body.

== Photographers ==
- Claude Cahun (1894–1954), born Lucy Renee Mathilde Schwob, French photographer and writer, associated with the surrealist movement.
- Nusch Éluard (1906–1946), French photographer, performer and model.
- Henriette Grindat (1923–1986), one of the few Swiss women to develop an interest in artistic photography, associating with André Breton and later collaborating with Albert Camus.
- Kati Horna (1912–2000), born Kati Deutsch, Hungarian-born Mexican photojournalist, surrealist photographer and teacher.
- Ida Kar (1908–1974), Russian-born photographer who lived and worked in Paris, Cairo and London.
- Dora Maar (1907–1997), Croatian-born French photographer who had a nine-year relationship with Pablo Picasso.
- Emila Medková (1928–1985), Czech photographer who began producing surrealistic works in 1947, above all remarkable documentary images of the urban environment.
- Lee Miller (1907–1977), American photographer, photojournalist and model.
- Marcel Moore (1892–1972), born Suzanne Alberte Malherbe, French illustrator, designer, writer and photographer.
- Francesca Woodman (1958–1981), American photographer who explored the relationship between the body and its surroundings.
- Toshiko Okanoue (born 1928), Japanese surrealist known for her photo collages.

== Filmmakers ==
- Germaine Dulac (1882–1942), French filmmaker, who directed The Seashell and the Clergyman in 1928.
- Nelly Kaplan (1931–2020), Argentine-born French "neo-surrealist" filmmaker and writer.

== Writers ==
- Aase Berg (born 1967), Swedish poet and critic, among the founding members of the Stockholm Surrealist Group in 1986.
- Suzanne Césaire (1915–1966), Martinican writer, teacher, and anti-colonialist. She co-founded and edited the cultural journal Tropiques.
- Lise Deharme (1898–1980), French writer associated with the surrealist movement.
- Irène Hamoir (1906–1994), Belgian novelist and poet.
- Joyce Mansour (1928–1986), Egyptian-French poet. She first encountered surrealism in Cairo, but moved to Paris in 1953.
- Olga Orozco (1920–1999), Argentine poet of the surrealistic 'Tercera Vanguardia' generation.
- Alejandra Pizarnik (1936–1972), Argentine poet heavily influenced by surrealism.
- Valentine Penrose (1898–1978), French surrealist poet, author and collagist.
- Gisèle Prassinos (1920–2015), French writer of Greek heritage, associated with surrealism since her first publication at the age of 14.
- Guia Risari (born 1971), Italian writer, novelist, essayist, translator.
- Penelope Rosemont (born 1942), American writer, painter, photographer, collagist and cofounder of the Chicago Surrealist Group. Her edited anthology Surrealist Women demonstrated the breadth of women's contribution to surrealism.
- Ginka Steinwachs (born 1942), German scholar and writer. Her doctoral thesis on André Breton was published as Mythologie des Surrealismus.
- Blanca Varela (1926–2009), Peruvian poet. Octavio Paz characterized her poetry as in the "spiritual lineage" of surrealism.
- Haifa Zangana (born 1950), Iraqi writer active in surrealist activity in London.
- Unica Zürn (1916–1970), German writer and artist. She wrote anagram poetry, exhibited automatic drawing and collaborated with Hans Bellmer as his photographic model.

== Others ==
- Sheila Legge (1911–1949), surrealist performance artist, best known for her 1936 Trafalgar Square performance for the opening of London International Surrealist Exhibition, posing in an ensemble inspired by a Salvador Dalí painting, with her head completely obscured by a flower arrangement.
- Mary Stanley Low (1912–2007) - British-Cuban political activist, Trotskyist, surrealist poet, artist and teacher.
- Elsa Schiaparelli (1890–1973), Italian fashion designer, a colleague of, friend of, and collaborator with Salvador Dalí and Leonor Fini, among others.

== See also ==
- Surrealism
- Women artists
- Women in photography
- List of 20th century women artists
- Whitney Chadwick

== Bibliography ==
- Allmer, Patricia (ed.) (2009) Angels of Anarchy: Women Artists and Surrealism, London and Manchester: Prestel and Manchester Art Gallery.
- Allmer, Patricia (ed.) (2016) Intersections: Women Artists/Surrealism/Modernism, Manchester: Manchester University Press.
- Allmer, Patricia (2016) "Revising the Canon: Feminist Interventions", in Blackwell Companion to Dada and Surrealism, ed. David Hopkins, London: Blackwell.
- Rosemont, Penelope, edited and introduced. (1998) Surrealist Women: An International Anthology, Austin: University of Texas Press.
