= Ted Joans =

American jazz poet, musician and surrealist ( 1928–2003)

- Born: Theodore Jones, Jr. July 4, 1928; Cairo, Illinois, U.S.
- Died: April 25, 2003 (aged 74); Vancouver, British Columbia, Canada
- Education: Indiana University
- Occupations: Jazz poet; surrealist; trumpeter; painter
- Known for: Bohemianism
- Notable work: Long Distance Exquisite Corpse (1976-2003)
- Awards: American Book Awards Lifetime Achievement Award (2001)Before Columbus Foundation

Theodore Joans (July 4, 1928 – April 25, 2003) was an American beatnik, surrealist, painter, filmmaker, collageist, jazz poet and jazz trumpeter who spent long periods of time in Paris while also traveling through Africa. His complex body of work stands at the intersection of several avant-garde artistic streams. He was the author of more than 30 books of poetry, prose, and collage; among them Black Pow-Wow, Beat Funky Jazz Poems, Afrodisia, Jazz is Our Religion, Double Trouble, WOW and Teducation. In 2001 he was the recipient of Before Columbus Foundation's American Book Awards Lifetime Achievement Award.

In visual art, Joans is best known for creating a more than 30-foot-long chain of drawings and collages on dot matrix printer computer paper called Long Distance Exquisite Corpse (1976–2003), an extended exquisite corpse of 132 invited contributors, including Paul Bowles, Breyten Breytenbach, William S. Burroughs, Mário Cesariny, Barbara Chase-Riboud, Bruce Conner, Laura Corsiglia, Bill Dixon, Allen Ginsberg, David Hammons, Stanley William Hayter, Dick Higgins, Konrad Klapheck, Alison Knowles, Michel Leiris, Malangatana, Roberto Matta, Octavio Paz, Larry Rivers, James Rosenquist, Wole Soyinka, Dorothea Tanning and Cecil Taylor.

Joans's motto was: "Jazz is my religion and Surrealism my point of view".

== Biography ==
Joans was born in Cairo, Illinois, as Theodore Jones. His parents worked on the riverboats that plied the Ohio River and the Mississippi River. He played the trumpet and was an avid jazz aficionado, following Bop as it developed, and continued to espouse jazz of all styles and eras throughout his life. Growing up in Fort Wayne, Indiana, and Louisville, Kentucky, he earned a degree in fine arts from Indiana University where he encountered and translated Andre Breton’s 1924 Surrealist Manifesto by using a French dictionary before moving in 1951 to New York City, changing his surname from Jones to Joans and entering the bohemian artistic scene. Joans became friends with Beat Generation writer Jack Kerouac and, for a while, was a roommate with the jazz musician Charlie Parker. During that time Joans painted in a rather Abstract Expressionist style he called Jazz Action Painting and he wrote and read his poetry, developing a personal style of oral delivery he called Jazz Poetry. He became a participant in the Beat Generation scene in Greenwich Village and was a contemporary and friend of Kerouac, Allen Ginsberg, Leroi Jones (later known as Amiri Baraka), Gregory Corso, Diane Di Prima, Bob Kaufman, and Lawrence Ferlinghetti, among many others. Joans' bohemian costume balls and rent parties became rather well known, as they were photographed by Fred McDarrah and Weegee.

Choosing to lead an increasingly expatriate artist's life, Joans became involved in the intelligentsia around the Surrealism art movement after meeting Joseph Cornell and later becoming close to his childhood painter-hero Salvador Dalí in Paris before breaking with him. Joans had moved to Paris in the 1960s and was welcomed into the Surrealist circle of André Breton and by James Baldwin. He learned the French language and frequented the café Les Deux Magots in Saint Germain des Prés where he received mail and other messages. He remained mostly in Paris until the mid-1990s, spending his summers in Europe and winters in Timbuktu in Mali. Joans also became active in African studies and traveled extensively throughout the African continent, frequently on foot, over many decades between periods of living in Europe and North America. As publisher John Calder noted, "Joans adapted himself to the lifestyles of artists in Harlem and Greenwich Village, the London of the 1950s and 60s, the Paris of the 60s to the 90s, as well as to those of other European cities and Timbuktu, where he spent many winters." From the 1960s onward, Joans had a house in Tangier, Morocco, and then in Timbuktu. While he ceased playing the trumpet, he maintained a jazz sensibility in the reading of his poems and frequently collaborated with musicians. He continued to travel and maintained an active correspondence with a host of creative individuals, among them Langston Hughes, Michel Leiris, Aimé Césaire, Robert Creeley, Jake Lamar, James Baldwin, Jayne Cortez, Stokely Carmichael, Ishmael Reed, Paul Bowles, Franklin and Penelope Rosemont. Many letters between Joans and these and others are collected at the Bancroft Library of the University of California Berkeley, while the University of Delaware houses his correspondence with Charles Henri Ford. Joans was also a close correspondent/participant of the Chicago Surrealist Group.

Joans' painting Bird Lives hangs in the De Young Museum in San Francisco. He was also the originator of the Bird Lives urban legend and graffiti street art in and about New York City after the death of Charlie Parker in 1955. In his essay "Sounding Across the City: Ted Joans's 'Bird Lives!' as Jazz Performance", the cultural and literary studies scholar Amor Kohli has argued that this graffiti reflects Joans' expression of a jazz aesthetic.

Joans visual art work spans Max Ernst-like collages, assemblage, paintings and drawings; including many resulting from the collaborative surrealist game of Cadavre Exquis. The rhinoceros is a frequent subject in his work. He also created short Super 8 films.

He solicited a letter of support and a donation from the Parisian group for the Huey Newton Defense Fund in 1968.

Joans often satirized American middle-class values in poems such as Playmates. A strong and cruel humorous streak is apparent in his work when depicting the white bourgeoisie and their philistine attitudes, particularly around racial prejudice. His poems and art often explored social/racial issues from the perspective of his experiences of a black minority member within a white majority society. During the early 1980s, he was a writer in residence in Berlin under the auspices of the DAAD (Deutsche Akademische Austauschdienst) program. He also was a contributor of jazz essays and reviews to magazines such as Coda and Jazz Magazine. His autobiographical text Je Me Vois appeared in the Contemporary Authors Autobiographical Series, Volume 25, published by Gale Research.

His work has been included in numerous anthologies, including The Poetry of the Negro, 1746–1970 (1970), edited by Langston Hughes and Arna Bontemps (1970), A Broadside Treasury, edited by Gwendolyn Brooks (1971), and For Malcolm, edited by Dudley Randall and Margaret Taylor Goss Burroughs (1973). More recent publications on Joans include the anthology Teducation and Our Thang, a collection of his poems and paintings by his friend Laura Corsiglia.

In the late 1990s Joans relocated from Europe to Seattle before moving to Vancouver, British Columbia, between travels, until his death. Joans died in Vancouver, due to complications from diabetes. He fathered 10 children: Daline Jones-Weber of San Leandro (named after Salvador Dalí), Ted Jones of Santa Monica, Teresa Jordan of Whittier, JeanneMarie Jones of Rialto, Robert Jones of Long Beach, Lars Jones of Oslo, Norway, Thor Jones of Oslo, Norway, Russell Jones of Scotland, Sylvia Jones and Yvette Jones-Johnson.

== Published works ==
- Funky Jazz Poems (1959), New York: Rhino Review.
- Beat Poems (1959), New York: Deretchink.
- All of Ted Joans and No More (1961), with collages by the author, New York: Excelsior Press.
- The Truth (1960)
- The Hipsters with collages by the author (1961), New York: Corinth.
- A Black Pow-Wow Of Jazz Poems (1969), London: Marion Boyars Publishers Ltd.
- Black Pow-Wow Jazz Poems (1969), New York: Hill and Wang.
- Afrodisia (1970), with collages by the author, London: Marion Boyars Publishers Ltd.
- Afrodisia; New Poems (1970), New York: Hill and Wang.
- A Black Manifesto in Jazz Poetry and Prose (1971), London: Calder and Boyars.
- Cogollo Caniculaire (1977), with artist Heriberto Cogollo and poet Joyce Mansour, Rome (Italy): Carlo Bestetti.
- Flying Piranha (1978), with poet Joyce Mansour, New York: Bola Press.
- Der Erdferkelforscher / The Aardvark Watcher (1980), translated by Richard Anders, Berlin: LCB-Editionen.
- Vergriffen: oder Blitzlieb Poems (1979), Kassel (Germany): Loose Blätter Press.
- Mehr Blitzliebe Poems (1982), Hamburg (Germany): Michael Kellner Verlag.
- Merveilleux Coup de Foudre (1982) with poet Jayne Cortez, in French, translated by Ms. Ila Errus and M. Sila Errus, Paris: Handshake Editions.
- Sure, Really I Is (1982), with collages by the author, Sidmouth (UK): Transformaction.
- Dies und Das: Ein Magazin von actuellem surrealistischen interesse (1984), Berlin.
- Double Trouble (1991), with poet Hart Leroy Bibbs, Paris: Revue Noire, Editions Bleu Outremer.
- Honeyspoon (1993), Paris: Handshake Editions.
- Okapi Passion (1994), Oakland: Ishmael Reed Publishing Company.
- WOW (1998), with artist Laura Corsiglia, Mukilteo (Washington): Quartermoon Press.
- Teducation: Selected Poems 1949-1999 (1999), illustrations by Heriberto Cogollo, Minneapolis: Coffee House Press.
- Select one or more: Poems (2000), Berkeley: The Bancroft Library Press.
- Our Thang: Several Poems, Several Drawings (2001), with artist Laura Corsiglia, Victoria (Canada): Ekstasis Editions.
- In Thursday Sane (2001), with illustrations by the author, Davis (California): Swan Scythe Press.

== Museum art exhibitions ==
- Metropolitan Museum of Art, Surrealism Beyond Borders
- Tate Modern, Surrealism Beyond Borders
- Centre Pompidou, Surrealism
- MoMA Vital Signs, Artists and the Body
- Lenbachhaus, But live here? No thanks: Surrealism and Anti-Fascism
- Modern Art Museum of Fort Worth, Surrealism and Us: Caribbean and African Diasporic Artists since 1940
- Virginia Museum of Fine Arts, Ted Joans: Land of the Rhinoceri

== Books about Ted Joans ==
- Belletto, Steven, Black Surrealist: The Legend of Ted Joans. Bloomsbury Academic, 2025.

== Essays about Ted Joans ==
- Michel Fabre, "Ted Joans: the Surrealist Griot", in From Harlem to Paris: Black American Writers in France 1840–1980, University of Illinois, 1991.
- Robert Elliot Fox, "Ted Joans and the (b)reach of the African American literary canon", in MELUS, Vol. 29, nos 3/4 (Fall/Winter 2004), Gale Literature Resource Center.
- Amor Kohli, "Sounding Across the City: Ted Joans’s Bird Lives! as Jazz Performance", in Beat Drama: Playwrights and Performances of the "Howl" Generation. Bloomsbury Methuen Drama, 2016.
- Joanna Pawlik, "Ted Joans' surrealist history lesson", in International Journal of Francophone Studies, Vol. 14, issue 1 & 2 (2011). doi: 10.1386/ijfs.14.1&2.221_1

== Ted Joans in film ==
- Jazz and Poetry on YouTube (1964) by Louis van Gasteren, Amsterdam. Ted Joans reads with Piet Kuiters Modern Jazz Group, excerpt on YouTube.
- Pan-African Cultural Festival / Festival panafricain d'Alger (1969) by William Klein, France/Algeria. Features Ted Joans reading with Archie Shepp and Touareg musicians.
- Jazz is Our Religion on YouTube (1971), directed by John Jeremy with the photographs of Val Wilmer. Features Ted Joans' voice reading one of his signature poems, "Jazz is My Religion".
- Ted Joans and David Amram Scat on YouTube (1994) at Jack Kerouac conference, New York University.
- From St. Louis to Dogon Country (1999) part of the BBC series Great Railway Journeys. directed by David Hickman, written by Danny Glover. Features Joans and Danny Glover, Clyde Taylor and others in Mali.
- WOW! Ted Joans Lives! by Kurt Hemmer and Tom Knoff (2010). An homage to Ted Joans, featuring his reading at Harper College, Palatine, Illinois, in 2002.
