= Abigail Susik =

American art historian

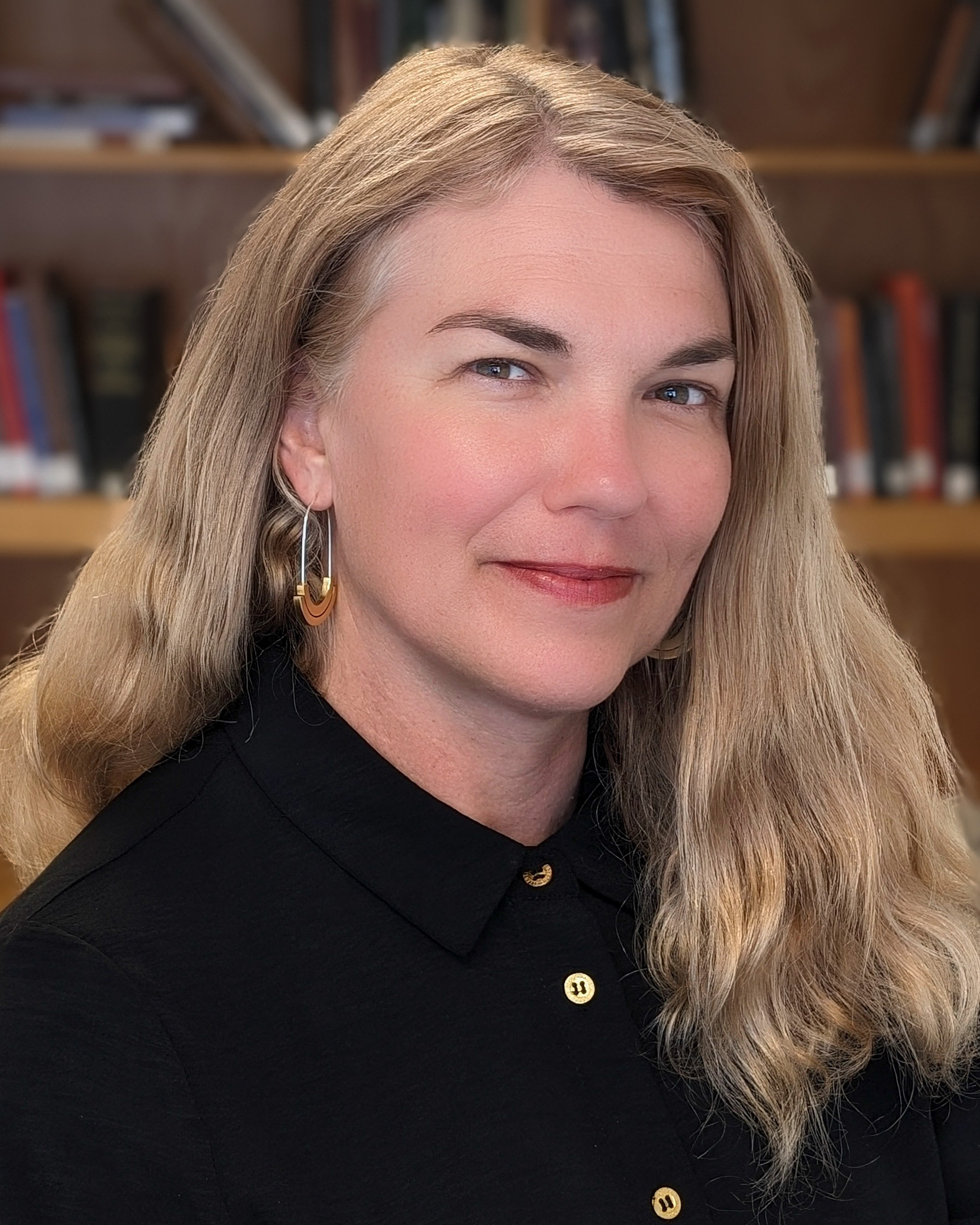
Abigail Susik, 2024

Abigail Susik (born 1977) is an American art historian, art critic, curator, and theorist of avant-garde and contemporary art. Susik's scholarly research purview includes surrealism, dada, photography, experimental film, animation, protest art, erotic art, new media art, and projection mapping. Susik primarily writes about transnational surrealism, countercultural resistance movements, and anti-work or abolitionist theories including the history and theory of strike and sabotage. She is a Joint Editor of the Bloomsbury Publishing Transnational Surrealism Book Series and a Board Member of Charles H. Kerr Publishing. Susik is best known for her book Surrealist Sabotage and the War on Work, published in 2021 by Manchester University Press, which has been reviewed by Michael Löwy, Joseph Nechvatal, Paul Buhle, and others. Her edited volumes have been reviewed in Frieze, Burlington Contemporary, Dada/Surrealism, Los Angeles Review of Books, and other publications.

== Education ==
After graduating with a B.A. in English, Art History, and Creative Writing from Barnard College in 1999, Susik studied in the Department of History of Art and Architecture at Columbia University, receiving her M.A. in 2001, her M.Phil. in 2004, and her Ph.D. in 2009. During her graduate degrees, she studied with Rosalind Krauss, Benjamin Buchloh, Anne Higonnet, Jonathan Crary, John Rajchman, and Andreas Huyssen.

== Career ==
Susik is Associate Professor and Department Chair of Art History at Willamette University, as well as a faculty advisor for the Master of Arts Critical Studies Program at the Pacific Northwest College of Art. She is a founding Board Member of the International Society for the Study of Surrealism and an Associate Editor of its publication, International Journal of Surrealism. Between 2015 and 2019 she was a Member of the New Media Caucus Board of Directors and an Associate Editor of its publication, Media-N, Journal of the New Media Caucus.

From 2009-2011 Susik was a postdoctoral teaching fellow in Art History at Millsaps College. In 2022-2023 Susik was a City of Vienna/IFK Senior Fellow at the IFK International Research Center for Cultural Studies in Vienna, and in 2023-2024 she was the Allen W. Clowes Fellow at the National Humanities Center. She is a spring 2025 Senior Fellow at the Institute for Advanced Study at Central European University in Budapest.

Susik curated an exhibition devoted to the modernist nude photography of Imogen Cunningham at the Hallie Ford Museum of Art in 2016. In Autumn 2024, her co-curated retrospective of the surrealist artist Alan Glass opened at the Museo del Palacio de Bellas Artes in Mexico City. This major exhibition will travel to the Montreal Museum of Fine Arts in April (April 17-Steptember 28, 2025).

=== Research interests ===
Susik's research focuses on modern and contemporary art and theory, the historiography of art history, Marxism, anarchism, Frankfurt School theory, Marxist feminism, social reproduction theory, labor theory of value, and the history of anti-capitalist protest movements. Her research on post-World War II radicalism in the United States resulted in published interviews and profiles on Paul Buhle, John P. Clark, Silvia Federici, Ben Morea, and Penelope Rosemont. She teaches a wide array of courses at Willamette University, including 18th through 21st century art history, a monographic course on Marcel Duchamp, methodologies of art history, Museology, History of photography, and a seminar on the critique and refusal of work.

=== Author and critic ===
Susik has published interviews, profile essays, and op-eds in the Los Angeles Review of Books, The New York Times, and The Washington Post. She is a regular contributor to radical publications such as Fifth Estate and Freedom. She authored or co-authored studies on artists and writers including Louis Aragon, Walter Benjamin, André Breton, Leonora Carrington, Óscar Domínguez, Marcel Duchamp, Isidore Ducasse, Max Ernst, Alan Glass, Eugène Grasset, Alejandro Jodorowsky, Konrad Klapheck, Michel Leiris, D. E. May, Man Ray, Hans Richter, Franklin Rosemont, Penelope Rosemont, Françoise Sullivan, Cy Twombly, and Jules Verne. Susik's book Surrealist Sabotage and the War on Work was published in 2021 by Manchester University Press. In Surrealist Sabotage, Susik analyzes the critique of wage labor and the exploration of sabotage theories in European and American surrealism between the 1920s and the 1970s.

== Monographs ==
- Surrealist Sabotage and the War on Work (Author). Manchester University Press, 2021. ISBN 9781526155016.
- Exorcising the Patriarchy: Leonora Carrington's Plays and Scenography, Penelope and Opus Siniestrus: The Story of the Last Egg (Author). Eberhardt Press, 2026. ISBN 9798902719380.

== Edited Collections ==
- Absolutely Modern Mysteries: Surrealism and Film After 1945 (Editor, with Kristoffer Noheden). Manchester University Press, 2021. ISBN 9781526149985.
- Radical Dreams: Surrealism, Counterculture, Resistance (Editor, with Elliott H. King). Penn State University Press, 2022. ISBN 978-0-271-09145-7.
- Resurgence! Jonathan Leake, Radical Surrealism, and the Resurgence Youth Movement 1964-67 (Editor). Eberhardt Press, 2023. ISBN 978-0-9778392-5-4.
- Surrealism, Bugs Bunny, and the Blues: Selected Writings on Popular Culture, by Franklin Rosemont (Editor, with Paul Buhle). PM Press, 2025. ISBN 9798887440866.
- Enquiry on Magic Art by André Breton, Volume III of the Special Edition (Editor, with Robert Ansell, Tessel Bauduin). Fulgur Press, 2025. ISBN 978-1399971188.
- Surrealism and Animation: Transnational Connections, 1920-Present (Editor). Bloomsbury Publishing, 2025. ISBN 9781350475939.
- Surrealism and Anti-Authoritarianism After 1945 (Editor). De Gruyter Brill, 2026. ISBN 978-90-04-73725-9.
