= Lise Deharme =

French writer (1898–1980)

- Born: 1898; Paris
- Died: 1980 (aged 81–82)
- Occupation: French writer
- Writing career
- Literary movement: Surrealism

Lise Deharme (née Anne-Marie Hirtz; 5 May 1898 – 19 January 1980) was a French writer associated with the Surrealist movement.

== Biography ==
Deharme was born in Paris in 1898. Her father was a famous doctor. In January 1925, she visited the Paris Bureau of Surrealist Research. As a result of an incident that occurred during her visit, which is recorded in André Breton's Nadja, she would become known as the "dame au gant," or the Lady of the Glove.

In 1927 she married Paul Deharme, the radio pioneer who worked with surrealist Robert Desnos. Using the pen name Lisa Hirtz, she published her first book: Il était une petite pie [There was a little magpie] (with 8 pochoirs by Joan Miró) in 1928.

Until recently, the legacy of Lise Deharme has been told in the margins of books on Surrealism and Surrealism's father, André Breton. She is remembered as the "first impossible mad love dreamed of by André Breton". However, her social and political influence on Surrealism extends far beyond the novel, and beyond her influence as Breton's "notorious muse".

In recent years, historians such as Marie-Claire Barnet, Mary Ann Caws, Renée Riese Hubert, Andréa Oberhuber, and Penelope Rosemont, have begun to un-do the "reducing" of Deharme to "a failed love story". These scholars have set out to establish a more dynamic conception of Deharme's reputation.

In her lifetime, she gained "celebrity as a hostess". Specifically, she was a prolific organizer of Surrealist salons. Man Ray once described Deharme's house, where she held her salons, as "a rambling affair, filled with strange objects and rococo furniture". Amidst these rambling salons, Deharme's subversive publication, Le Phare de Neuilly, emerged in 1933. Le Phare de Neuilly provided space for radical juxtapositions of works by contributors such as "Natalie Barney, James Joyce, D.H. Lawrence, and Jacques Lacan" and was poignantly political and subversive. As the curator of Le Phare, Deharme personally "[blended] ethical and aesthetic issues to address the socio-political troubles of the early 1930s".

In the late 1930s, Deharme collaborated with Claude Cahun on the book Le Cœur de Pic. After publishing Le Cœur de Pic in 1937 Deharme, alternatively, came to be known in the Surrealist circle as "la Dame de Pique" [the Queen of Spades]. Around this time she was closely connected to André Breton, Paul Eluard, and Man Ray. She is featured posing in one of Man Ray's photographs as the Queen of Spades.

Marie Clare Barnet describes the significance of Deharme's new nickname:

Le choix du symbole maléfique de la Dame de Pique nous suggère donc qu'on aurait tort de reléguer ses ouvres dans la rubrique "charme fragile" de la "féminité féline et végétale". Méfiance, le charme de l'humour deharmien est plus vénéneux qu'on a pu le laisser entendre, même dans le meilleurs ouvrages de références.

[The choice of the malevolent symbol of the Queen of Spades suggests that we would be wrong to relegate her work to the "fragile charm" category of "feline and floral femininity". Beware: the charm of Deharmian humor is more poisonous than we have been led to believe, even in the best reference books].

== Written works ==
- Il etait une Petite Pie – with illustrations by Joan Miró (1928)
- Cahier de Curieuse Personne (1933)
- Le Coeur de Pic – with photographs by Claude Cahun (1937) – republished by éditions MeMo (2004)
- Cette Année-La – with preface by Paul Éluard (Gallimard, 1945)
- Insolence (Fontaine, 1946)
- Le Pot de Mousse (Fontaine, 1946)
- Eve la Blonde (Gallimard NRF, 1952)
- La porte d'à Côté (Gallimard NRF, 1949)
- Le Poids d'un Oiseau – with illustrations by Léonor Fini (Terrain Vague, 1955)
- Farouche à Quatre Feuilles – with André Breton, Julien Gracq and Jean Tardieu (Grasset, 1954)
- Le Château de l'Horloge (Julliard, 1955)
- Les quatre cents Coups du Diable (Deux-Rives, 1956)
- Et la Bête (Grasset, 1957)
- La Contesse Soir (1957)
- Le Tablier Blanc – with engraving by Joan Miró (1958)
- Laissez-moi Tranquille (Julliard, 1959)
- Les Années Perdues, Journal, 1939–1949 (1961)
- Carole ou ce qui plait aux Filles (Julliard, 1961)
- Pierre de la Mermorte (Julliard, 1962)
- L'Enchanteur (Grasset, 1964)
- L'Amant Blessé (Grasset, 1966)
- Oh! Violette ou la Politesse des Végétaux – with illustrations by Léonor Fini (Losfeld, 1969)
- Valentina (1970)
- Le Téléphone est Mort (Losfeld, 1973)
- La Marquise d'Enfer (1977)
- La Caverne (1984)

== Bibliography ==
- Surrealist Women: An International Anthology (1998) by Penelope Rosemont, pages 69–70
- To Lise Deharme's Lighthouse: Le Phare de Neuilly, A Forgotten Surrealist Review by Marie-Claire Barnet, University of Durham
- Caws, Mary Ann. Glorious Eccentrics. 1st ed. New York: Palgrave Macmillan, 2006. Print.
- Chadwick, Whitney, ed. Mirror Images: Women, Surrealism, and Self-Representation. Cambridge: The MIT Press, 1998. Print.
- Deharme, Lise. Le Cœur de Pic . Illus. Claude Cahun. 2nd ed. Rennes: Éditions MeMo, 2004. Print.
- Malt, Johanna. "Recycling, Contamination and Compulsion: Practices of the Objet Surréaliste." Surrealism: Crossings/Frontiers. Ed. Elza Adamowicz. 18 Vol. Switzerland: Peter Lang, 2006. 109–131. Print. European Connections.
- Oberhuber, Andrea. "Claude Cahun, Marcel Moore, Lise Deharme and the Surrealist Book." History of Photography 31.1 (2007): 40. Print.
- Oberhuber, Andrea. "The Surrealist Book as a Cross-Border Space: The Experimentation of Lise Deharme and Gisèle Prassinos." Image & Narrative 12.13 (2011): 81. Print.
- Rosemont, Penelope. Surrealist Women. Austin: The University of Texas Press, 1998. Print.
