= Penelope Rosemont =

American artist (born 1942)

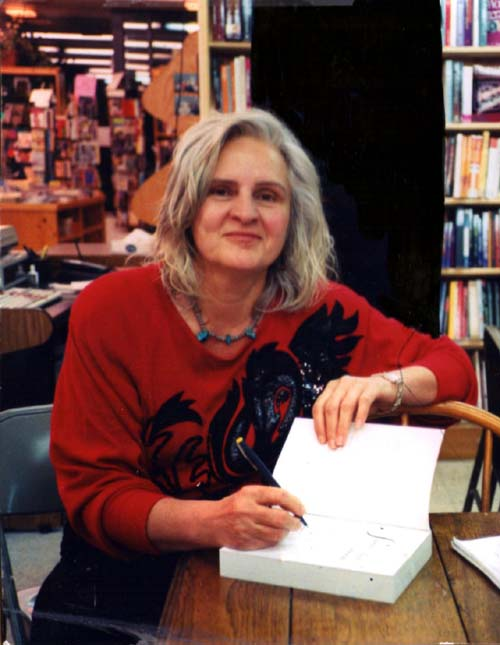
- Penelope Rosemont signing at Chicago's Women and Children First, 2007.

Penelope Rosemont (born 1942 in Chicago, Illinois) is a visual artist, writer, publisher, and social activist who attended Lake Forest College. She has been a participant in the Surrealist Movement since 1965. With Franklin Rosemont, Bernard Marszalek, Robert Green and Tor Faegre, she established the Chicago Surrealist Group in 1966. She was in 1964-1966 a member of the Industrial Workers of the World (IWW), commonly known as the Wobblies, and was part of the national staff of Students for a Democratic Society (SDS) in 1967-68. Her influences include Andre Breton and Guy Debord of the Situationist International, Emma Goldman and Lucy Parsons.

== Visual art ==
In 1986, Penelope Rosemont's painting the "Marriage of Heaven and Hell" was included in the Venice Biennale, selected by Arturo Schwartz to be in the Art and Alchemy section. A painter, photographer, and collagist, Rosemont is credited with having invented a number of surrealist collage methods including the "landscapade" and "insect music" [in which cut-out shapes are placed on the background of a musical score]. Rosemont is a writer and graphic designer for Arsenal/Surrealist Subversion and other publications. Her painting The Night Time is the Right Time "was selected by the Chicago Jazz Institute for the 2000 Chicago Jazz Festival T-shirt". A number of Rosemont's drawings and artwork appear in her books and are particularly abundant in Surrealist Experiences: 1001 Dawns, 221 Midnights.

== Surrealism in and outside of Chicago ==
The Rosemonts write with enthusiasm about their meeting with Andre Breton and Surrealist group members during a stay in Paris, France, in December 1965–May 1966. Penelope writes about this important period in her life in the books Surrealist Experiences: 1001 Dawns, 221 Midnights and in her autobiographical work Dreams and Everyday Life: Andre Breton, Surrealism, Rebel Worker, SDS, & the Seven Cities of Cibola, A 1960s Notebook, while Franklin discusses it in his book, An Open Entrance into the Shut Palace of Wrong Numbers. In the Surrealist Experiences, Penelope Rosemont writes about a nascent group of Surrealists that had already formed in Chicago, the Rebel Worker group, before they met Breton and, in fact, this was the impetus to go to Paris, to meet the Surrealists they had been corresponding with. She writes that the initial plan was to go to London, England, first and then to Paris; however, as she says, "thanks to a mean-spirited British immigration bureaucrat", they were deported to Paris. That event was fortuitous because the surrealist exhibition L'Ecart absolu was taking place at the time; she attended a New Years Eve party organized by surrealists;and she was able to talk with Breton before he "became seriously ill a few months later".

The Rosemonts are referenced in Helena Lewis's 1988 book on Surrealism and Politics, Dada Turns Red.. There, Lewis wrote:

"There was also a group of young people in Chicago in the late 1960s who made a connection between Surrealism and the old IWW, The Rebel Worker in which translations of Surrealist writing appeared . . . and they also published an art anthology of Surrealist political texts, in which the editor, Franklin Rosemont, explained how Surrealism was relevant to his movement."

In his book Freedom Dreams, published in Boston, 2002, Robin D. G. Kelley writes: “my search for an even more elaborate, complete dream of freedom...thanks to the many wonderful chance encounters with Franklin Rosemont, Penelope Rosemont, Ted Joans, Laura Corsiglia and Jayne Cortez, I discovered surrealism...right under my nose, so to speak, buried in the rich black soil of Afrodiasporic culture.” p. 4.

The Chicago Surrealist group, under their imprint Black Swan Press, published the journal Arsenal/Surrealist Subversion' sporadically from 1970 to 1989' which featured the work of Richard Huelsenbeck, Andre Breton, Georges Bataille, Ted Joans Jayne Cortez and many other Surrealists, well-known and lesser known. Franklin and Penelope Rosemont were on the editorial board, along with (for issue 4), co-editors Paul Garon, Joseph Jablonski and Philip Lamantia.

== Books: poetry, memoirs, and history ==
Penelope Rosemont is the editor and wrote extensive introductions for her book Surrealist Women: An International Anthology (University of Texas, 1998), a book of over 500 pages of writing and art by women in the Surrealist movement, both past and present, dating back to the beginnings of Surrealism in the 1920s. It features Meret Oppenheim, Mary Low, Leonora Carrington, Nancy Cunard, Frida Kahlo, Dorothea Tanning, Elisa Breton, Kay Sage, Jayne Cortez, Rikki Ducornet and over one hundred more.

She is the author of Surrealist Experiences: 1001 Dawns, 221 Midnights (Black Swan Press, 2000), and books of poetry, including Beware of the Ice, and Athanor (1971).

In 1997, Black Swan Press released the book The Forecast is Hot!, and Other Collective Declarations of the Surrealist Movement in the United States, which Penelope co-authored with Franklin Rosemont and fellow Chicago Surrealist Paul Garon.

She also edited The Story of Mary MacLane & Other Writings by Mary MacLane, which was re-released by Charles H. Kerr in 1998, having originally been published in 1902. MacLane has been "hailed as the first 'New Woman' in literature, the first flapper and a precursor of surrealism."

In 2008, her memoir came out, Dreams & Everyday Life, André Breton, Surrealism, Rebel Worker, SDS & the Seven Cities of Cibola, about her life in the 1960s from moving to Chicago to meeting Andre Breton in Paris, to London and back again to Chicago in 1968.

A collection of true Chicago stories, Armitage Avenue Transcendentalists, edited by Rosemont and Janina Ciezadlo, came out in 2009. Rosemont also wrote a foreword to Crime & Criminals: Address to the Prisoners in the Cook County Jail & Other Writings on Crime by Clarence Darrow.

In 2018, Make Love, Not War: Surrealism 1968!, co-authored with Don LaCoss and Michael Lowy, was published by Charles H. Kerr Publishing, Chicago.

Surrealism: Inside the Magnetic Fields, which recounts her experiences and historical perspective on the field of surrealism, was published by City Lights in 2019.

== Women and surrealism ==
In addition to editing the anthology Surrealist Women, Rosemont has written extensively about women, including Toyen, specifically, as well as many Surrealist women, who are often omitted from the history of Surrealism, in her book Surrealist Experiences

She has also been outspoken in public discussions and articles in the promotion and defense of the women of Surrealism. By her presence in the American Surrealist movement, her activism, and her publishing, she has been one of the people who have raised the profile of women in the movement.

== Charles H. Kerr Publishing ==
In 1983, she and Franklin Rosemont became directors of Charles H. Kerr & Company, a publisher of books on history and Chicago history

The Alternatives in Publication Task Force of the Social Responsibilities Round Table of the American Library Association awards the Jackie Eubanks Memorial Award, which "recognizes outstanding achievement in promoting the acquisition and use of alternative materials in libraries.". In 2001, the Rosemonts and Carlos Cortez received the award for their work "rescuing and re-charging" Charles H. Kerr Publishing."

== Social activism ==
Penelope Rosemont was a member of the IWW (Wobblies) and SDS in the 1960s. With Franklin Rosemont she compiled a collection of pamphlets, wall posters, and periodicals focusing on the IWW acquired by the Newberry Library in 2008 Her book Armitage Avenue Transcendentalists details stories in the lives of a number of activists, including famous Chicagoan Studs Terkel.

In 1977, continuing the Surrealist tradition of protesting bourgeois art, Penelope Rosemont and other surrealists were arrested for handing out leaflets as part of a Surrealist action protesting the "giant billy club" called the "bat column" on which Chicago spent $100,000 to erect the Claes Oldenburg Batcolumn.
