= Le Déjeuner en fourrure =

Sculpture by Méret Oppenheim

Object (Le Déjeuner en fourrure)
- Artist: Méret Oppenheim
- Year: 1936
- Catalogue: 80997
- Type: Assemblage sculpture
- Location: Museum of Modern Art; New York City
- Owner: Museum of Modern Art
- Accession: 130.1946.a-c

Object (Le Déjeuner en fourrure), lit. Object ("The Luncheon in Fur"), known in English as Fur Breakfast or Breakfast in Fur, is a 1936 sculpture by the surrealist Méret Oppenheim, consisting of a fur-covered teacup, saucer and spoon.

The work, which originated in a conversation in a Paris cafe, is the most frequently-cited example of sculpture in the surrealist movement. It is also noteworthy as a work with challenging themes of femininity.

== History ==
The work's concept originated in a conversation among Oppenheim, Pablo Picasso, and his lover and fellow artist Dora Maar at a Parisian café where the café's social role was discussed, and at which Oppenheim was wearing a fur-covered brass tube bracelet, the pattern of which she sold to the fashion designer Elsa Schiaparelli. Picasso had suggested that anything could be covered in fur, and Oppenheim remarked that this would apply to "even this cup and saucer". Oppenheim was nearly 23 years old at the time. In a slightly more explicit version of the conversation, Picasso compliments the young artist on her fur bracelet, and flirtatiously observes that there are many things he enjoys that were improved when covered in fur. Oppenheim responded, tongue in cheek, by asking, "Even this cup and saucer?"

Oppenheim created and exhibited the work as part of André Breton's first exhibition of surrealist sculpture (Exposition surréaliste d'objets), held at the Galerie Charles Ratton. She originally titled it prosaically as "Cup, saucer and spoon covered with fur", but the work was renamed by Breton in reference to Manet's painting Le Déjeuner sur l'herbe. The work accords well with Breton's theories in his essay "The Crisis of the Object".

In true found object mode, the teacup, saucer and spoon are ordinary objects purchased from Monoprix, a Paris department store. The fur covering is that of a Chinese gazelle.

Later in 1936, the work appeared at the London International Surrealist Exhibition, where it was noticed by Alfred H. Barr, Jr. Barr then displayed the work as part of the "Fantastic Art, Dada, Surrealism" exhibition of winter 1936/1937 at the Museum of Modern Art in New York City, whose visitors selected it as "the quintessential Surrealist object." Barr afterwards purchased it for the museum, where it remains in the permanent collection. The enormous success of this early work would create later problems for Oppenheim as an artist, and soon after its creation she drifted away from the Surrealists. Decades later, in 1972, she artistically commented on its dominance of her career by producing a number of "souvenirs" of Le Déjeuner en fourrure.

== Interpretation ==
One of the women Surrealists, Oppenheim in this work combines the domesticity of the tea set (part of the traditionally feminine decorative arts) with the eroticism and animality of the fur covering.

As in other surrealist works, a visual pun is implied, and the incongruity and impracticability of the combined elements is also highlighted.

Will Gompertz, a former director at Tate Modern, writes of the sculpture:

The sexual connotations of Object (Le Déjeuner en Fourrure) are obvious: drinking from the furry cup is an explicit sexual reference. But there is much more to it than a saucy joke. The image of a fur-lined cup and spoon would not be out of place in the first chapter of any book about anxiety nightmares, in which any pretense of being in control is subverted by sinister happenings. In this instance, a cup and spoon has grown hair, turning objects from which one should derive relaxation and pleasure into something aggressive, unpleasant and faintly disgusting. It has connotations of bourgeoise guilt: for wasting time gossiping in cafés and mistreating beautiful animals (the fur is from a Chinese gazelle). It is also an object designed to engender madness. Two incompatible materials have been brought together to create one troubling vessel. Fur is pleasing to touch, but horrible when you put it in your mouth. You want to drink from the cup and eat from the spoon—that is their purpose—but the sensation of the fur is too repulsive. It’s a maddening cycle.
