= Paul Garon =

American writer (1942–2022)

- Born: July 6, 1942; Louisville, Kentucky, U.S.
- Died: July 26, 2022 (aged 80)
- Occupation: Writer

Paul Arthur Garon (July 6, 1942 – July 26, 2022) was an American author, writer, and editor, noted for his meditations on surrealist works, and also a noted scholar on blues as a musical and cultural movement.

Born in Louisville, Kentucky, the son of a doctor and a sociology graduate, Garon settled in Chicago and was one of the founders of the Chicago Surrealist Group in the mid-1960s.

Garon was one of the founding editors of Living Blues magazine in 1970. He once wrote that "blues represents a fusion of music and poetry accomplished at a very high emotional temperature". Amongst his other publications, Garon was the biographer of Peetie Wheatstraw. Later, Garon and his wife Beth operated Beasley Books together, a rare book business in Chicago. He was also a founding partner of the Chicago Rare Book Center, in Evanston, Illinois.

Garon died on July 26, 2022, at the age of 80.

== Works ==
- What's the Use of Walking if There's A Freight Train Going Your Way? Black Hoboes and Their Songs. with Gene Tomko, 2015. ISBN 978-0882863719
- Woman With Guitar: Memphis Minnie's Blues, with Beth Garon, 1992. ISBN 978-0306804601
- Blues and the Poetic Spirit, 2001. ISBN 978-0872863156
- The Forecast Is Hot: Tracts & Other Collective Declarations of the Surrealist Movement in the United States 1966–1976, with Franklin Rosemont and Penelope Rosemont, 1997. ISBN 978-0941194297
- The Devil's Son-In-Law: The Story of Peetie Wheatstraw and His Songs, 2003. ISBN 978-0882862668
- Rana Mozelle: Surrealist Texts, 1978. ISBN 978-0941194051
- The Charles H. Kerr Company Archives 1885–1985: A Century of Socialist and Labor Publishing, 1985. ISBN 978-0882861449
- "White Blues," Race Traitor 4 (1995)
