= Jacques Vaché =

French poet (1895–1919)

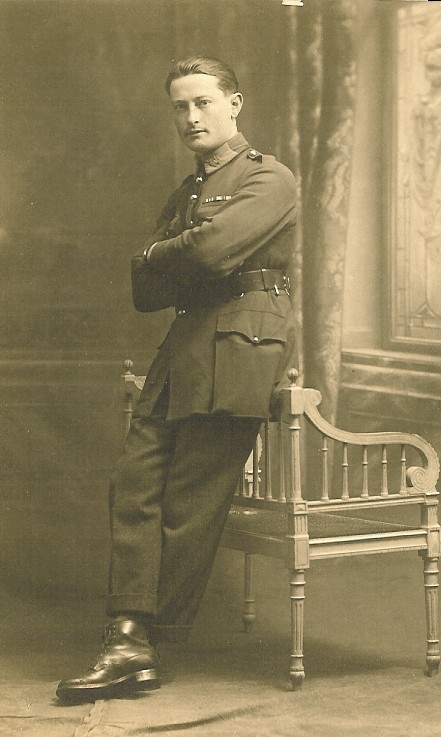
Jacques Vaché

Jacques Vaché (7 September 1895 – 6 January 1919) was a friend of André Breton, the founder of surrealism. Vaché was one of the chief inspirations behind the Surrealist movement. As Breton said:

"En littérature, je me suis successivement épris de Rimbaud, de Jarry, d'Apollinaire, de Nouveau, de Lautréamont, mais c'est à Jacques Vaché que je dois le plus"

("In literature, I was successively taken with Rimbaud, with Jarry, with Apollinaire, with Nouveau, with Lautréamont, but it is Jacques Vaché to whom I owe the most")

He was born on 7 September 1895 in Lorient, France, and died in a hotel room in Nantes on 6 January 1919 from an overdose of opium. Alongside him lay the naked body of another French soldier. André Breton believed his death to be a suicide. He was known for his indifference and for wearing a monocle.
