= Guia Risari =

Italian writer, educator and translator (born 1971)

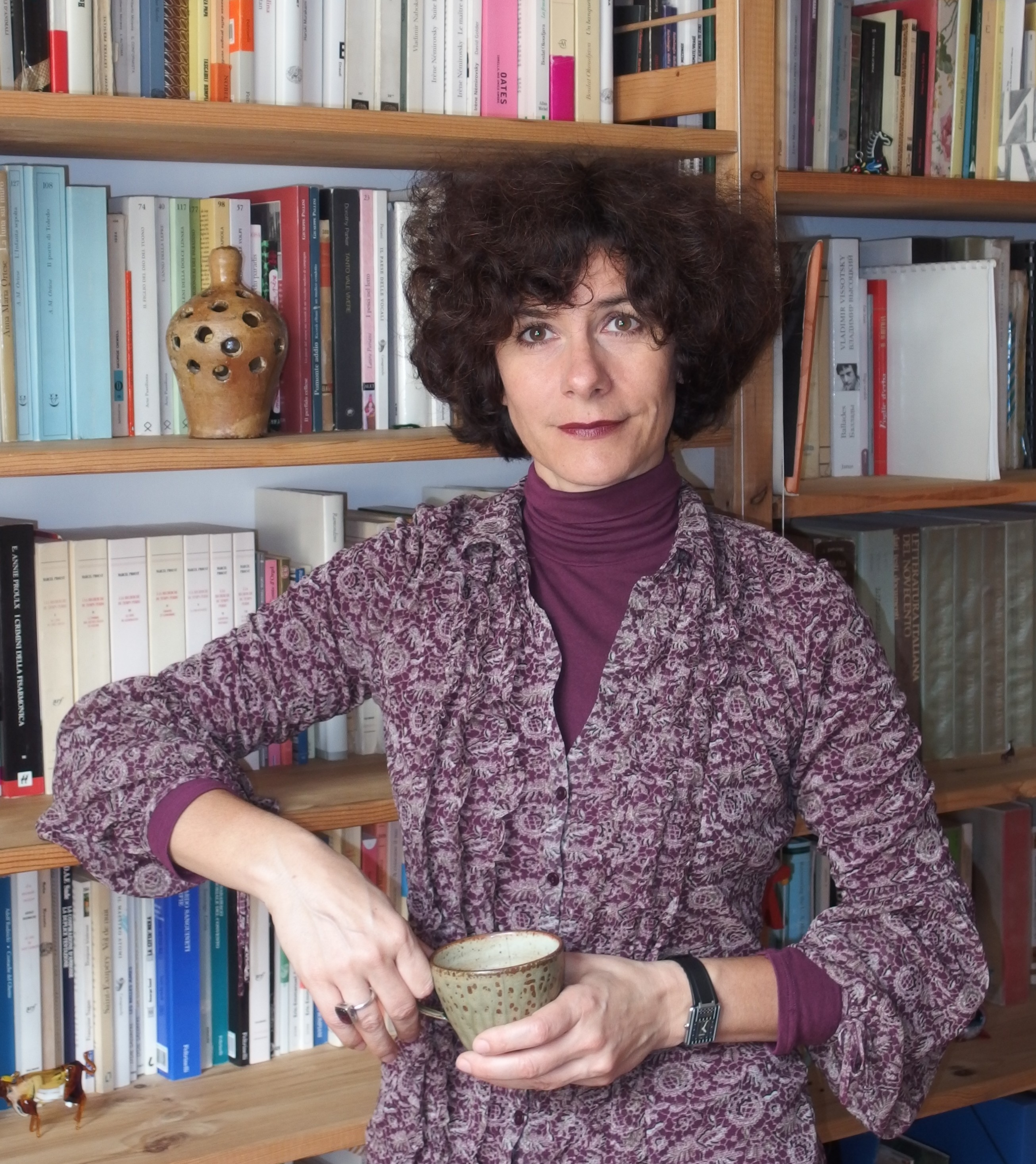
- Guia Risari
- Born: August 14, 1971 (age 55); Milan
- Citizenship: Italian
- Education: Academic degree
- Alma mater: University of Milan
- Occupations: novelist, essayist, translator
- Writing career
- Language: Italian, English, French, Spanish
- Website: guiarisari.com

Guia Risari (14 August 1971) is an Italian writer, educator and translator.

== Biography ==
Born in Milan, Guia Risari graduated from the Liceo Parini in 1990. She went on to study Ethics at university, getting her degree in 1995 with a thesis on Jean Améry, at the same time working as a journalist for l'Unità and as an educationalist; she also took part as a volunteer in the humanitarian mission at the refugee camp of Klana.

Risari then took up an in-depth study of antisemitism, getting a master's degree in "Modern Jewish Studies" in 1997 from the University of Leeds. Beginning in 1998, she spent a long period in France to continue her studies in Montpellier, Toulouse and Paris. Between 1999 and 2008 she divided her time between the Sorbonne and Sapienza University of Rome. In the same period, she worked as a librarian, teacher, translator, journalist, writer and lecturer, while never abandoning her work as a volunteer.

Guia Risari is often the translator of her own works, which are published in various languages. Her studies, along with Surrealism, a sensitivity towards minorities and her regard for children are all re-elaborated in her writing, to which she has devoted herself since 2001.

== Literary works ==
With the exception of her translations and essays, Guia Risari’s writings are usually accompanied by illustrations created by different artists: for example, the colors of Elisa Macellari for Il decamerino or Cecco Mariniello for Pane e oro and La macchina di Celestino, the collages of Marc Taeger for Achille il puntino, or the pencil drawings of Arianna Floris for La porta di Anna.

Il pesce spada e la serratura is illustrated by Altan and recalls the Surrealistic game of exquisite corpses.

Il taccuino di Simone Weil is accompanied by the illustrations of Pia Valentinis. The novel tells the true story of Simone Weil and the historical scenario in which she lived, in the form of an imaginary diary. Published in an artisan printing house, and furnished with a bookmark, the volume is presented in the style of a real diary: the pages are "in natural paper made of cotton fibres” and the binding is held together with elastic.

La terre respire, with watercolors by Alessandro Sanna, represents "a hymn to the power of nature"; Le chat âme, illustrated by Ghislaine Herbéra, narrates the story of a cat, regarded as an “animal-guide, a sort of ancestral double”; Le Petit Chaperon bleu, with pictures by Clémence Pollet, is a "Surreal version of Little Red Riding Hood".

The interaction between writing and graphics and the supervision of the edition, typical of book arts, are also the very characteristics of Surrealism, especially feminine surrealism. Similarly, elements common to literary works of feminine Surrealism are the artists’ book, interdisciplinary features, the use of fairy-tales populated by magical creatures and cats regarded as alter egos, the attention given to nature and recourse to the imagination and writing in order to combat negativity and racial prejudice.

=== Children's books and novels ===
In general, Guia Risari’s writings for children are part of the new Italian literary model of the 21st century, through which children are urged into active and critical reading, encouraged to re-elaborate reality in a creative way. The child protagonist in Pane e oro, for example, manages to overcome her humble conditions with her imagination, with only the help of a piece of paper and a pencil.

Achille il puntino, also published in Spain and included in a catalogue entitled Born to Read, provides young readers with tools for discovering new worlds through speaking, literature and writing. The dot, in fact, contains in itself a multitude of meanings and images which come to life and change. Through successive metamorphoses, the dot makes it possible to visualize anthropomorphic forms and stimulates children to question the human body, an object of curiosity and mystery.

The “salvific power of imagination” resists even the most tragic reality, like that of Anne Frank, which Guia Risari revisits in La porta di Anna, in which the persecution of the Jews is narrated so as to remain impressed in the memory of all readers. It is a creative transposition made up of many elements from her studies in anti-Semitism, which previously bore fruit in her essay-writing.

Il viaggio di Lea was Finalist in the "Premio Strega Ragazze e Ragazzi" 2016-17, Category +11.

=== Studies in anti-Semitism ===
Guia Risari dealt with anti-Semitism from a philosophical point of view during her academic studies in Leeds, going on to analyze the characteristics of Italian anti-Semitism through the work of Giorgio Bassani. Risari makes reference, above all, to the critical approach of the Frankfurt School and the analyses carried out by Zygmunt Bauman on the relationship between modernity and the Holocaust, on the basis of which the characteristics of recent times (order, homogeneity and function) have aggravated the ancient prejudice against the Jews, always regarded as the “other”, “different”, to be isolated and destroyed. For the first time, the bureaucratic machine takes on that task, relieving the individual of responsibility.

Approaching Il romanzo di Ferrara by Bassani, Guia Risari also takes into consideration the literary testimony of the Holocaust. The literature of the Holocaust, through various phases from diaries to essays, poetry and stories, is transformed into an instrument of commemoration, interpretation and elaboration of the events and traumas. In Romanzo di Ferrara, Risari recognizes the complexity of a work that is “at the same time an historical narrative and a personal document”, in which Bassani is both a “reporter and witness, describing with increasing awareness the scene of a personal and collective trauma”, yet maintaining a calm tone. The emphasis of Bassani, in fact, is on the need to preserve the memory of an event, the Holocaust, which has stained a part of humanity, and not on the commiseration of the victims nor the cruelty of the tormentors: in other words, what counts is the right to exist of every living being.

In The document within the walls, written in English, Guia Risari probes Bassani’s narrative with accuracy, even verifying the number of those who died on the Lapide di via Mazzini, and utilizing an interpretive model that puts to good use the means of both literary and social criticism. The aim of her research is to examine anti-Semitism in Italy during the Fascist period as it is described in Romanzo di Ferrara, which should be regarded as “not a simple collection of stories but rather a true document” about Jewish integration and Italian betrayal, about the Fascist persecution and the painful disillusion of the victims. The writer expresses doubts about the “myth of good Italians” that is based on the fact that the Italian persecution of Jews was less ferocious than that of the Nazis.

In Jean Améry. Il risentimento come morale, a work derived from her graduate thesis and for which Guia Risari won five awards, the writer suggests a re-evaluation of the idea of resentment, which she considers “the only way to moralize life and history”. The resentment of the survivors of the concentration camps is indicated as the only way to emend history, without forgetting or pardoning it, and is reassessed in the wake of Adorno and Horkheimer; i.e. it is freed from being a pathological or unsound reaction. Améry makes public his resentment with no false modesty: “the fundamental insight of Améry consists precisely in having understood the complex ambivalence of resentment, which is the refusal of the present and, at the same time, an emotional and existential bond with the past”, a "multiform revolt of the soul, which makes it possible to save and revive the memory of the offence without obscuring the use of critical reason".

The necessity of not forgetting is taken up again in the introductory essay by Guia Risari for the Italian edition of Le sang du ciel by Piotr Rawicz (translated by the same Risari), which reintroduces the double role of the writer as witness and narrator of the Holocaust, reasserting the importance of giving voice to the pain caused by others for no reason so that it will not be forgotten.

== Bibliography ==
Essays

- The document within the walls: the romance of Bassani 2nd ed., Market Harborough, Troubador, 2004 [1999], ISBN 1-899293-66-3
- Jean Améry: il risentimento come morale, Milano, Franco Angeli, 2002, ISBN 88-464-3402-1
- Un ciel de sang et de cendres: Piotr Rawicz et la solitude du témoin, Paris, Editions Kimé, 2013, pp. 131–135, ISBN 978-2-84174-609-5
- Jean Améry: il risentimento come morale, 2nd ed., Roma, Castelvecchi, 2016, ISBN 978-88-6944-607-8
- Il diario di Anna Frank, Milano, Mondadori, 2019, ISBN 9788804718659

Novels

- Il taccuino di Simone Weil, illustrated by P. Valentinis, Palermo, RueBallu, 2014, ISBN 978-88-95689-15-9
- Il decamerino, illustrated by E. Macellari, Milano, Oscar Mondadori, 2015, ISBN 978-88-04-65563-3
- La porta di Anna, illustrated by A. Floris, Milano, Mondadori, 2016, ISBN 978-88-04-65888-7
- Il viaggio di Lea, illustrated by I. Bruno, San Dorligo della Valle, EL Einaudi Ragazzi, 2016, ISBN 978-88-6656-330-3
- Gli amici del fiume, illustrated by G. Rossi, Milano, San Paolo Ragazzi, 2017, ISBN 978-88-215-9972-9
- Così chiamò l'Eterno, Viterbo, Stampa Alternativa, 2018, ISBN 9788862226349
- Il filo della speranza, Cagli, Edizioni Settenove, 2021, ISBN 9788890860584
- I giorni di Alban, illustrated by F. Gambatesa, Firenze, Giunti Editore, 2023, ISBN 978-88-099-438-10
- Notizie dalla fattoria Sottolmo, illustrated by A. Oberosler, Savignano sul Rubicone, Sabir, 2025, ISBN 9788831460828

Short Stories

- Digestione, 2001
- Il segreto di Miguel la Lune, 2001
- Nuit Palestinienne, 2002
- Maemi, 2003
- Diario di Milaidis de los Angeles Casanova Carmina, 2003
- Le ore di Busan, 2003
- Les départs, 2004
- Dudé, 2005
- L'editto, 2006
- Pecore in Terra Santa, 2008
- In quella strada, 2009
- La moglie di Barbablù, 2010
- Quarto di luna, 2011
- Loris, 2012
- Il Soffio Millenario, 2012
- Colasabbia, 2012
- Le disavventure di Casanova, 2013
- In quella strada, 2013
- Chiave di Pioggia, 2014
- I pescatori, 2015
- Il poeta, 2015
- L'angelo dell'amore, 2015
- I giorni della prigione, 2016

Poems

- Quattro Stagioni, 2002
- J'ai vu, 2003
- Le Maître, 2015

Plays

- La Pietra e il Bambino; La Pierre et l'Enfant, Teatro Gioco Vita 2013
- I canti dell'albero, Controluce 2019

Surrealistic works

- L' alfabeto dimezzato, illustrated by Chiara Carrer, Roma, Beisler, 2007, ISBN 978-88-7459-013-1
- Il pesce spada e la serratura, illustrated by Francesco Tullio Altan, Roma, Beisler, 2007, ISBN 978-88-7459-012-4

Children's books

- Pane e oro, illustrated by Cecco Mariniello, Modena, F. Panini Ragazzi, 2004, ISBN 88-8290-647-7
- La macchina di Celestino, illustrated by Cecco Mariniello, Roma, Lapis, 2006, ISBN 88-7874-014-4
- Aquiles el puntito, illustrated by Marc Taeger, Pontevedra, Kalandraka, 2006, ISBN 84-96388-35-2
- Aquilles el puntet, translated by Joao Barahona, Pontevedra-Barcellona, Kalandraka-Hipòtesi, 2006, ISBN 84-934380-0-6
- Aquiles o puntiño, translated by Xosé Ballesteros, Pontevedra, Kalandraka, 2006, ISBN 84-8464-568-1
- Achille il puntino, illustrated by Marc Taeger, Firenze, Kalandraka, 2008, ISBN 978-88-95933-03-0
- Aquiles o pontinho, translated by Elisabete Ramos, Lisboa, Kalandraka Portugal, 2008, ISBN 978-972-8781-84-2
- Il cavaliere che pestò la coda al drago, illustrated by Ilaria Urbinati, Torino, EDT-Giralangolo, 2008, ISBN 978-88-6040-348-3
- La terre respire, illustrated by Alessandro Sanna, Nantes, MeMo, 2008, ISBN 978-2-35289-036-2
- Le chat âme, illustrated by Ghislaine Herbéra, Nantes, Editions MeMo, 2010, ISBN 978-2-35289-094-2
- La coda canterina, illustrated by Violeta Lopiz, Milano, Topipittori, 2010, ISBN 978-88-89210-48-2
- Gli occhiali fantastici, illustrated by Simone Rea, Modena, Franco Cosimo Panini, 2010, ISBN 978-88-570-0176-0
- Le Petit Chaperon bleu, illustrated by Clémence Pollet, Paris, Le Baron Perché, 2012, ISBN 978-2-36080-054-4
- Caperucita azul, illustrated by Clémence Pollet, S.A de C.V., Ediciones Castillo, 2013, ISBN 978-607-463-930-8
- El regalo de la giganta, illustrated by Beatriz Martin Terceño, Barcelona, A Buen Paso, 2013, ISBN 978-84-941579-0-5
- Je m'appelle Nako, illustrated by Magali Dulain, Paris, Le Baron Perché, 2014, ISBN 978-2-36080-099-5
- Il regalo della gigantessa, Trapani, Buk Buk, 2015, ISBN 978-88-98065-10-3
- O presente da giganta, Barueri, MOV Palavras, 2015, ISBN 978-85-68590-21-8
- El vuelo de la familia Knitter, illustrated by Anna Castagnoli, Barcelona, A Buen Paso, 2016, ISBN 978-84-944076-9-7
- Il volo della famiglia Knitter, illustrated by Anna Castagnoli, Trieste, Bohem Press, 2016, ISBN 978-88-95818-72-6
- Se fossi un uccellino, illustrated by Simona Mulazzani, Loreto (AN), Eli-La Spiga edizioni, 2016, ISBN 978-88-468-3564-2
- Il pigiama verde, illustrated by Andrea Alemanno, Belvedere Marittimo (CS), Coccole Books, 2016, ISBN 978-88-98346-62-2
- I tre porcellini d'India, illustrated by Valeria Valenza, Loreto (AN), Eli-La Spiga edizioni, 2017, ISBN 978-88-468-3639-7
- La tigre di Anatolio, illustrated by Giulia Rossi, Roma, Beisler, 2018, ISBN 978-88-7459-057-5
- Elia il camminatore, illustrated by Giulia Rossi, Cinisello Balsamo (MI), San Paolo, 2018, ISBN 978-88-92214-10-1
- La stella che non brilla, illustrated by Gioia Marchegiani, Verona, Gribaudo Editore, 2019, ISBN 978-88-58023228
- Una gallina nello zaino, illustrated by Anna Laura Cantone, Milano, Terre di Mezzo, 2019, ISBN 978-8861895218
- Ada al contrario, illustrated by Francesca Bonanno, Cagli, Edizioni Settenove, 2019, ISBN 978-8898947423
- Mamma cerca casa, illustrated by Massimiliano Di Lauro, Milano, Paoline, 2019, ISBN 9788831551380
- Mi chiamo Nako, illustrated by Paolo D'Altan, Milano, Paoline, 2020, ISBN 978-8831551878
- Molto molto orso, illustrated by Laura Orsolini, Trieste, Bohem Press, 2020, ISBN 978-88-32137-11-8
- Avanti tutta!, illustrated by Daniela Iride Murgia, Perugia, Edizioni Corsare, 2020, ISBN 9788899136598
- Le più belle storie della tradizione ebraica, illustrated by Cinzia Ghigliano, Verona, Edizioni Gribaudo, 2021, ISBN 9788858029435
- La terra respira, illustrated by Alessandro Sanna, Roma, Edizioni Lapis, 2021, ISBN 9788878748156
- Le più belle fiabe regionali italiane, illustrated by Fabiana Bocchi, Verona, Edizioni Gribaudo, 2021, ISBN 9788858038956
- Baci, illustrated by Andrea Calisi, Perugia, Edizioni Corsare, 2021, ISBN 9788899136697
- Non siamo angeli, illustrated by Alicia Baladan, Cagli, Edizioni Settenove, 2022, ISBN 9788898947744
- Voglio il mio mostro, illustrated by Ceylan Aran, Roma, Edizioni Lapis, 2022, ISBN 9788878748774
- In quel baule, illustrated by Laura Orsolini, Trieste, Edizioni Bohem Press Italia, 2022, ISBN 9788832137224
- Non temere, illustrated by Daniela Tieni, Roma, Edizioni Lapis, 2023, ISBN 9788878749160
- Lupo di farina, illustrated by Alice Coppini, Roma, Edizioni Lapis, 2023, ISBN 9788878748866
- Una gallina in cattive acque, illustrated by Anna Laura Cantone, Milano, Edizioni Terre di Mezzo, 2023, ISBN 979-12-5996-151-8
- Viaggio di un bacio, illustrated by Elena Baboni, Roma, Edizioni Lapis, 2023, ISBN 9788878749498
- Splendide creature, illustrated by Cinzia Ghigliano, Cagli, Edizioni Settenove, 2024, ISBN 9791281477049
- Mirabasso e Altamira, illustrated by Sergio Olivotti, Roma, Edizioni Lapis, 2024, ISBN 9791255190189
- Il gatto anima, illustrated by Ghislaine Herbéra, Calco, Edizioni Piuma, 2025, ISBN 9788897443766
- Sentiers, illustrated by Andrea Calisi, Paris, Ed. Cambourakis, 20245, ISBN 9782366249903
- Haiku per esplorare il mondo, illustrated by Maki Hasegawa, Firenze, Edizioni Giunti, 2025, ISBN 9791223200605
- Il tram numero fiore, illustrated by Federico Delicado, Firenze, Kalandraka, 2025, ISBN 9788413433462
- I musicisti di Brera, illustrated by Vittoria Zorzi, Firenze, Edizioni Giunti, 2025, ISBN 9791223200926
- Grande come, illustrated by Giulia Pastorino, Roma, Edizioni Lapis, 2025, ISBN 9791255190738
- Uno come, illustrated by Giulia Pastorino, Roma, Edizioni Lapis, 2025, ISBN 9791255190721
- Dopo l'ultima città, illustrated by Paolo Domeniconi, Calco, Edizioni Piuma, 2025, ISBN 9788897443841
- Sentieri, illustrated by Andrea Calisi, Padova, Kite Edizioni, 2025, ISBN 9788867452484
- Nonso, illustrated by Andrea Oberosler, Savignano sul Rubicone, Sabir Editore, 2025, ISBN 9788831460910
- Che cos'è il cielo?, illustrated by Marianna Balducci, photos by Fabio Gervasoni, Monselice, Camelozampa, 2026, ISBN 9791254642481
- La festa più bella, illustrated by Richolly Rosazza, Padova, Kite, 2026, ISBN 9788867452545
- La piuma rossa, illustrated by Federica Vissio, Milano, Gribaudo, 2026, ISBN 9788858053799
- Azzurro come, illustrated by Giulia Pastorino, Roma, Lapis, 2026, ISBN 9791255191056
- Fischio come, illustrated by Giulia Pastorino, Roma, Lapis, 2026, ISBN 9791255191063
- Un giorno di blu, illustrated by Alice Bonora, Macerata, Rrose Sélavy, 2026, ISBN 9788885534308
- Il dittatore, illustrated by Federico Appel, Cagli, Settenove, 2026, ISBN 9791281477292
- E se crescendo, illustrated by Andrea Calisi, Roma, Lapis, 2026, ISBN 9791255191087

Translations

- Anne-Sophie Brasme, La mia migliore amica, translation by Guia Risari, Feltrinelli, 2002, ISBN 88-07-70142-1
- Tierno Monénembo, Il grande orfano, translation by Guia Risari, Milano, Feltrinelli, 2003, ISBN 88-07-01629-X
- Maryse Condé, La vita perfida, translation by Guia Risari, Roma, Edizioni e/o, 2004, ISBN 88-7641-593-9
- Marie Sellier, L'Africa, piccolo Chaka..., illustrated by Marion Lesage, translation by Guia Risari, Genova, L'Ippocampo, 2005, ISBN 88-88585-73-7
- Piotr Rawicz, Il sangue del cielo, introductory essay and translation by Guia Risari, Firenze, Giuntina, 2006, ISBN 88-8057-252-0
- Jill Murphy, Cinque minuti di pace, translation by Guia Risari, Torino, EDT-Giralangolo, 2006, ISBN 88-6040-237-9
- Jill Murphy, Una serata colorata, translation by Guia Risari, Torino, EDT-Giralangolo, 2006, ISBN 978-88-6040-357-5
- Jill Murphy, La signora Enorme dorme, translation by Guia Risari, Torino, EDT-Giralangolo, 2006, ISBN 88-6040-263-8
- Jill Murphy, Solo una fetta di torta, translation by Guia Risari, Torino, EDT-Giralangolo, 2006, ISBN 978-88-6040-356-8
- Nadia Roman, Il Risveglio, translation by Guia Risari, Torino, EDT-Giralangolo, 2006, ISBN 88-6040-235-2
- Laurence Cleyet-Merle, Il grande volo di Odilio, translation by Guia Risari, Torino, EDT-Giralangolo, 2006, ISBN 88-6040-234-4
- Sylvette Hachemi, Afganistan, translation by Guia Risari, Torino, EDT-Giralangolo, 2006, ISBN 978-88-6040-214-1.
- Aude Le Morzadec, Cile, translation by Guia Risari, Torino, EDT-Giralangolo, 2006, ISBN 978-88-6040-230-1
- Barbara Martinez, Cina, translation by Guia Risari, Torino, EDT-Giralangolo, 2006, ISBN 978-88-6040-213-4
- Séverine Bourguignon, Dedi e il riso di Giava, translation by Guia Risari, Torino, EDT-Giralangolo, 2006, ISBN 978-88-6040-225-7
- Mohamed Ad-Daïbouni, Fatna e la bianca Tetouan, translation by Guia Risari, Torino, EDT-Giralangolo, 2006, ISBN 978-88-6040-227-1
- Marc-Henry Debidour, Giappone, translation by Guia Risari, Torino, EDT-Giralangolo, 2006, ISBN 978-88-6040-229-5
- Sylvette Bareau, Crescence Bouvarel, Camille Pilet, India, translation by Guia Risari, Torino, EDT-Giralangolo, 2006, ISBN 978-88-6040-350-6
- Etienne Appert, Ravi e i pescatori di Goa, translation by Guia Risari, Torino, EDT-Giralangolo, 2006, ISBN 978-88-6040-228-8
- Françoise Guyon, Roger Orengo, Thi Thêm e la fabbrica di giocattoli, adaptation and translation by Guia Risari, Torino, EDT-Giralangolo, 2006, ISBN 978-88-6040-351-3
- Séverine Bourguignon, Il Tukul di Yussuf, translation by Guia Risari, Torino, EDT-Giralangolo, 2006, ISBN 2-84166-265-9
- Jacquie Wines, Il pianeta lo salvo io...in 101 mosse!, adaptation and translation by Guia Risari, Torino, EDT-Giralangolo, 2007, ISBN 88-6040-252-2
- Jean de La Fontaine, Favole di La Fontaine, illustrated by Thierry Dedieu, new translation by Guia Risari, vol. 2, Milano, L'Ippocampo, 2007, ISBN 88-95363-95-7
- Jean de La Fontaine, Favole di La Fontaine, illustrated by Thierry Dedieu, new translation by Guia Risari, vol. 1, Milano, L'Ippocampo, 2007, ISBN 88-95363-94-9
- Anne-Sophie Brasme, La mia migliore amica, new translation by Guia Risari, Milano, Kowalski, 2008, ISBN 2-213-61030-4
- David Benedictus, Ritorno al bosco dei cento acri, translation by Guia Risari, Milano, Nord-Sud, 2009, ISBN 978-88-8203-941-7
- Michael Hoeye, Il tempo delle rose, translation by Guia Risari, Milano, Salani, 2009, ISBN 978-88-8451-978-8
- Jakob Grimm, Wilhelm Grimm, Biancaneve, translation by Guia Risari, Milano, Nord-Sud, 2009, ISBN 978-88-8203-923-3
- Dav Pilkey, I coniglietti tontoloni, translation by Guia Risari, Milano, Nord-Sud, 2009, ISBN 978-88-8203-897-7
- Dav Pilkey, Largo ai coniglietti tontoloni, translation by Guia Risari, Milano, Nord-Sud, 2009, ISBN 978-88-8203-898-4
- Jan Fearnley, Marta sta nel mezzo, translation by Guia Risari, Milano, Nord-Sud, 2009, ISBN 978-88-8203-924-0
- Sylvain Trudel, Le chiavi della notte, translation by Guia Risari, Padova, ALET, 2010, ISBN 978-88-7520-157-9
- Robert Marich, Non solo baci. I più grandi film d'amore, translation by Guia Risari, Vercelli, White Star, 2010, ISBN 88-540-1528-8
- Tonino Benacquista, Gli uomini del giovedì, translation by Guia Risari, Roma, e/o, 2012, ISBN 978-88-6632-112-5
- David Almond, Il bambino che si arrampicò fino alla luna, translation by Guia Risari, Milano, Salani, 2012, ISBN 978-88-6256-829-6
- Dominique Demers, Sos: nuova prof., translation by Guia Risari, San Dorligo della Valle, EL Einaudi ragazzi, 2017, ISBN 978-88-6656-375-4
- Rosie Haine, Il mio superserciziario femminista, translation by Guia Risari, Cagli, Edizioni Settenove, 2020, ISBN 9788898947416
- Emily Dickinson, Una goccia sul melo, translation by Guia Risari, San Dorligo della Valle, EL Einaudi ragazzi, 2021, ISBN 9788866566397
- Remy Charlip, Sottobraccio, translation by Guia Risari, Cervinara, Edizioni Primavera, 2021, ISBN 9788885592322
- Rosie Haine, La nudità che male fa?, translation by Guia Risari, Cagli, Edizioni Settenove, 2021, ISBN 9788898947621
- Jonah Winter, Accadde a Salem, translation by Guia Risari, Cagli, Edizioni Settenove, 2025, ISBN 9791281477087

== See also ==
- Artist's book
- Children's literature
- Women Surrealists
