= Manifestoes of Surrealism =

1969 book by André Breton

- Author: André Breton
- Original title: Manifestes du Surréalisme
- Translator: Richard Seaver, Helen R. Lane
- Publisher: University of Michigan Press
- Publication date: 1924 (original), 1969 (University of Michigan)
- ISBN: 0-472-06182-8
- OCLC: 2306469

Manifestoes of Surrealism is a book by André Breton, describing the aims, meaning, and political position of the Surrealist movement. It was published in 1969 by the University of Michigan Press.
