= Arsenal/Surrealist Subversion =

American surrealist magazine

Arsenal/Surrealist Subversion was a surrealist magazine published in Chicago and edited by Franklin Rosemont. It appeared infrequently between 1970 and 1989. Apart from Rosemont, the editor in chief, the magazine's editorial board included other members of the Chicago Surrealist group (such as Paul Garon, Joseph Jablonski, Philip Lamantia and Penelope Rosemont). The first issue of the magazine was published in October 1970. Four issues have appeared, the second in 1973, the third in 1976 and the fourth and most recent in 1989. The publisher of all four issues was Black Swan Press.

Contributors to Number 3 included Jayne Cortez and Philip Lamantia, a surrealist poet connected to the Beats. It was described as "[a] stunning, lavish, damn huge production, with essays, art, poetry and invective from just about anyone who's anyone... [a]ngry, uncompromising and provocative", with "[m]ind blowing perspectives on just about everything."

Number 4 included work by Georges Bataille, Benjamin Paul Blood, André Breton, Luis Buñuel, Leonora Carrington, Karl Marx, George Orwell, Benjamin Péret and others.

== See also ==
- Acéphale, a surrealist review created by Bataille, published from 1936 to 1939
- Minotaure, a primarily surrealist-oriented publication founded by Albert Skira, published in Paris from 1933 to 1939
- La Révolution surréaliste, a Surrealist publication founded by Breton, published in Paris from 1924 to 1929
- View, an American art magazine, primarily covering avant-garde and surrealist art, published from 1940 to 1947
- VVV, a New York magazine published by émigré European surrealists from 1942 through 1944
