= Manifesto for an Independent Revolutionary Art =

The International Federation of Independent Revolutionary Art (FIARI) was a short-lived organization established in 1938 until 1939 on the initiative of Andre Breton and Diego Rivera following the publication in Partisan Review of their Manifesto for an Independent Revolutionary Art, which was signed by both individuals, based on their political and cultural rejection of the Communist International and what they viewed as growing trends toward state and bureaucratic control over art and literature across the world. It was co-authored by Leon Trotsky.

== History ==
In April 1938, André Breton travelled to Mexico on a grant from France's Ministry of Foreign Affairs. There, he became acquainted with Leon Trotsky and co-authored the Manifesto with him. The published Manifesto was signed by Breton and Rivera.

The document called for the establishment of an International Federation of Independent Revolutionary Art. On Breton's return to France, he established the Federation, setting up branches in Paris, London and New York, as well as Mexico. Breton successfully solicited supported for the project from the likes of Benjamin Péret, Yves Tanguy, André Masson, Victor Serge, Marcel Martinet, Ignazio Silone, Herbert Read (who, in turn, won the support of George Orwell) and others.

However, the Federation was beset with problems with the European branches receiving a lack of public interest due to the preoccupation with the threat of war. Only two editions of La Clé, the monthly bulletin of the Federation's French section, were published before publication was ceased in February 1939 amid a deepening political crisis across Europe. In his last letter to Trotsky in June 1939, Breton wrote: "Perhaps I am not very talented as an organizer, but at the same time it seems to me that I have run up against enormous obstacles."
