= Alan Glass =

Canadian artist and teacher (1932–2023)

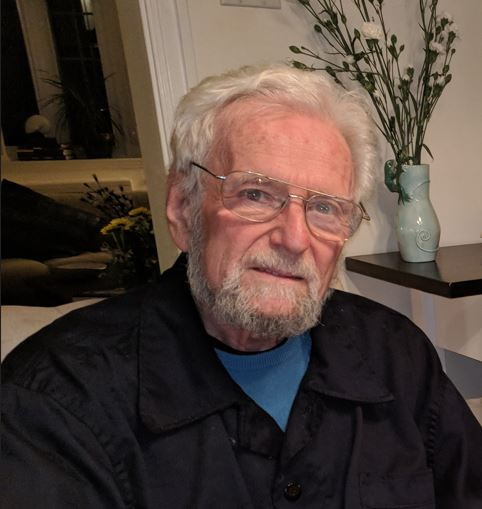
- Glass in 2018
- Born: 30 June 1932; Montreal, Quebec, Canada
- Died: 16 January 2023 (aged 90); Mexico City, Mexico
- Education: École des beaux-arts de Montréal
- Occupations: Artist; Teacher

Alan Glass (30 June 1932 – 16 January 2023) was a Canadian multidisciplinary artist and teacher.

== Biography ==
Born in Montreal on 30 June 1932, Glass studied at the École beaux-arts de Montréal from 1949 and 1952 and worked in the studio of Alfred Pellan. He received a scholarship from the French government in 1952 and lived in Paris while traveling through Central Europe and the Middle East. During this time, he exhibited at the Galerie Le Terrain Vague, where he met André Breton. From 1968 to 1969, he journeyed through India and Nepal, particularly in the state of Sikkim. In 1962, he first traveled to Mexico. In the 1970s, he began living through Mexico and Quebec.

Glass died in Mexico City on 16 January 2023, at the age of 90.

== Solo exhibitions ==
- Galerie Le Terrain vague (1958)
- Galerie du Siècle (1965)
- Galerie Antonio Souza (1972)
- Galerie de Montréal (1972)
- Musée d'art moderne de Mexico (1976)
- Galerie Gilles Corbeil (1977)
- Galeria Pecanins (1982)
- Galerie du Grand Théâtre (1985)
- Claude Bernard Gallery (1991)
- Galería López Quiroga (2003)
- Museo de Arte Moderno (2008)

== Public collections ==
- Metropolitan Museum of Art
- Musée d'Art Moderne de Paris
- Montreal Museum of Fine Arts
- Musée national des beaux-arts du Québec

== Filmography ==
- Alan Glass (2010)

== Awards ==
- A room named in his honor at the Vieux Presbytère de Saint‑Bruno-Montarville (2016)
- Medal of Fine Arts of the Secretariat of Culture of Mexico (2017)
