= Gallery Black Swan =

Surrealist gallery in Chicago, Illinois, US

Coordinates: 41°53′27.7″N 87°37′58.4″W

Gallery Black Swan, a now-defunct surrealist gallery in Chicago, was the site of the 1976 World Surrealist Exhibition. It later became the site of Michael Jordan's Restaurant.
