= Chicago Surrealist Group =

Group of artists in Illinois, US

- Formation: July 1966
- Founder: Franklin Rosemont; Penelope Rosemont; Bernard Marszalek; Tor Faegre; Robert Green
- Headquarters: Chicago, United States

The Chicago Surrealist Group was founded in Chicago, Illinois, in July 1966 by Franklin Rosemont, Penelope Rosemont, Bernard Marszalek, Tor Faegre and Robert Green after a trip to Paris in 1965, during which they were in contact with André Breton. Its initial members came from far-left or anarchist backgrounds and had already participated in groups IWW (calling themselves the Rebel Worker Group and putting out a magazine called the Rebel Worker) and SDS; indeed, the Chicago group edited an issue of Radical America, the SDS journal, and the SDS printshop printed some of the group's first publications.

== Collaborations and projects ==
The group played a major role in organizing the World Surrealist Exhibition held at Gallery Black Swan in Chicago in 1976. As the name suggests, broader in scope than previous "international" exhibitions, it featured hundreds of works almost exclusively from contemporary participants in surrealism from thirty-one countries.

Marvelous Freedom/Vigilance of Desire was the title of the catalogue of the 1976 World Surrealist Exhibition. It contains a number of texts and reproductions, as well as a blueprint of the layout of the gallery, with the location of the different "domains" into which the exhibition was organised.

The group also produced four issues of a journal, Arsenal: Surrealist Subversion, between 1970 and 1989. Participants in the group's activities have included Clarence John Laughlin, Gerome Kamrowski, Philip Lamantia, Tristan Meinecke and Franklin Rosemont. As participants past and present have been based in cities other than Chicago, the group has never been strictly defined by geography, despite its name. The group has worked with others, such as The Surrealist Group in Stockholm, with which it met in Chicago and Stockholm in 1986, publishing the International Surrealist Bulletin No. 1.

== See also ==
- The Surrealist Group in Stockholm

== Bibliography ==
- Rosemont, Franklin and Charles Radcliffe. Dancin' in the Streets: Anarchists, IWWs, Surrealists, Situationists and Provos in the 1960s as Recorded in the Pages of Rebel Worker and Heatwave, Charles H Kerr. 2005. ISBN 0-88286-301-0
- Abigail Susik, Surrealist Sabotage and the War on Work, Manchester University Press, 2021, pp. 182-237
