= Surrealist Women =

1998 book by Penelope Rosemont

Surrealist Women: An International Anthology
- Editor: Penelope Rosemont
- Language: English
- Genre: Non-fiction
- Publisher: University of Texas Press
- Publication date: 1998
- Publication place: United States

Surrealist Women: An International Anthology is an anthology edited by Penelope Rosemont. It was published by University of Texas Press in 1998.

The anthology is a chronological presentation of surrealist writing by women, including poetry, tales, theory, responses to inquiries, critiques, declarations, etc. 97 women are represented, from 30 countries in Western and Eastern Europe, including Sweden, Moravia, and Corsica; North and South America, including Argentina; the Caribbean; the Middle East (e.g. Iraq); and Australia. The editor provides an introductory essay to each of the six chronological periods into which the anthology is organised (1924-1929; 1930-1939; 1940-1945; 1946-1959; the years surrounding May '1968'; and the present), and short biographies/bibliographies about each woman. Two thirds of the works had not previously been included in an anthology, and many had not been republished since their first appearance.

Reviewers considered that the anthology "has the characteristics of a classic. .. it is a book that will be definitive and delightful for many years to come"; it "not only adds to our knowledge of specific writers, but changes our understanding of surrealist art." In her introduction, Rosemont disputes some commonly held misconceptions about surrealism, including that it was sexist and did not encourage women's participation. Instead, she presents a case that "surrealism was both accepting of and tremendously influenced by women members", and their obscurity was due to critics, not male members of the surrealist movement.

One reviewer observed that "By the penultimate chapter a lot of the names of the women are familiar; we have read their work and delighted in their growth since their first appearance in this anthology. ... As each section examines a period separately .. the same names re-occur in different groupings, different guises. ... as the names shuffle about, the events, countries, times and mediums alter; then there is achieved this dream-like quality within the infrastructure of the book. Surrealism emerges unbidden!"
