= Nadja (novel) =

1928 novel by André Breton

- Nadja, cover of the 1964 Livre de Poche edition
- Author: André Breton
- Language: French
- Genre: Surrealist narration
- Publisher: Grove Press
- Publication date: 1928
- Publication place: France
- OCLC: 23109462

Nadja (1928) is the second book published by the French surrealist André Breton. It begins with the question "Who am I?"

It is based on Breton's actual interactions with a young woman, Nadja (actually Léona Camille Ghislaine Delacourt 1902–1941), over the course of ten days, and is presumed to be a semi-autobiographical description of his relationship with a patient of Pierre Janet. The book's non-linear structure is grounded in reality by references to other Paris surrealists such as Louis Aragon and 44 photographs.

The last sentence of the book ("Beauty will be CONVULSIVE or will not be at all") provided the title for Pierre Boulez's flute concerto ...explosante-fixe....

Dating from 1960, the widely available English translation by Richard Howard is a translation of the first edition of Breton's novel, dating from 1928. Breton published a second, revised edition in 1963. A second English translation by Mark Polizzotti was published in 2025 by New York Review Books.

== Summary ==
Nadja is a semi-autobiographical work, whose narrator is a thinly disguised Breton, and is primarily divided into three sections. in the first opens with "WHO AM I?" then the narrator ruminates on a number of Surrealist principles, before ultimately commencing, in the second section of the work, on a narrative account, generally linear, of the encounters he had, spanning roughly ten-day, with the titular character Nadja. She is so named "because in Russian it's the beginning of the word hope, and because it's only the beginning." The narrator becomes obsessed with this woman with whom he, upon a chance encounter while walking through the street, strikes up conversation immediately. He becomes reliant on daily rendezvous, occasionally culminating in romance (a kiss here and there). His true fascination with Nadja, however, is her vision of the world, which is often provoked through a discussion of the work of a number of Surrealist artists, including himself.

A few months later, Nadja's mental condition deteriorates and she is admitted to the Perray-Vaucluse psychiatric hospital. Breton subsequently questions the psychiatric institution and rejects the idea that Nadja's hospitalization should simply be regarded as the predictable consequence of her earlier behavior. He also addresses the possibility that his own influence may have contributed to her already existing delusions. The third section of the work begins with Nadja now “so far away” and moves away from her story toward Breton's reflections on books, love, and the meaning of experience. He introduces his new relationship with Suzanne Muzard and develops a series of reflections and literary associations around her, while also relating a newspaper report that he gives symbolic significance. The book ends with Breton's definition of beauty: “Beauty will be CONVULSIVE or will not be at all.”

== Quotations ==
- "Don't I love her? When I am near her I am nearer things which are near her."
- "Beauty will be convulsive or will not be at all."
- "He cannot enter, he does not enter."
- "I am obliged to reply that I know nothing about it, that in such matters the right to bear witness seems to me to be all that is granted."
- "You could never see this star as I do. You don't understand: It's like the heart of a heartless flower."

== See also ==
- Le Monde's 100 Books of the Century
