= Méret Oppenheim =

German-Swiss surrealist artist (1913–1985)

- Self-portrait, X-Ray of Meret Oppenheim’s Skull, Negative, 1964
- Born: Meret Elisabeth Oppenheim; 6 October 1913; Berlin, German Empire
- Died: 15 November 1985 (aged 72); Basel, Switzerland
- Education: Académie de la Grande Chaumière, Basel School of Arts and Crafts
- Known for: Painting, Sculpture, Poetry
- Notable work: Object: Breakfast in Fur (1936); My Nurse (1936); Giacometti's Ear (1933)
- Movement: Surrealism, Conceptualism
- Awards: Art Award of the City of Basel

Meret (or Méret) Elisabeth Oppenheim (6 October 1913 – 15 November 1985) was a German-born Swiss Surrealist artist and photographer.

== Early life ==
Meret Oppenheim was born on 6 October 1913 in Berlin. She was named after Meretlein, a wild child who lives in the woods, from the novel Green Henry by Gottfried Keller. Oppenheim had two siblings, a sister Kristin (born 1915), and a brother Burkhard (born 1919). Her father, a German-Jewish doctor, was conscripted into the army at the outbreak of war in 1914. Consequently, Oppenheim and her mother, who was Swiss, moved to live with Oppenheim's maternal grandparents in Delémont, Switzerland. In Switzerland, Oppenheim was exposed to a plethora of art and artists from a young age, including Alfred Kubin, German Expressionists, French Impressionists and poems of the Romantics. Oppenheim was also inspired by her aunt, Ruth Wenger, especially by Wenger's devotion to art and her modern lifestyle. During the late 1920s, Oppenheim was further exposed to different artworks connected to Modernism, Expressionism, Fauvism, and Cubism.

By 1928, Oppenheim was introduced to the writings of Carl Jung through her father and was inspired to record her dreams. Oppenheim was interested in Jung's analytical approach, particularly his animus-anima theory. Throughout her life, Oppenheim carefully analyzed her own dreams and transcribed them in detail in her writings. She attempted to use them when addressing “fundamental life questions.” Likewise, Oppenheim used iconography and motifs from Jung's archetypes within her work throughout the years; typical motifs Oppenheim used include spirals and snakes. Oppenheim renounced the term “feminine art” and adopted Jung's ideal androgynous creativity in her art in which masculine and feminine aspects worked simultaneously.

The work of Paul Klee, the focus of a retrospective at the Kunsthalle Basel in 1929, provided another strong influence on Oppenheim, arousing her to the possibilities of abstraction.

In 1931, after receiving her father's permission to quit high school, she faced the choice between going to Paris or Munich to study art. She chose Paris.

In May 1932, at the age of 18, Oppenheim moved to Paris from Basel, Switzerland, and sporadically attended the Académie de la Grande Chaumière to study painting. Her first studio was a hotel room at Montparnasse Hotel in Paris. At this time she produced mainly paintings and drawings. In 1933, Oppenheim met Jean Arp and Alberto Giacometti. After visiting her studio and seeing her work, Arp and Giacometti invited her to participate in the Surrealist exhibition in the “Salon des Surindépendants,” held in Paris between 27 October and 26 November. Oppenheim later met André Breton and began to participate in meetings at the Café de la Place Blanche with the Surrealist circle. She impressed the surrealists with her uninhibited behavior. Shortly after she began to attend meetings regularly with Breton and other acquaintances, Oppenheim's circle was joined by other Surrealist artists such as Marcel Duchamp, Max Ernst, and Man Ray. The conceptual approach favored by Marcel Duchamp, Max Ernst, and Francis Picabia became important to her work.

== Career ==
In 1936, Meret Oppenheim had her first solo exhibition in Basel, Switzerland, at the Galerie Schulthess. She continued to contribute to Surrealist exhibitions until 1960. Many of her pieces consisted of everyday objects arranged to allude to female sexuality and feminine exploitation by the opposite sex. Oppenheim's paintings focused on the same themes. Her abundant strength of character and her self-assurance informed each work she created, conveying a certain comfortable confrontation with life and death. Her originality and audacity established her as a leading figure in the Surrealist movement. In Oppenheim: Object she was described as having embodied and "personified male Surrealism's ideal of the 'femme-enfant.'

In 1937, Oppenheim returned to Basel and this marked the start of her artistic block. She struggled after she met success and worried about her development as an artist. Oppenheim usually worked in spontaneous bursts and at times destroyed her work. Oppenheim took a hiatus from her artistic career in 1939 after an exhibition at the Galerie René Drouin started by Rene Drouin in Paris. In the exhibition she was featured alongside many artists, including Leonor Fini and Max Ernst. She did not share any art with the public again until the 1950s. Oppenheim then reverted to her "original style" and based her new artworks on old sketches and earlier works and creations.

Oppenheim's best known artwork is Object (Le Déjeuner en fourrure) [Object (Breakfast in Fur)] (1936). Oppenheim's Object consists of a teacup, saucer and spoon that she covered with fur (she thought it was from a Chinese gazelle, though MoMA determined that it is not). Fur arguably represents affluence. The cup, hollow yet round, can evoke female genitalia; the spoon, with its phallic shape, adds another erotic note. Object was inspired by a conversation Oppenheim had with Pablo Picasso and his lover Dora Maar at the Café de Flore in Paris. As they admired a fur bracelet Oppenheim had designed, Picasso, according to one version of the story Oppenheim told, said everything could be covered in fur, even a cup and saucer. Oppenheim created Object after Breton invited her to participate in an exhibition of Surrealist objects at the Galerie Charles Ratton in Paris. By covering the tea service with fur, Oppenheim achieved a Surrealist goal by liberating the saucer, spoon, and teacup from their original functions as consumer objects. Viewers experienced various emotions as they observed Object, which was rendered dysfunctional. The artwork's long title was created by Breton (Oppenheim referred to it simply as Object), who combined Leopold Sacher-Masoch's novel Venus in Furs with Édouard Manet's Dejeuner sur l’herbe. During the year of its creation, Object was purchased by Alfred Barr, who hoped to place it in the permanent collection of the Museum of Modern Art in New York, where it was included in the museum's landmark exhibition Fantastic Art: Dada and Surrealism. Due to this purchase, Oppenheim was thought to be the first woman in the museum's permanent collection, and she was dubbed "the First Lady of MoMA." But Barr, who bought the work with his own money, was unable to get conservative trustees to accept it, and it did not enter the permanent collection until 1963 (it entered the museum's study collection in 1946, where it was unseen for many years).

Oppenheim's Object would be one of the main forces that led to her lengthy artistic crisis due to its spiking increase in popularity after being displayed by Barr in New York. Although it brought Oppenheim a large amount of fame, Object reinforced the public's belief that Oppenheim only practiced Surrealism which she found hindered her freedom of artistic expression and exploration of other artistic styles. In fact, Object became so widely known that many misconceptions about Oppenheim and her art were created because of it. For example, many incorrectly believed that Oppenheim mainly created objects in fur. Being known as the artist of Object, Oppenheim was bounded to Surrealism from public expectation, a connection she was trying to avoid. Decades later, in 1972, she artistically commented on its dominance of her career by producing a number of "souvenirs" of Le Déjeuner en fourrure. Object has also been widely interpreted through a Freudian lens, and has been seen in a symbolic sense as a female sexual reference.

Throughout her life, Oppenheim has been willing to pose for photographers. Her most popular photo-shoot with Man Ray deeply depicts her personal stance on femininity. Contrary to the discretion about the gender of Le Déjeuner's creator, the photographs provided an unmistakable monument to her femininity and a testimony to her unwillingness to expose it.

In 1937, Oppenheim returned to Basel, training as an art conservator in order to ensure her financial stability. This marked the beginning of a creative crisis that lasted until 1954. Although she maintained some contact with her friends in Paris, she created very little and destroyed or failed to finish much of what she created. In Basel she became a member of the Gruppe 33 and participated in their group shows, 1945 in the Kunstmuseum Basel.

Oppenheim began working as an art conservator in 1944 during an eighteen year long depressive episode. Oppenheim was known for struggling with her awareness of the oppression of women in society. Oppenheim was also impacted when her father had to flee to Switzerland before World War II due to his Jewish surname; his credentials and training as a doctor were also discredited, leaving him unemployed. As a result, Oppenheim needed to do conservation for financial and emotional relief. She viewed the works she produced in this time of her life as imaginative and “projections of her fantasy.

Oppenheim kept a studio in Bern since 1954 and lived there permanently from 1967 until her death.

In the 1950s Oppenheim became friends with Arnold Rudlinger, the director of the Kunsthall Bern. The varying programs and exhibitions at the Kunsthall Bern placed Oppenheim in a stimulating artistic environment that enabled her to explore international art trends while working alongside Dieter Roth, Daniel Spoerri, and Markus Raetz.

In 1956, Oppenheim designed the costumes and masks for Daniel Spoerri’s production of Picasso’s play Le Désir attrapé par la queue in Berne. She and artist Lilly Keller were cast as the curtains. Three years later, in 1959, she organized a Spring Banquet (Le Festin) in Bern for a few friends at which food was served on the body of a naked woman. The exhibit caused controversy, with Oppenheim accused of treating the female body as on object to be devoured. With Oppenheim's permission, Andre Breton restaged the performance later that year at the opening of the Exposition inteRnatiOnale du Surrealisme (EROS), at the Galerie Cordier in Paris. Outside its original intimate setting, the performance was overly provocative and Oppenheim felt her original intention for the work was lost. Oppenheim felt surrealism changed after World War II and she never exhibited with the Surrealists again.

In the 1960s Oppenheim distanced herself from the Surrealists. She felt she belonged with the post-war generation, which was younger. Oppenheim was notably “true to herself” and undertook novel topics in her work with “fresh pictorial language.” Despite this, Oppenheim never had her own students, but sometimes would mentor younger artists. In 1968 Oppenheim had a solo exhibition at the Galerie Martin Krebs in Bern.

In 1982 Oppenheim won the Berlin Art Prize and was featured in Rudi Fuchs’ exhibition documenta 7. In this year Meret Oppenheim: Defiance in the Face of Freedom was published, and she was commissioned to make a public fountain by Berlin's art commission. Her fountain was cast in 1983 and had mixed public reviews. Due to the fact it lights up at night, newspapers called it a “lighthouse” and “an eyesore.” Eventually it became covered in algae and moss, allowing the public to accept it. In 1983 Oppenheim also partook a touring exhibition through the Goethe Institute in Italy. In 1984 she had a solo exhibition in Kunsthalle Bern in Switzerland along with Musee d’Art Moderne in Paris, France. Thus, Oppenheim was one of the only “female artists of her generation to be recognized internationally while she was alive.”

== Oppenheim and Surrealism ==
After Oppenheim moved to Paris, her first contacts became Alberto Giacommetti and Jean Arp. She was then introduced to Marcel Duchamp and Man Ray, and was in 1936 asked to exhibit her work in a show at the Museum of Modern Art in New York. Her paintings were hung alongside those in the Paris and New York art scenes, including Salvador Dalí and Giacommetti. After the exhibion of Object Man Ray anointed Oppenheim as "Surrealism's 'muse.'"

Oppenheim fit in with the Surrealists because she was seeking "acceptance and approval for the way she was living her life." She was skeptical of any concrete ideology, and Surrealism allowed her to experiment within her art. This is evident in her painting Sitting Figure with Folded Hands, which has been described as "sexless, featureless, placeless...a portrait of the attitude of its maker."

Oppenheim experimented with diverse styles throughout her career, including while she identified as a Surrealist. She experimented with “veristic surrealism” and had a quality of openness that allowed her work to maintain relevance. Unlike other Surrealists that viewed dreams as a way to unlock the subconscious, Oppenheim used painting and her dreams as an “analogy to its (the subconsciousness’) forms“. Likewise, Oppenheim used versatile symbols, partly influenced by Carl Jung, that provided mystery and ambiguity. Similarly, unlike other Surrealists, Oppenheim used symbols with a “fluid and changeable impact” and produced works that were cohesive through frequent and organized ideas rather than formal language. To direct viewers towards her meaning, she would strategically title her works.

Nonetheless, Oppenheim's Object persists as an example of “Surrealist fetishism,” as its function follows its form; the fur on the cup renders it not functional.

== Exhibitions ==
In 1936, at the beginning of her career, Oppenheim was included in two important Surrealist exhibitions outside of Paris: The International Surrealist Exhibition, New Burlington Galleries, London and Fantastic Art Dada Surrealism, The Museum of Modern Art, New York.

In 1943, Oppenheim's work was included in Peggy Guggenheim's show Exhibition by 31 Women at the Art of This Century gallery in New York.

Oppenheim's first retrospective was hosted by Moderna Museet Stockholm in 1967. In Switzerland, her first retrospective was held at Museum der Stadt, Solothurn (1974) and traveled to Kunstmuseum Winterthur and Wilhelm-Lehmbruck Museum, Duisburg, Germany in 1975.

In 1996, the Solomon R. Guggenheim Museum mounted Oppenheim's first major museum show in the United States at a time when renewed interest in her work, particularly among young artists, had already begun in Europe.

In 2013, a comprehensive retrospective of Oppenheim's work opened at the Martin-Gropius-Bau in Berlin, gathering the artist's paintings, sketches, sculptures, masks, clothing, furniture, and jewelry. Lenders included singer David Bowie, the Swiss retail tycoon and art dealer Ursula Hauser, and the Dutch diamond magnate Sylvio Perlstein.

From April 26 to September 14, 2014, the National Museum of Women in the Arts exhibited Meret Oppenheim: Tender Friendships. “This exhibition explores friendship as a source of inspiration and support. Inspired by the friendship between two 18th-century poets, Bettine Brentano and Karoline von Günderode, Oppenheim created paintings, prints, and poems dedicated to the two women, some of which are featured in the exhibition.”

In 2022, MoMA put on a retrospective exhibition that highlighted Oppenheim's continuous production over her lengthy career.

== Recognition ==
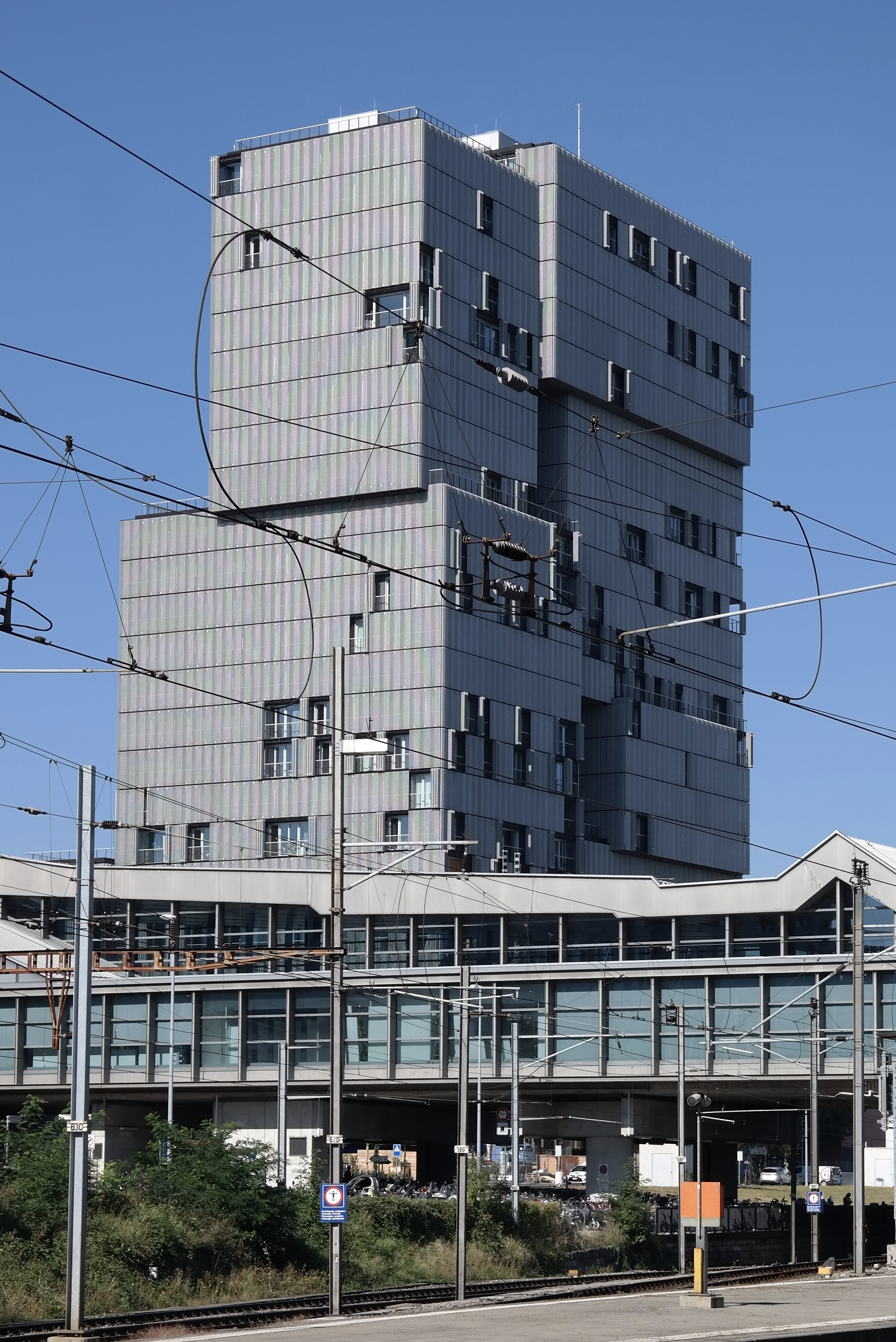
The Méret Oppenheim Hochhaus in Basel, Switzerland

Oppenheim received the Art Award of the City of Basel on January 16, 1975. In her acceptance speech, Oppenheim coined the phrase "Freedom is not given to you — you have to take it." In 1982, three years before her death, she received the 1982 Berliner Kunstpreis.

In 2019, Basel inaugurated a plaza, road, fountain and a high-rise apartment building (by Herzog & de Meuron) all named after Oppenheim in the city center. The large fountain features her sculpture Spirale (der Gang der Natur).

== Legacy ==
Oppenheim has been esteemed as a figure of “feminist identification” for the women's movement and a role model for younger generations due to her “socio-critical and emancipatory attitude.” In 1975 Oppenheim gave a speech at “the presentation of Basler Kunstpreis” and directly asked women “to demonstrate to society by the invalidity of taboos by adopting unconventional ways of life” and utilize their intellect as a creative strength without fear.

Oppenheim, who died in 1985, at 72, kept careful notes about which patrons and colleagues she liked and where her works ended up. She dictated which of her writings should be published and when, and there are puzzling gaps, since she destroyed some material. The archive and much artwork have been entrusted to institutions in Bern, including the Museum of Fine Arts and the National Library.

Levy Galerie, founded in 1970 by Hamburg resident Thomas Levy, represents the estate of Meret Oppenheim, in close collaboration with the artist's family.

On October 6, 2017, Google celebrated her 104th birthday with a Google Doodle.

In 2018, Oppenheim was the subject of a short documentary by Cheri Gaulke, Gloria's Call.
