= International Journal of Francophone Studies =

Academic journal

International Journal of Francophone Studies is a quarterly peer-reviewed academic journal published by Intellect. It was established in 1998. The journal is abstracted and indexed by CSA, Academic Search, Historical Abstracts, British Humanities Index, Scopus, and EBSCOhost. The editor-in-chief is Kamal Salhi (University of Leeds).

The journal complements the area of scholarly interest in the French-speaking regions of the world, bringing a location of linguistic, cultural, historical and social dynamics within a single arena.
