= Franklin Rosemont =

American poet (1943–2009)

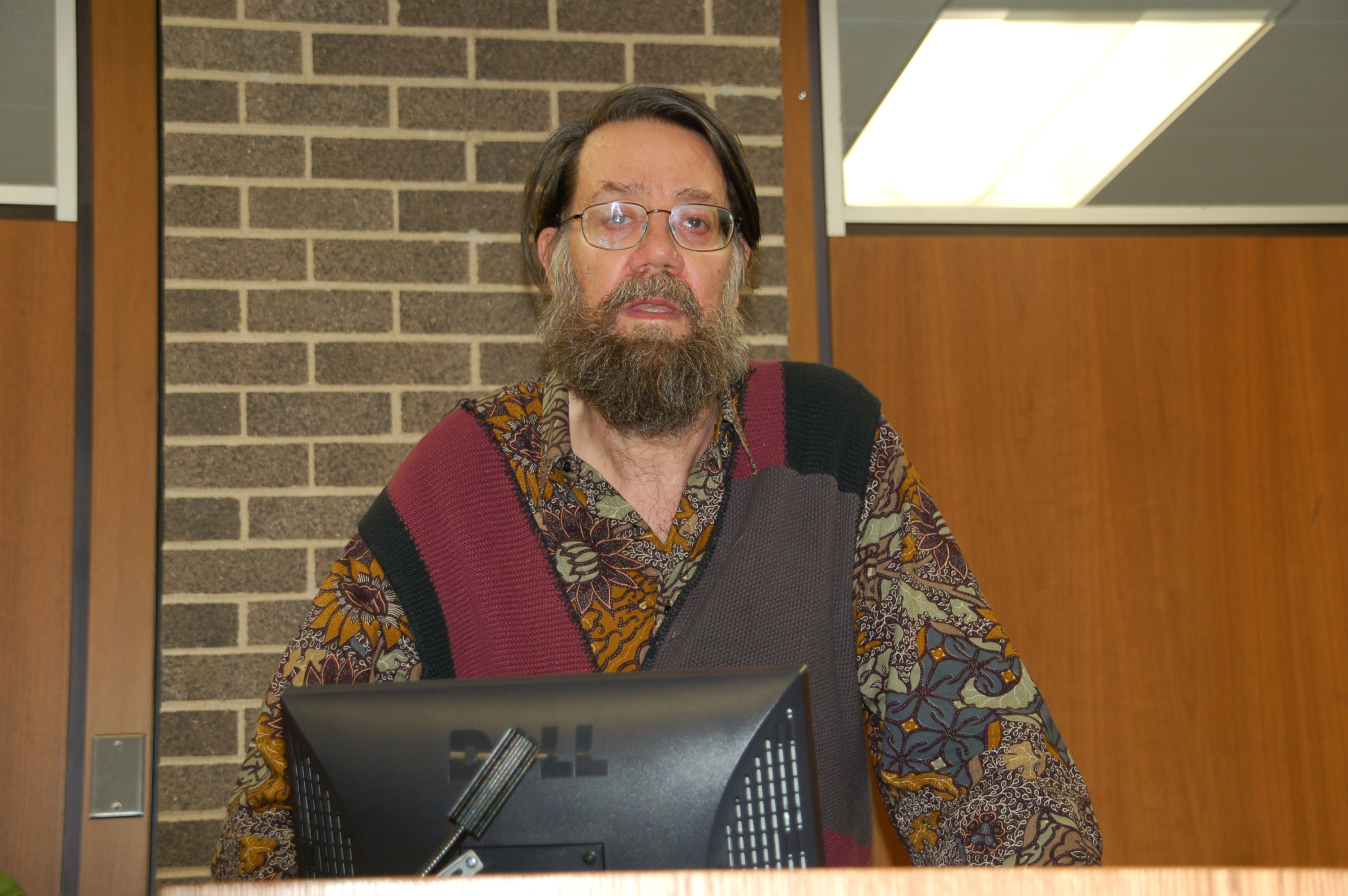
- Franklin Rosemont speaking at Loyola University, Chicago, 2007

Franklin Rosemont (1943–2009) was an American poet, artist, historian, street speaker, and co-founder of the Chicago Surrealist Group. Over four decades, Franklin produced a body of work, of declarations, manifestos, poetry, collage, hidden histories, and other interventions.

== Early life ==
He was born in Chicago, Illinois, to Henry, a typographer and labor activist, and Sally, a jazz musician. In 1960, Rosemont dropped out of Proviso East High School, Maywood, Illinois, but was admitted to Roosevelt University in Chicago in 1962, studying under African-American scholar St. Clair Drake.

== Career ==
A self-identified anarchist, Rosemont edited the 1960s anarchist publication Rebel Worker. He edited and wrote an introduction for What is Surrealism?: Selected Writings of André Breton, and edited Arsenal/Surrealist Subversion, The Rise & Fall of the DIL Pickle: Jazz-Age Chicago's Wildest & Most Outrageously Creative Hobohemian Nightspot and Juice Is Stranger Than Friction: Selected Writings of T-Bone Slim. With his wife Penelope Rosemont, herself the author and editor of several books and active in the Chicago Surrealists, and poet and storyteller Paul Garon, he edited The Forecast is Hot!. His work has been deeply concerned with both the history of surrealism (writing a forward for Max Ernst and Alchemy: A Magician in Search of Myth) and of the radical labor movement in America, for instance, writing a biography of Joe Hill. According to PoetrySoup.com Franklin Rosemont "became perhaps "the most productive scholar of labor and the left in the United States." Rosemont was a member of the Industrial Workers of the World and Students for a Democratic Society. In 1964, he helped organize a strike among fellow blueberry pickers in Michigan.

== Publications ==
Rosemont is the author of the poetry collections The Morning of a Machine Gun: Twenty Poems & Documents. Profusely Illustrated By the Author, The Apple of the Automatic Zebra's Eye, and Penelope: A Poem, as well as An Open Entrance to the Shut Palace of Wrong Numbers, a book that explores the phenomenon of "wrong numbers" from a surrealist perspective, which was published by Black Swan Press in 2003. He also edited and introduced Hobohemia: Emma Goldman, Lucy Parsons, Ben Reitman & other agitators & outsiders in 1920s/30s Chicago, by Frank O. Beck.

Rosemont, Franklin (2002). Joe Hill. Chicago: Charles H. Kerr Publishing Company. ISBN 0-88286-265-0.

In 1990, he published a collected edition of short stories by the socialist utopian author Edward Bellamy, titled Apparitions of Things to Come. He is co-editor, with Archie Green, David Roediger, and Salvatore Salerno, of The Big Red Songbook (Chicago: Charles H. Kerr, 2007).
