= Elisa Breton =

French artist and writer (1906-2000)

Elisa Breton (b. Viña del Mar in Chile, 25 April 1906, d. Le Kremlin-Bicêtre, 5 April 2000), was a French artist and writer, and the third wife of the French writer and surrealist André Breton.

== Biography ==
Elisa Breton's maiden name was Elisa Latte Elena Bindhoff Enet. An accomplished pianist, she married the Chilean politician Benjamin Claro Velasco. They had a daughter, Ximena. After her divorce, she immigrated to the United States with her daughter. On 13 August 1943, Ximena drowned during a boat trip off the coast of Massachusetts. After attempting suicide, Bindhoff Enet was joined in New York by a friend who came from Chile to support her.

In 1943, Bindhoff Enet first met André Breton, the leader of the Surrealist movement, in a French restaurant on New York's 56th Street in Manhattan. Breton lived on the same street, and frequented this restaurant. He noticed Bindhoff Enet, introduced himself as a French writer and asked permission to exchange a few words with her. The attraction was mutual:

Quand le sort t'a portée à ma rencontre, la plus grande ombre était en moi et je puis dire que c'est en moi que cette fenêtre s'est ouverte ("When fate has brought you to meet me, the greatest shadow was in me, and I can say that it is in me that this window has been opened.")

In the summer of 1944, they traveled in the Gaspé Peninsula in the northeast of Canada. Bindhoff Enet was the inspiration behind Breton's book Arcane 17, where he discusses the death of her daughter in the final prose quartet of Arcane 17, comparing it to the death and resurrection of the Egyptian god Osiris. After the publication of the book, Breton dubbed the manuscript, "this book of high truancy." In August 1945, for practical reasons, Breton and Bindhoff Enet married in Reno, Nevada. On this occasion, they visited Hopi Indian reservations. They returned to France on 25 May 1946.

Following Breton's death in 1966, Elisa Breton “sought to foster what she saw as authentic surrealist activity”. However, she also contributed some works to the surrealist movement, including to the Surrealist journals Médium and Le Surréalisme même, some collages, and a chapter in Le Surréalisme et la Peinture. Elisa Breton was also a mainstay in the Paris Surrealist Group until the major split of 1969. She produced very few works and did not like to “push herself foreword” among the group; she seldom exhibited and is therefore not as well known as other artists in the group. However, Marie Wilson, an American artist active in the Paris Surrealist Group from 1953 to 1960, called Elisa Breton, “The most remarkable woman in the group… a profound and marvelous woman, who contributed enormously to the evolution of surrealism”.

In the shadow of surrealism's theorist, she expressed her talent by making surrealist boxes as well.

== Selected works ==
Surrealist boxes

- La Loi du vison, 1959
- Oiseau de plastique, ressort de réveil, dé à jouer, 1970
- Lucy, faire, 1971
- Ne quittez pas, 1972
- Oiseau-lire, 1973
- Méduse, sculpture, 1959

Writing

- Preface to the exhibition catalog devoted to the painter Jean-Paul Riopelle, 1949
- Translation of Alpha et omega by Edvard Munch, éd. Le Nyctalope, 1980
- André Breton, album of ten original photographs signed by Elisa, éd. Au fil de l'encre, Paris, 1993

== Bibliography ==
- Henri Béhar, André Breton, le grand indésirable, Paris, Fayard, 2005, pp. 406 ff.
- Georgiana Colvile, Scandaleusement d'elles. Trente-quatre femmes surréalistes, Paris, Jean-Michel Place, 1999. ISBN 2858934967, pp. 42 ff., with a portrait by the photographer Dora Maar
- Étienne-Alain Hubert, André Breton, œuvres complètes, tome 3 : notice, pp. 1161–1199
- Mark Polizzoti, André Breton, Paris, Gallimard, 1995, pp. 593 ff.

Citations

- André Breton, Arcane 17, in Œuvres complètes, tome 3, Paris, Gallimard, Bibliothèque de la Pléiade, 1999, pp. 35–111.
