= André Breton =

French co-founder of Surrealism (1896–1966)

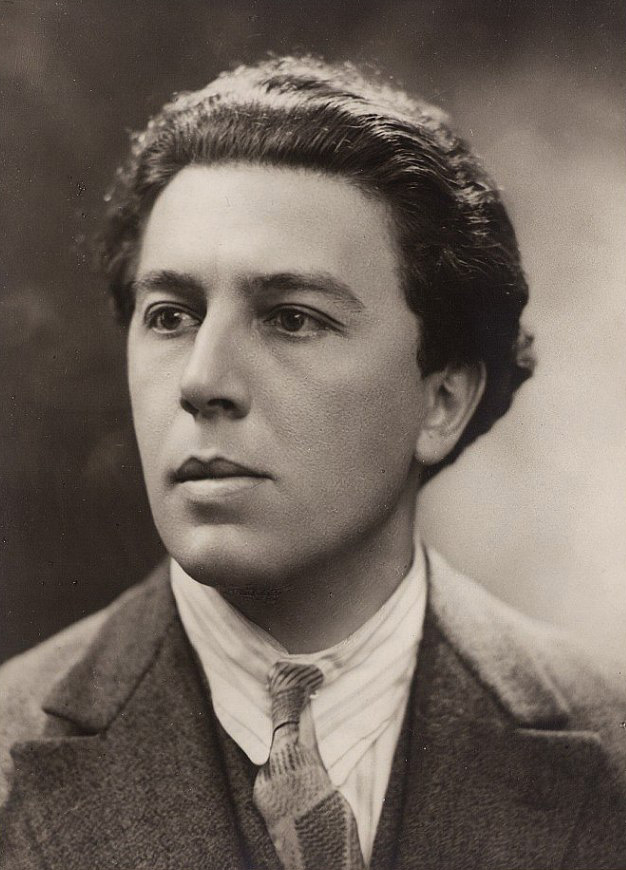
- Breton in 1927
- Born: André Robert Breton; 19 February 1896; Tinchebray, France
- Died: 28 September 1966 (aged 70); Paris, France
- Occupation: Writer
- Spouses: Simone Kahn (m. 1921; div. 1931) Jacqueline Lamba (m. 1934; div. 1943) Elisa Bindhoff Enet (m. 1945–1966)
- Children: 1
- Writing career
- Period: 20th century
- Genres: Poetry, essays, novels, aesthetics
- Notable works: Surrealist Manifesto; Les Champs Magnétiques; Nadja; L'Amour fou; Le Surréalisme et la peinture
- Movement: Surrealism

André Robert Breton (/brəˈtɔːn/; French: [ɑ̃dʁe ʁɔbɛʁ bʁətɔ̃]; 19 February 1896 – 28 September 1966) was a French writer and poet, known as a principal theorist and co-founder of surrealism. His writings include the first Surrealist Manifesto (Manifeste du surréalisme) of 1924, in which he defined surrealism as "pure psychic automatism".

Along with his role as leader of the surrealist movement he is the author of celebrated books such as Nadja and L'Amour fou (Mad Love). Those activities, combined with his critical and theoretical work on writing and the visual arts, made André Breton a major figure in 20th-century French art and literature.

== Biography ==
André Breton was the only son born to a family of modest means in Tinchebray (Orne) in Normandy, France. His father, Louis-Justin Breton, was a policeman and atheist, and his mother, Marguerite-Marie-Eugénie Le Gouguès, was a former seamstress. Breton attended medical school, where he developed a particular interest in mental illness. His education was interrupted when he was conscripted for World War I.

During World War I, he worked in a neurological ward in Nantes, where he met the Alfred Jarry devotee Jacques Vaché, whose anti-social attitude and disdain for established artistic tradition influenced Breton considerably. Vaché committed suicide at age 23, and his war-time letters to Breton and others were published in a volume entitled Lettres de guerre (1919), for which Breton wrote four introductory essays.

Breton married his first wife, Simone Kahn, on 15 September 1921. The couple relocated to rue Fontaine No. 42 in Paris on 1 January 1922. The apartment on rue Fontaine (in the Pigalle district) became home to Breton's collection of more than 5,300 items: modern paintings, drawings, sculptures, photographs, books, art catalogs, journals, manuscripts, and works of popular and Oceanic art. Like his father, he was an atheist.

=== From Dada to Surrealism ===
Breton launched the review Littérature in 1919, with Louis Aragon and Philippe Soupault. He also associated with Dadaist Tristan Tzara.

In Les Champs Magnétiques (The Magnetic Fields), a collaboration with Soupault, he implemented the principle of automatic writing. With the publication of his Surrealist Manifesto in 1924 came the founding of the magazine La Révolution surréaliste and the Bureau of Surrealist Research. A group of writers became associated with him: Soupault, Louis Aragon, Paul Éluard, René Crevel, Michel Leiris, Benjamin Péret, Antonin Artaud, and Robert Desnos.

Eager to combine the themes of personal transformation found in the works of Arthur Rimbaud with the politics of Karl Marx, Breton and others joined the French Communist Party in 1927, from which he was expelled in 1933. Nadja, a novel about his imaginative encounter with a woman who later becomes mentally ill, was published in 1928. Due to the economic depression, he had to sell his art collection, but he later rebuilt it.

In December 1929, Breton published the Second manifeste du surréalisme (Second Manifesto of Surrealism), which contained an oft-quoted declaration for which many, including Albert Camus, reproached Breton: "The simplest surrealist act consists of dashing down into the street, revolver in hand, and firing blindly into the crowd."

In reaction to the Second Manifesto, writers and artists published in 1930 a collective collection of pamphlets against Breton, entitled (in allusion to an earlier title by Breton) Un Cadavre. The authors were members of the surrealist movement who were insulted by Breton or had otherwise opposed his leadership. The pamphlet criticized Breton's oversight and influence over the movement. It marked a divide amidst the early surrealists. Georges Limbour and Georges Ribemont-Dessaignes commented on the sentence where shooting at random in the crowd is described as the simplest surrealist act. Limbour saw in it an example of buffoonery and shamelessness and Ribemont-Dessaignes called Breton a hypocrite, a cop and a priest.

After the publication of this pamphlet against Breton, the Manifesto had a second edition, where Breton added in a note: "While I say that this act is the simplest, it is clear that my intention is not to recommend it to all merely by virtue of its simplicity; to quarrel with me on this subject is much like a bourgeois asking any non-conformist why he does not commit suicide, or asking a revolutionary why he hasn't moved to the USSR."

In 1935, there was a conflict between Breton and the Soviet writer and journalist Ilya Ehrenburg during the first International Congress of Writers for the Defense of Culture, which opened in Paris in June. Breton had been insulted by Ehrenburg—along with all fellow surrealists—in a pamphlet which said, among other things, that surrealists shunned work, favouring parasitism, and that they endorsed "onanism, pederasty, fetishism, exhibitionism, and even sodomy." Breton slapped Ehrenburg several times on the street, which resulted in surrealists being expelled from the Congress. René Crevel, who according to Salvador Dalí was "the only serious communist among surrealists", was isolated from Breton and other surrealists, who were unhappy with Crevel because of his bisexuality and annoyed with communists in general.

In 1938, Breton accepted a cultural commission from the French government to travel to Mexico. After a conference at the National Autonomous University of Mexico about surrealism, Breton stated (after getting lost in Mexico City because no one met him at the airport), "I don't know why I came here. Mexico is the most surrealist country in the world."

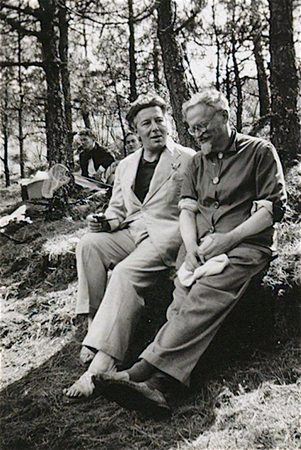
Trotsky and Breton in Mexico, 1938

However, visiting Mexico provided the opportunity to meet Leon Trotsky. Breton and other surrealists traveled via a long boat ride from Patzcuaro to the town of Erongarícuaro. Diego Rivera and Frida Kahlo were among the visitors to the hidden community of intellectuals and artists. Together, Breton and Trotsky wrote the Manifesto for an Independent Revolutionary Art (published under the names of Breton and Diego Rivera) calling for "complete freedom of art," which was becoming increasingly difficult with the world situation of the time.

=== World War II and exile ===
Breton was again in the medical corps of the French Army at the start of World War II. The Vichy government banned his writings as "the very negation of the national revolution" and Breton escaped, with the help of the American Varian Fry and Hiram "Harry" Bingham IV, to the United States and the Caribbean during 1941. He emigrated to New York City and lived there for a few years. In 1942, Breton organized a groundbreaking surrealist exhibition at Yale University.

In 1942, Breton collaborated with artist Wifredo Lam on the publication of Breton's poem "Fata Morgana", which was illustrated by Lam.

Breton got to know Martinican writers Suzanne Césaire and Aimé Césaire, and later composed the introduction to the 1947 edition of Aimé Césaire's Cahier d'un retour au pays natal. During his exile in New York City he met Elisa Bindhoff, the Chilean woman who became his third wife.

In 1944, he and Elisa traveled to the Gaspé Peninsula in Québec, where he wrote Arcanum 17, a book which expresses his fears of World War II, describes the marvels of the Percé Rock and the extreme northeastern part of North America, and celebrates his new romance with Elisa.

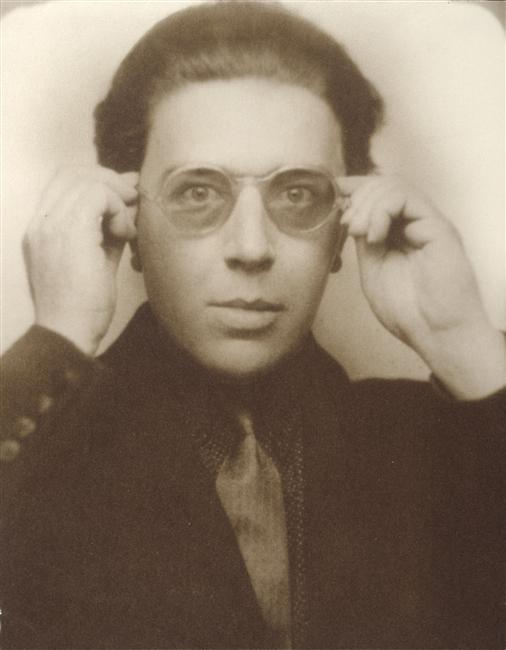
André Breton in 1924

During his visit to Haiti in 1945–1946, he sought to connect surrealist politics and automatist practices with the legacies of the Haitian Revolution and the ritual practices of Vodou possession. Recent developments in Haitian painting were central to his efforts, as can be seen from a comment that Breton left in the visitors' book at the Centre d'Art in Port-au-Prince: "Haitian painting will drink the blood of the phoenix. And, with the epaulets of [Jean-Jacques] Dessalines, it will ventilate the world." Breton was specifically referring to the work of painter and Vodou priest Hector Hyppolite, whom he identified as the first artist to directly depict Vodou scenes and the lwa (Vodou deities), as opposed to hiding them in chromolithographs of Catholic saints or invoking them through impermanent vevé (abstracted forms drawn with powder during rituals). Breton's writings on Hyppolite were undeniably central to the artist's international status from the late 1940s on, but the surrealist readily admitted that his understanding of Hyppolite's art was inhibited by their lack of a common language. Returning to France with multiple paintings by Hyppolite, Breton integrated this artwork into the increased surrealist focus on the occult, myth, and magic.

Breton's sojourn in Haiti coincided with the overthrow of the country's president, Élie Lescot, by a radical protest movement. Breton's visit was warmly received by La Ruche, a youth journal of revolutionary art and politics, which in January 1946 published a talk given by Breton alongside a commentary which Breton described as having "an insurrectional tone". The issue concerned was suppressed by the government, sparking a student strike, and two days later, a general strike: Lescot was toppled a few days later. Among the figures associated with both La Ruche and the instigation of the revolt were the painter and photographer Gérald Bloncourt and the writers René Depestre and Jacques Stephen Alexis. In subsequent interviews Breton downplayed his personal role in the unrest, stressing that "the misery, and thus, the patience of the Haitian people, were at the breaking point" at the time and stating that "it would be absurd to say that I alone incited the fall of the government". Michael Löwy has argued that the lectures that Breton gave during his time in Haiti resonated with the youth associated with La Ruche and the student movement, resulting in them "plac(ing) them as a banner on their journal" and "t(aking) hold of them as they would a weapon". Löwy has identified three themes in Breton's talks which he believes would have struck a particular chord with the audience, namely surrealism's faith in youth, Haiti's revolutionary heritage, and a quote from Jacques Roumain extolling the revolutionary potential of the Haitian masses.

=== Later life ===
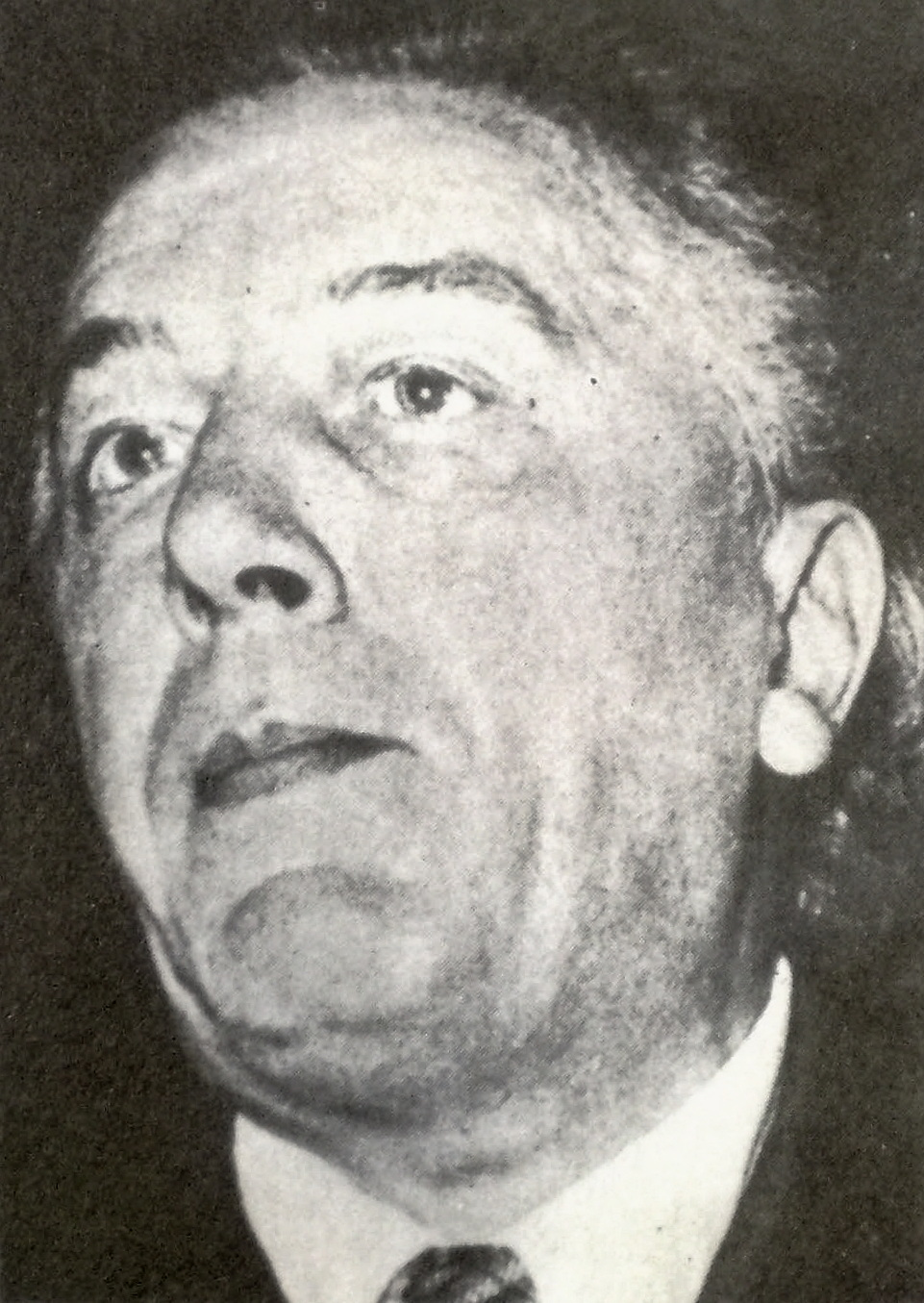
Breton in the 1960s

Breton returned to Paris in 1946, where he opposed French colonialism (for example as a signatory of the Manifesto of the 121 against the Algerian War) and continued, until his death, to foster a second group of surrealists in the form of expositions or reviews (La Brèche, 1961–65). In 1959, he organized an exhibit in Paris.

Breton consistently supported the francophone Anarchist Federation and he continued to offer his solidarity after the Platformists around founder and Secretary General Georges Fontenis transformed the FA into the Fédération communiste libertaire (FCL).

André Breton died at the age of 70 in 1966, and was buried in the Cimetière des Batignolles in Paris.

== Legacy ==
=== Breton as a collector ===
Breton was an avid collector of art, ethnographic material, and unusual trinkets. He was particularly interested in materials from the northwest coast of North America. Due to personal financial difficulties, in 1931, he had to auction off most of his collection (along with that of his friend Paul Éluard). He subsequently rebuilt the collection in his studio and home at 42 rue Fontaine. The collection grew to over 5,300 items: modern paintings, drawings, sculptures, photographs, books, art catalogs, journals, manuscripts, and works of popular and Oceanic art.

French anthropologist Claude Lévi-Strauss endorsed Breton's skill in authentication based on their time together in 1940s New York.

After Breton's death on 28 September 1966, his third wife, Elisa, and his daughter, Aube, allowed students and researchers access to his archive and collection. After thirty-six years, when attempts to establish a surrealist foundation to protect the collection were opposed, the collection was auctioned by Calmels Cohen at Drouot-Richelieu. A wall of the apartment is preserved at the Centre Georges Pompidou.

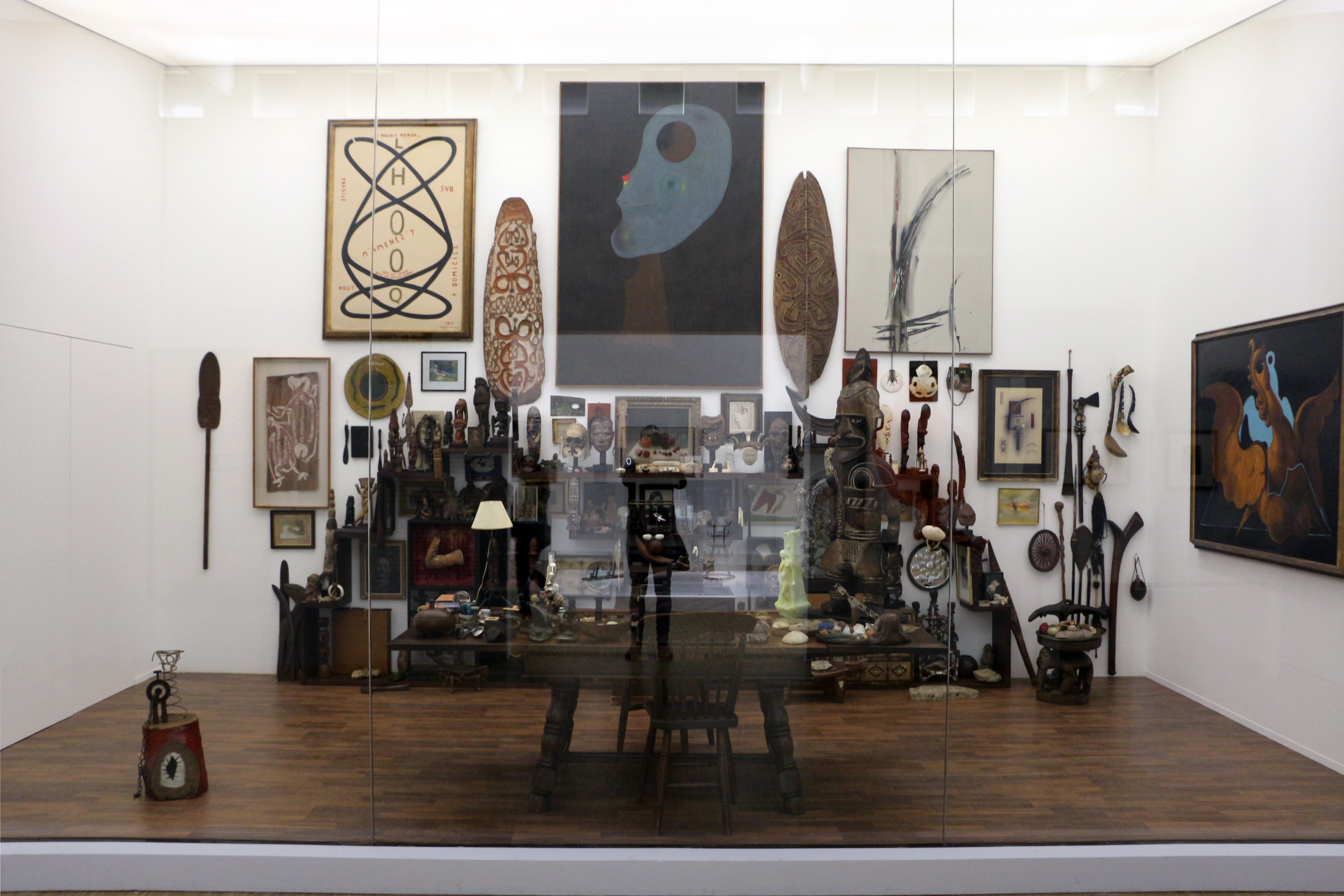
Reconstructed wall of Breton's studio at the Centre Pompidou

Nine previously partly unpublished manuscripts, including the Manifeste du surréalisme, were auctioned by Sotheby's in May 2008.

== Personal life ==
Breton married three times:

- from 1921 to 1931, to Simone Collinet, née Kahn (1897–1980)
- from 1934 to 1943, to Jacqueline Lamba, with whom he had his only child, a daughter, Aube Elléouët Breton
- from 1945 to 1966 (his death), to Elisa Bindhoff Enet

== Works ==
Year	Original Title	English Title / Meaning	Co-author(s) / Notes
1919	Mont de piété	"Mount of piety"	—N/a
1920	S'il vous plaît	If You Please	—N/a
1920	Les Champs magnétiques	The Magnetic Fields	with Philippe Soupault
1923	Clair de terre	Earthlight	—N/a
1924	Les Pas perdus	The Lost Steps	—N/a
1924	Manifeste du surréalisme	Surrealist Manifesto	—N/a
1924	Poisson soluble	"Soluble fish"	—N/a
1924	Un cadavre	"A corpse"	—N/a
1926	Légitime défense	"Legitimate defense"	—N/a
1928	Le Surréalisme et la peinture	Surrealism and Painting	Expanded editions in 1945 and 1965
1928	Nadja	Nadja	Expanded edition 1963
1930	Ralentir travaux	"Slow down, men at work"	with René Char and Paul Éluard
1930	Deuxième Manifeste du surréalisme	The Second Manifesto of Surrealism	—N/a
1930	L'Immaculée Conception	Immaculate Conception	with Paul Éluard
1931	L'Union libre	"Free union"	—N/a
1932	Misère de la poésie	"Poetry's misery"	—N/a
1932	Le Revolver à cheveux blancs	"The white-haired revolver"	—N/a
1932	Les Vases communicants	Communicating Vessels	Expanded edition 1955
1933	Le Message automatique	The Automatic Message	—N/a
1934	Qu'est-ce que le surréalisme?	What Is Surrealism?	—N/a
1934	Point du jour	Break of Day	—N/a
1934	L'Air de l'eau	"The air of the water"	—N/a
1935	Position politique du surréalisme	"Political position of surrealism"	—N/a
1936	Au lavoir noir	"At the black washtub"	—N/a
1936	Notes sur la poésie	"Notes on poetry"	with Paul Éluard
1937	Le Château étoilé	"The starry castle"	—N/a
1937	L'Amour fou	Mad Love	—N/a
1938	Trajectoire du rêve	"Trajectory of dream"	—N/a
1938	Dictionnaire abrégé du surréalisme	"Abridged dictionary of surrealism"	with Paul Éluard
1938	Pour un art révolutionnaire indépendant	"For an independent revolutionary art"	with Diego Rivera
1940	Anthologie de l'humour noir	Anthology of Black Humor	Expanded edition 1966
1941	"Fata morgana"	—N/a	A long poem included in subsequent anthologies
1943	Pleine marge	"Full margin"	—N/a
1944	Arcane 17	Arcanum 17	—N/a
1945	Situation du surréalisme entre les deux guerres	"Situation of surrealism between the two wars"	—N/a
1946	Yves Tanguy	—N/a	Monograph on Yves Tanguy
1946	Les Manifestes du surréalisme	Manifestoes of Surrealism	Expanded editions 1955 and 1962
1946	Young Cherry Trees Secured Against Hares – Jeunes cerisiers garantis contre les lièvres	—N/a	Bilingual edition of poems translated by Edouard Roditi
1947	Ode à Charles Fourier	Ode to Charles Fourier	—N/a
1948	Martinique, charmeuse de serpents	Martinique: Snake Charmer	with André Masson
1948	La Lampe dans l'horloge	"The lamp in the clock"	—N/a
1948	Poèmes 1919–48	"Poems 1919–48"	—N/a
1949	Flagrant délit	"Red-handed"	—N/a
1952	Entretiens	Conversations: The Autobiography of Surrealism	—N/a
1953	La Clé des champs	Free Rein	—N/a
1954	Farouche à quatre feuilles	"Four-leaf feral"	with Lise Deharme, Julien Gracq, Jean Tardieu
1957	L'Art magique	Magical Art	—N/a
1959	Constellations	Constellations	with Joan Miró
1961	Le la	"The A"	—N/a
1966	Clair de terre	Earthlight	Anthology of poems 1919–1936
1968	Signe ascendant	"Ascendant sign"	Anthology of poems 1935–1961
1970	Perspective cavalière	Cavalier perspective	—N/a
1988	Breton : Oeuvres complètes, tome 1	"Breton: The Complete Works, tome 1"	—N/a
1992	Breton : Oeuvres complètes, tome 2	"Breton: The Complete Works, tome 2"	—N/a
1999	Breton : Oeuvres complètes, tome 3	"Breton: The Complete Works, tome 3"	—N/a
"—" indicates that an English title is unavailable, or that there are no co-authors or additional notes.

== See also ==
- Anti-art
- Hector Hyppolite
- Transatlantic (recurring figure in 2023 TV series)
