= Anahuacalli Museum =

Museum and arts center in Mexico City

- Museo Diego Rivera Anahuacalli
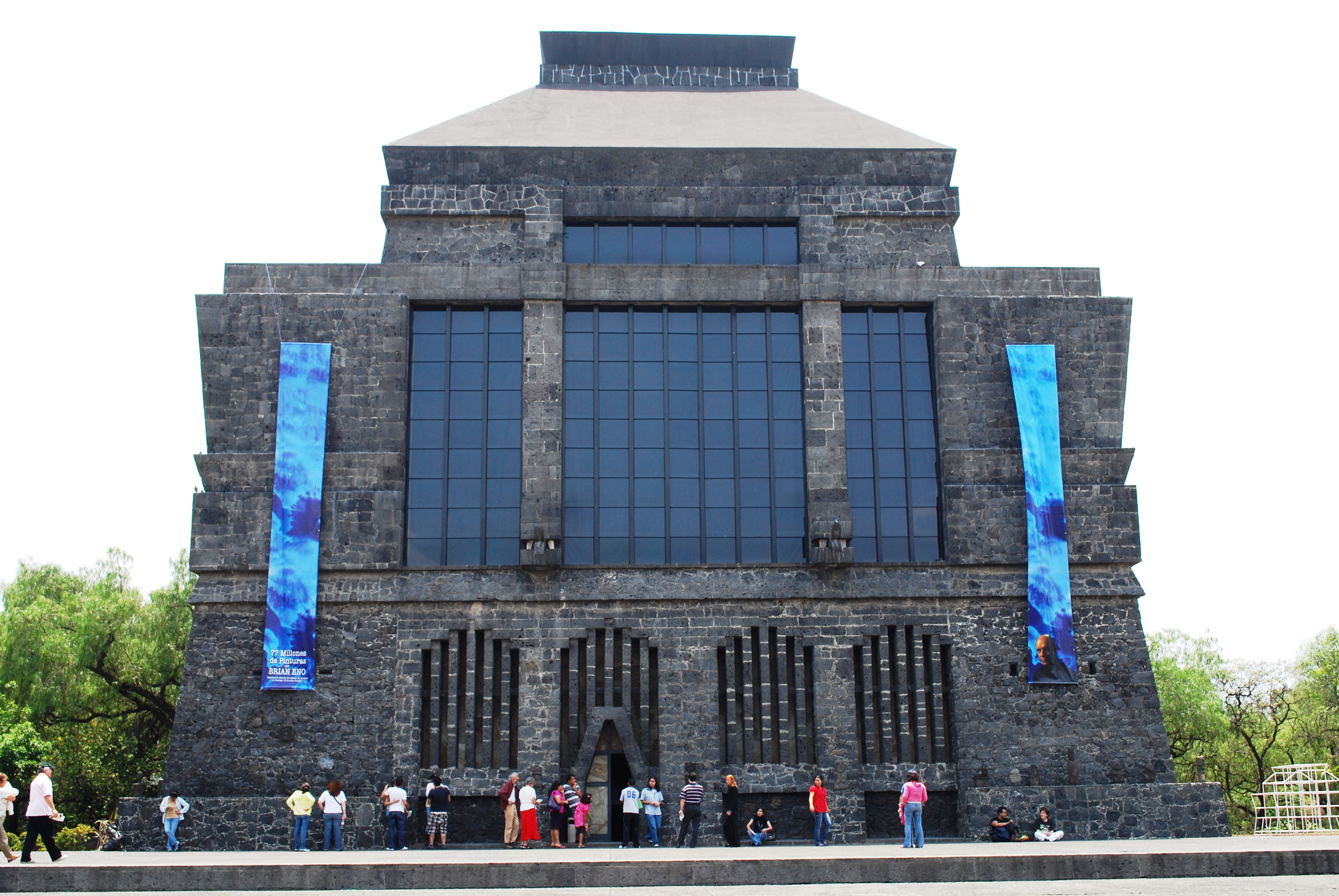
- Front view

- Location in Mexico City
- Established: 1964
- Location: Museo 150, San Pablo Tepetlapa, 04620, Coyoacán, Mexico City, Mexico
- Coordinates: 19°19′21″N 99°08′39″W
- Architects: Juan O'Gorman and Heriberto Pagelson
- Website: www.museoanahuacalli.org.mx

The Diego Rivera Anahuacalli Museum is a museum and arts center in Mexico City, located in the San Pablo de Tepetlapa neighborhood of Coyoacán, 10 minutes by car from the Frida Kahlo Museum, as well as from the tourist neighborhood of this district.

The Anahuacalli (from the Nahuatl word, whose meaning is "house surrounded by water"), is a temple of the arts designed by the Mexican muralist Diego Rivera. This museum stands out for its extensive collection of pre-Columbian art, as well as for its Ecological Space that protects endemic flora and fauna. Rivera designed its architecture in order to safeguard his vast collection of pre-Hispanic pieces, while exhibiting the most beautiful works of this set in the museum's main building. Accordingly, a selection of 2,000 artworks, especially well executed and preserved, has been on display since the opening of the Anahuacalli to the public on September 18, 1964.

The extravagant architecture of the building is inspired by Mesoamerican structures, with a unique style of its kind that mixes Mayan and Toltec influences mainly, although Rivera himself defined it as an amalgamation of Aztec, Mayan and "Traditional Rivera" styles. The Anahuacalli Museum building is erected with carved volcanic stone, extracted from the same place where it stands. According to the words of the Tabasco museographer and poet Carlos Pellicer, who designed the museum's permanent exhibition at the express indication of Rivera himself, the Anahuacalli responds to the following description:

"It is a personal creation using pre-Hispanic elements, mainly from Toltec architecture and some of the Mayan: sloped walls, serpentine pilasters and rhomboid doors. The pyramidal crown accentuates the magnificent character of the building.

The flat ceilings on the ground floor and the upper floors are decorated with original mosaics by the great painter, which are elements that are integrated into the architecture.

Every year, in compliance with the will that Rivera expressed for the Anahuacalli, contemporary art exhibitions are presented on the premises. These proposals are carefully chosen, as they must alternate harmoniously with the museum's architecture, with the pre-Columbian art on display, with the nature that surrounds it, and with the foundational and evolving concept of Diego's Anahuacalli.

== History of the Anahuacalli ==
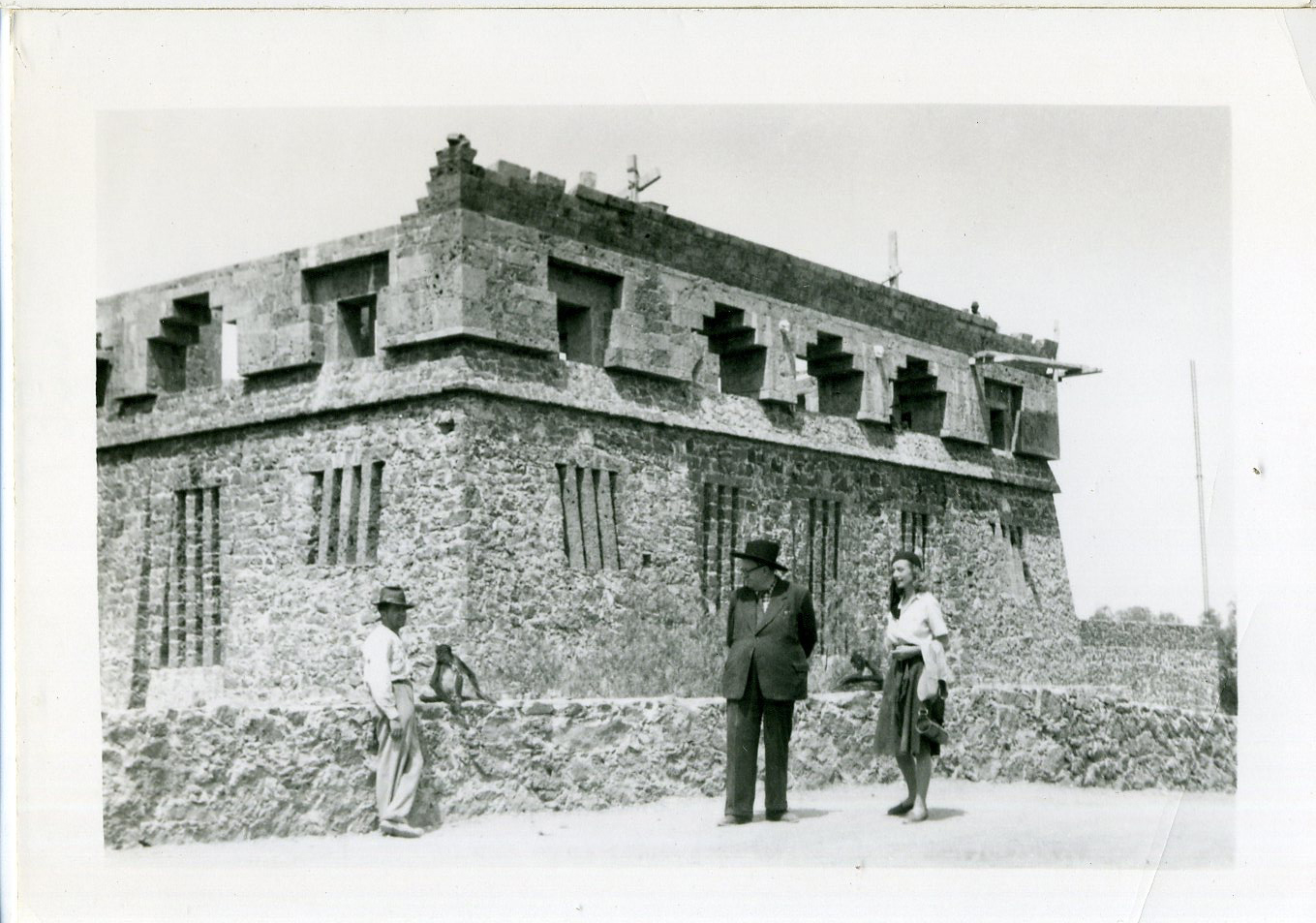
Diego Rivera during the construction of the Anahuacalli

In June, 1940, Diego Rivera painted the mural Pan American Unity for the "Art in Action" program of the Golden Gate International Exposition(GGIE). In this mural painting, the artist shows a clear interest in extolling the pre-Hispanic cultures. After his return to Mexico in 1941, he is willing to begin the construction of a museum that socialises the pre-Columbian aesthetics, both through its architecture and the collection on display. For these purposes, Diego chooses the land that he acquired in the Pedregal de San Ángel to plan his museum and City of the Arts. In the preparatory drafts, a plaza for art and handcart workshops was included, as well as forums dedicated to the performing arts, permanent exhibition halls and a Mexican art museum with nine venues. Rivera expended a considerable amount of his earnings in what would be one of the most ambitious projects of his life: the Anahuacalli.

The Anahuacalli construction began in 1942, in the suburb and town of San Pablo Tepetlapa. A year later, the Mexican artist Frida Kahlo (1907–1954) wrote a letter to the engineer Marte R. Gómez, then Secretary of Agriculture and Development of the government of President Manuel Ávila Camacho, in which she explained her husband's need to build a space that houses his collection. In the words of Frida herself: "(…) after his painting work, what excites him most in his life are his idols (…). His idea was always to build a house for the idols." In said letter, Frida expresses her concern for the sadness of her husband, not having sufficient financial resources to complete the building. As a result, she proposes to the engineer Marte R. Gómez, that the Mexican government supports the continuation of the construction works, with the condition that the muralist donate his collection to Mexico and turn the Anahuacalli into an archaeological museum. Nevertheless, this proposal was not carried out, at least not at the time.

The first museographic design was prepared by Rivera himself under the direction of the anthropologist Alfonso Caso y Andrade (1896–1970). Both Caso and his collaborators recognized Diego's ability to distinguish, in his collection, the most authentic and important components. Despite the essential collaboration of Caso, Pellicer did not organize the exhibition following historical or anthropological criteria while working under the supervision of Rivera. Differently, Pellicer prioritized the artistic quality of the pieces to organize its display, since this had been Rivera's motivation to assemble the collection in the first place. For this reason, none of the objects are shown linked to a museum card, since Rivera's intention does not respond to an archaeological classification, but to an aesthetic admiration.

When master Rivera died, the Anahuacalli was still in its process of construction; hence his daughter, Ruth Rivera (1927–1969) together with the architects Juan O'Gorman (1905–1982) and Heriberto Pagelson, finished this project with the financial support of Dolores Olmedo. Thus, the construction concluded in 1963 and the museum was inaugurated on September 18, 1964. In memory of its creator, the following quote was chosen for the inscription engraved on the museum foundation stone: "I return to the people what I was able to rescue from the artistic heritage of their ancestors. Diego Rivera".

== Anahuacalli's architecture ==
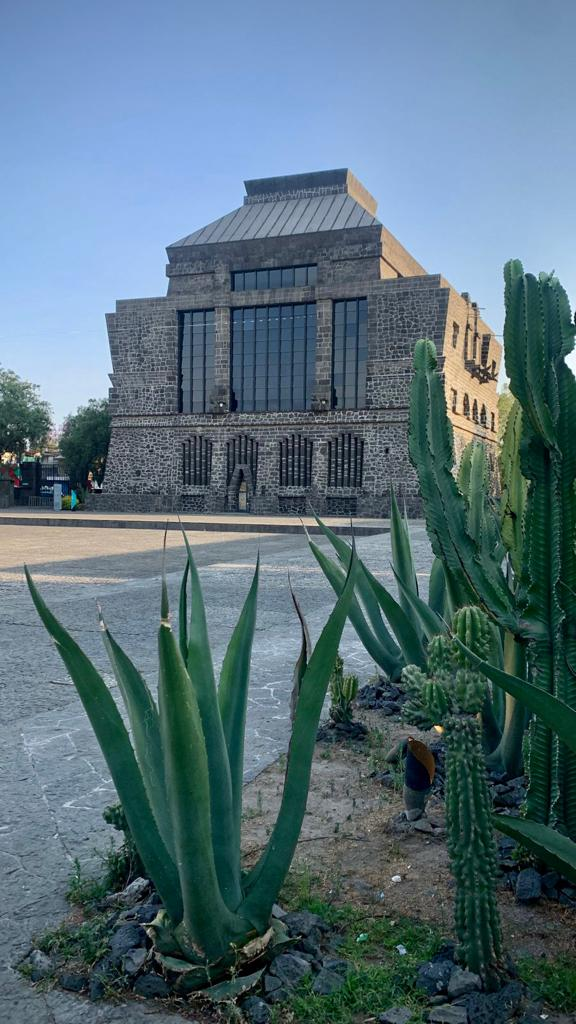
View of the Anahuacalli main building

=== Main building ===
Due to the essential participation of Juan O'Gorman in the Anahuacalli's construction, it has been wrongly assumed that the building possesses an important functionalist influence. Nonetheless, by the 1940s, when the construction of the Anahuacalli began, O'Gorman had already stopped projecting in accordance with said architectural style. Distinctively, the Anahuacalli architecture was as a response to the growing presence of the International Style; O'Gorman realized that his early buildings, influenced by Le Corbusier, were not agreeing with the Mexican landscape and therefore considered them as "invasive species". As a result of the above, O'Gorman sought to return to a Mexican aesthetic for his designs, the one that is characteristic of popular Mexican folk art.

The Anahuacalli responds to the ideal of a construction that is integrated with nature, typical of organic architecture, conceptualized by Frank Lloyd Wright (1867–1959). Lloyd Wright's work influenced that of O'Gorman, as well as the design projected by Rivera for the Anahuacalli, designed to achieve a balance between the pre-Hispanic and the modern. The Mexican architect considered Wright's work as the passage from a "servile veneration of European stupidity" to a confidence in the creative capacity of the American continent.

The Anahuacalli's design is inspired by a teocalli, which means " gods’ house". It is built with volcanic stone from the eruption of the Xitle volcano; these rocks were extracteded from the same land where the museum was built. Its aesthetic includes symbolic and architectural elements that were originated in Mesoamerica. Accordingly, the main building of Anahuacalli is a manifestation of a spatial architectural perception that is characteristic in pre-Hispanic Mesoamerican constructions. The corners of the edifice are dedicated to an element of nature that is represented by original sculptures of their respective deities, according to the Mexica worldview. These divinities are Chicomecóatl (earth), Ehécatl Quetzalcóatl (wind), Tláloc (water), and Huehuetéotl (fire). The building has a total of twenty-three rooms distributed over three levels. In each of the rooms, stand out specific visual motifs of the pre-Hispanic mythology that so fascinated Diego Rivera.

=== Facade ===
The Anahuacalli is made up entirely of carved rock that originated from the eruption of the Xitle volcano. In the lower part of the main building, a platform of this same material protrudes, configuring a kind of "shelf" where pre-Columbian sculptures are installed.

On that same level, we find the access to the museum that consists of an oval arch in front of the arrangement of elongated windows. These windows are made of amber-colored onyx stone, which looks opaque from the outside and translucent from the inside. These thin windows allow the passage of dim natural light; this is a sensible feature considering that the level where these windows are located represents the Underworld.

On the part that is immediately upstairs the access level, the enormous windows that illuminate the interior of the intermediate floor stand out, among which two snake heads can be seen in the lower part of them. Likewise, the trapezoid-shaped roof is observed, reminiscent of ancient Mesoamerican structures.

=== Interior of the building ===
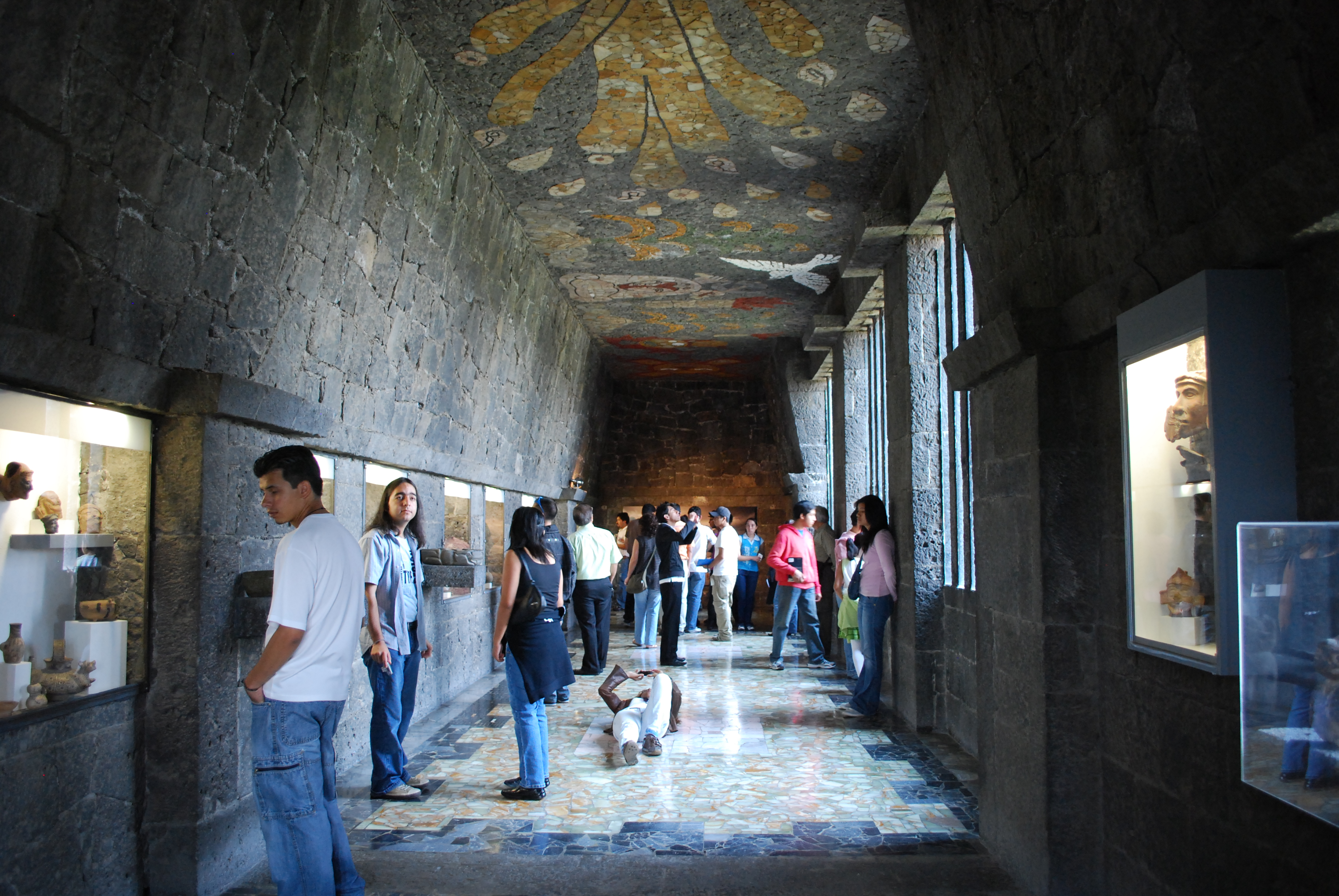
One of the halls on the upper floor of the Anahuacalli Museum in Mexico City.

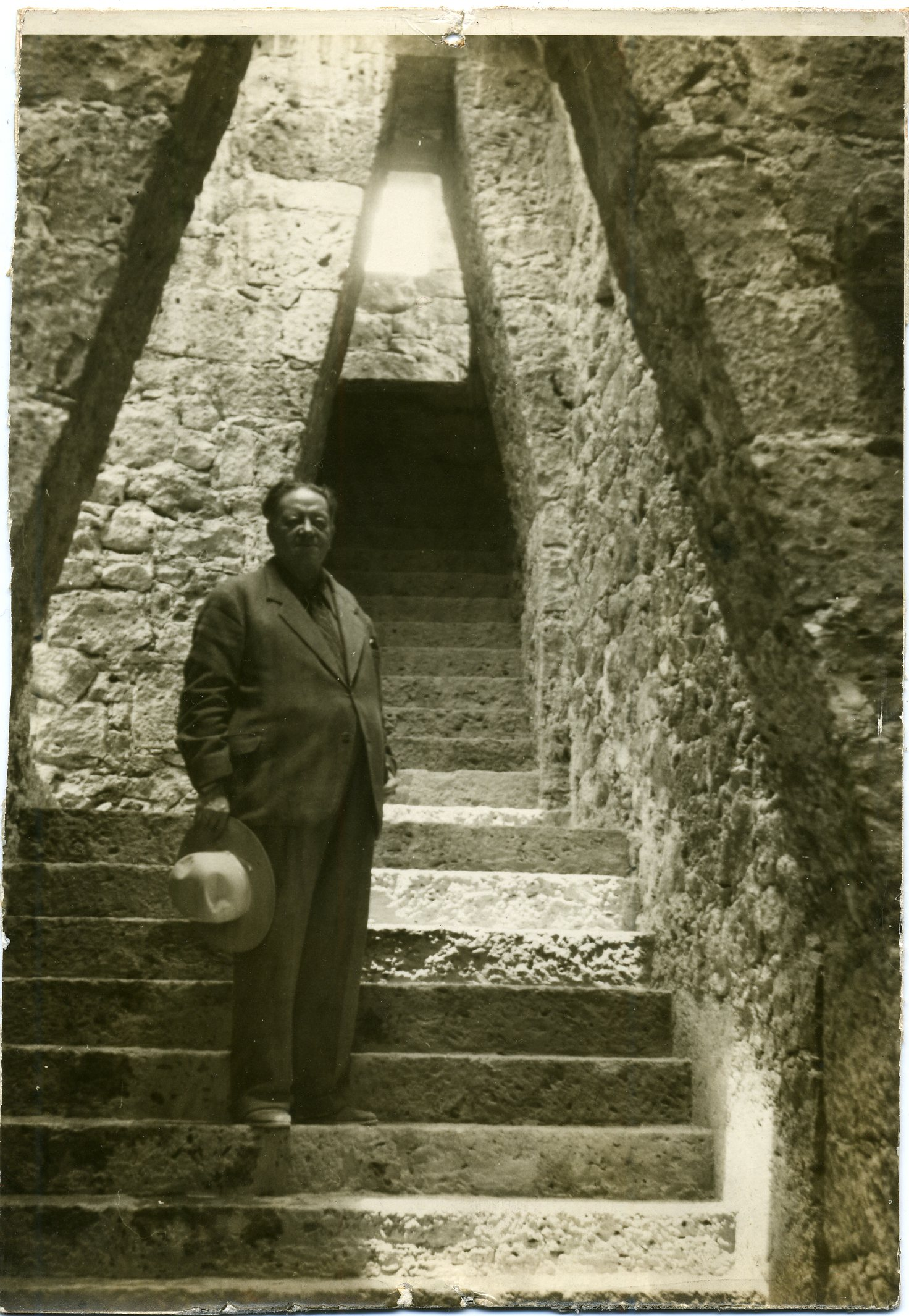
Diego Rivera on the steps of a Maya portal, inside the Anahuacalli

The ground floor of the Anahuacalli stands out for its complexity; it is made up of walls of different thickness depending on their function. The walls that are thicker, have a load-bearing structure of reinforced concrete inside. The four vertices were preserved as "chambers", where the contemporary and museographic altars are beautifully placed, alluding to those that served to worship deities in pre-Columbian Mesoamerican contexts. Since this section represents the Underworld, it doesn't have much lighting.

On the first floor that is also the middle floor, the four vertices were kept as "crypts" and there are four exhibition halls. Among these rooms, the two smaller ones face south, and the larger ones are longitudinal, one being clearly more integrated into the central space. On that same level is the space known as Diego Rivera's Studio. This section represents the earthly world, so its rooms are endowed with natural light, unlike the lower floor.

After finishing the spaces mentioned above, the roof was built. The design of the second level forms a "U". In this area, the "crypts" were integrated into the longitudinal rooms, while the small rooms remained, repeating the layout of the lower ones.

Although O'Gorman was determined to respect the scheme proposed by Rivera, this was not entirely possible in the case of the roof, since Diego had planned it with a singular lightness. This is demonstrated by two letters mentioned in this regard by the architect Ruth Rivera, Diego's daughter, and by Pedro Alvarado, one of the muralist's grandchildren. In these letters, Rivera highlighted: "the importance of Ajusco for the solution of his project" and how the roof should "rhyme with the nose of Pico del Águila", due to its slender design.

Rivera thought of a "light crowning", since "the truncated pyramid" must have "a new body that gives the building a vertical character", which contrasts "with the horizontal character achieved by the building as well as with its surrounding landscape". For the actual technical solution, he thought of a metallic profile drowned in concrete and "the inclined-vertical plane of light sheets of thin marble or tecali, the ceiling itself of pre-cast concrete sheets…or else cast on site with the same procedure." Finally, Diego wanted the roof to end in a lightning rod. The painter also suggested placing a palapa to cover the structure of the rubble.

Due to important decisions regarding costs, as well as for assuring the durability and the stability of the construction, Juan O'Gorman's final solution could not fully adhere to Diego's guidelines. Consequently, the upper part of the building turned out to be somewhat heavy, rigid and not very flexible, compared to the original idea.

=== Mosaics ===
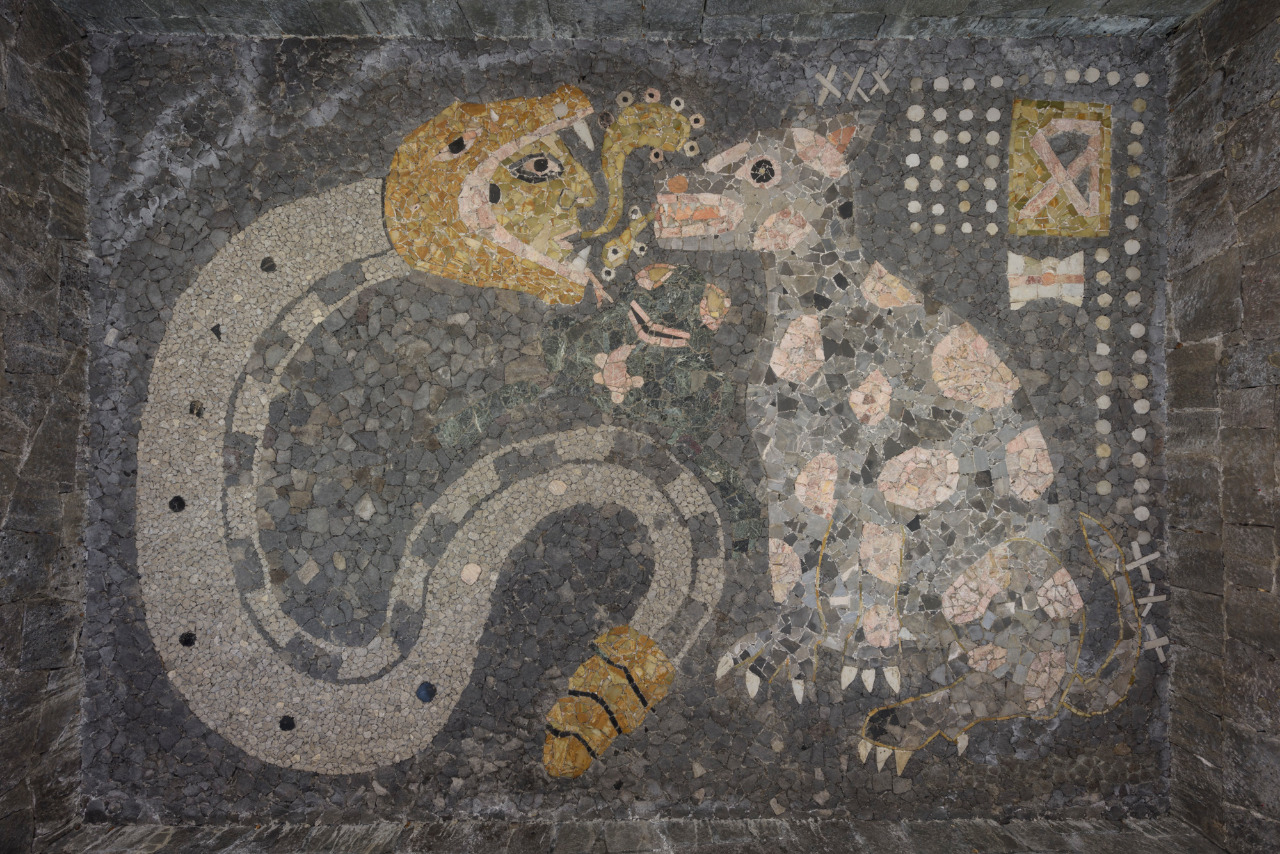
Cast mosaic

Both Rivera and O'Gorman carried out technical and aesthetic experiments for the decorative endings inside the Anahuacalli, using the cast mosaic technique, which consists of:

"Place some cardboard with the drawn sketches directly on the wooden formwork. On these cardboards, with a glue emulsion, the pieces of stone were adhered following the image that the painter had created. Later, it was completed with the mortar stone to fix it. When all this dried up, the formwork and the cardboard were removed, and the image was corrected".

The first attempts were not satisfactory, hence when a definitive solution was reached, the first slabs were demolished. Initially, the roof of the ground floor had skylights, which had to be sealed because the artist was unable to solve the passage of light without the use of vitroblock to give firmness to the floor of the next level. The complexity of the mosaics varies depending on the museum levels. While the designs of the ground floor mosaics are monochromatic, the mosaics on the upper sections were made with stones of different colors.

In the windows, stones were placed in vertical cuts that simulated a fine rhythm that closed the large windows without horizontal lintels, but rather angular ones. The decision was to use a tecali stone in slabs as thin as they are translucent and thus achieve a tie with the stone.

=== Outdoor spaces ===
The total extension of the land of the Anahuacalli Museum is sixty thousand square meters, in which Diego Rivera designed the museum building and conceived a City of Arts; a space for artistic creation and feedback, where architecture, painting, dance, music, sculpture, theater, crafts and ecology coexist. In the center of the place, we find a large esplanade or central square, where various artistic events are frequently held.

Located to one side of the main building is the Diego Rivera gallery, a space for high-quality temporary exhibitions. Another fundamental place in this enclosure is the Sapo-Rana art library, which houses the collection of 2400 copies from the personal library of the anthropologist Eulalia Guzmán, who donated them to the Anahuacalli Museum in the 1950s. This library also has valuable art books, available to be consulted in the room. In 2021, a remodeling of this library was inaugurated, within the framework of the project "Remodeling and Construction of New Spaces of the Anahuacalli Museum". This intervention turned the Library into a multidisciplinary place, endowed with an interior architecture that enjoys a modern and functional design, which enables it to exhibit contemporary art installations and artworks of all kinds, as well as being a suitable room for conferences and talks.

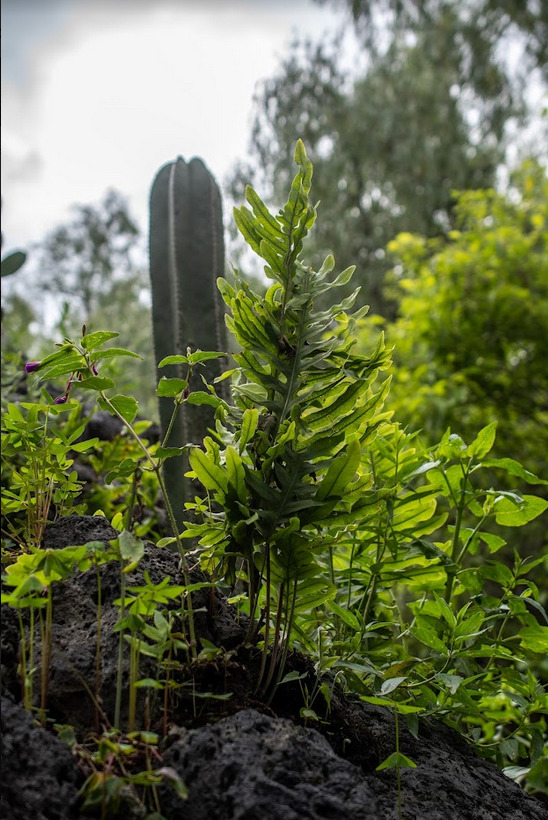
Anahuacalli Ecological Reserve

=== Ecological reserve ===
The land where the Anahuacalli was built appeared approximately 2000 years ago with the eruption of the Xitlevolcano, which produced a lava spill that, over time, became what is now the Pedregal de San Ángel. Although the explosion devastated the landscape of the Valley of Mexico, affecting forests and lakes, a new ecosystem emerged from the volcanic rock, which has been the object of inspiration for renowned artists such as Dr. Atl and the architect Luis Barragán.

Though it is believed that the main reason why Diego Rivera chose the San Pablo Tepetlapa rocky area to erect his Temple of the Arts was the availability of materials for the construction of his building there, it is not ruled out that Rivera could also have inherited the interest in Mexican flora and fauna from one of his teachers: the painter José María Velasco. Velasco's work is not only concentrated on landscape painting, but also ventured into the field of scientific illustration. In addition, it is likely that the foregoing influenced Diego's preference for using plants typical of semi-arid regions and xerophytic scrub, as opposed to the trends of the time that showed a clear preference for gardens with European aesthetics and botanical composition.

In 1949, Rivera published his text "Requirements for the organization of El Pedregal" in the newspaper Novedades. In this article, he outlined the advantages of rocky terrain for building houses. In said document, he speaks of the Pedregal as a possible site for the creation of a new city, since it did not present the climate and economic complications belonging to the older regions of Mexico City, where the soil was spongier. On the other hand, one of Diego's greatest concerns was the preservation of the natural landscape; accordingly he drafted a series of specifications so as not to damage the ecosystem during the works. The artist considered that the lava had to be protected, since it endowed the territory with its unique beauty. Rivera sought to preserve this same lava attribute, in what is now the Ecological Reserve of Anahuacalli.

The Anahuacalli Museum is the only museum in Mexico that has an ecological zone of 28000 square meters that remains in a wild state and has water outcrops that enrich the beauty of the landscape. This green area protects flora and fauna typical of the volcanic soil of the place, as well as orchids, edible and medicinal herbs, Begonia del Pedregal and shrubs that are not found in any other green area in Mexico. This ecological reserve can be contemplated with a panoramic view from the roof of the museum. Also, it can be visited through guided tours on Saturdays and Sundays.

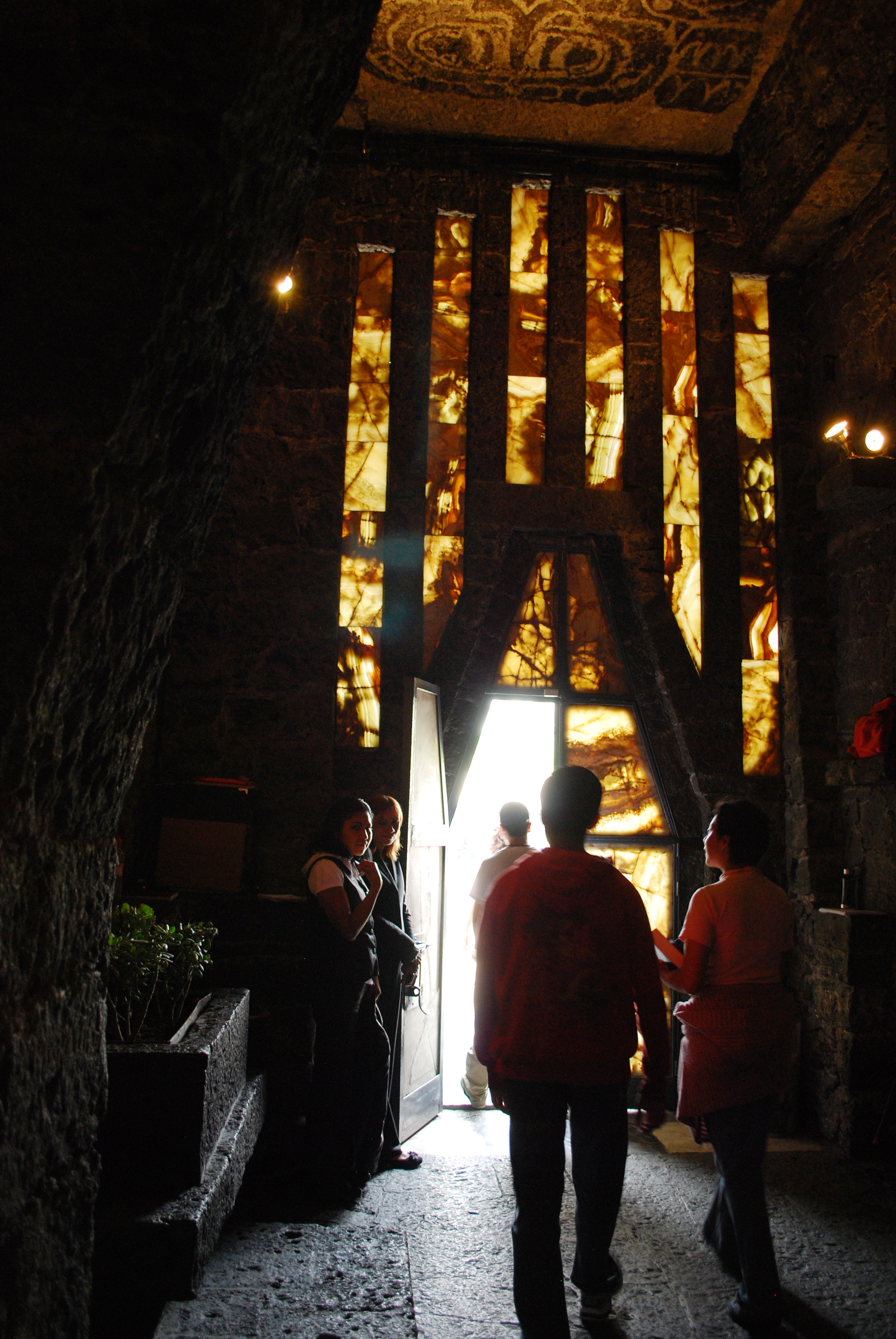
Entrance Area

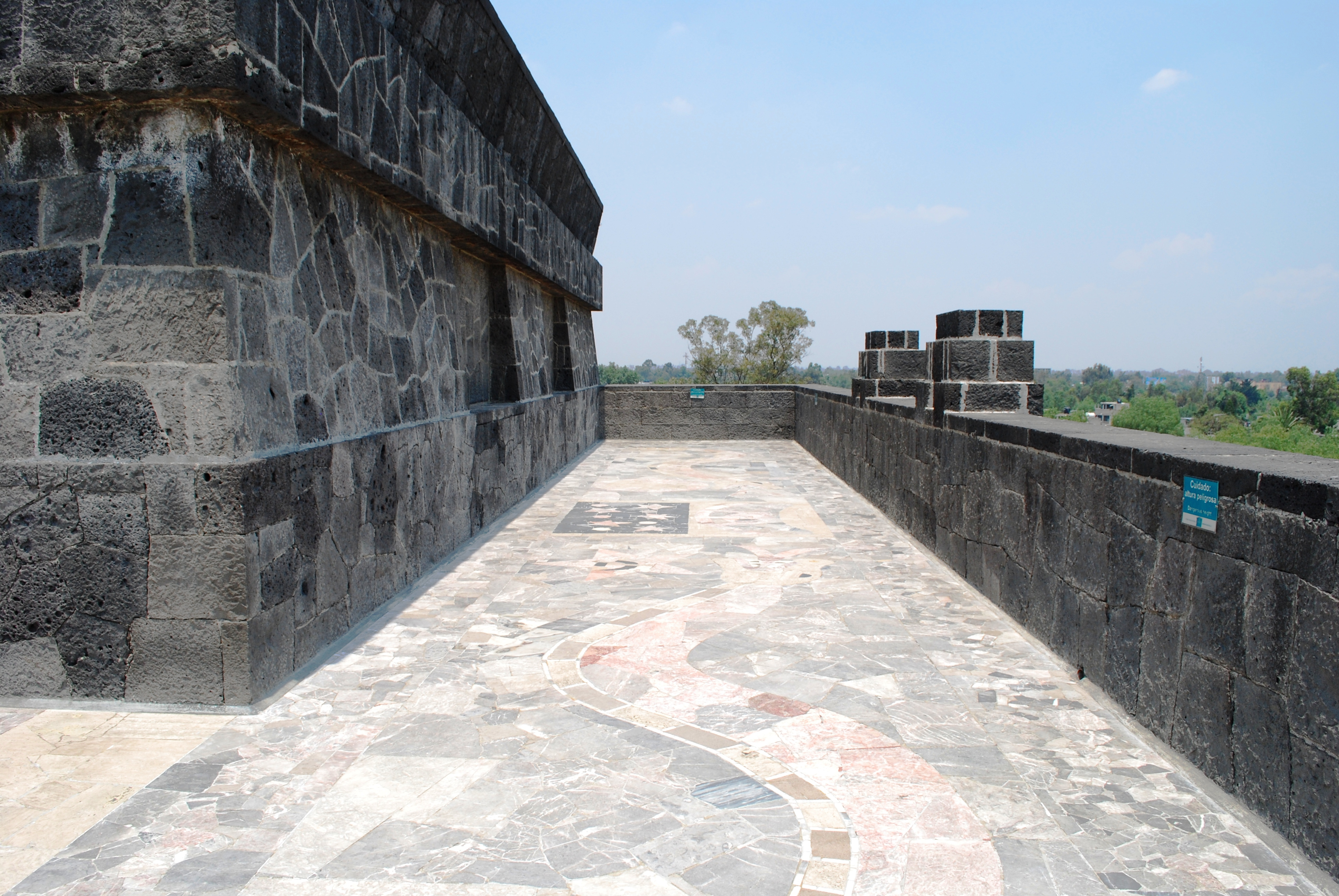
Roof Terrace

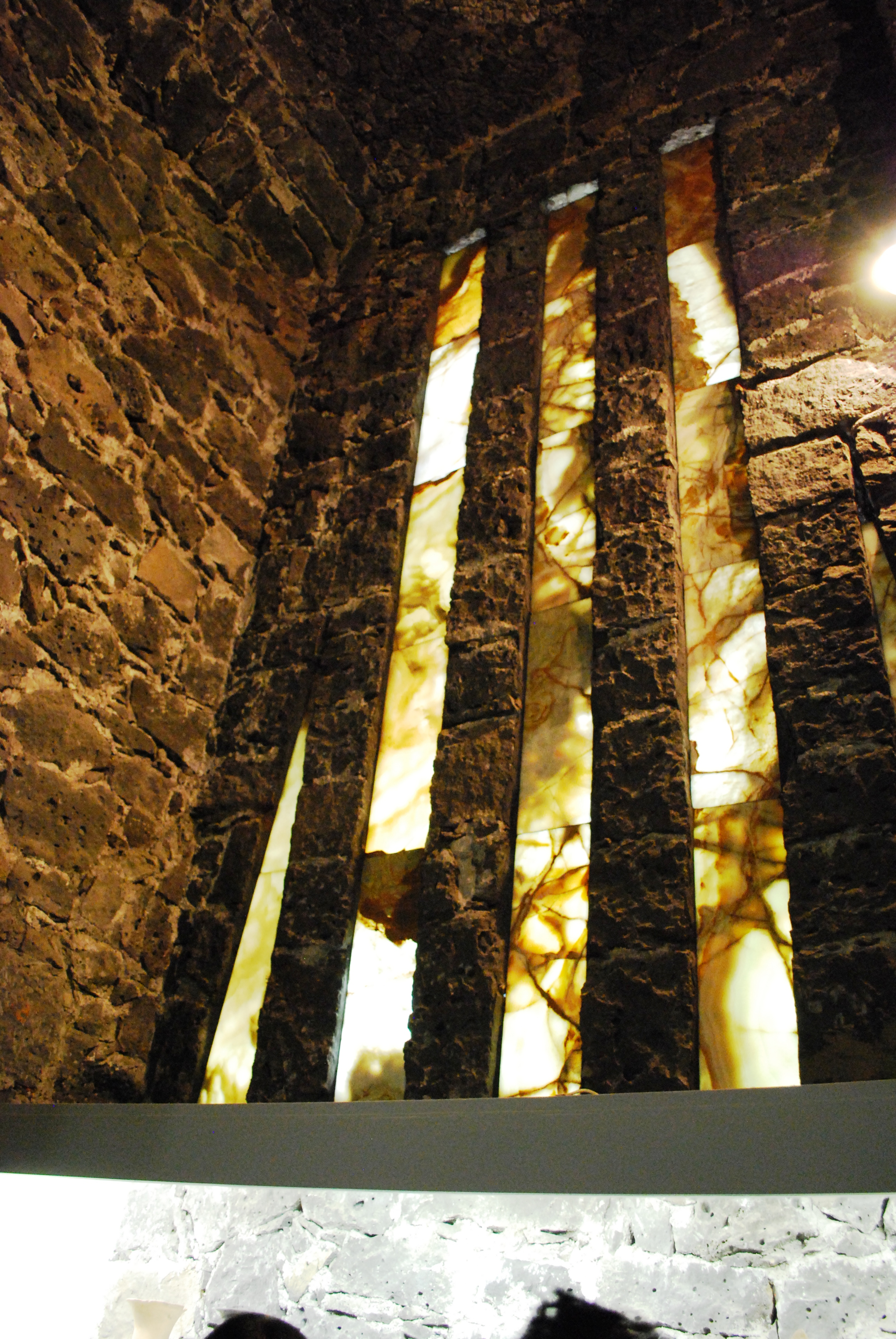
Window

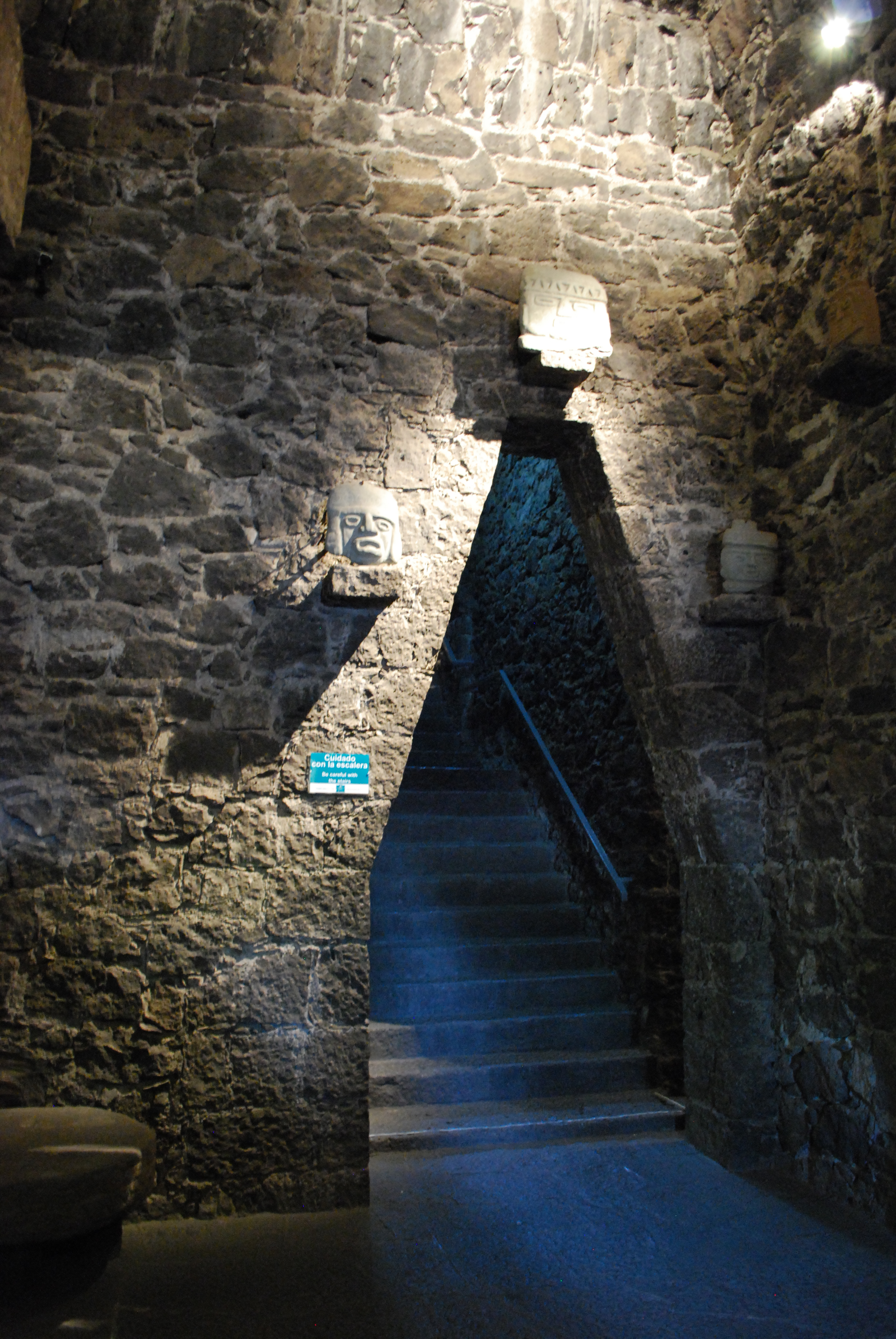
Entrance to the Stairwell

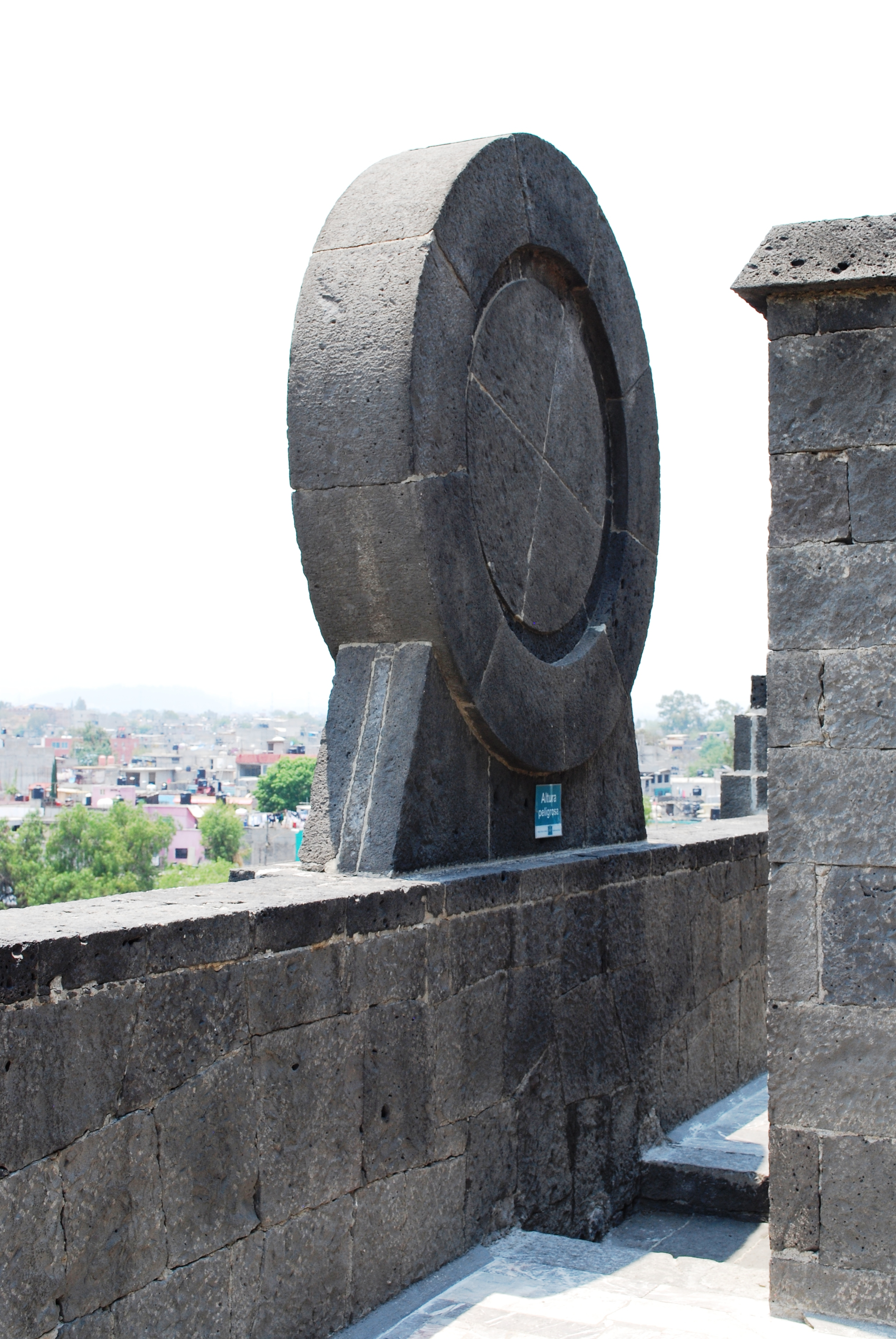
Solar Disk at the Museum Building

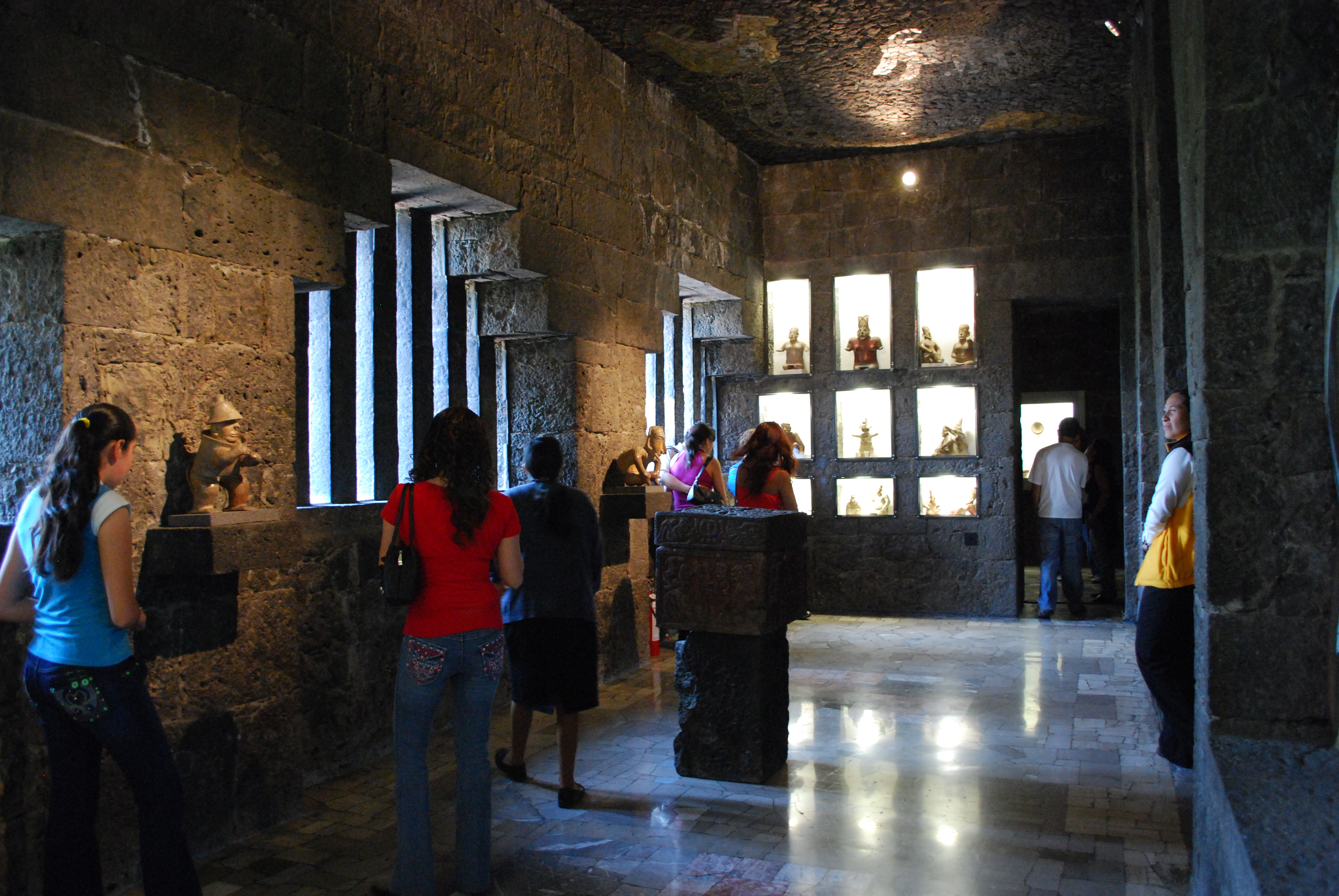
Lobby

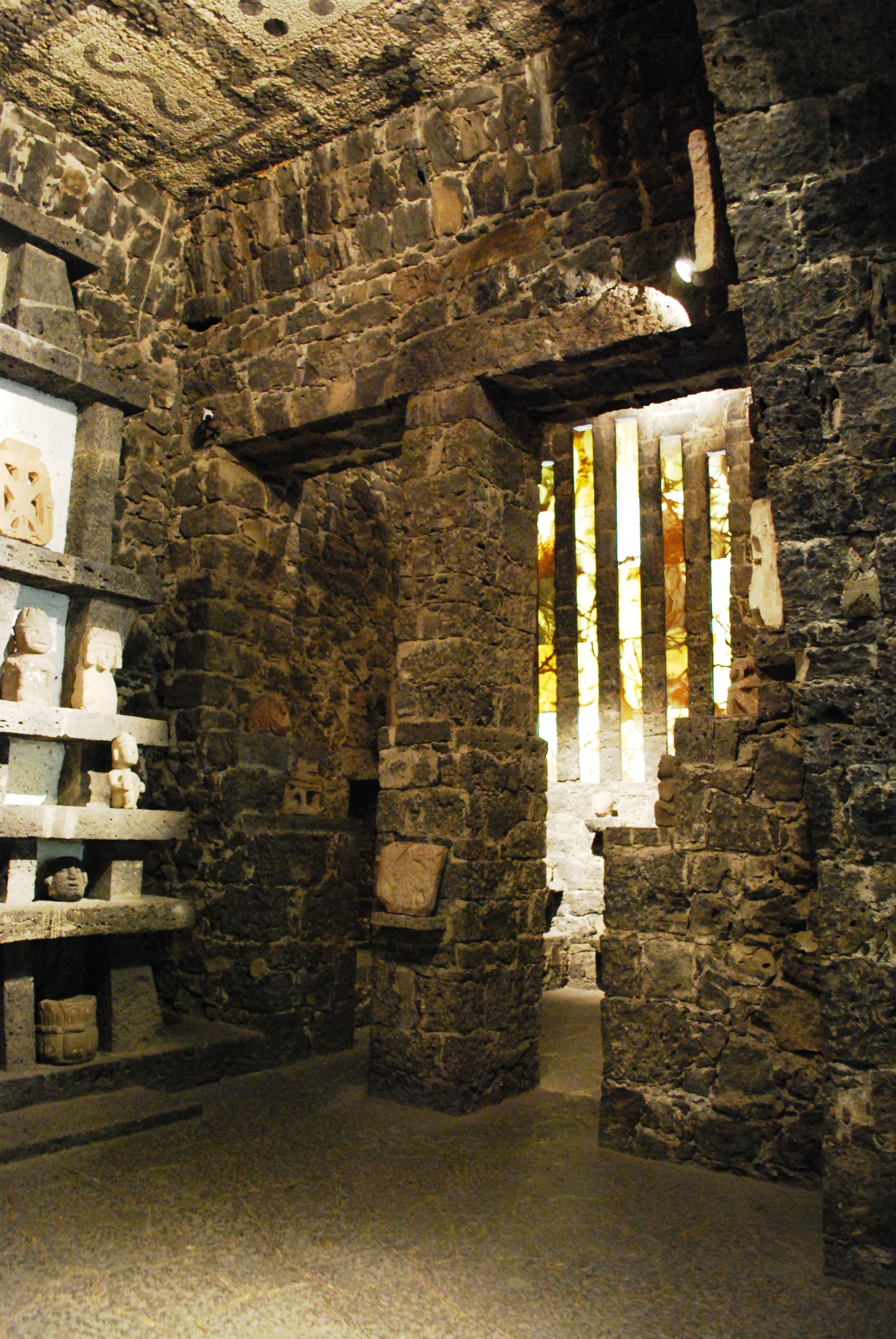
Exposure Share

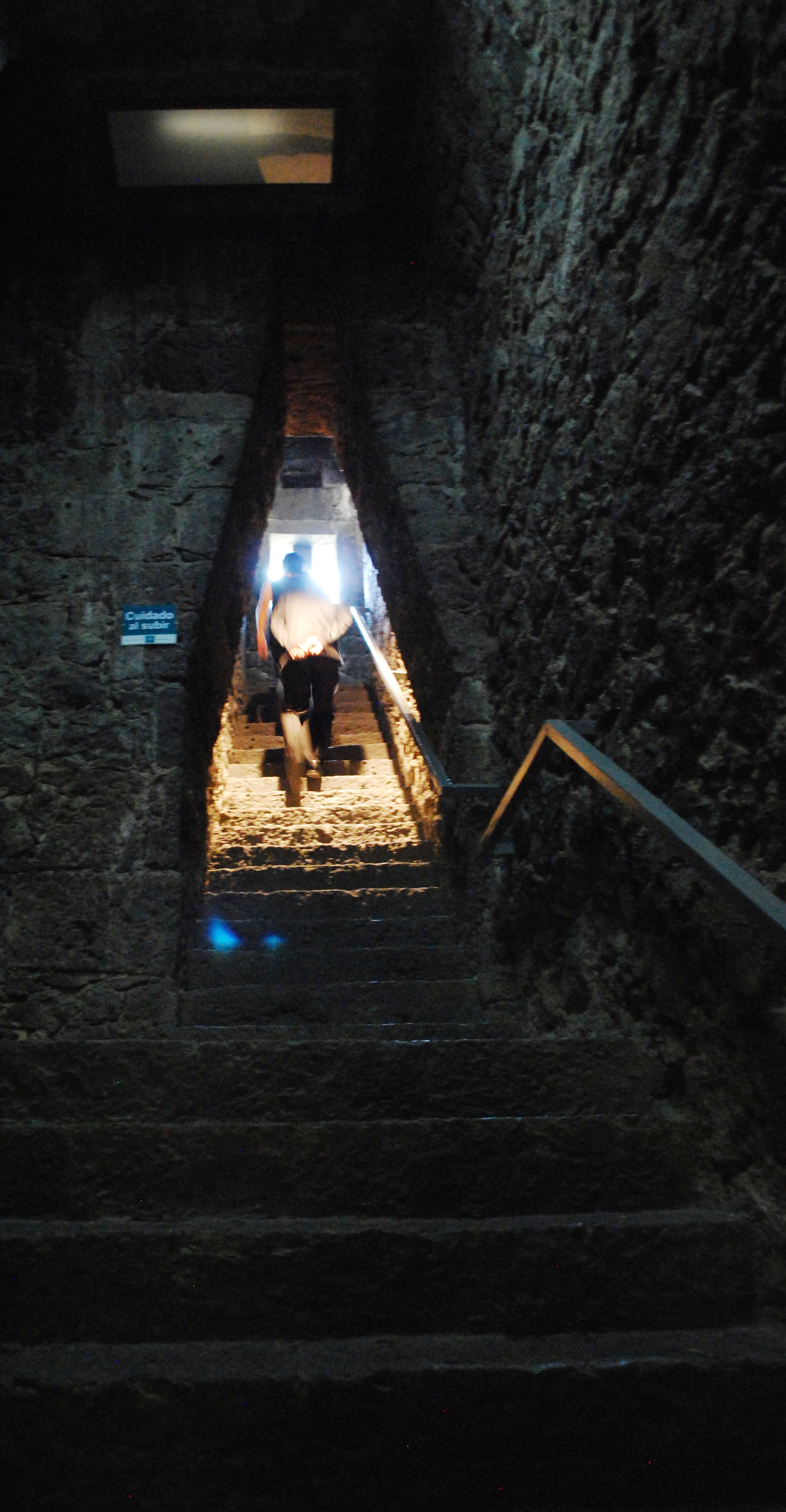
Museum Stairs

== Pre-columbian art collection ==
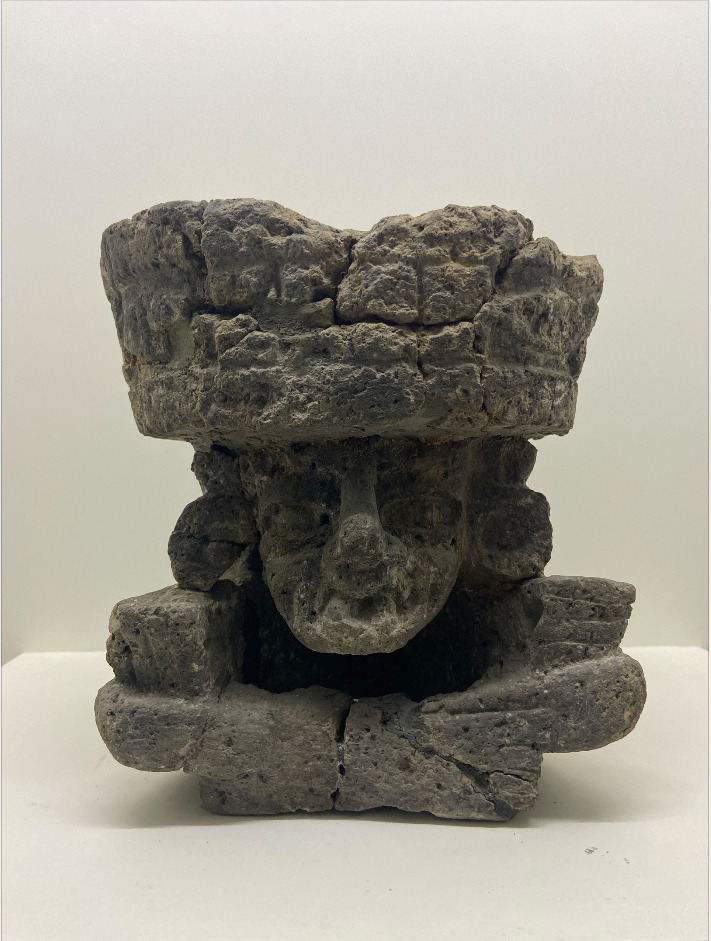
Fire God sculpture

Diego Rivera (1886–1957) began collecting pre-Columbian art in his childhood. In 1906, he had to leave this first collection under the care of his mother, when he went to live and work in Europe. Upon his return in 1921, he was forced to restart his collection because his mum told him that she had to sell it due to economic problems. That same year, Rivera restarted the gradual acquisition of the pre-Columbian artworks that are currently exhibited at the Anahuacalli.

Since the 1930s, Diego had the intention of depositing his collection in a specific place, designed according to his ideas. At that time, the muralist was already collaborating with the cultural authorities of the government in turn. In 1934, once the Palace of Fine Arts was completed, the Escultura Mexicana Antigua (Ancient Mexican Sculpture exhibition) was held. Maestro Rivera collaborated with this exhibition, contributing twelve pieces of the one hundred and thirty-nine works that composed this exhibition.

Juan Coronel Rivera, historian, writer and grandson of the painter, declares: "When the collection was very incipient, around 1934, he actually had very selected pieces; each one of them he placed on a base. Later, when the quantity was overwhelming, when it went up to 30,000 pieces, he just placed them where they fit". By the year of his death, in 1957, master Rivera had more than 40,000 pieces collected. Dolores Olmedo (1908–2002), Rivera's former patron, counted 59,400 pieces.

Diego Rivera's interest in the pre-Hispanic past coincides with the years in which nationalist thinking was formed as a result of the Mexican Revolution. Like his contemporaries, he did not only value the remains of pre-Columbian cultures, but also considered the pieces from Tlatilco, Teotihuacán and Western Mexico as foundational works of Mexican aesthetics. The painter saw in the enlargement of his collection much more than a hobby; his purpose was to rescue and preserve the pre-Columbian heritage for a better understanding of Mexican art development. His fascination with stone figures and ceramic pieces became an inspiration for his artworks. A clear example of this is the figure of Xochipilli, the Lord of the Flowers, whose image Rivera illustrated in the mural paintings located in the stairs of the Secretariat of Public Education (Secretaría de Educación Pública, SEP). This drawing, in archaeological terms, is possibly the most accurate pictorial representation of an Aztec deity.

It is known that the artist's fondness for collecting instigated an economic and familiar problem at the time. Mexican novelist and model Guadalupe Marín, Diego's wife for a time, was particularly upset by her husband's insistence on buying idols, regardless of his household expenses. This is demonstrated in a narration published in 1964 in the cultural newspaper El Gallo Ilustrado:

"Go away, I tell you to take your tepalcates and leave my husband alone. Just see what Rivera does to me: he buys those mannequins and then he doesn't care that we don't even have enough money to eat. Surely the few cents that were for today's expense, this chacharero takes them".

Regarding the nature of his collection, Rivera did not want it to be a scientific sampler, but instead sought to return the pieces their Mana, which in the words of the anthropologist, historian and philosopher Mircea Eliade (Bucharest, 1907 –Chicago, 1986) is:

"(…) the mysterious and active force possessed by certain individuals, generally the souls of the dead and all spirits (…). It is a force different from the physical forces from a qualitative point of view, that is why it is exerted in an arbitrary way. A good warrior owes that quality not to his own strength or resources, but to the strength that a dead warrior's mana gives him. That mana is found in the small stone amulet that hangs around his neck."

Diego Rivera aimed to rescue the ritual character of the pieces in his collection; that divine essence that they possessed at the time they were used and that endowed them with their real value. In an interview with the painter, the American journalist Betty Ross commented that "The master affectionately touched a stone figure, which probably dated back thousands of years (…) he introduced me to Centéotl, a corn goddess, near whom Tlaloc was sitting, god of the waters (...)". The foregoing demonstrates the great veneration that Diego Rivera had towards his pre-Hispanic artworks, as well as the appropriate manner he approached them. It is worth mentioning that the painter, together with Manuel Gamio, participated in esoteric ceremonies at the top of the Pyramid of the Sun, since both of them formed part of the Rosicrucian lodge "Quetzalcóatl".

Those spiritual practices could explain that the Mexican State thinkers saw in the ancient monoliths the power to reinvent the national culture. In short, these artifacts were perceived as both means of spiritual connection as well as tools for asserting high political status.

In 1950, the then director of the National Museum of Anthropology, Daniel Rubín de la Borbolla Cedillo (1907–1990), carried out a project in collaboration with the Directorate of Primary Night Education. The initiative consisted of a traveling exhibition of pre-Columbian art, which should allow students to appreciate an enhanced graphic panorama of pre-Hispanic life. Pieces from the Diego Rivera's collection formed part of this educational art show.

Currently, the Anahuacalli Museum houses an estimated 39,000 pre-Hispanic pieces that Master Rivera collected throughout his life. From these numerous artistic heritages, a selection of the 2000 most representative pieces is permanently on display to the public. According to Pellicer: "The extraordinary richness of the collection allowed the organizer of the museum to create scenes of the public and private life of those people. All these niches, are truly amazing". The remaining 37,000 pieces are preserved in the building called Bodega de Colecciones (Collections Storage).

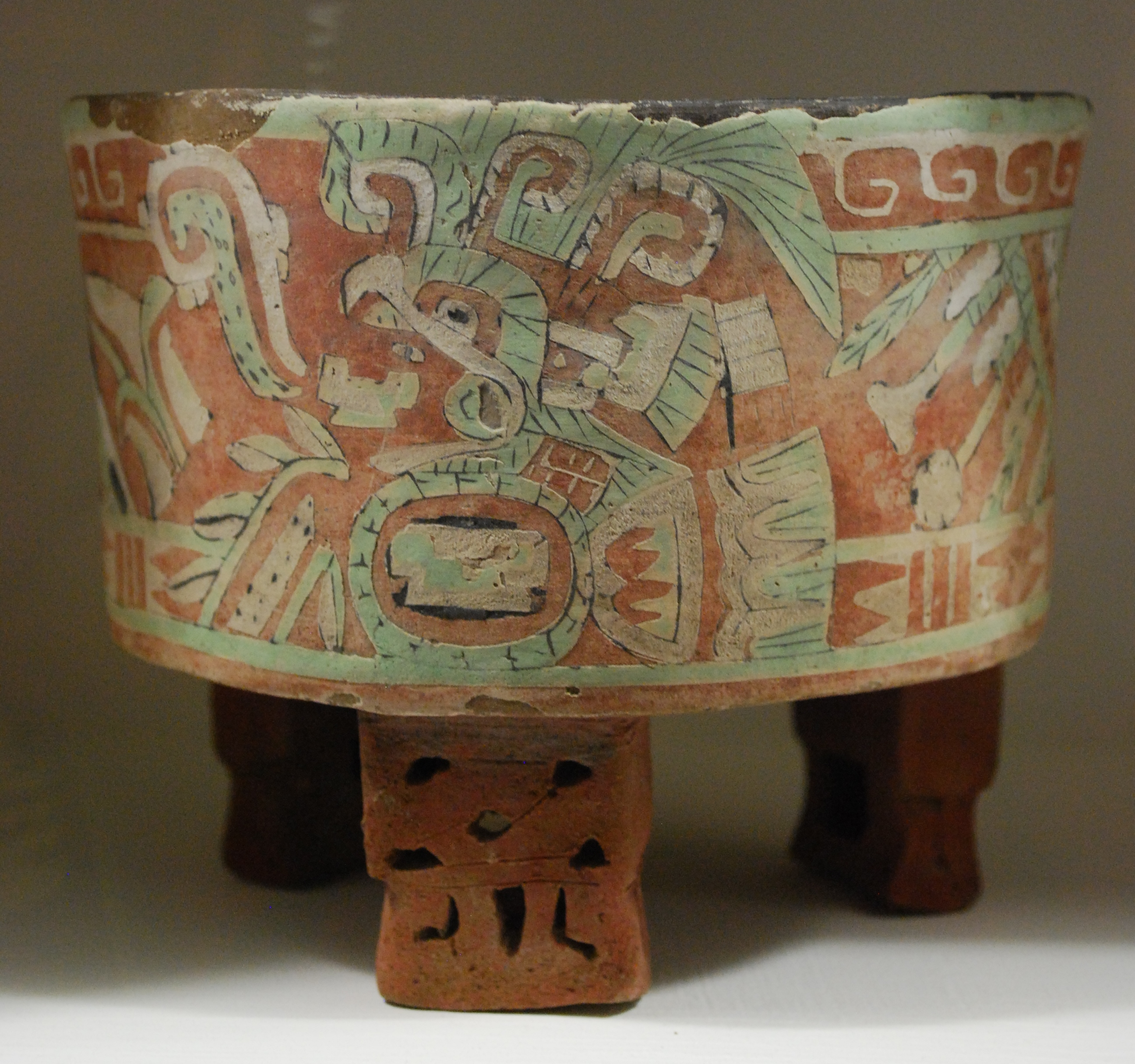
Closeup of a Colored Ceramics Piece

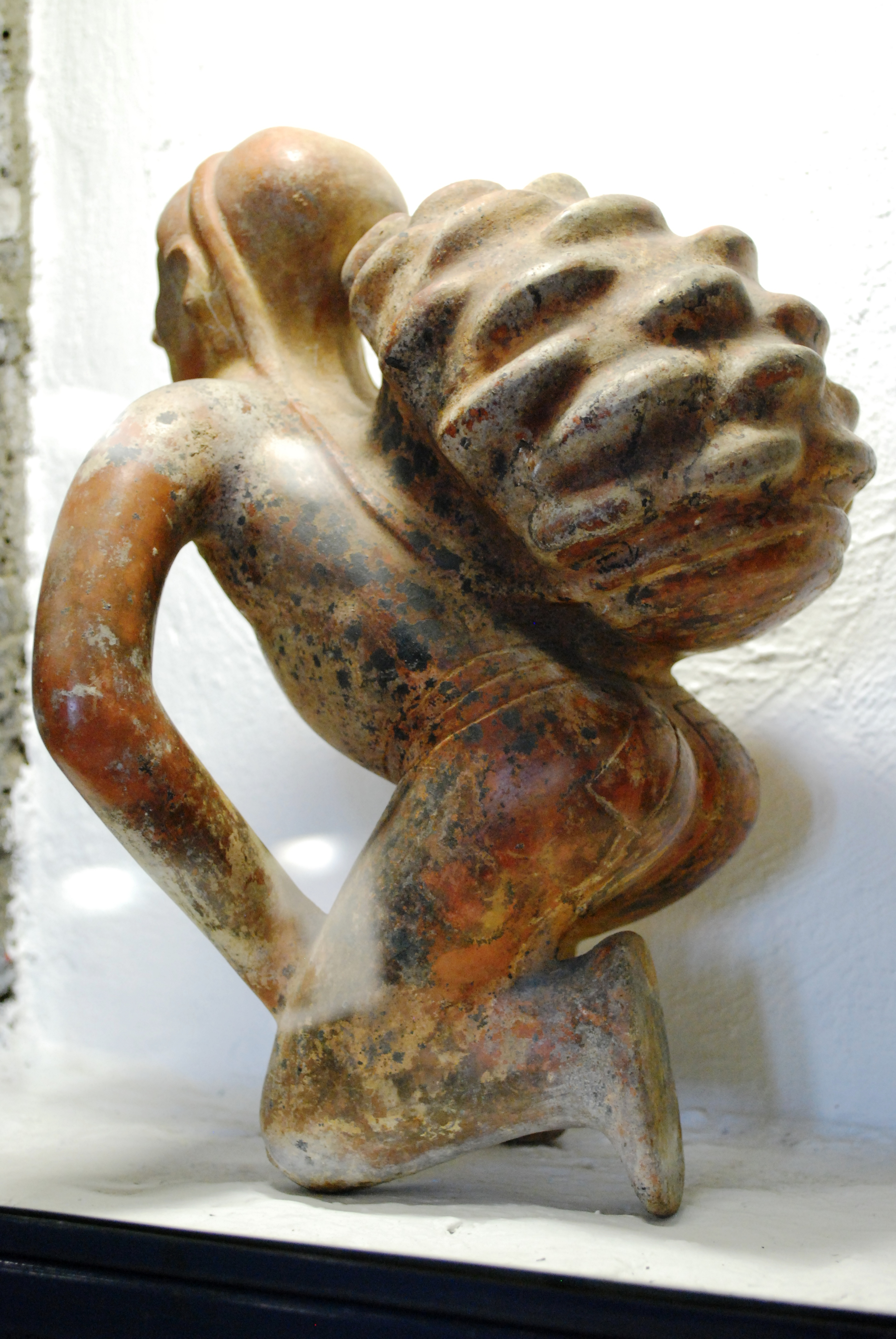
Ceramic Sculpture of Person with Load on his Back

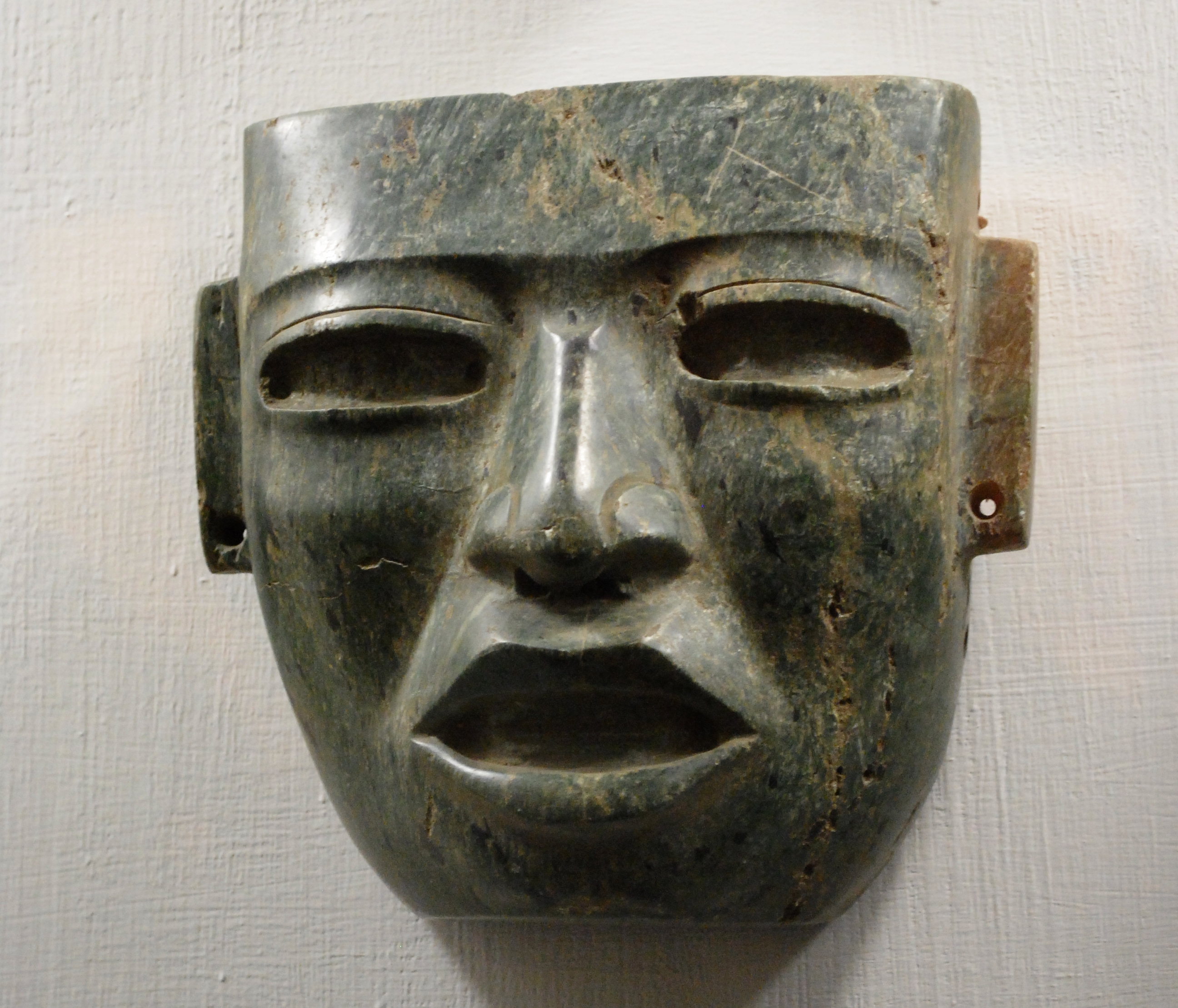
Death Mask of Jade

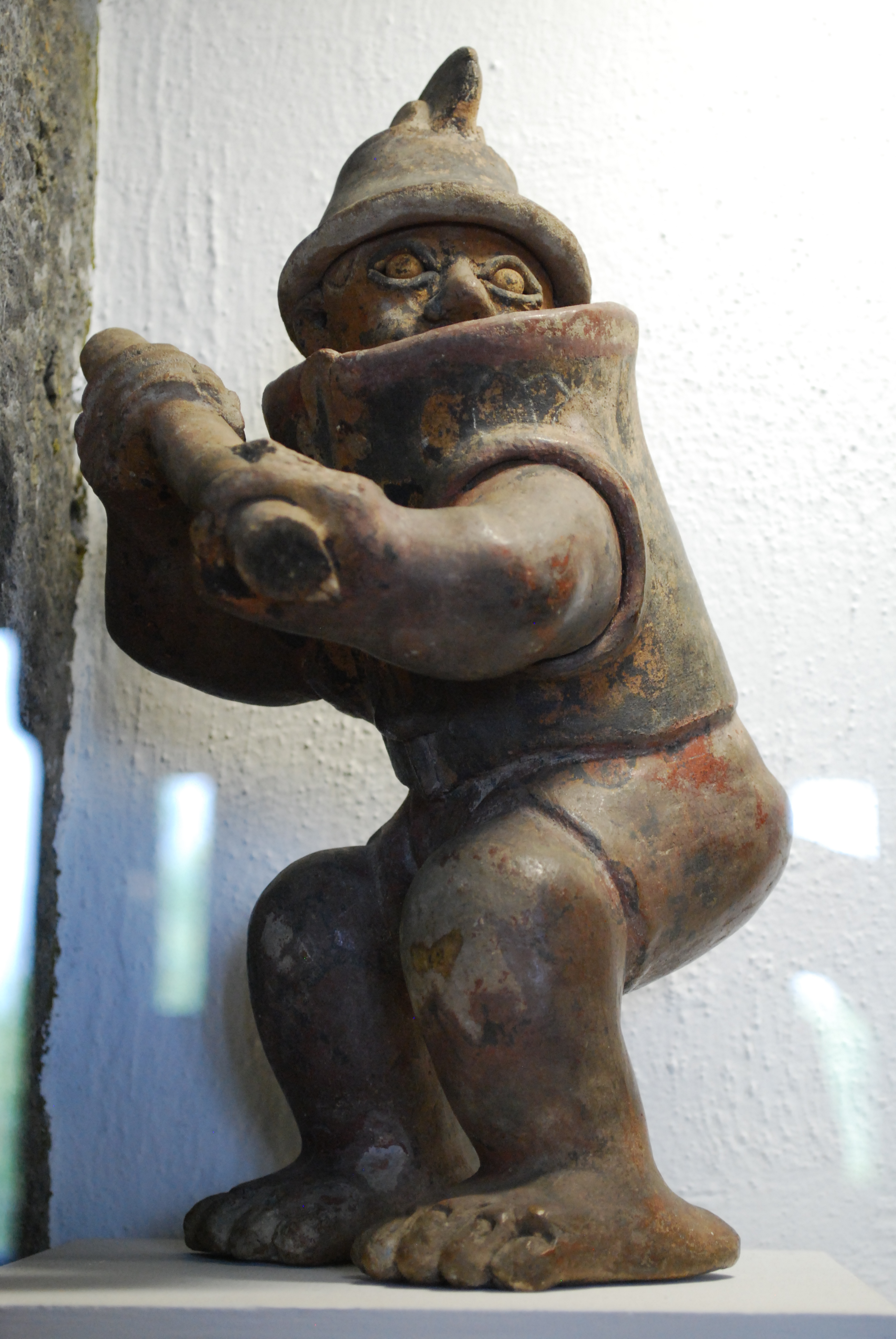
Ceramic Figurine

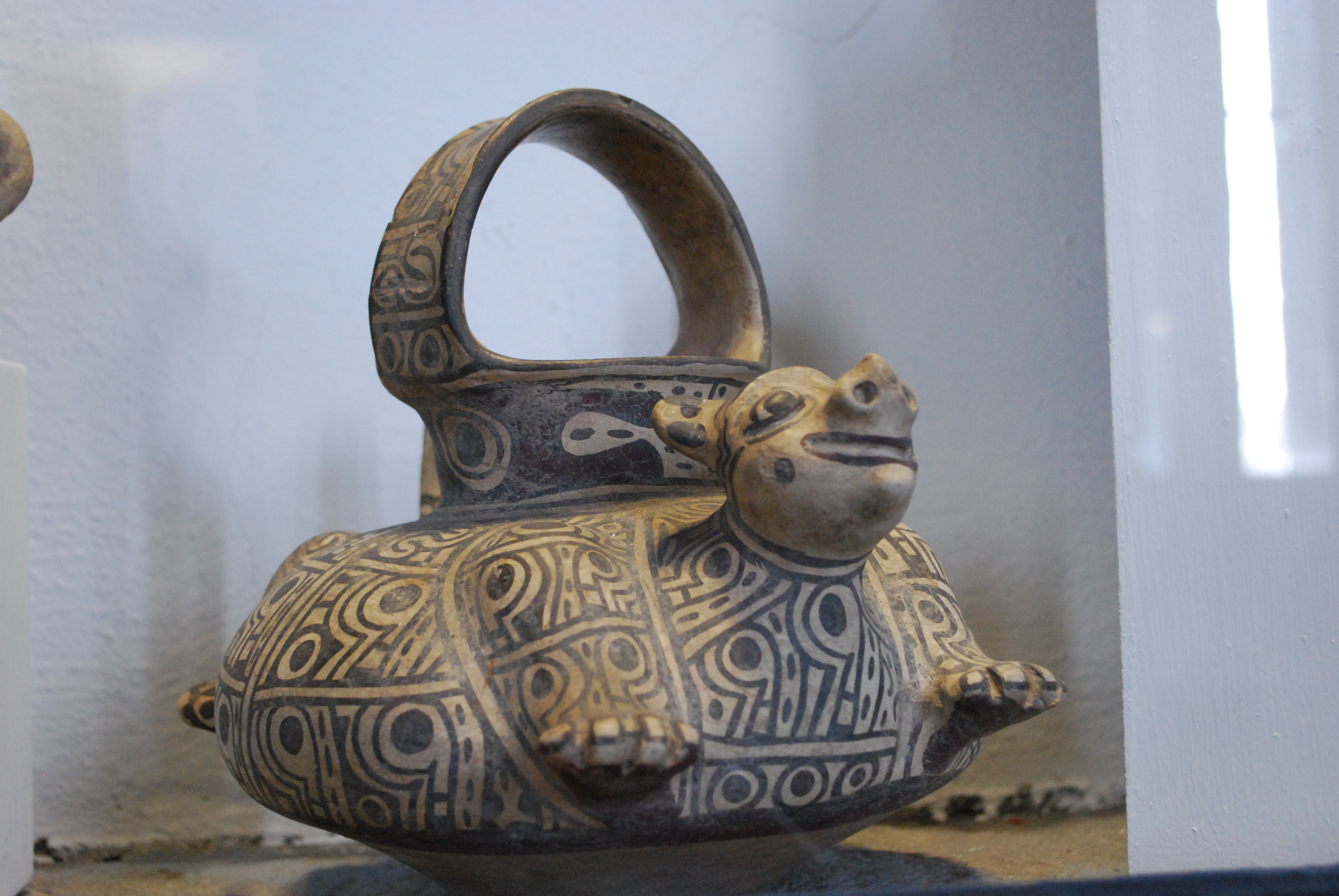
Ceramic Vessel with Animal Form

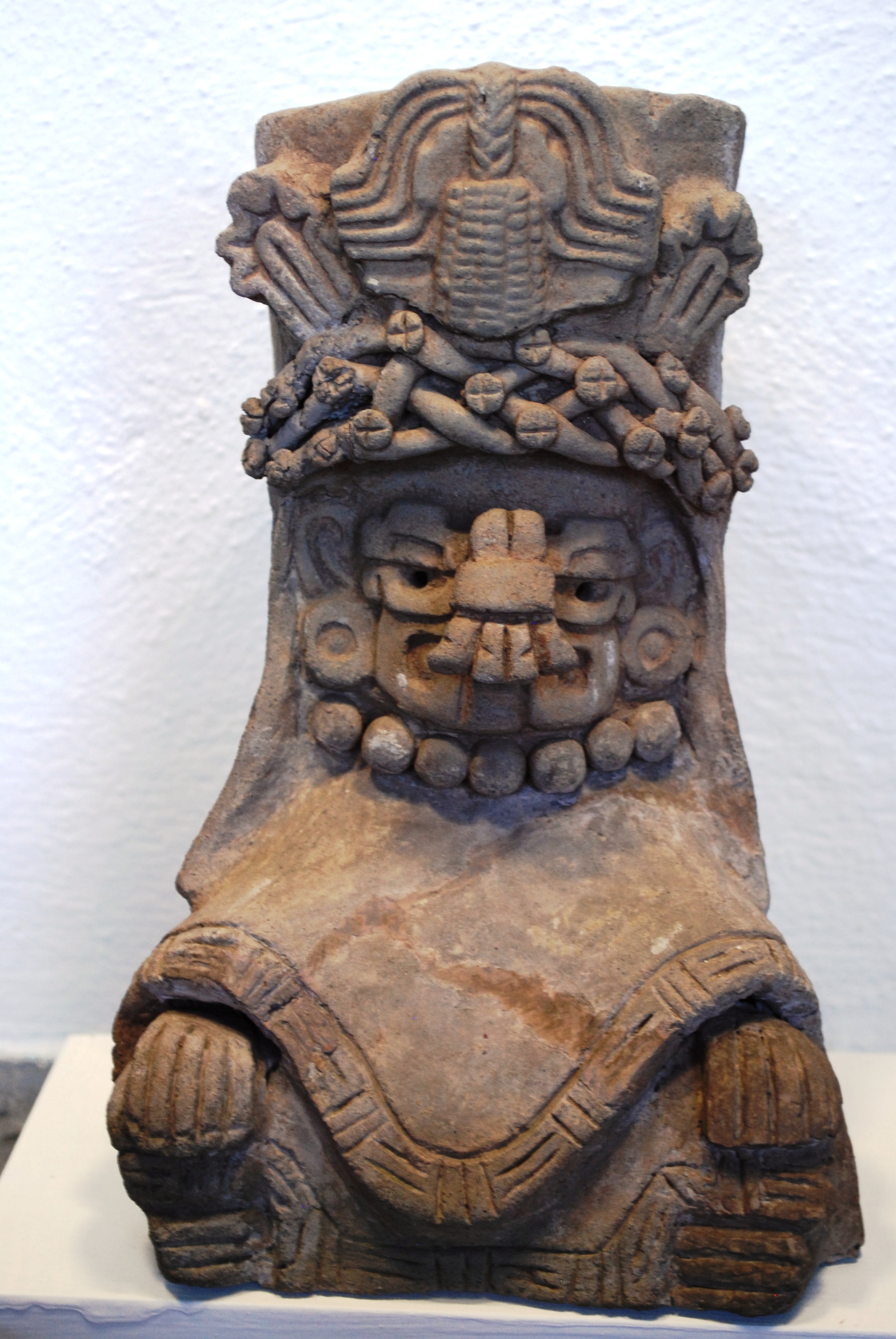
Ceramic Piece

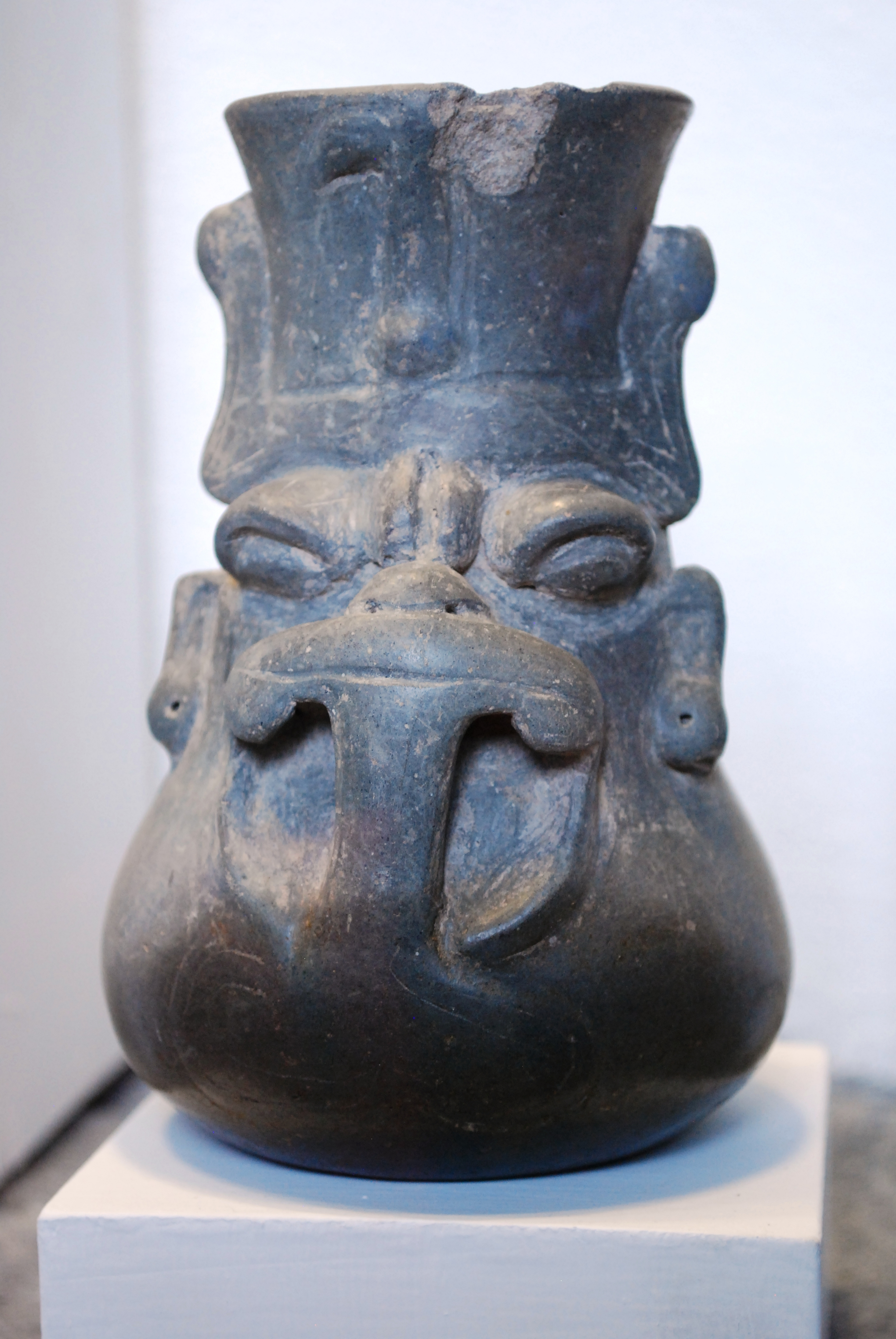
Ceramic Vessel with Distorted Face

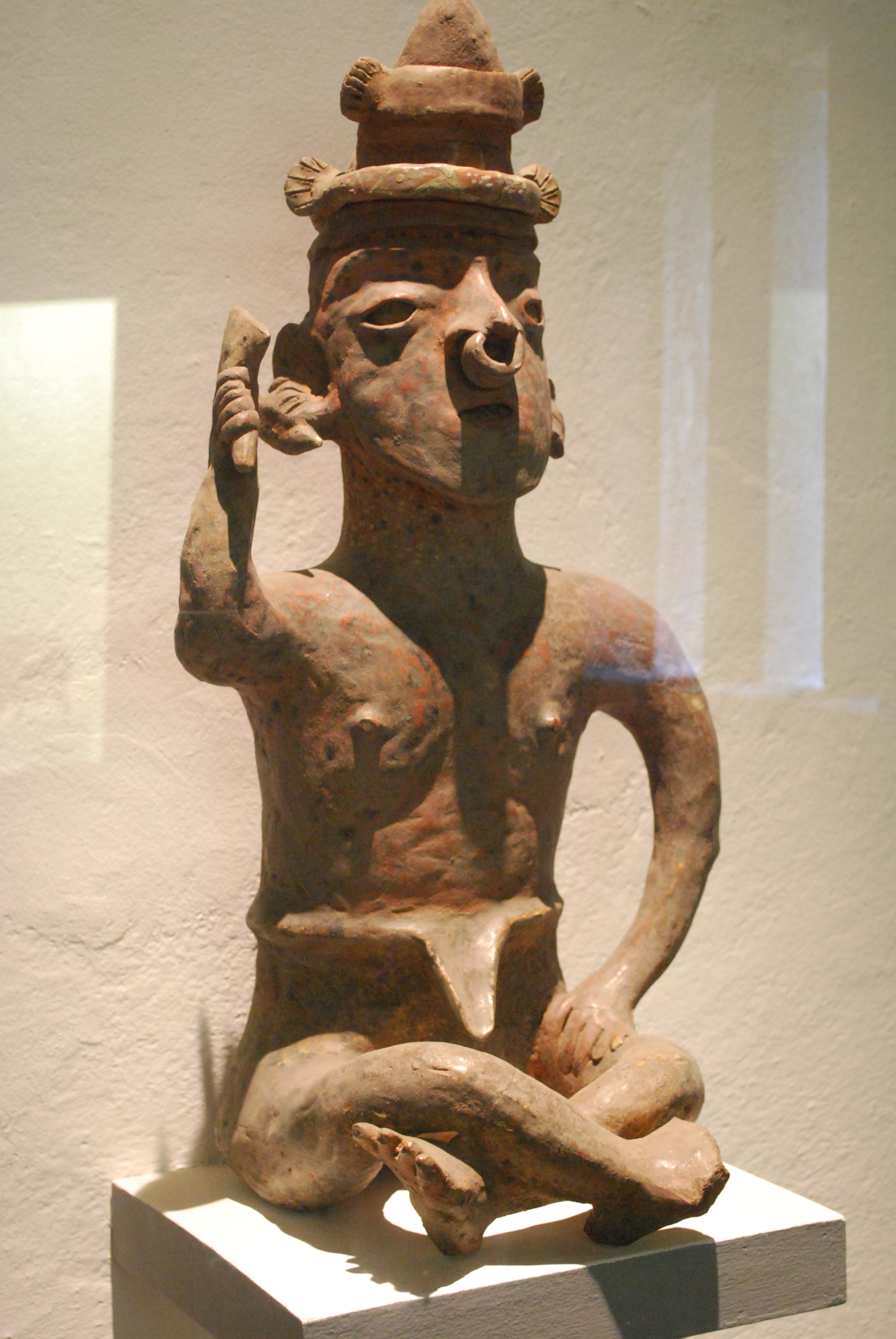
Ceramic Sculpture of Seated Figure

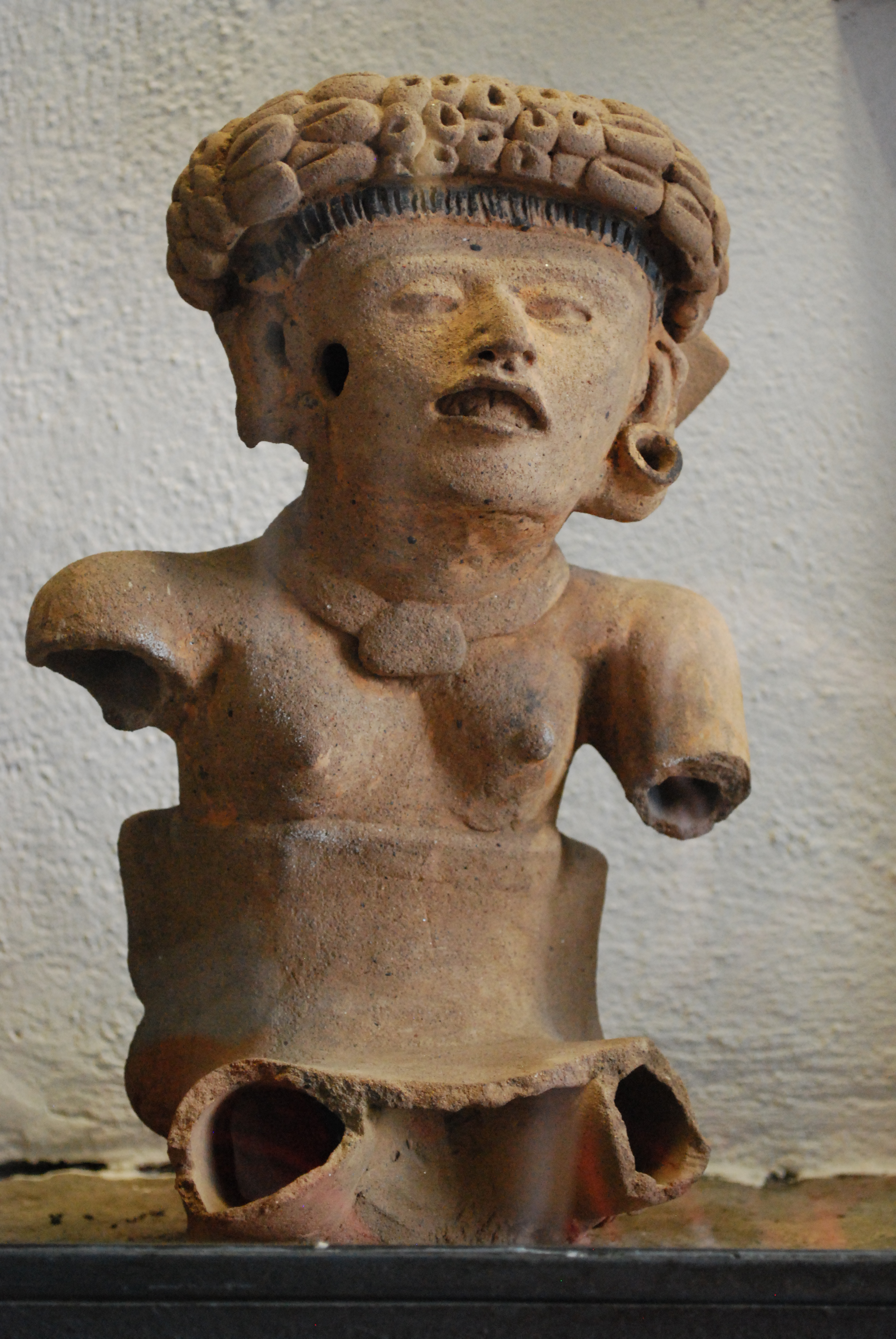
Ceramic Sculpture of a Women Lacking Arms and Legs

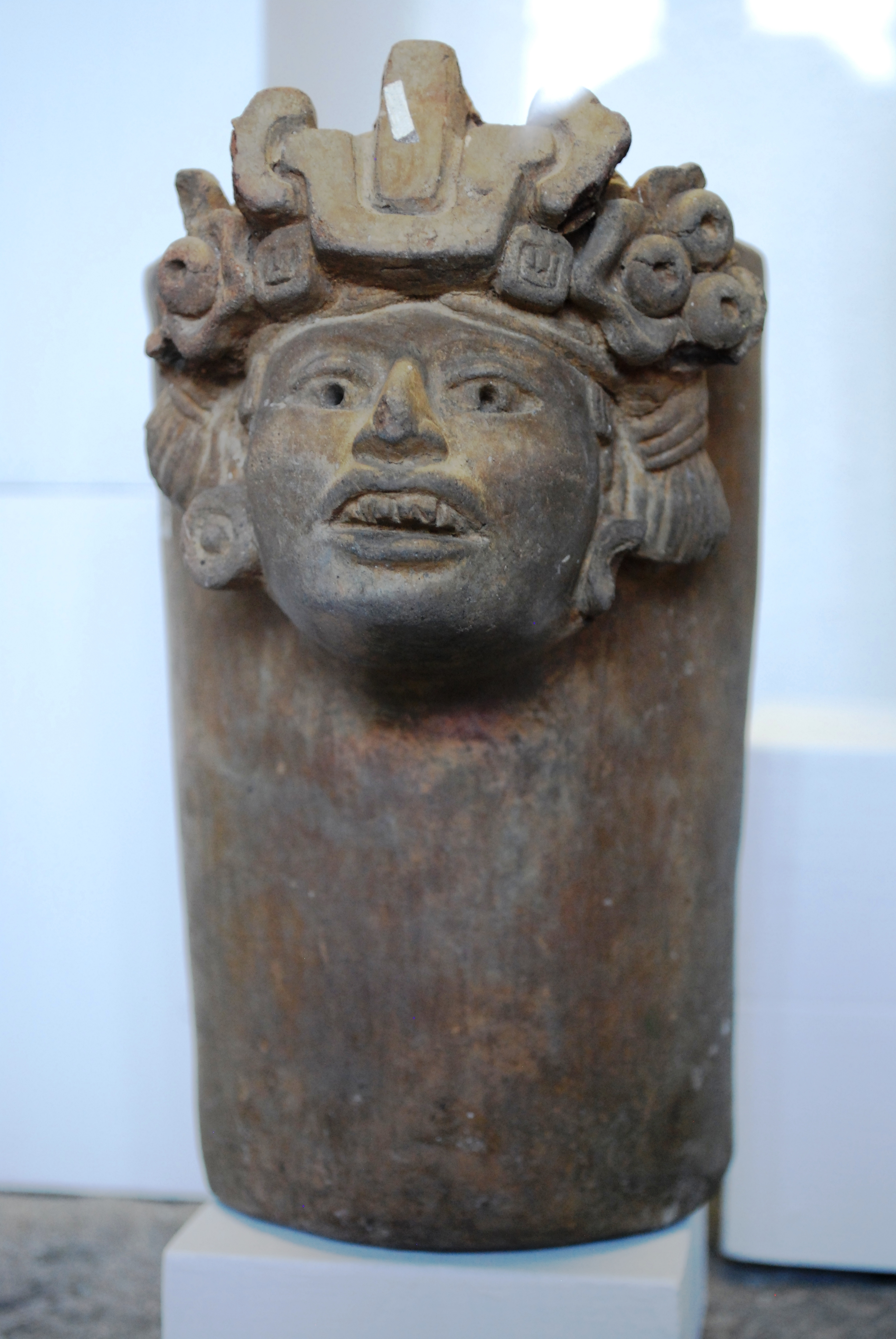
Ceramic vessel with Woman's Head

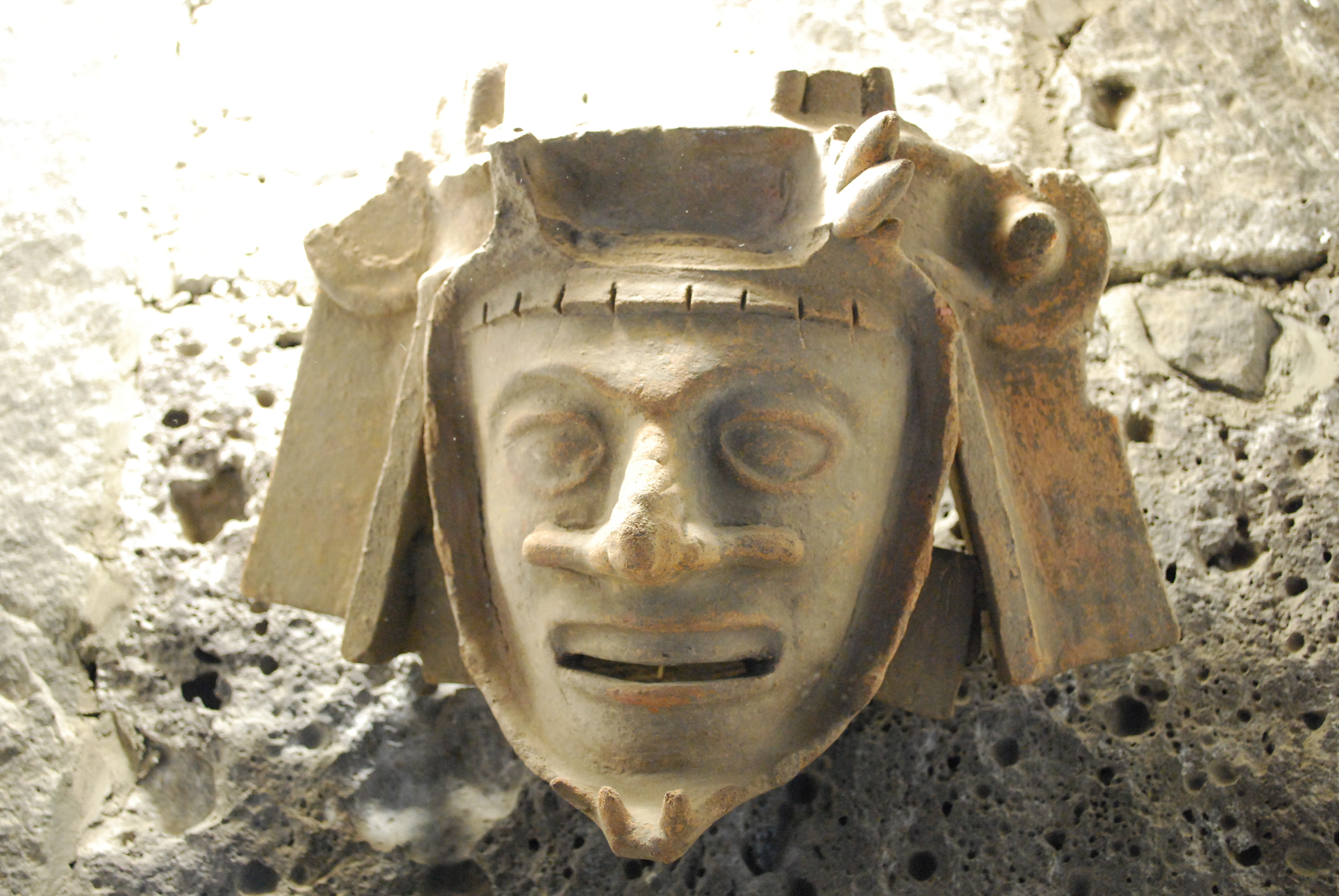
Ceramic Funeral Mask

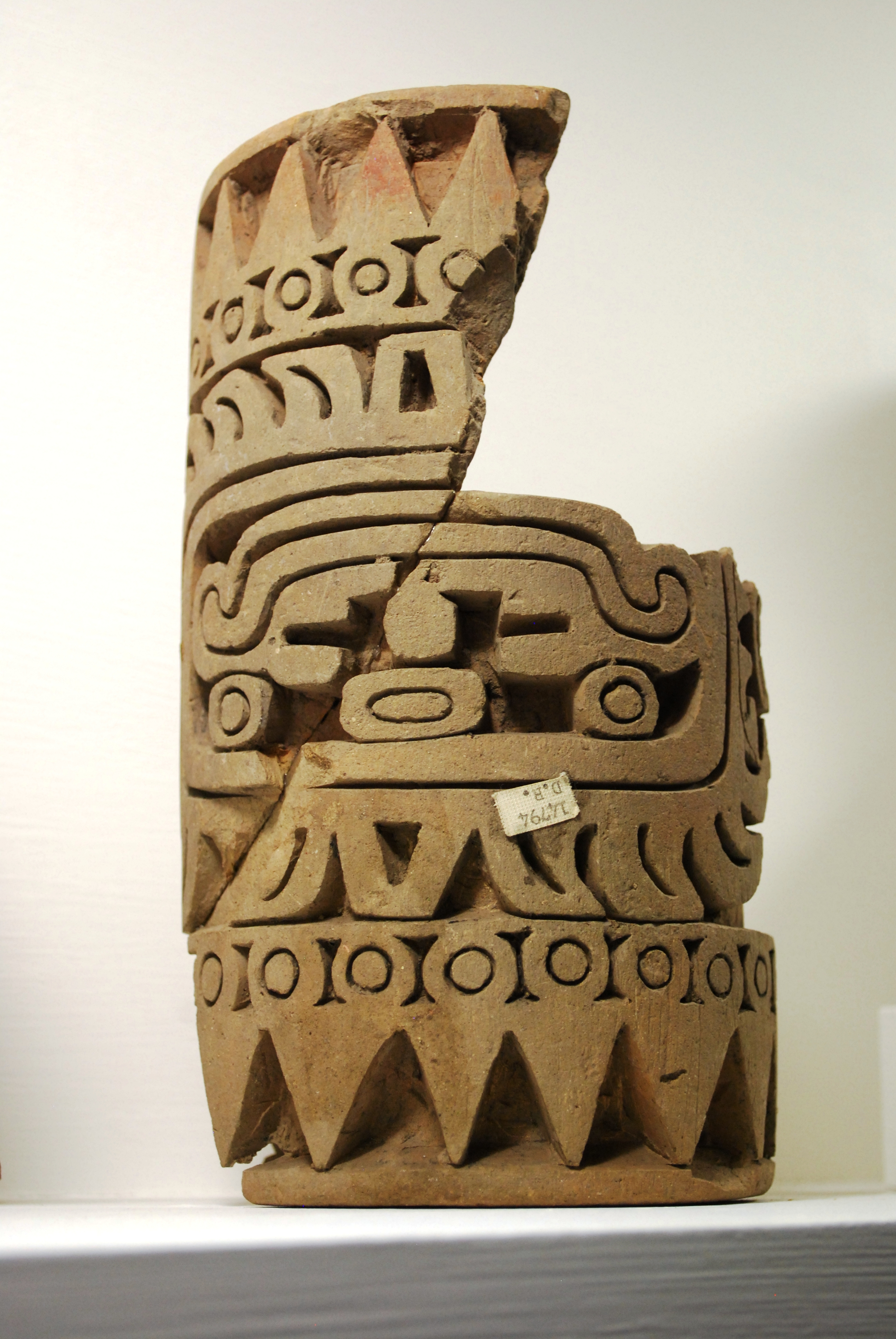
Ceramic or Stone Piece with High Ceramic Relief

=== Diego Rivera Sketch Collection ===
In the large central space located on the second floor of the Anahuacalli, called "Study", are exhibited 16 sketches for different murals made by Rivera in the early thirties. In them, it is to admire the mastery of classical composition learned by the muralist in his youth. Being a born draftsman, Rivera was able to exploit his skills thanks to his training at the Academy of San Carlos in Mexico (1898–1905), as well as his participation in the European avant-gardes and the knowledge he acquired about traditional art during his residence period in Europe (1907–1921).

In his mural work, Diego captures his totalizing conception of history. He portrays the class struggle and its protagonists, as well as the different currents that animate them. These sketches allow us to appreciate Rivera's work of technical and aesthetic experimentation, together with the process necessary to communicate the complexity of his ideas.

Among the drafts that are exhibited, stands out the one made for the mural Man at the Crossroads, painted in 1932 at the Rockefeller Center and later destroyed by the orders of magnate Nelson Rockefeller. Likewise, Historia del Estado de Morelos, part of the mural at the Palacio de Cortés in Cuernavaca, Conquest and Revolution (1933), and the sketches for The Portrait of America at the New Workers School New York, are impressive.

There is a sketch of a nude made for the mural in the Chapingo Chapel and a drawing that does not belong to any mural, entitled "Diego as a child drawing", in which he conveys his early passion for figuration.

Next, some of the drawings that are kept at the Anahuacalli:

Murals of the Palace of Cortés (1933), Cuernavaca:

- Sketch for the mural "History of the State of Morelos. Conquest and Revolution".
- Two full-size cards; one with the portrait of Morelos and another with the images of the La Patria and Zapata, which are part of the frescos "Independence 1810" and "Revolution 1910".
- Sketch for the mural "Encounter of Hernán Cortés with the Tlaxcaltecas".

Mural "The Portrait of America" (1930), for the New Workers School, New York:

- "The Conquerors", first panel of the preliminary study for the play "Class Struggle in the United States"

Mural "The Man at the Crossroads", (1932), for Rockefeller Center, New York:

- "The death of tyranny"
- "The death of idolatry"
- "The technical man"
- "The man at the crossroads" (A and B)

Other murals:

- "Meeting A", "Meeting B" (sketches for complementary panels of the mural "Nightmare of war and dream of peace")
- Sketch of the mural "Water, the origin of life", for the Cárcamo de Chapultepec
- Sketch of a nude figure inside the mural "Germination", found in Chapingo Chapel
- "Diego drawing as a child"

== New Anahuacalli Spaces ==
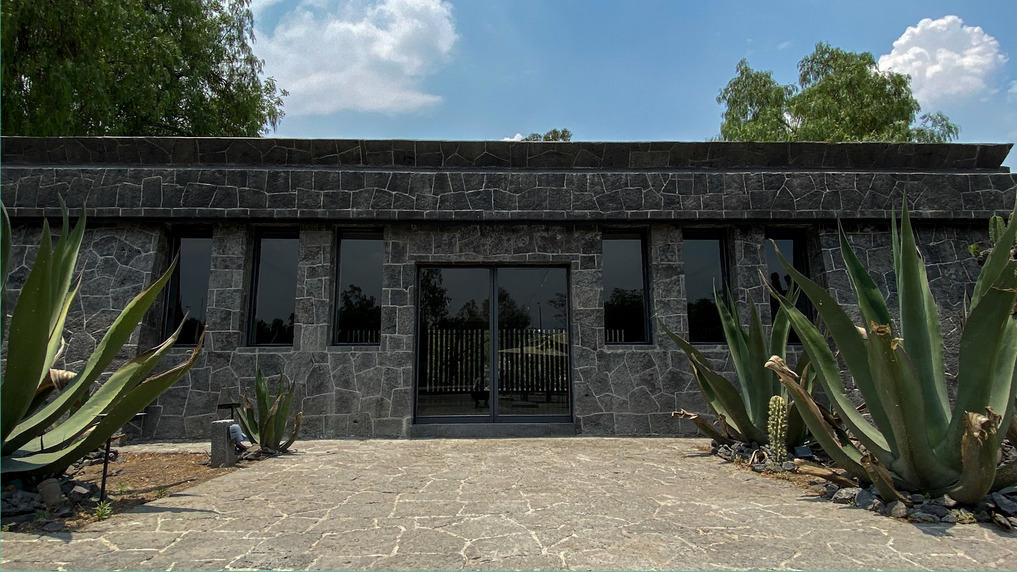
Toad-Frog Library

The Anahuacalli Museum working team devoted to the construction of new spaces, initially due to the need for a new collection depository room, since the original one built by Juan O'Gorman and Ruth Rivera -which lasted approximately 60 years- was too small for the number of pieces in all. Later, it was decided that the project would not be limited to this storage, but was to be extended to the constructions of buildings for workshops, offices and a new square. Additionally, the maintenance warehouses of the museum were remodeled, as well as the cafeteria, the library and the store.

The design of the new spaces was the work of the Mexican architect Mauricio Rocha Iturbide, who was meant to interpret Diego's initial project, achieving a dialogue between the original Anahuacalli building and the new structures. In other words, an interchange between contemporary art and pre-Hispanic art and architecture. Since the Anahuacalli style corresponds to the principles of organic architecture, it was sought that the new spaces harmonize with the natural landscape. In this regard, structural supports were used in order to raise the base of the buildings in such a way that they respect the rocky surface. The project involved the participation of the engineer Santiago Sánchez Aedo and his building company Arquitech, for the construction of the structures.

Among the new spaces, the Collections Warehouse highlights, destined for the protection, conservation, restoration, study and even exhibition to researchers, of the pieces of the pre-Columbian collection bequeathed by Diego Rivera. The treasures that are not permanently exhibited in the main building are kept in this room, nevertheless, those pieces enjoy the same artistic, historical and cultural importance than the ones that are on public display.

The new Anahuacalli spaces, inaugurated in September 2021, are the following:

Sapo-Rana Library: part of the Rivera's original project inaugurated in 1964, a traditional and multidisciplinary space that has been beautifully remodelled.

Plazuela Ruth: exterior space for cultural and social activities of various kinds.

Dance and Movement: room for the development and learning of performing arts.

The Mirador: an original and high place that offers a view of the main building of the Anahuacalli.

Stone Forum: roofed outdoor space, in connection with volcanic stone. For activities that require reduced forum capacity.

The Cube: a space with a minimalist, semi-open and multidisciplinary design, suitable for carrying out a variety of artistic activities.

Creation: semi-open space for multiple uses, with a natural light entrance in a functionalist style.

Experimentation: space equipped with water supply, for the development of artistic workshops and various events.

Machines Forum: roofed outdoor space, in connection with the volcanic soil that is original to the place.

Lola Forum: open-air space inserted in a green area, in dialogue with the vegetation that naturally emerges from the volcanic topography of El Pedregal.

O’Gorman Warehouse: its modern and functional design enables it to safeguard all kinds of working materials, as well as for holding cultural and social events.

Patio Las Moras: outside space.

Patio Los Helechos: designed to enable the appreciation of the exuberant vegetation from the Ecological Space of the Anahuacalli Museum.

Patio Palo Loco: open space, with an original, modern and poly-functional design. Located next to the visitor's entrance.

Las Piedras: pre-existing exterior infrastructure that was transformed for multiple uses.

== Cultural activities ==
The Anahuacalli Museum, in addition to housing the Diego Rivera's collection and sketches of his mural paintings, also offers a variety of workshops for diverse audiences.

The workshops are for artistic, environmental and multidisciplinary training. The offer includes face-to-face and online courses in various disciplines, such as urban photography, watercolor and landscape, drawing of pre-Hispanic pieces and others.

In August 2026, the museum hosted Encuentros Digitales Anahuacalli (Anahuacalli Digital Encounters), a program of digital art promoted by 8NAP Art in collaboration with Superchief and Mythaic. It brought together 22 digital artists from more than ten countries working in media including generative art, artificial intelligence, glitch art, film, post-photography, stereoscopic 3D and interactive experiences, with a thematic focus on the relationship between technology, myth, memory and the cultural project of Diego Rivera. According to the museum, the works were created specifically for the program and were scheduled to be presented during the first week of August 2026 in the museum's library, with free daytime admission.

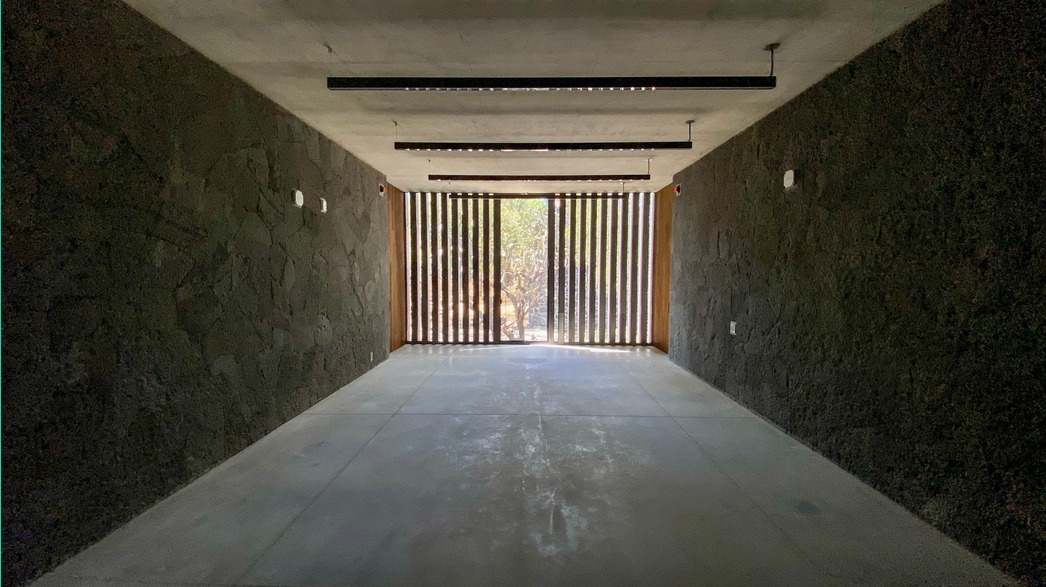
Creation Space

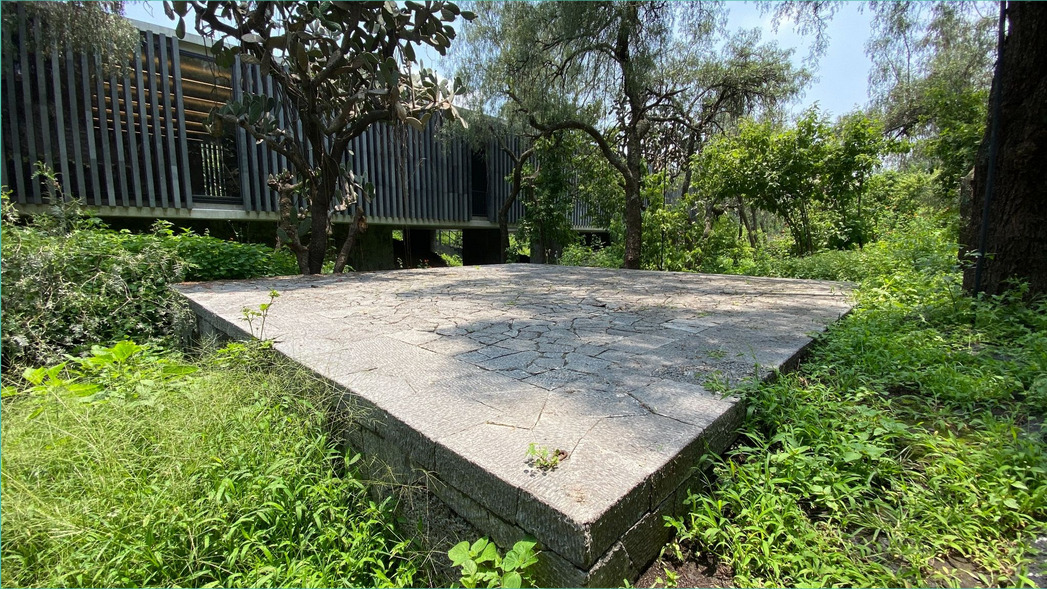
Lola Forum

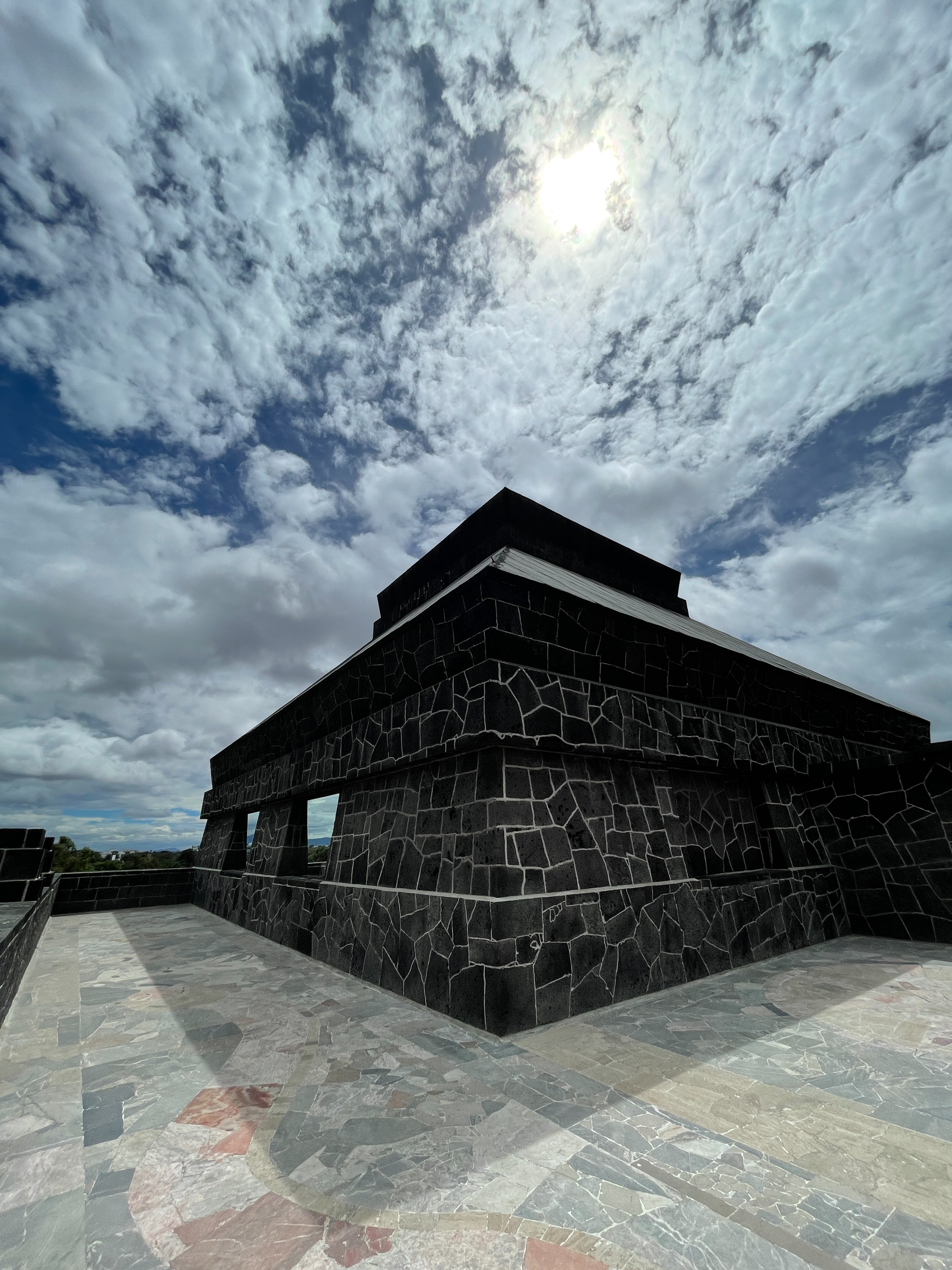
Anahuacalli's terrace

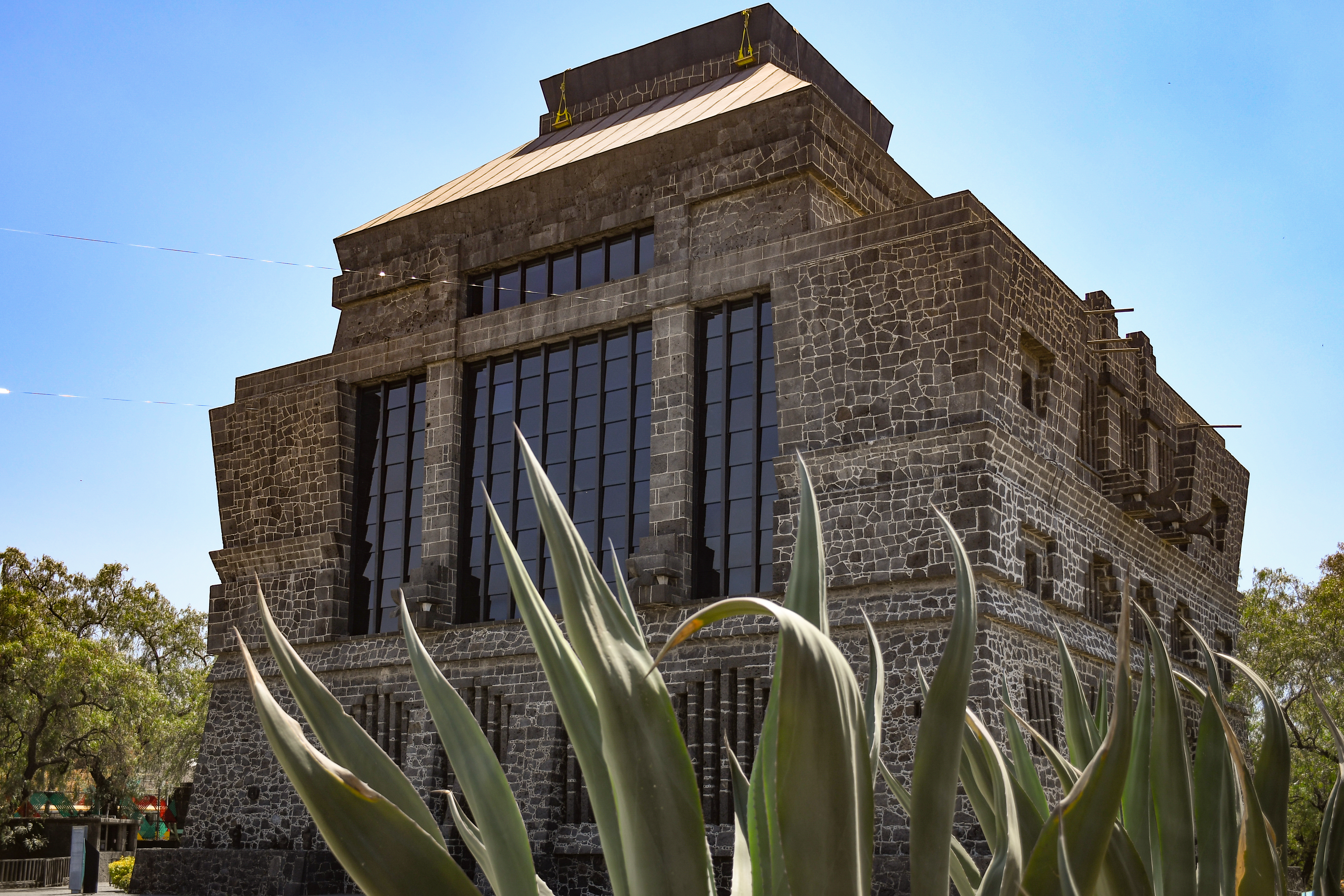
Anahuacalli's facade

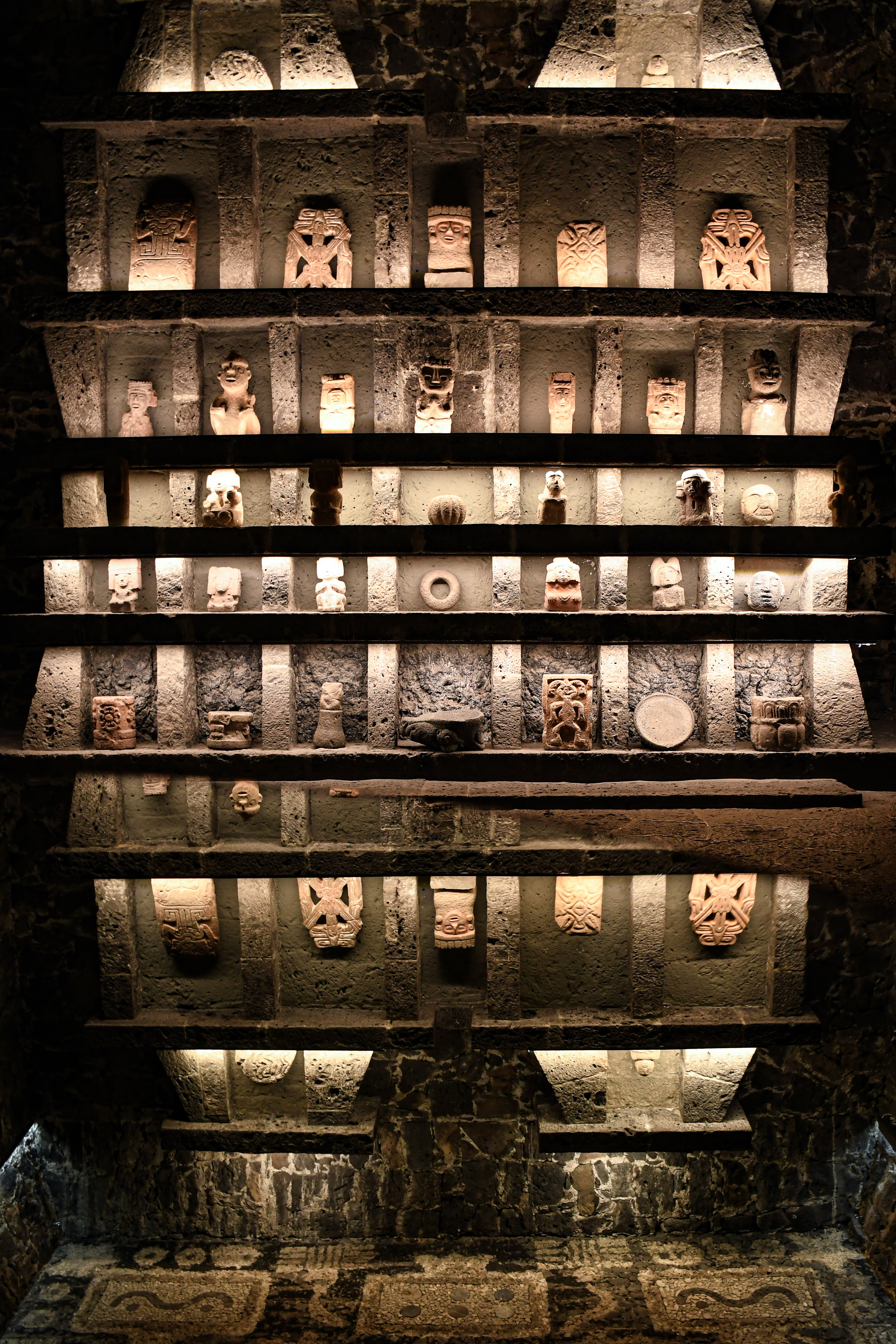
Prehispanic art altar

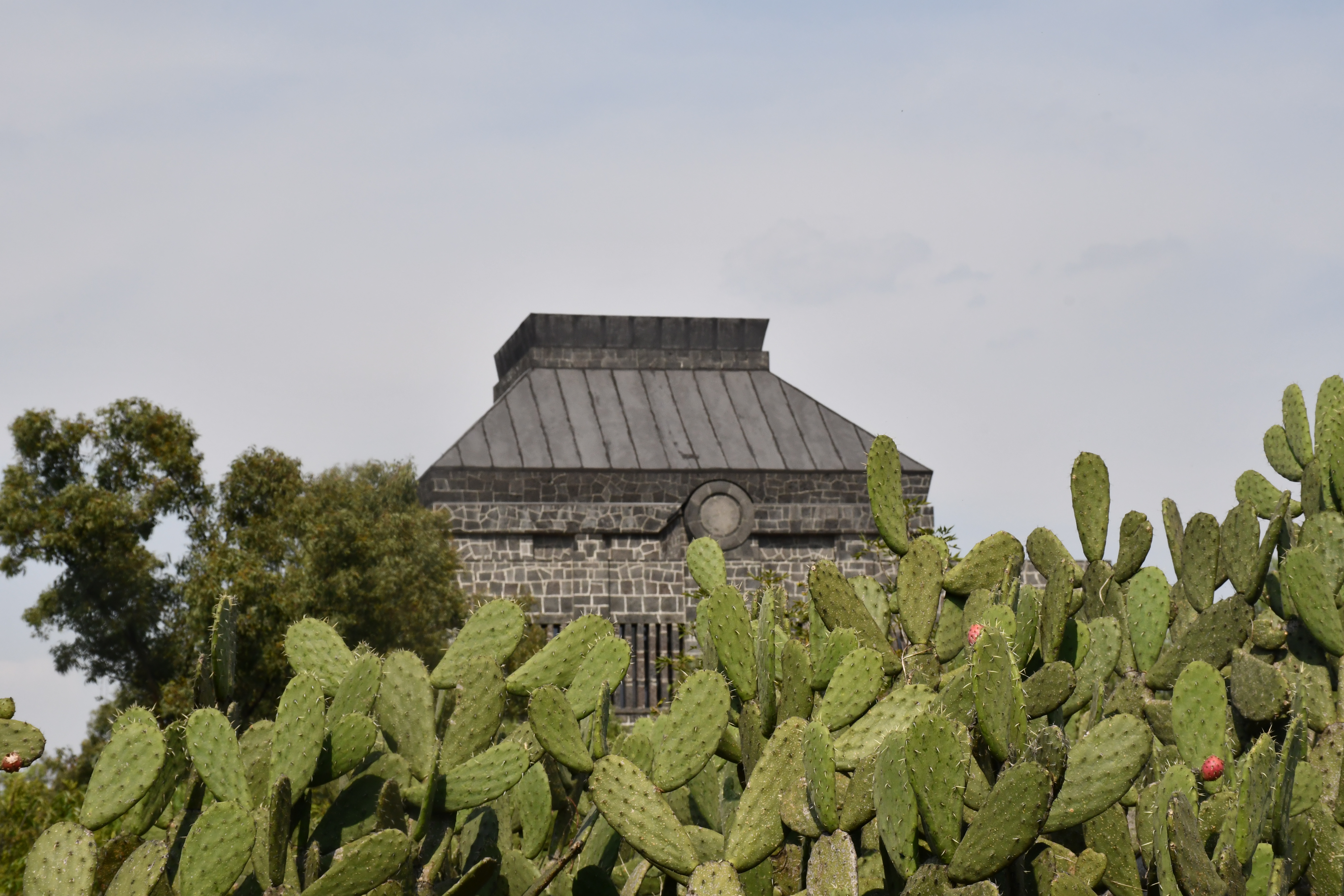
View of Anahuacalli from Ecological Reserve

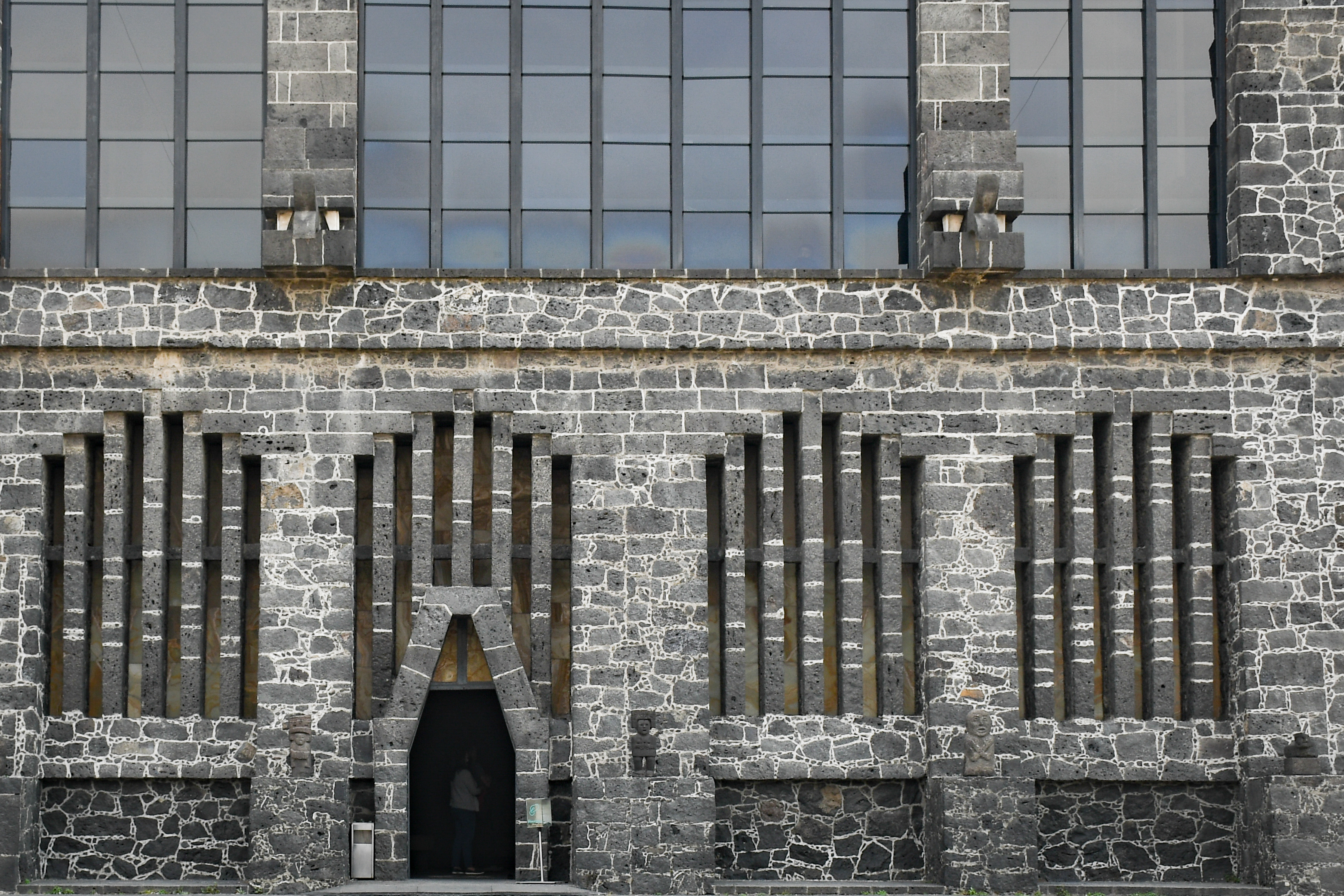
Anahuacalli's main entrance

== See also ==
- Frida Kahlo Museum
- Museo Mural Diego Rivera
