= Casa Estudio Leonora Carrington =

Biographical museum in Mexico

Coordinates: 19°25′05″N 99°09′23″W

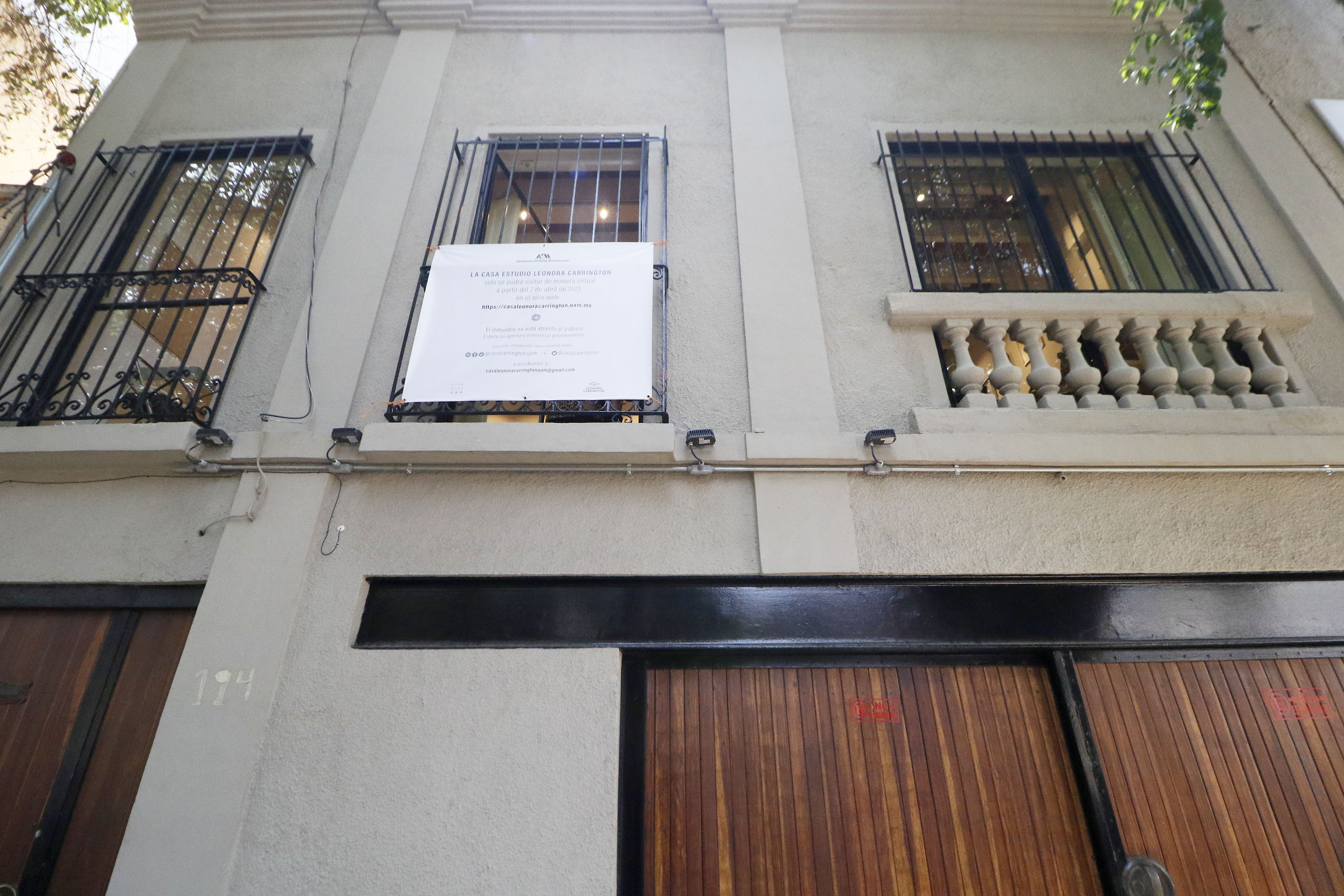
- Entrance
- Location: Colonia Roma, Mexico City
- Type: Biographical art studio
- Director: Alejandra Osorio
- Owner: Universidad Autónoma Metropolitana
- Public transit access: Álvaro Obregón bus station
- Website: casaleonoracarrington.uam.mx

The Casa Estudio Leonora Carrington, also known as Casona Leonora Carrington, and formerly intended as Casa Museo Leonora Carrington, was the home of British surrealist painter and writer Leonora Carrington. It is found at Chihuahua Street 194, colonia Roma Norte, in the Cuauhtémoc borough of Mexico City.

The house was expected to open to the public as a museum in 2022. In 2024 it was announced by its university owners that the house would not become a museum.

== History ==
Leonora Carrington lived in the house for more than 60 years, from 1948 until her death in 2011 (aged 94). It is a three-storey mansion in Chihuahua Street in colonia Roma Norte, Mexico City. There, she painted many of her best-known works, wrote her novel The Hearing Trumpet and also raised her two sons with her husband Emerico "Chiki" Weisz, a Hungarian photographer.

In 2017, the house, along with more than 8,600 objects, was purchased by Mexico City’s Universidad Autónoma Metropolitana (UAM) from Carrington's son with the stipulation that it would become a museum. Starting in 2018, at £3m restoration began on the house to enable it to receive visitors and display more than 8,000 of the artist's objects.

In October 2024, it was announced by the university that the house would not become a museum and would instead become a "documentation centre" for "teaching and research".

== Gallery ==
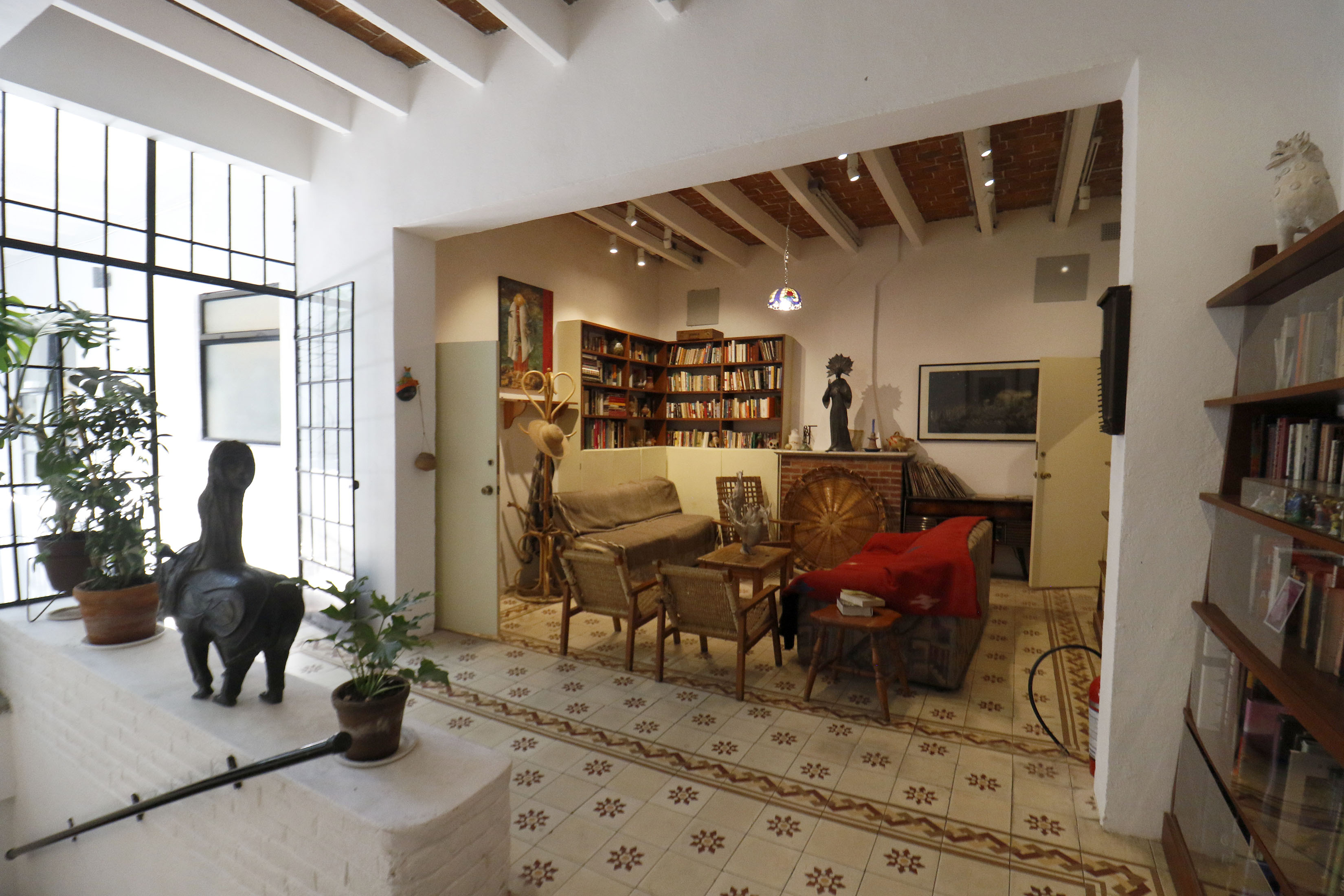

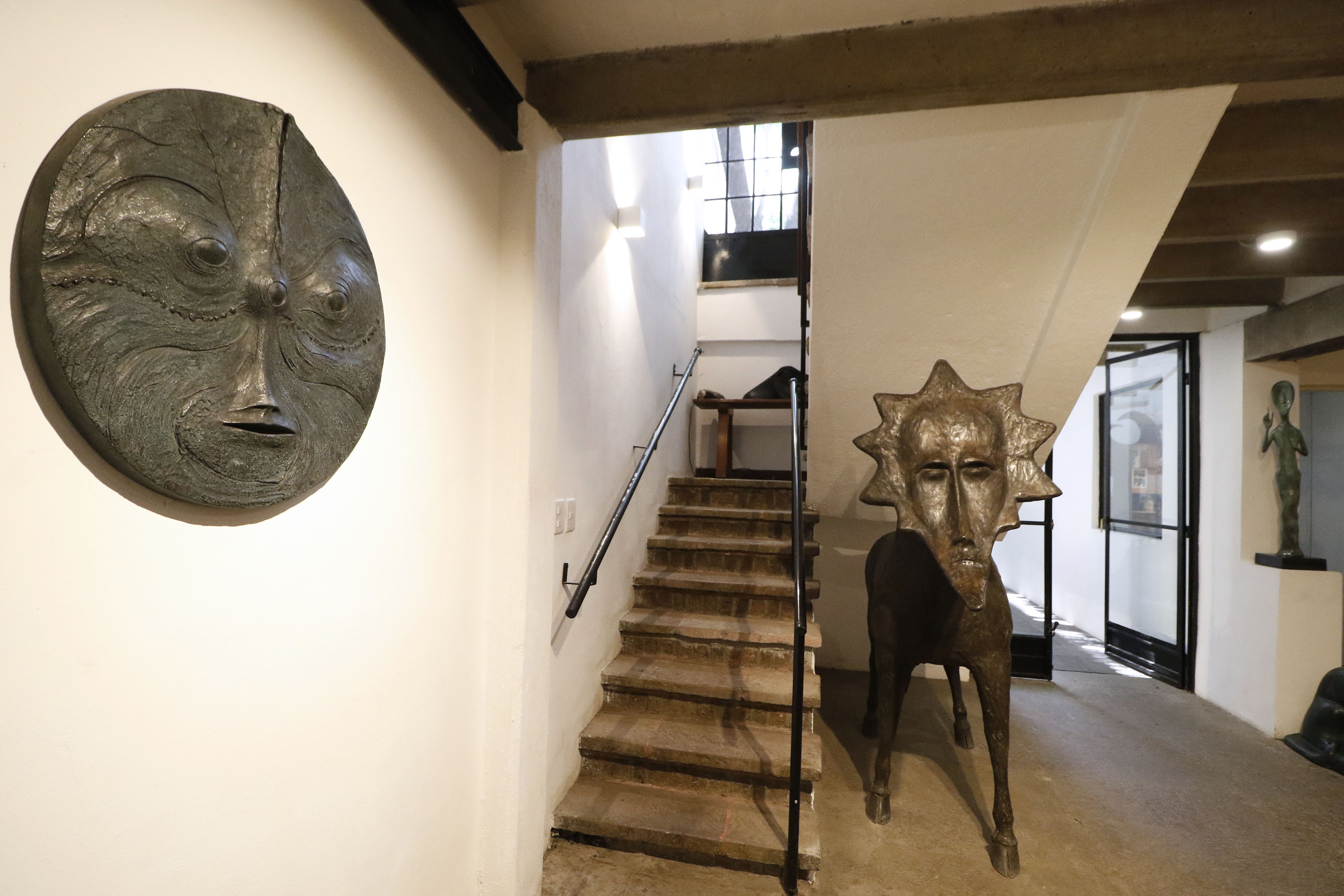

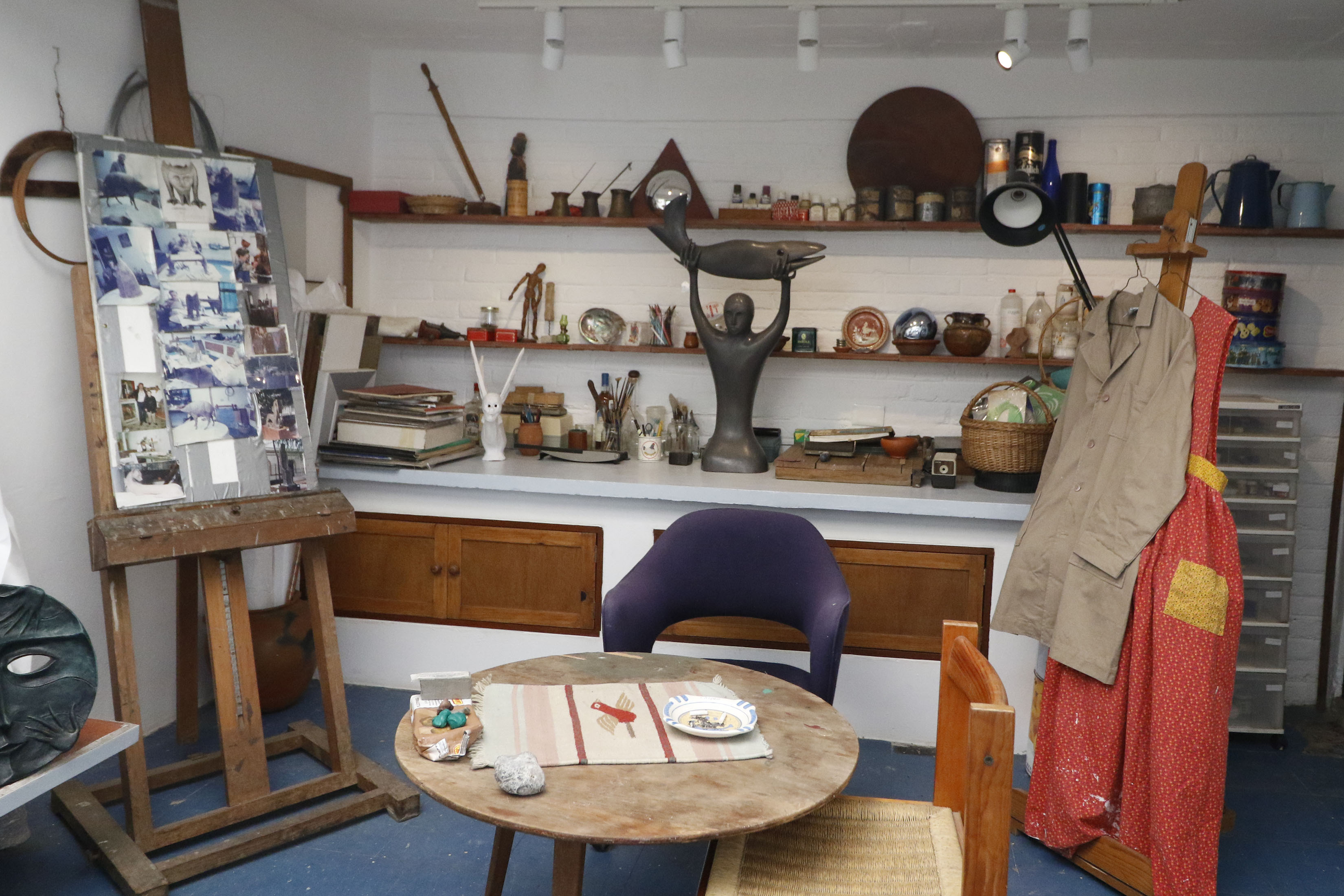

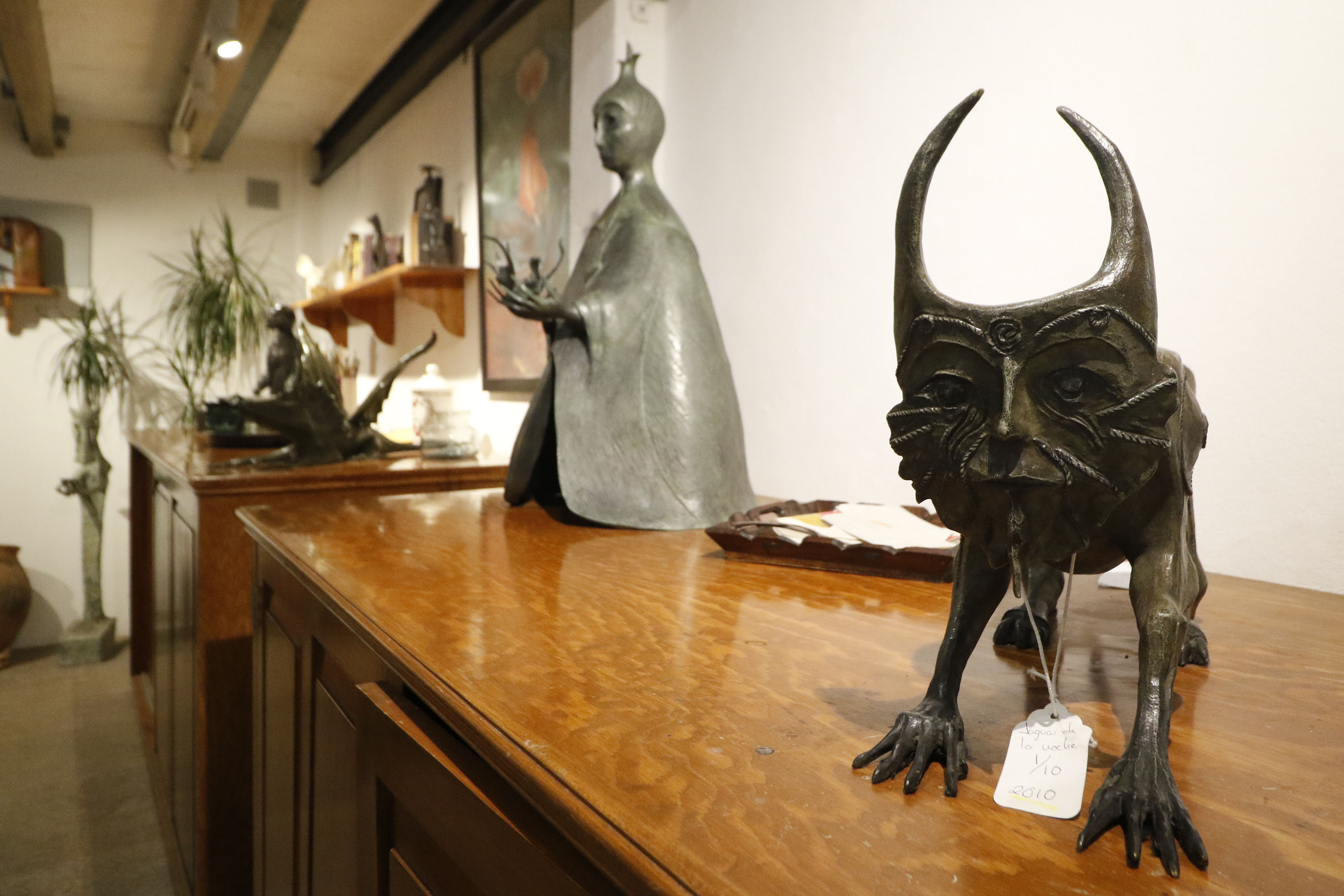

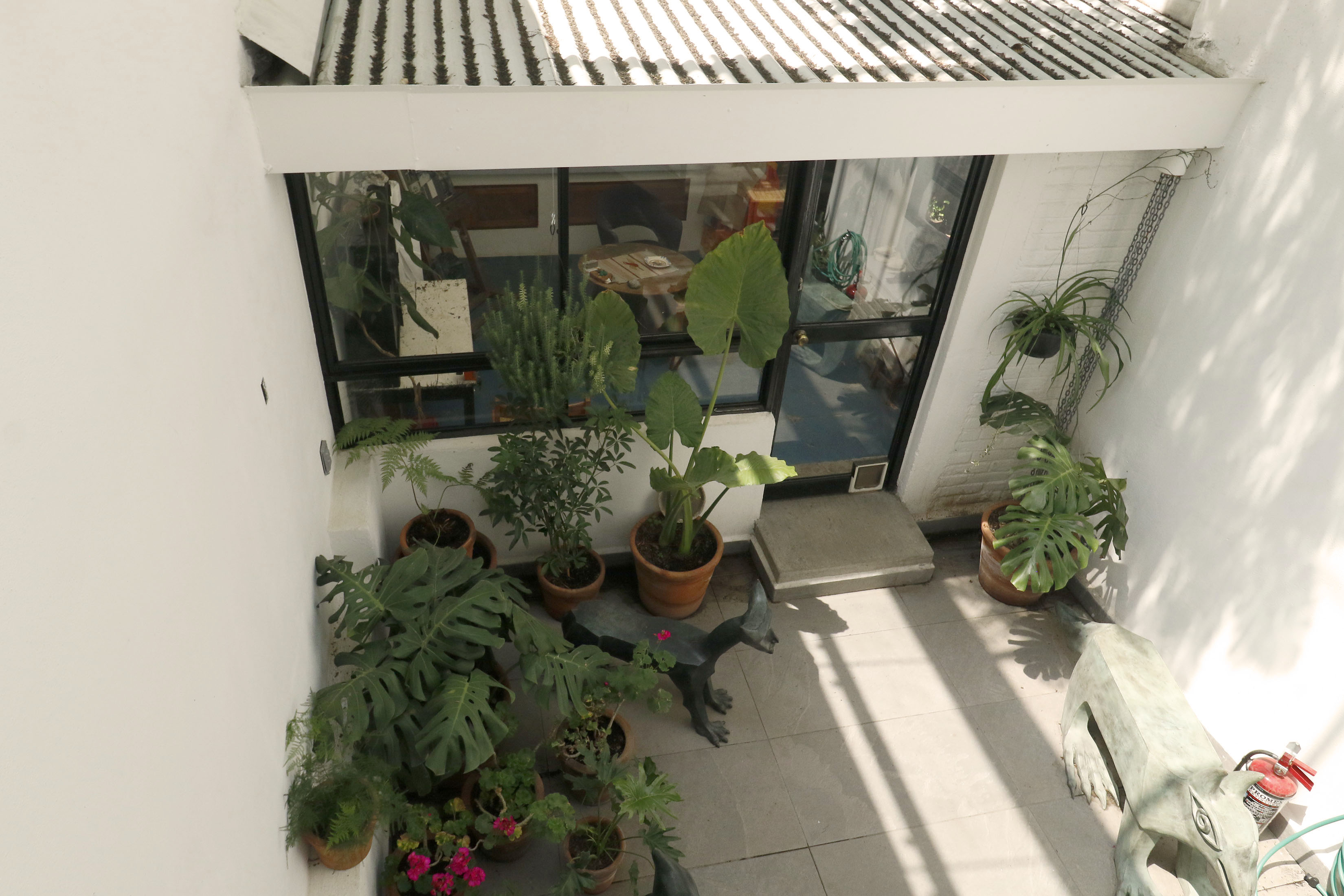

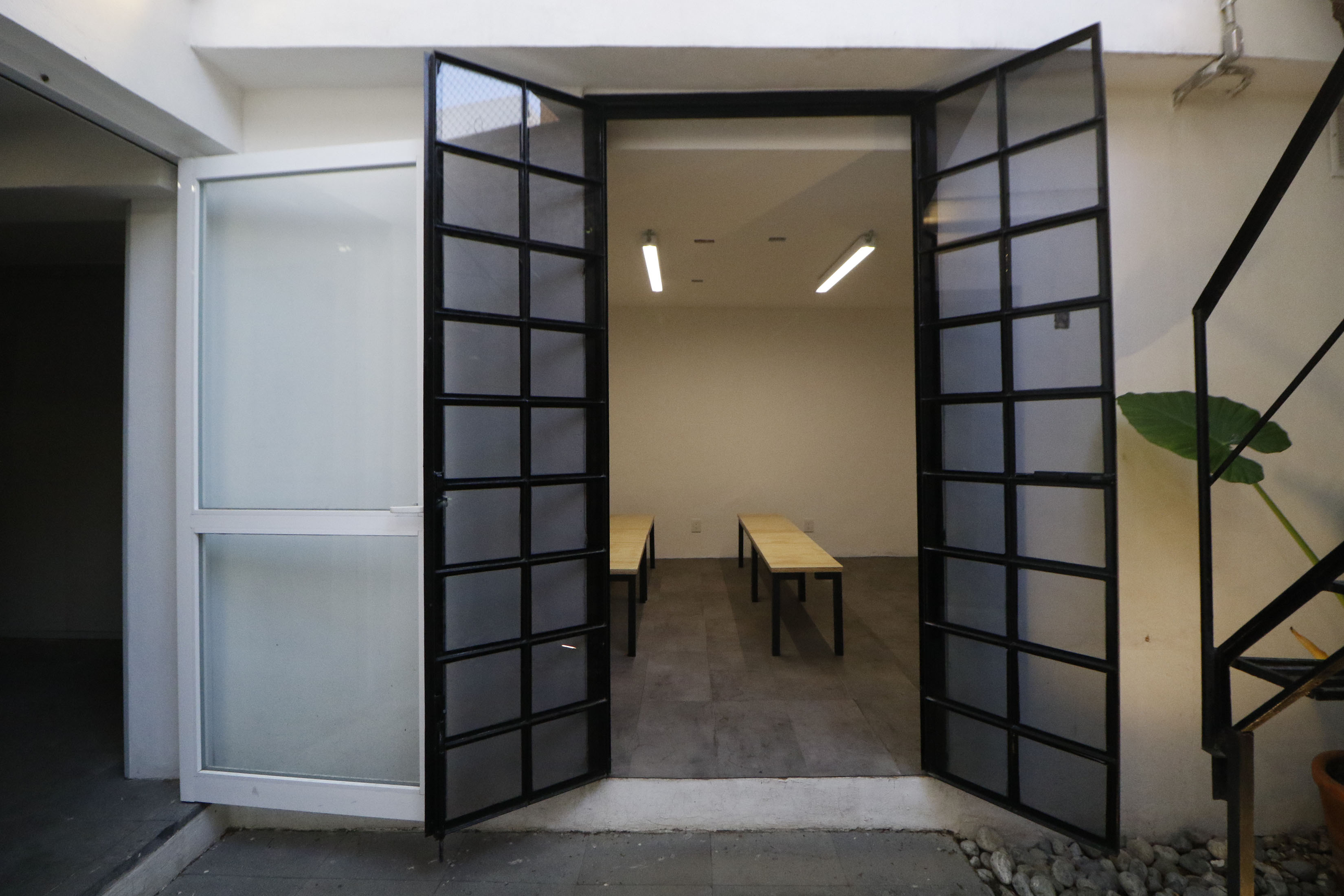

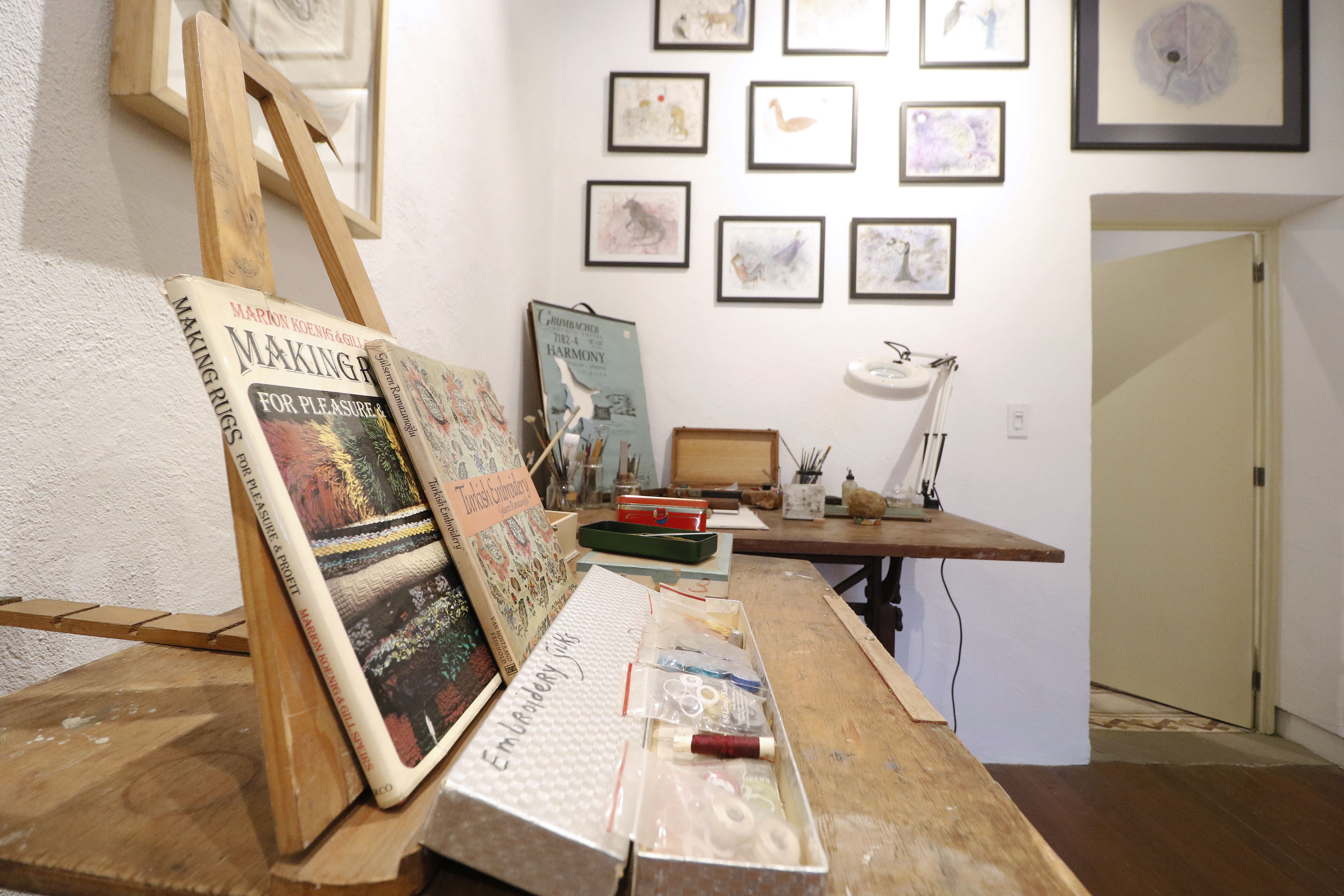

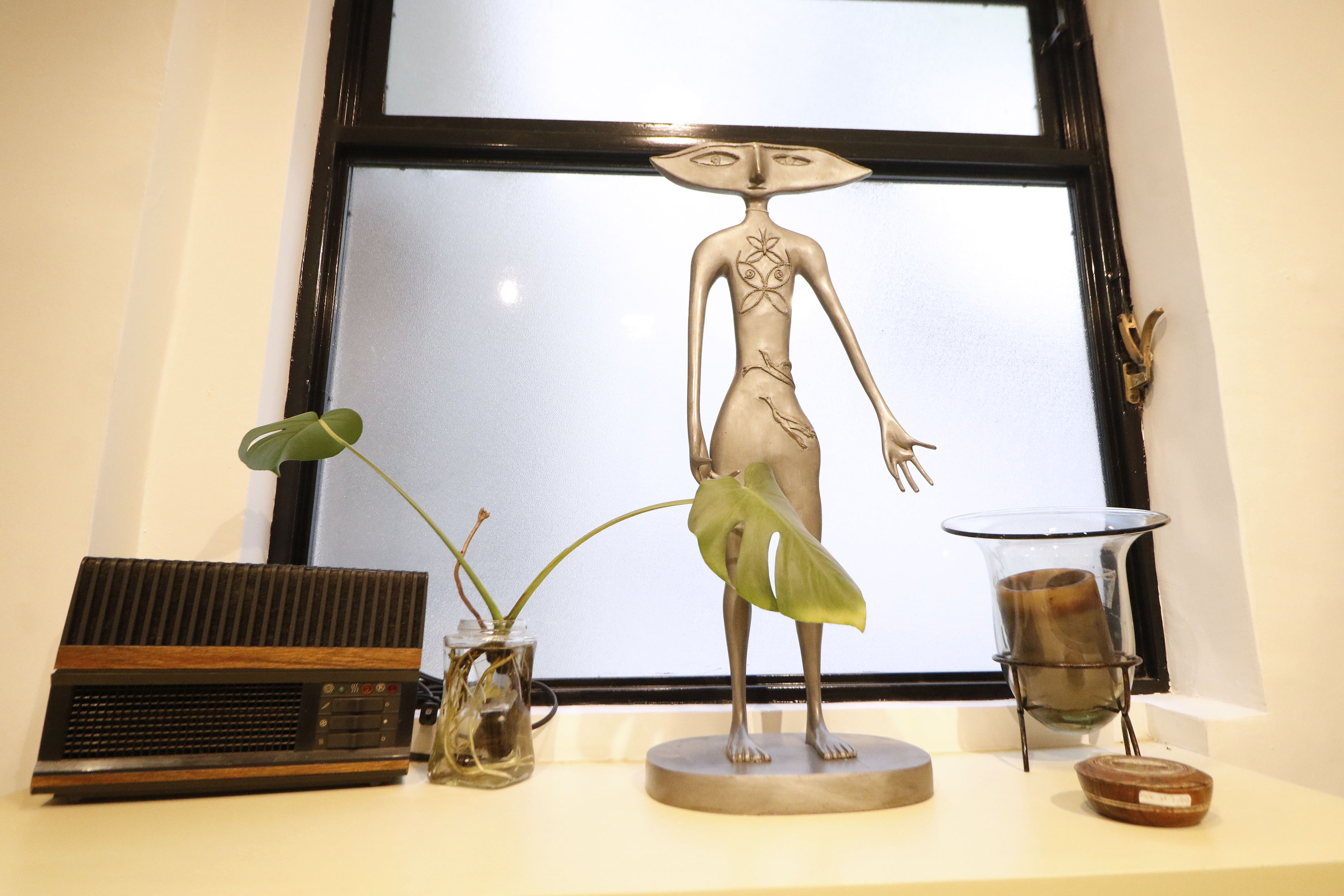

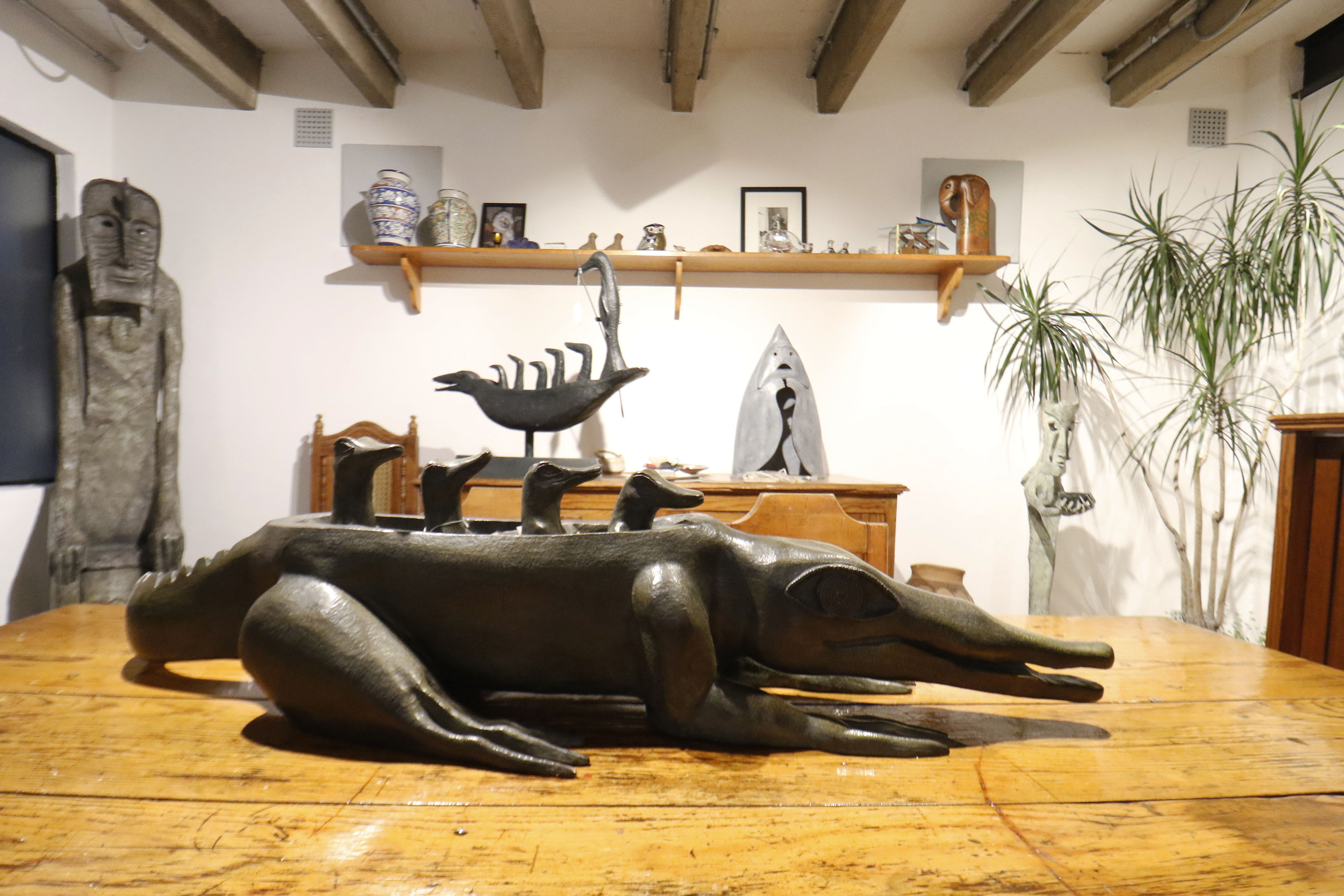

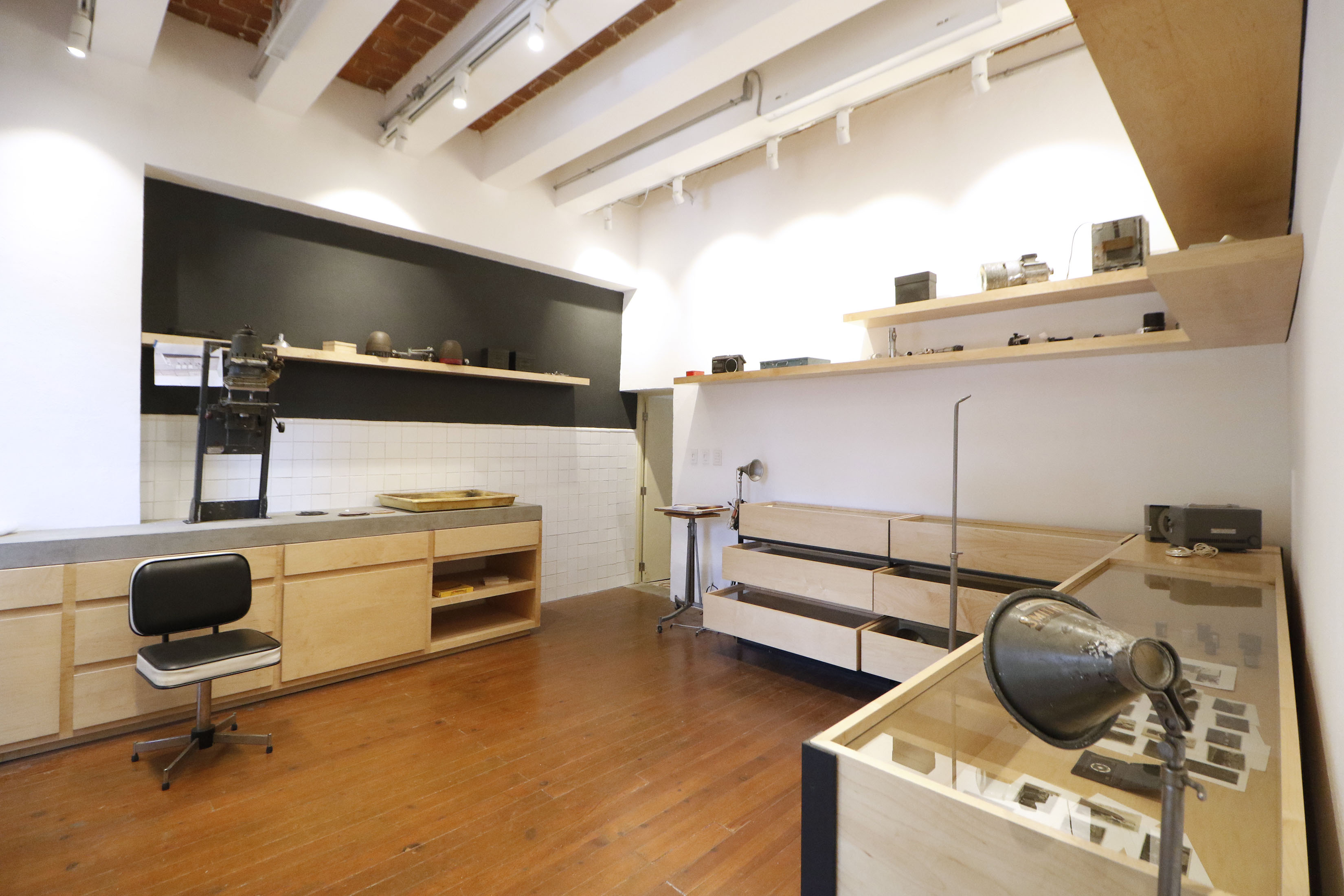

== See also ==
- Museo Leonora Carrington
- Frida Kahlo Museum
- Luis Barragán House and Studio
- List of historic house museums in Mexico
