= Memory, the Heart =

1937 painting by Frida Kahlo

Frida Kahlo, 1937, Memory, the Heart, oil on metal, 40 x 28 cm

Memory, the Heart, a 1937 painting by the Mexican artist Frida Kahlo, depicts the pain and anguish Kahlo experienced during and after an affair between her husband, artist Diego Rivera, and her sister, Cristina Kahlo.

The painting is sometimes known by the title Recuerdo (Memory). The oil-on-metal work measures 40 x 28 cm, and is held in the collection of Michel Petitjean in Paris, France.

== Description ==
Kahlo portrays herself standing on a beach by the water's edge, one foot on the sand and one in the sea, looking towards the viewer with an expressionless face covered in tears. A metal rod goes through a large empty space in her chest. The rod has an image of Cupid at each end, shown as if riding a seesaw. Frida's heart is represented by a large bleeding mutilated organ lying outside her body. The blood from the heart seeps into the sand and flows into the sea. Two dresses, one a schoolgirl dress, the other her traditional Tehuantepec-style costume, hang near Frida; not empty, they contain one human arm apiece. The schoolgirl dress arm reaches for but does not touch Frida, while the arm in the Tehuana dress supports the armless and immobile artist.

These symbols and others in the painting show the artist's immense pain, and her personal emotional damage and rebuilding, resulting from the affair between her sister and husband.

== See also ==
- List of paintings by Frida Kahlo
