= Museo Leonora Carrington =

Biographical museum in Mexico

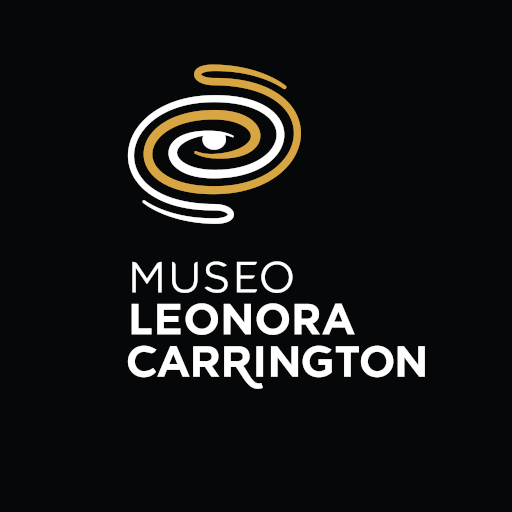
- Established: 22 March 2018
- Location: San Luis Potosí City and Xilitla
- Coordinates: 22°8′18″N 100°58′22″W
- Type: Public
- Director: Antonio García Acosta
- President: Fermín Llamazares
- Owner: Secretaría de Cultura de San Luis Potosí

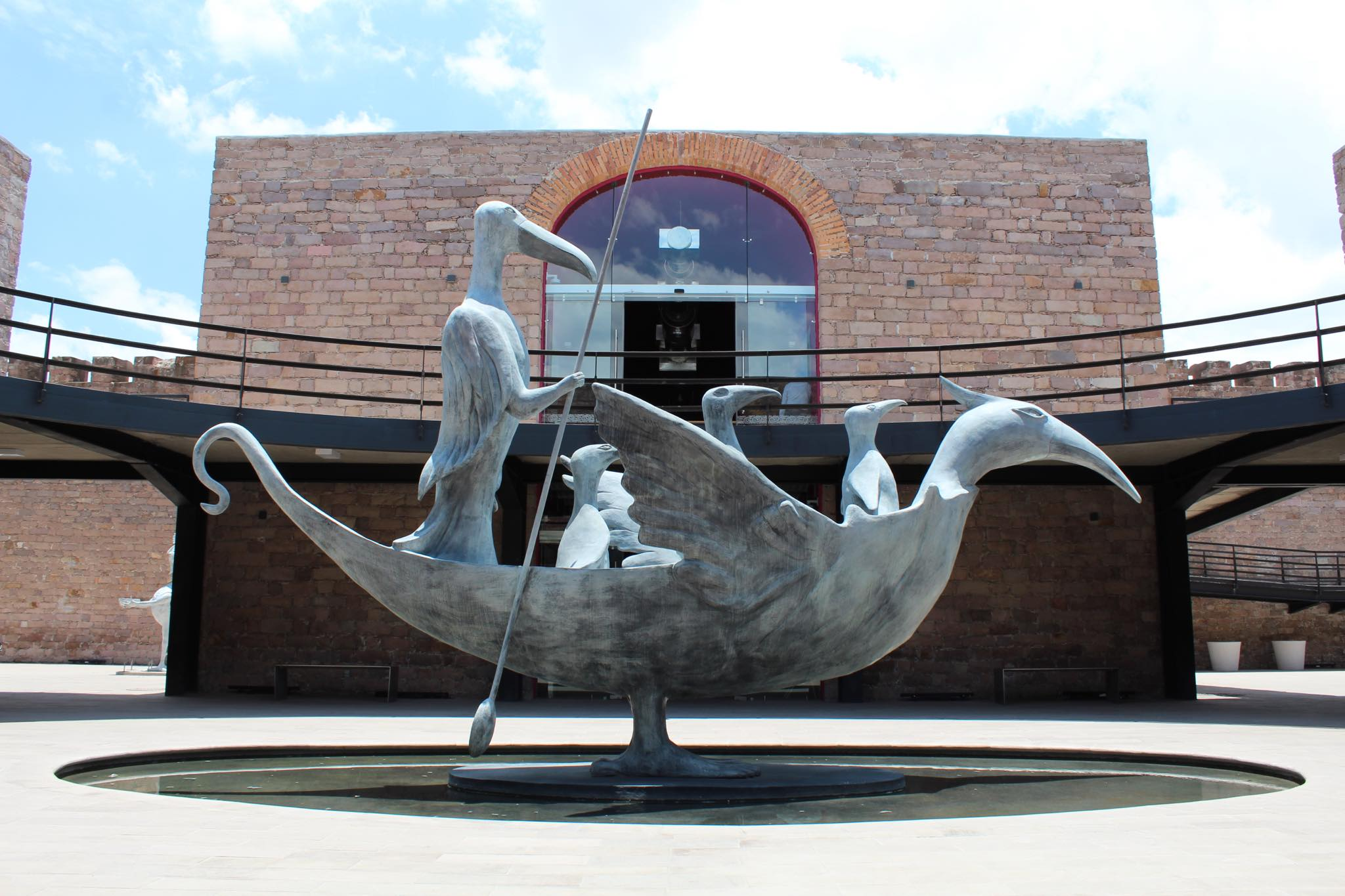
“La Barca de las Grullas” at Museo Leonora Carrington San Luis Potosí

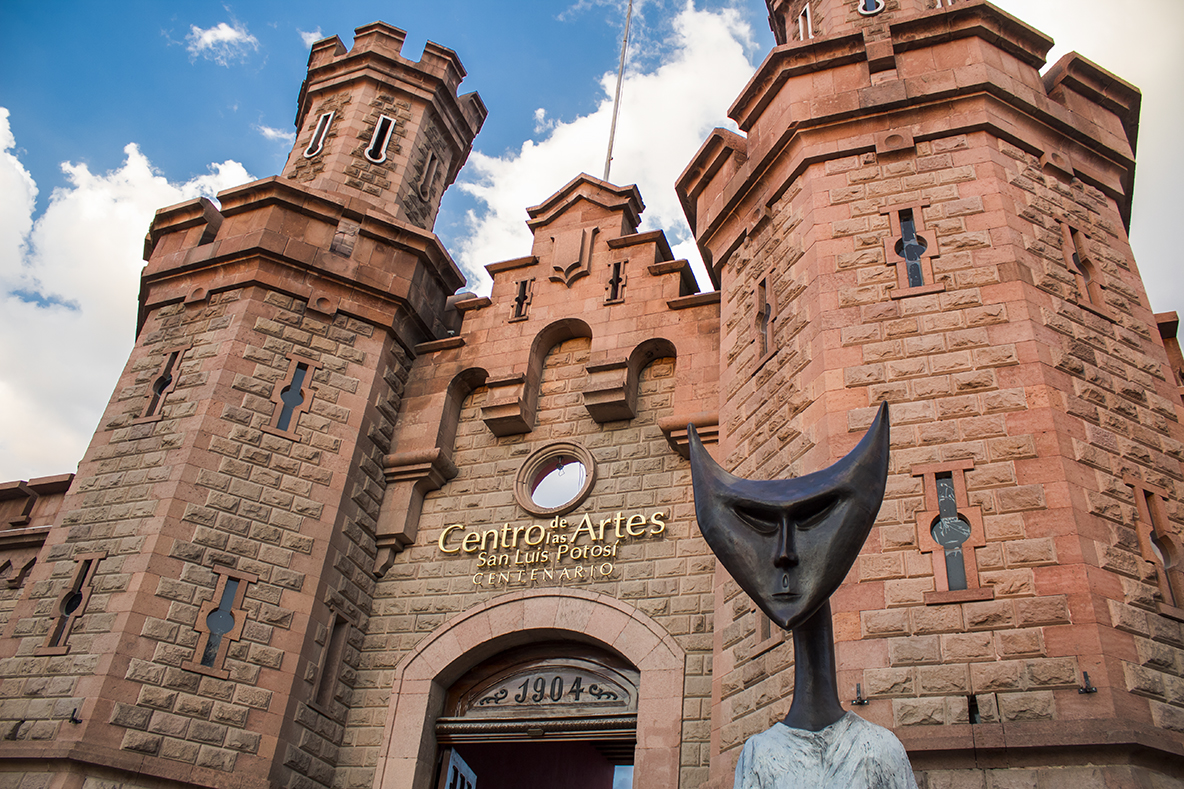
Entrance to San Luis Potosí Arts Center

The Museo Leonora Carrington is a museum with venues in the San Luis Potosí City and Xilitla, state of San Luis Potosí, México; dedicated to the surrealist artist Leonora Carrington, the Museo Leonora Carrington San Luis Potosí opened 22 March 2018, with Juan Manuel Carreras as governor of the state. The museum houses a collection of the artist's sculptures, jewelry, engravings, and personal objects; and presents temporary exhibits about surrealism and works influenced by Carrington's work. The collection was donated by Pablo Weisz Carrington, son of the artist, for the creation of the museum.

In 2017 Leonora Carrington's home studio in Mexico City was purchased by Mexico City’s Universidad Autónoma Metropolitana from Carrington's son with the stipulation that it would become a museum. In October 2024 it was announced by the university that this would not happen, and that the house would instead become a "documentation centre" for "teaching and research".

== San Luis Potosí ==
The museum is part of the San Luis Potosí Centenario Arts Center, home to art education schools, exhibition halls, workshops and the Multipurpose Theater. The complex was built in the 19th century to serve as a prison, it was designed as a panopticon, the control system originally proposed by the English philosopher Jeremy Bentham, whereby a group of buildings is guarded from a central tower.

In 1999, the prison was moved to a new location. Most of the buildings and outdoor areas were restored by architect Alejandro Sanchez between 2005 and 2009, and the section of the building that now houses the museum was restored between 2017 and 2018. The museum houses the International Center for the Study and Dissemination of Surrealism, dedicated to the study of this artistic movement of strong presence in Mexico.

== Xilitla ==
On 19 October 2018 the Museo Leonora Carrington Xilitla opened in the Xilitla pueblo mágico with sculptures, lithographs and other pieces by the artist, the museum has three permanent exhibition rooms and one temporary exhibition room spread over 814 m^{2}, the museum offers educational and cultural services.

== See also ==
- Las Pozas
- Museo de Arte Contemporáneo de Monterrey
