= Cristina Kahlo =

Sister of artist Frida Kahlo

- Born: Cristina Kahlo y Calderón; 7 June 1908; Coyoacán, Mexico City, Mexico
- Died: 8 February 1964 (aged 55); Coyoacán, Mexico City, Mexico
- Resting place: Panteón Inglés, Miguel Hidalgo, Mexico City, Mexico
- Other name: Christina Kahlo Pinedo
- Spouse: Antonio Pineda
- Children: 2
- Parents: Guillermo Kahlo (father); Matilde Calderón y González (mother)
- Relatives: Frida Kahlo (sister)

Cristina Kahlo y Calderón (7 June 1908 – 8 February 1964) was the sister of artist Frida Kahlo. Frida painted a portrait of Cristina, titled Portrait of Cristina, My Sister, and Diego Rivera, Frida's husband, also portrayed Cristina Kahlo in his work. Cristina, with whom Rivera had an affair, was painted by Rivera in the nude.

== Personal life ==
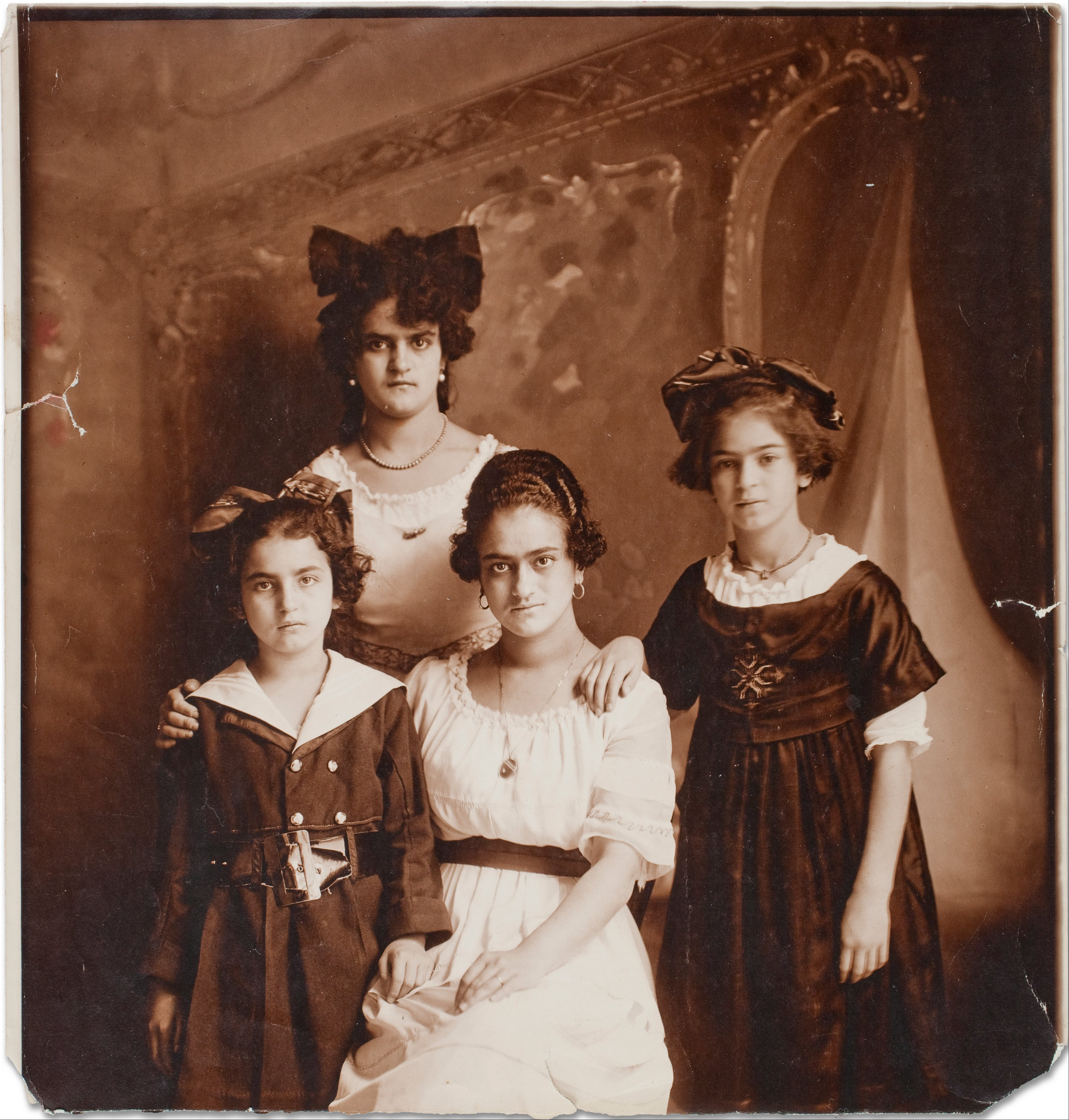
Cristina, Matilde, Adriana and Frida Kahlo (1916)

Cristina Kahlo y Calderón was born June 7, 1908, and was the youngest daughter of the Kahlo family. Her parents were Guillermo Kahlo and Matilde Calderón. Guillermo Kahlo, who worked as a photographer, had a previous marriage in which he had two children before his wife died. Cristina and Frida had two other sisters, named Matilde and Adriana, and two half sisters named María Luisa and Margarita. Cristina was eleven months younger than Frida, and the pair were very close. The Kahlo y Calderón family lived in a house built by Guillermo in Coyoacán, Mexico.

Cristina came from a meager background but her father, Guillermo, a photographer during the Mexican Revolution when there was hardly a market for photographs, provided for her education.

Cristina later married and had two children, Isolda and Antonio. Cristina's abusive husband left her after the birth of Antonio. When Frida and Diego Rivera returned to Mexico as successful painters, Cristina acted as subject for both artists. She was one of Rivera's favorite subjects, and he often painted her in the nude. Soon after her husband left, Cristina and Rivera began an affair.

== Subject of Frida Kahlo ==
Cristina and Frida were very close, and Frida used Cristina as an indirect and direct subject for some of her paintings. Frida painted Portrait of Cristina Kahlo near the start of Frida's career. Art historians note that its style was similar to Diego's. After this painting, Frida was able to find her own stylistic preferences.

In Frida's painting Mi Nodriza y yo ("My wet-nurse and I") Cristina, although not in the painting, is its subject. The painting depicts Frida being breastfed by a wet-nurse as opposed to her own mother, because when Frida's mother became pregnant with Cristina she could no longer breastfeed Frida. Cristina is also an indirect subject of Frida's 1937 painting Memory, the Heart, a self-portrait displaying Frida with a metal rod going through an empty space in her chest. Art historians have suggested that this symbolizes "displacement of penetration." In other words symbolizing Cristina's affair with Diego. The pole replacing her heart, which lies wounded and bleeding on the ground, also shows the immense pain which was the result of the affair.

== Subject of Diego Rivera ==
Rivera portrayed Cristina in his art work, and she was one of his favorite models. Cristina was depicted on the South Wall of Rivera's 1929-1935 mural The History of Mexico: The World of Today and Tomorrow. She lies at the bottom of the mural alongside her children and Frida. This could be an indication of her importance to Rivera. Pairing Frida and Cristina and her children showed the contradictions between the two. Frida appears statuesque while Cristina appears "lively." Another contradiction was the aspect of Cristina being his lover and Frida his wife; also, Cristina had children and Frida did not.

Cristina also appears in Rivera's Figure of Knowledge, in the Ministry of Health. Depicted in the nude, she holds a yonic-shaped flower as a symbol of her femininity. Rivera depicted her in the nude in another mural in the same building, although neither of the nude depictions were meant to be erotic but represented a vision of health and purity.

== Later life ==
Cristina and her children lived with Rivera and Frida as a family. Towards the end of Frida's life, Cristina looked after her and made her as comfortable as possible. After Frida's death, Cristina lived her life separate from Rivera. Rivera turned Cristina and Frida's childhood house La Casa Azul in Coyoacán into a museum of Frida's work, though this did not please Cristina.

The novel Frida (2001) by Bárbara Mujica is narrated from the point of view of Cristina Kahlo.
