= Guillermo Kahlo =

German-Mexican photographer (1871–1941)

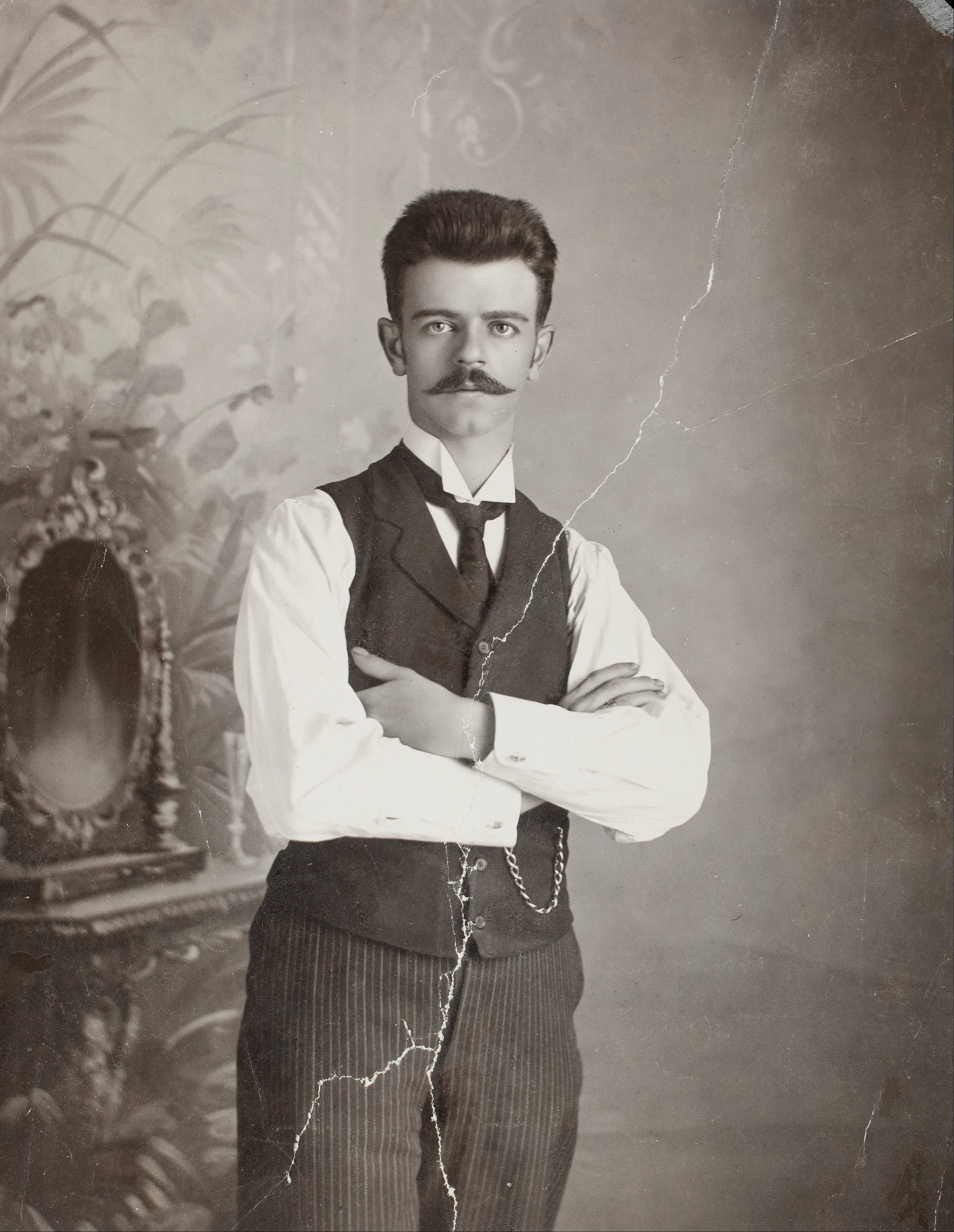
- Kahlo in 1920
- Born: Carl Wilhelm Kahlo; 26 October 1871; Pforzheim, Grand Duchy of Baden, German Empire
- Died: 14 April 1941 (aged 69); Coyoacán, Mexico City, Mexico
- Resting place: Panteón Jardín, Miguel Hidalgo, Mexico City
- Spouses: María Cardeña, Matilde Calderón y González
- Children: 7, including Frida Kahlo and Cristina Kahlo

Guillermo Kahlo (born Carl Wilhelm Kahlo; 26 October 1871 – 14 April 1941) was a German-born Mexican-naturalized photographer. He photographically documented important architectural works, churches, streets, landmarks, as well as industries and companies in Mexico at the beginning of the 20th century; because of this, his work has not only artistic value but also historical and documental importance. He was the father of painter Frida Kahlo.

== Early life and education ==
Kahlo was born in Pforzheim, Grand Duchy of Baden, German Empire (now in Baden-Württemberg, Germany), the son of the jeweller Jakob Heinrich Kahlo and Henriette Kaufmann. His daughter, Frida Kahlo, maintained that he was of Hungarian-Jewish descent. A 2005 book by Gaby Franger and Rainer Huhle traced Kahlo's genealogy and stated that "despite the legend propagated by Frida", Guillermo had not Jewish Hungarian roots but was born to Lutheran parents who "came from families accommodated in Frankfurt and Pforzheim".

He attended the University of Nuremberg. His father paid him to travel to Mexico in 1891, as he did not get along with his stepmother. In Mexico, Wilhelm adopted the Spanish equivalent of his name—"Guillermo". In July 1894, he applied for Mexican citizenship.

== Career ==
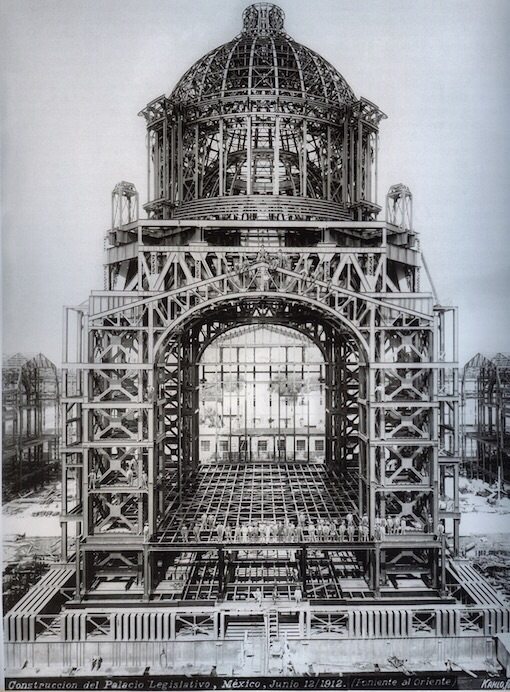
Construcción del Palacio Legislativo, 12 June 1912. The image shows work on the building before it was halted as a result of the Mexican Revolution.

Kahlo's earliest known photograph is from 1897. His first project with Secretary of Finance José Yves Limantour was in 1900. Kahlo usually used large glass plates that measured 8in x 10in to 11in x 14in.

In 1901, he set up a photographic studio, working for El Mundo Ilustrado and Semanario Ilustrado. He was commissioned by the government to do architectural photographs, probably his best work. He also took photographs of churches with other photographers for a six-volume survey in the 1920s. José Vasconcelos published Kahlo's work involving the churches in 1923 through Mexico's Ministry of Education.

== Personal life ==
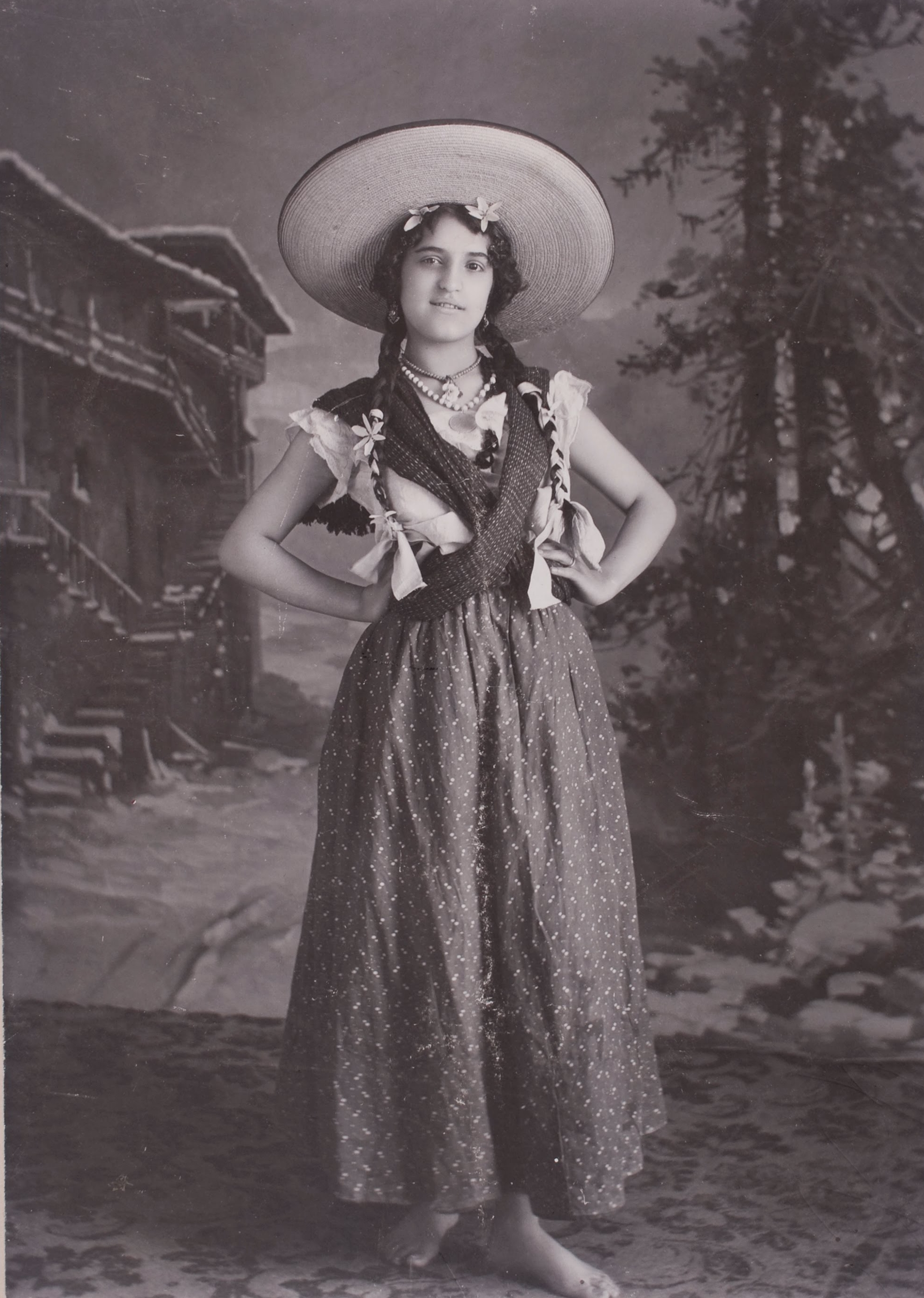
Matilde Calderón y González 1897

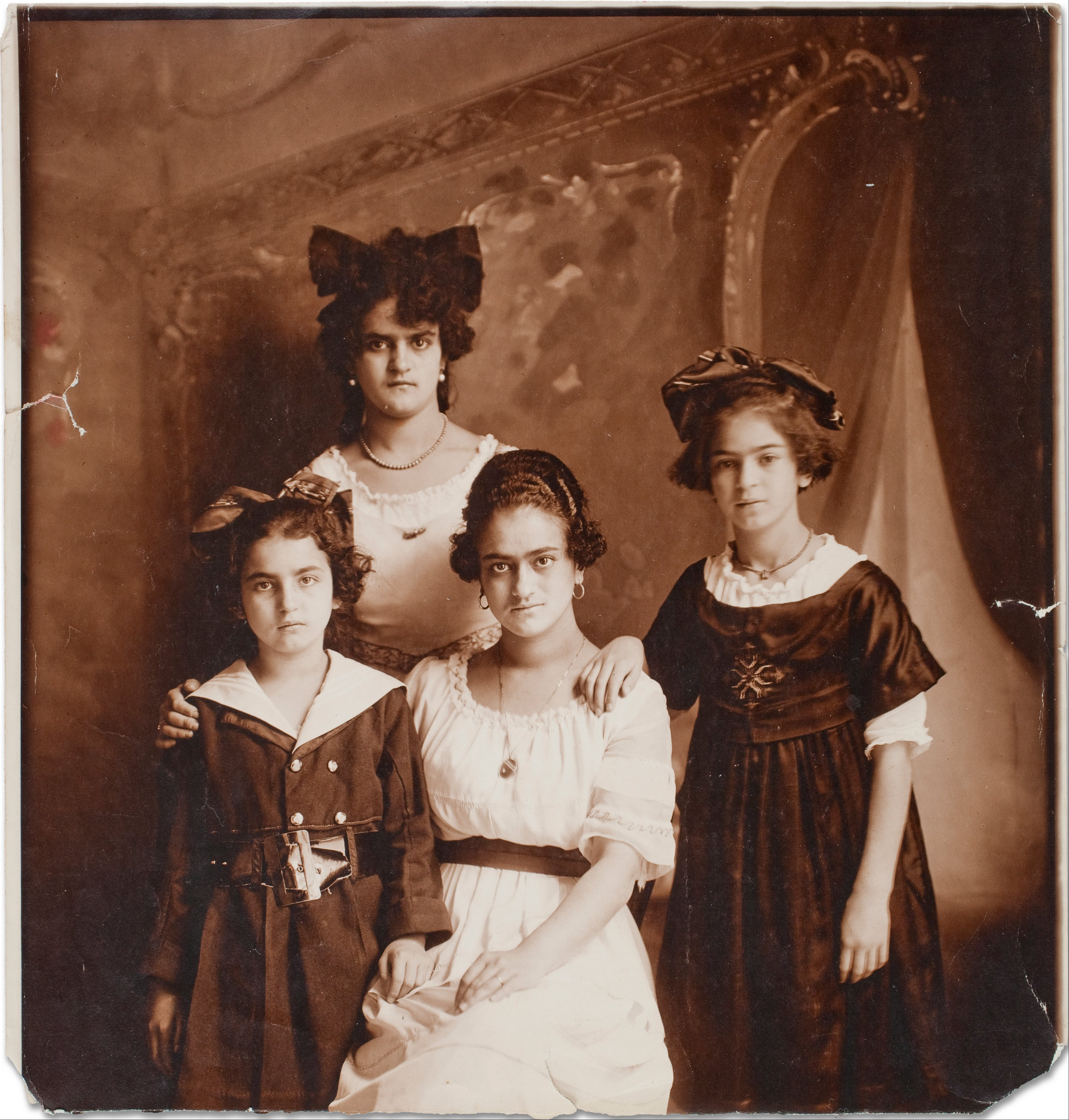
Cristina, Matilde, Adriana and Frida Kahlo 1916

Kahlo married Mexican-born María de los Dolores Eleuteria Clotilde Cardeña Espino in August, 1893. The night she died giving birth to their third child, he asked Antonio Calderón for his daughter Matilde's hand in marriage. After the marriage, Kahlo sent his and María's daughters away to be raised in a convent.

Kahlo and Calderón were the parents of four additional children, including the painter Frida Kahlo and Cristina Kahlo. Cristina was the only one who had children. Frida once commented that, in her childhood, she would sometimes be present when her father suffered from epileptic seizures and would give him aid.

Kahlo died on 14 April 1941 in Coyoacán, Mexico City.

== In popular media ==
Kahlo was played by Roger Rees in the 2002 film Frida.

Kahlo had his portrait painted by his daughter, Frida Kahlo, in 1951, and he was included in the 1950 painting titled Portrait of Frida's Family (Family Tree). Both paintings are located at the Frida Kahlo Museum.

== See also ==
- Porfiriato
- Casa Azul, the family home now known as the Frida Kahlo Museum

== Citations ==
- Coronel Rivera, Juan. et al. Guillermo Kahlo fotógrafo 1872–1941. Vida y obra. CNCA / INBA. México 1993.
