= Frida Kahlo Museum =

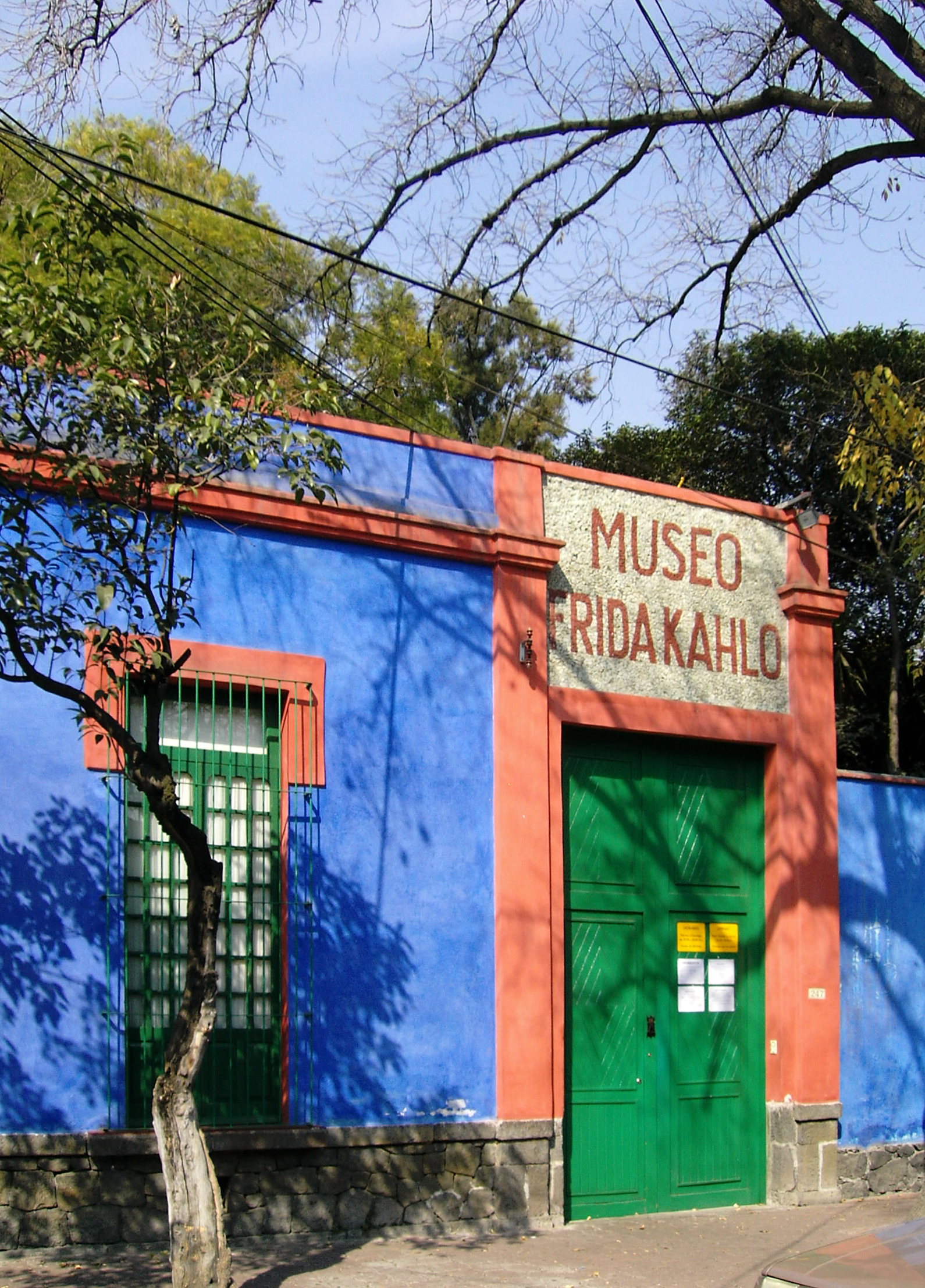
- The blue House in Coyoacan
- Interactive fullscreen map
- Established: 1957
- Location: Mexico City
- Coordinates: 19°21′19″N 99°09′45″W
- Type: Art museum
- Website: museofridakahlo.org.mx

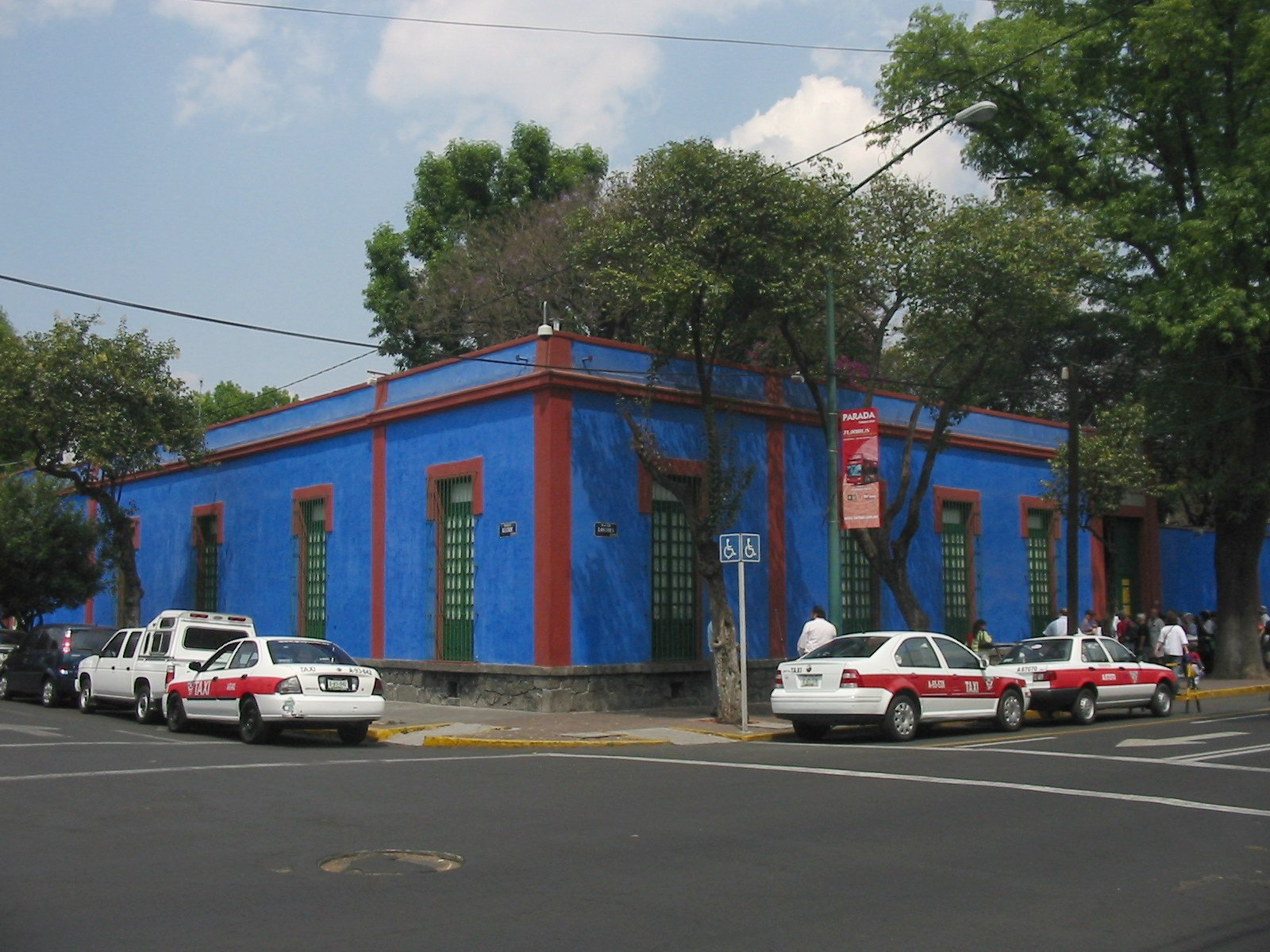
Façade of the house

The Frida Kahlo Museum (Spanish: Museo Frida Kahlo), also known as The Blue House (La Casa Azul) for the structure's cobalt-blue walls, is a historic house museum and art museum dedicated to the life and work of Mexican artist Frida Kahlo. It is in the Colonia del Carmen neighborhood of Coyoacán in Mexico City. The building was Kahlo's birthplace, the home where she grew up, lived with her husband Diego Rivera for a number of years, and where she later died in a room on the upper floor. In 1957, Rivera donated the home and its contents to turn it into a museum in Kahlo's honor.

The museum contains a collection of artwork by Kahlo, Rivera, and other artists, along with the couple's Mexican folk art, pre-Hispanic artifacts, photographs, memorabilia, and personal items. The collection is displayed in the rooms of the house that remains much as it was in the 1950s.

== The Blue House ==
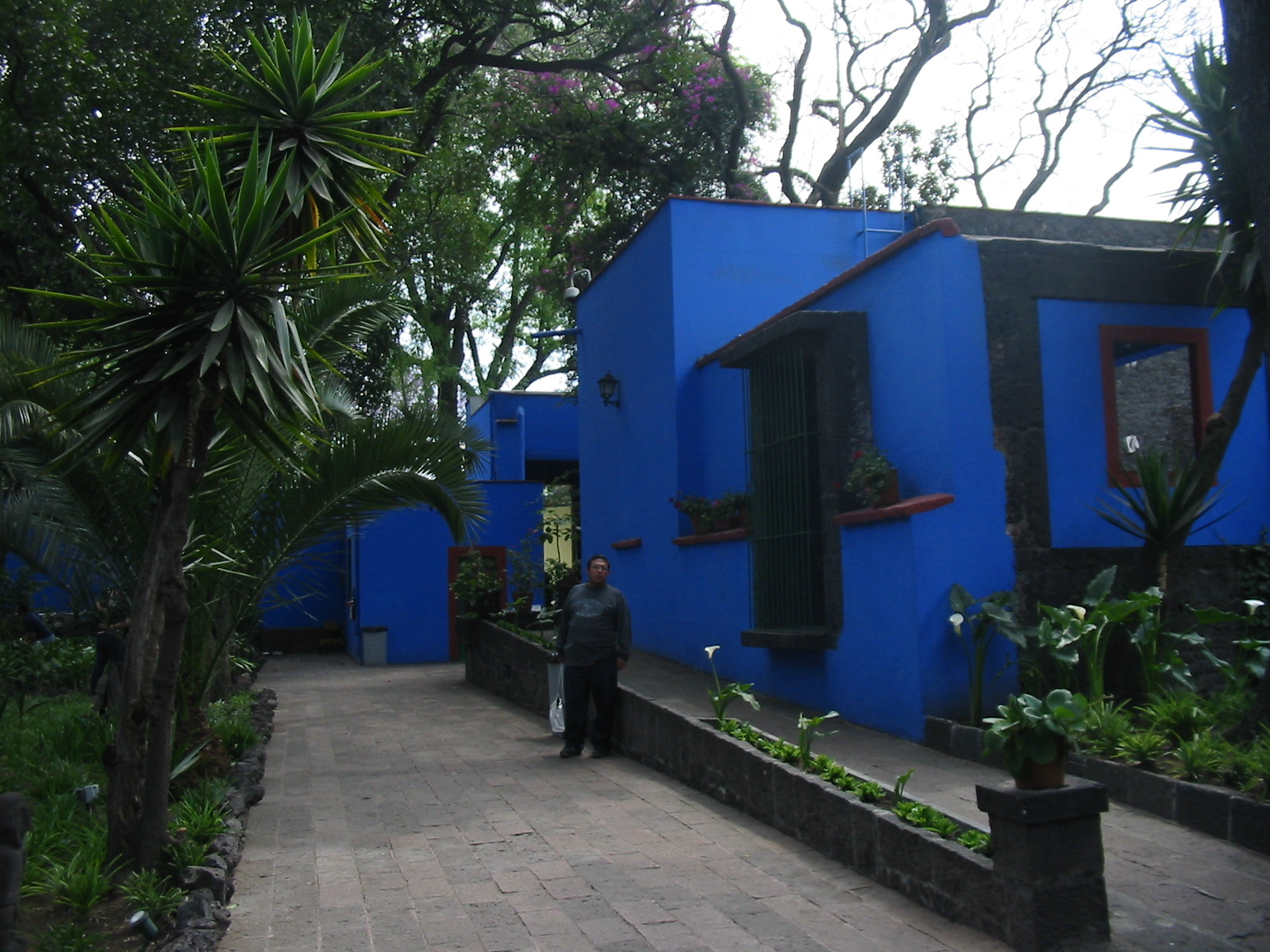
Walkway in the courtyard

The house/museum is located in Colonia del Carmen area of the Coyoacán borough of Mexico City. Coyoacán, especially the Colonia del Carmen area, has had an intellectual and vanguard reputation since the 1920s, when it was the home of Salvador Novo, Octavio Paz, Mario Moreno and Dolores del Río. Today, the area is home of a number of the borough's museums. The house itself is located on the corner of Londres and Allende Streets, and it stands out for its cobalt-blue walls, giving it the name La Casa Azul (The Blue House). Like most of the other structures in the area, the house is built around a central courtyard with garden space, a tradition since colonial times. Originally, the house enclosed only three sides of this courtyard, but later the fourth side was added to enclose it entirely. The house covers 800m^{2} and the central courtyard is another 400m^{2}. As it was built in 1904, it originally had French-style decorative features but later it was changed to the plainer façade seen today. The building has two floors with various bedrooms, studio space, a large kitchen and dining room. The entrance hall was decorated by a mosaic in natural stone by Mardonio Magaña of the Escuela de Pintura al Aire Libre in Coyoacán, inspired by the murals done by Juan O’Gorman at the Ciudad Universitaria.

== Museum ==
Originally the house was the family home of Frida Kahlo, but since 1958, it has served as museum dedicated to her life and work. With about 25,000 visitors monthly, it is one of Mexico City's most-visited museums, and the most-visited site in Coyoacán. The museum is supported solely by ticket sales and donations.

The museum demonstrates the lifestyle of wealthy Mexican bohemian artists and intellectuals during the first half of the 20th century. The entrance ticket to the Casa Azul allows for free entrance into the nearby Anahuacalli Museum, which was also established by Diego Rivera. According to records and testimony, the house today looks much as it did in 1951, decorated with Mexican folk art, Kahlo's personal art collection, a large collection of pre-Hispanic artifacts, traditional Mexican cookware, linens, personal mementos such as photographs, postcards and letters, and works by José María Velasco, Paul Klee, and Diego Rivera. Much of the collection is in display cases designed for their preservation. The museum also contains a café and a small gift shop.

The museum consists of ten rooms. On the ground floor is a room that contains some of Kahlo's mostly minor works such as Frida y la cesárea, 1907–1954, Retrato de familia, 1934, Ruina, 1947, Retrato de Guillermo Kahlo, 1952, El marxismo dará salud, 1954 (showing Frida throwing away her crutches), with a watercolor Diario de Frida in the center. This room originally was the formal living room, where Frida and Diego entertained notable Mexican and international visitors and friends such as Sergei Eisenstein, Nelson Rockefeller, George Gershwin, caricaturist Miguel Covarrubias, and actresses Dolores del Río and María Félix.

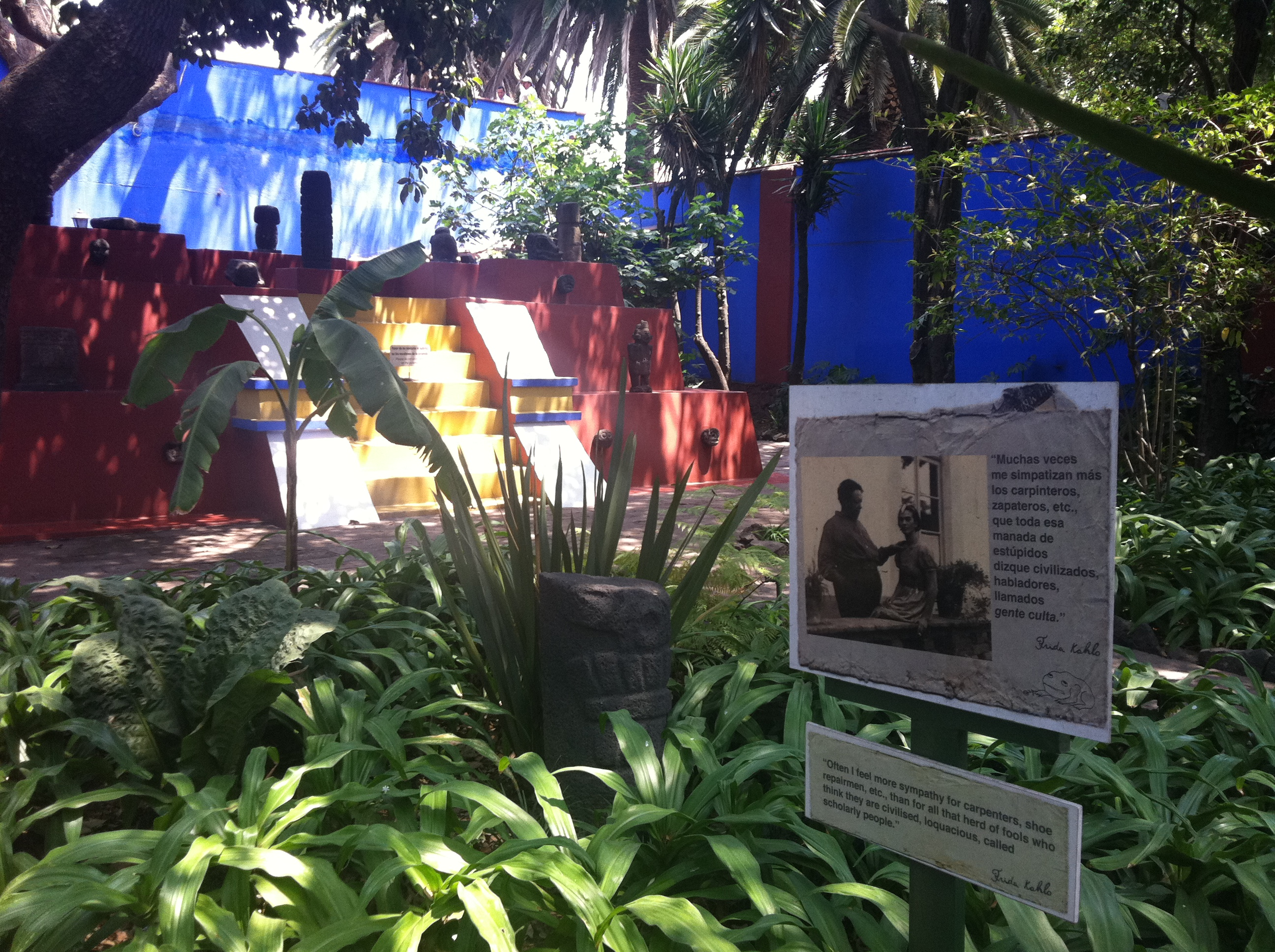
Frida Kahlo Rock

The second and third rooms are dedicated to personal effects and mementos and to some of Rivera's works. The second room is filled with everyday items Frida used, letters, photographs, and notes. On the walls are pre-Hispanic necklaces and folk dresses, especially the Tehuana-style ones that were Frida's trademark. Paintings in the third room include Retrato de Carmen Portes Gil, 1921, Ofrenda del día de muertos, 1943, and Mujer con cuerpo de guitarra, 1916.

The fourth room contains contemporary paintings by artists such as Paul Klee, José María Velasco, Joaquín Clausel, Celia Calderón Orozco, and a sculpture by Mardonio Magaña. The fifth room contains two large Judas figures, "mujeres bonitos" figures from Tlatilco, State of Mexico and figures from the Teotihuacan culture. The large papier-mâché Judas figures and other papier-mâché monsters were traditionally filled with firecrackers and exploded on the Saturday before Easter.

The sixth and seventh rooms are the kitchen and dining room. Both are in classic Mexican style, with bright yellow tile floors, blue and yellow tile counters and a long yellow table, where Frida's stepdaughter Ruth stated that Frida spent much of her time. The two rooms are filled with large earthenware pots, plates, utensils, glassware, and more which came from Metepec, Oaxaca, Tlaquepaque, and Guanajuato, all known for their handcrafted items. Decorative features include papier-mâché Judas skeletons hanging from its ceiling, and walls with tiny pots spelling the names of Frida and Diego next to a pair of doves tying a lovers’ knot.

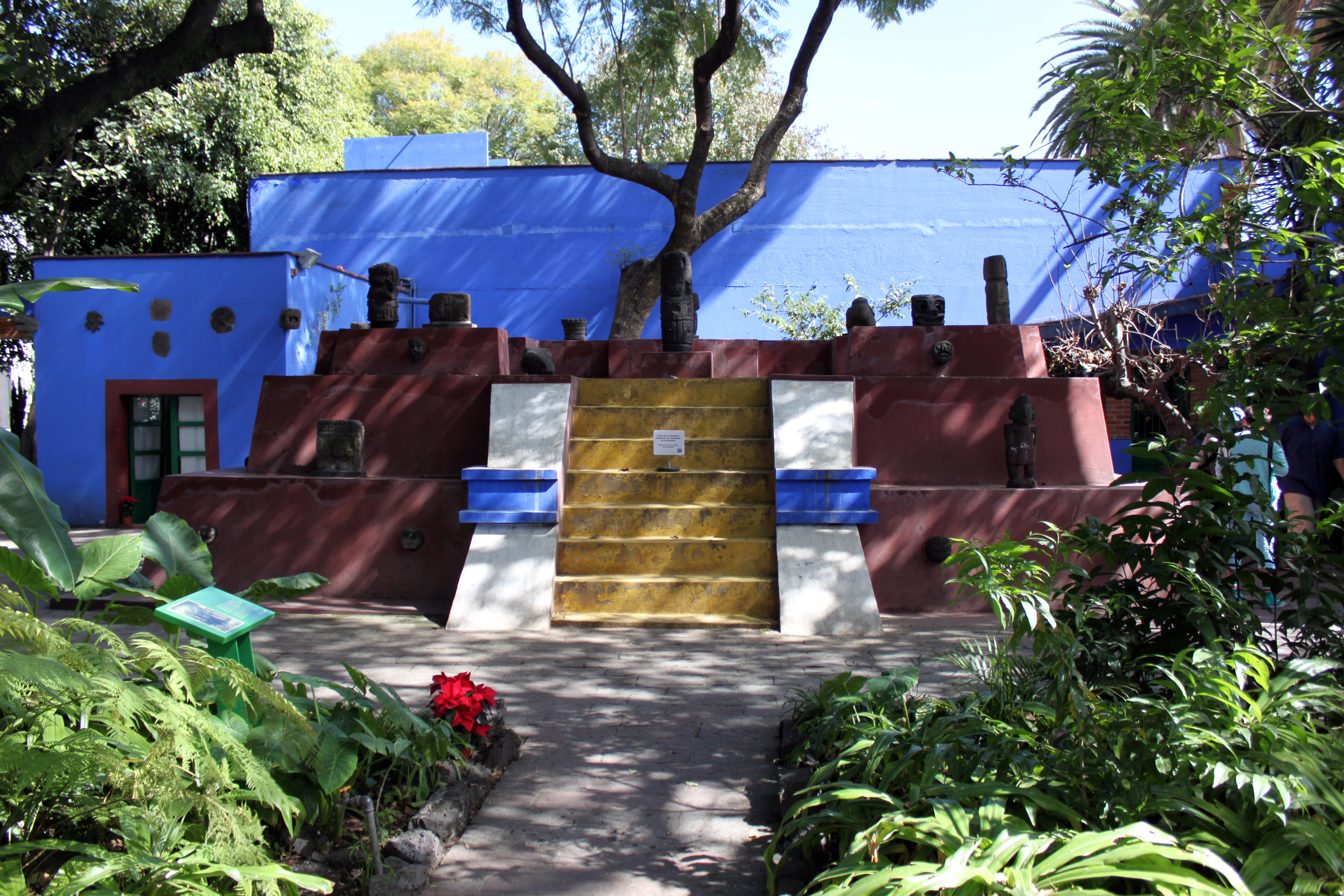
Pyramid in the courtyard displaying pre-Hispanic pieces

Off the dining room was Rivera's bedroom, with his hat, jacket, and work clothes still hanging from a wall rack. Next to this is a stairwell that leads from the courtyard area to the upper floor. This area also contains a large number of folk art items and includes about 2,000 votive paintings from the colonial period to the 20th century, other colonial era work, and more Judas figures.

The two rooms of the upper floor which are open to the public contain Frida's final bedroom and studio area. This is located in the wing that Rivera had built. The original furniture is still there. In one corner, her ashes are on display in an urn, which is surrounded by a funeral mask, some personal items, and mirrors on the ceiling. On her bed is a painted plaster corset she was forced to wear to support her damaged spine, and under the canopy is a mirror facing down which she used to paint her many self-portraits. The head of the bed contains the painting of a dead child, and the foot contains a photo montage of Joseph Stalin, Vladimir Lenin, Karl Marx, Friedrich Engels, and Mao Zedong. The pillow is embroidered with the words "Do not forget me, my love." Her wheelchair is drawn up to an unfinished portrait of Stalin, on an easel which is said was given to her by Nelson Rockefeller. Stalin became a hero to Kahlo after the Red Army victory over Nazi Germany on the Eastern Front in World War II.

The tour of the museum ends at the large courtyard garden which is completely enclosed by the four sides or wings of the structure. The courtyard area is divided by a stepped pyramid, a fountain, and a reflection pool. These were built in the 1940s when Rivera first moved into the house and built the fourth wing enclosing the house. This wing's walls which face the courtyard are decorated with marine shells and mirrors. There are also sculptures by Mexican artist Mardonio Magaña. One side of the courtyard contains the inscription "Frida y Diego / vivieron en / esta casa / 1929–1954" (Frida and Diego lived in this house – 1929–1954).

== History ==
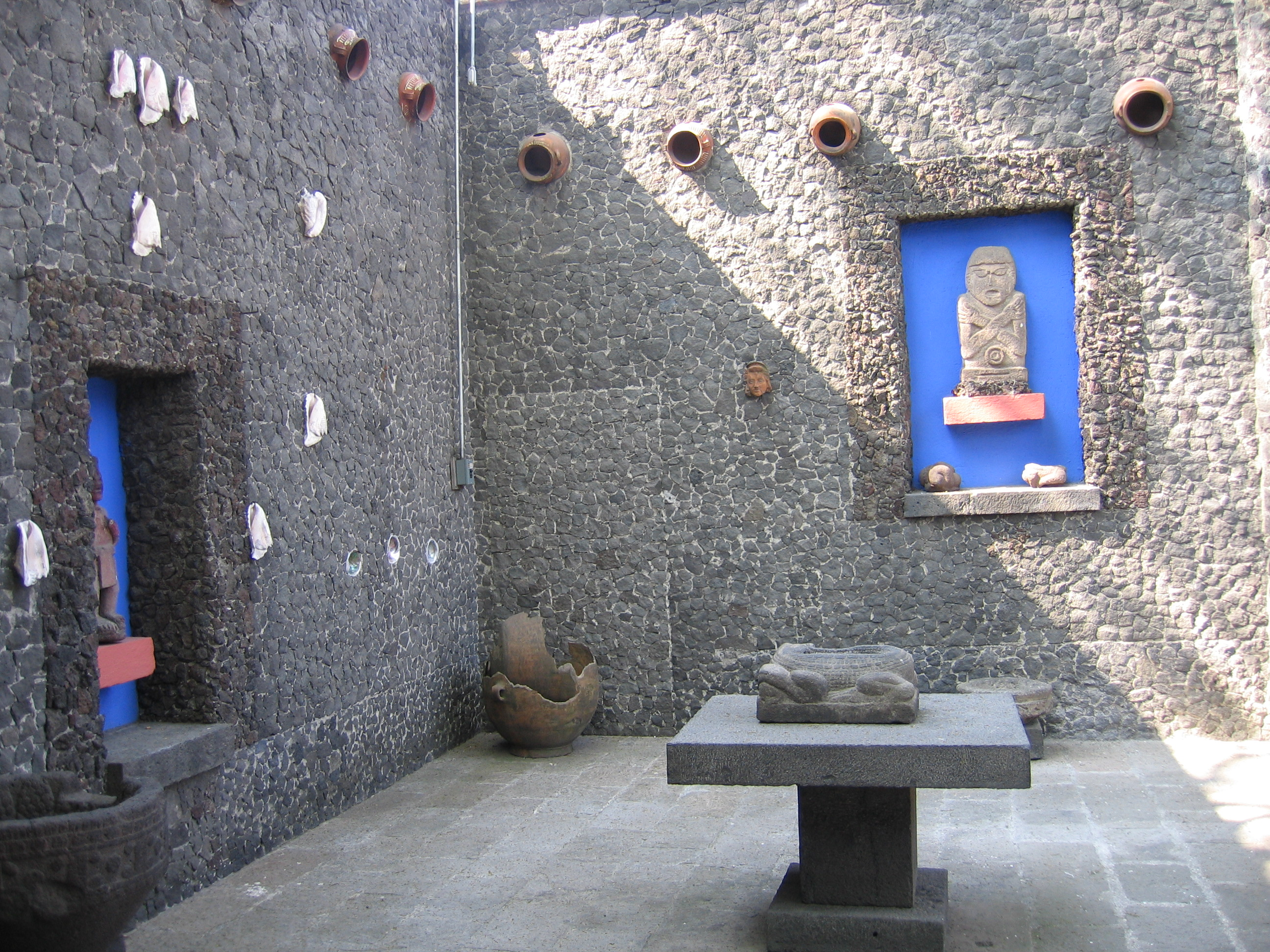
New section or wing added on by Diego Rivera in volcanic stone and encrusted shells

The house was constructed in 1904 in Colonia Del Carmen in Coyoacán, which was established on lands that belonged to the former Hacienda del Carmen, a property of the Carmelites in the colonial period. At that time and during the first half of the 20th century, Coyoacán was officially part of the Federal District of Mexico City, but was still relatively rural and separate from Mexico City's urban sprawl. Since the late 19th century, a number of Mexico City's wealthy had built country homes in the area, often imitating the colonial designs of the past. Colonia del Carmen became popular with artists and intellectuals starting around the 1920s, due to the promotion of it by Francisco Sosa and the establishment of the Escuela de Pintura al Aire Libre (Open Air School of Painting) at the former San Pedro Mártir Hacienda in 1923. Originally, the exterior of the house was decorated in a French-inspired motif, which was popular in Mexico in the late 19th and early 20th centuries.

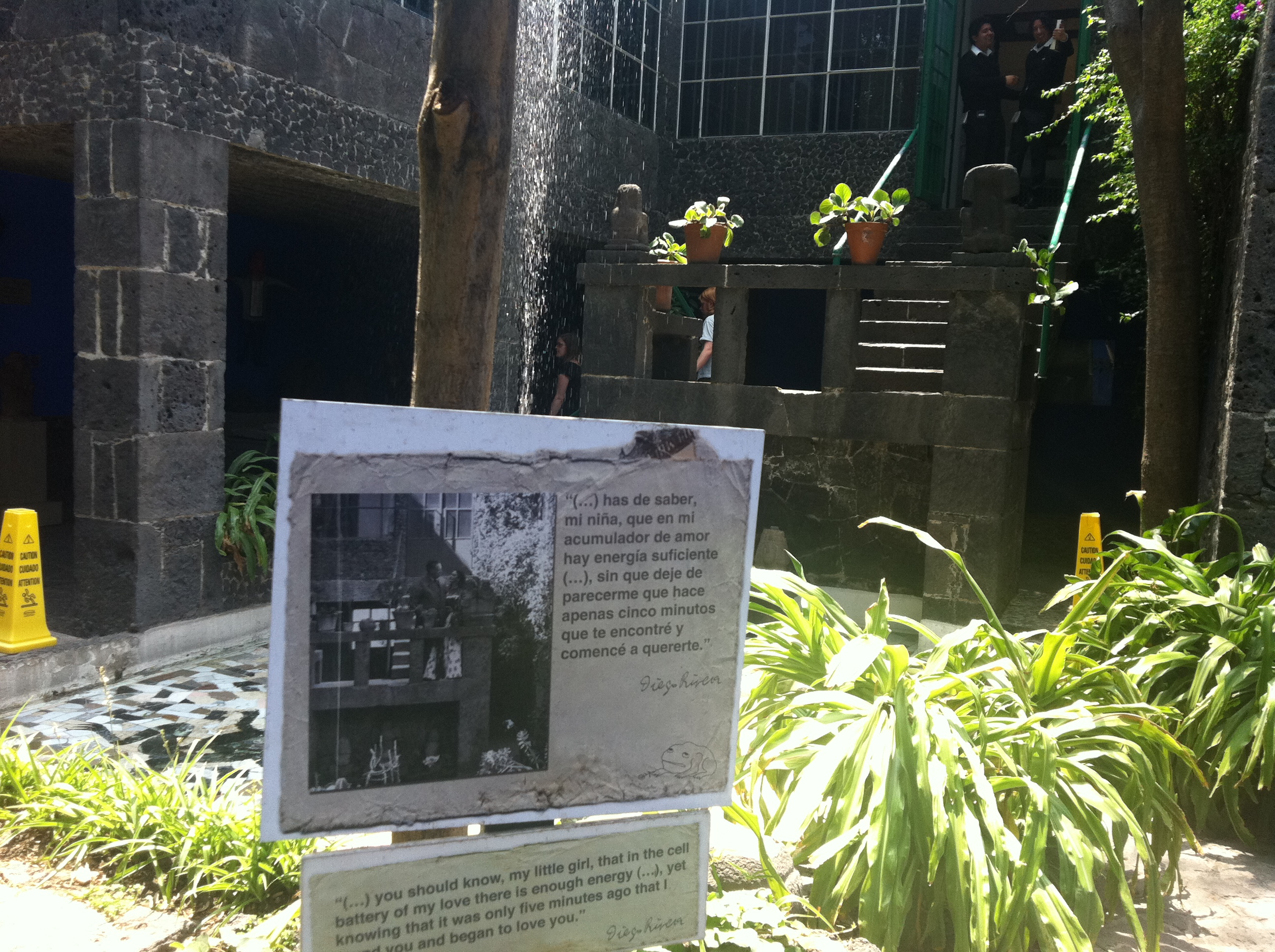
"(...) you should know, my little girl, that in the cell battery of my love there is enough energy (...), yet knowing that it was only five minutes ago that I found you and began to love you." – Diego Rivera

Frida Kahlo was born in this house in 1907, and it remained her family home throughout her life. She spent her last thirteen years of it here as well. Frida was the daughter of Wilhelm (Guillermo) Kahlo, who immigrated from Europe to Mexico and native Mexican Matilde Calderón y González. Frida spent her childhood in this house. She stated that during the Mexican Revolution, her mother would open the windows of this house to donate supplies to the Zapata army when it was in the area in 1913. She also spent large amount of time in the house convalescing, first in 1918 when she was struck with polio which would leave one leg shorter than the other. When she was 18, a trolley accident left her badly mangled. She spent about two years confined to her bed in casts and orthopedic devices. It was then she began to paint as a way to pass the time. One of the works from this time has Frida on what appears to be a stretcher, her body bandaged and located to the side of this house. Frida met Diego Rivera while he was painting murals at the Secretaria de Educacion Publica building and invited him to the Casa Azul to see her work. Rivera soon began to be a regular visitor to the house. Other notable artists followed, making the house one of the area's meeting places. After marrying Rivera, Frida moved from her childhood home to an apartment on Paseo de la Reforma, but Rivera paid off the family's mortgage on the Casa Azul. For most of the 1930s, Frida lived in other places in Mexico City or abroad, but visited her family in the home frequently and it appears in a painting done in 1936 called Mis abuelos, mis padres y yo also called Arbol genealógico.

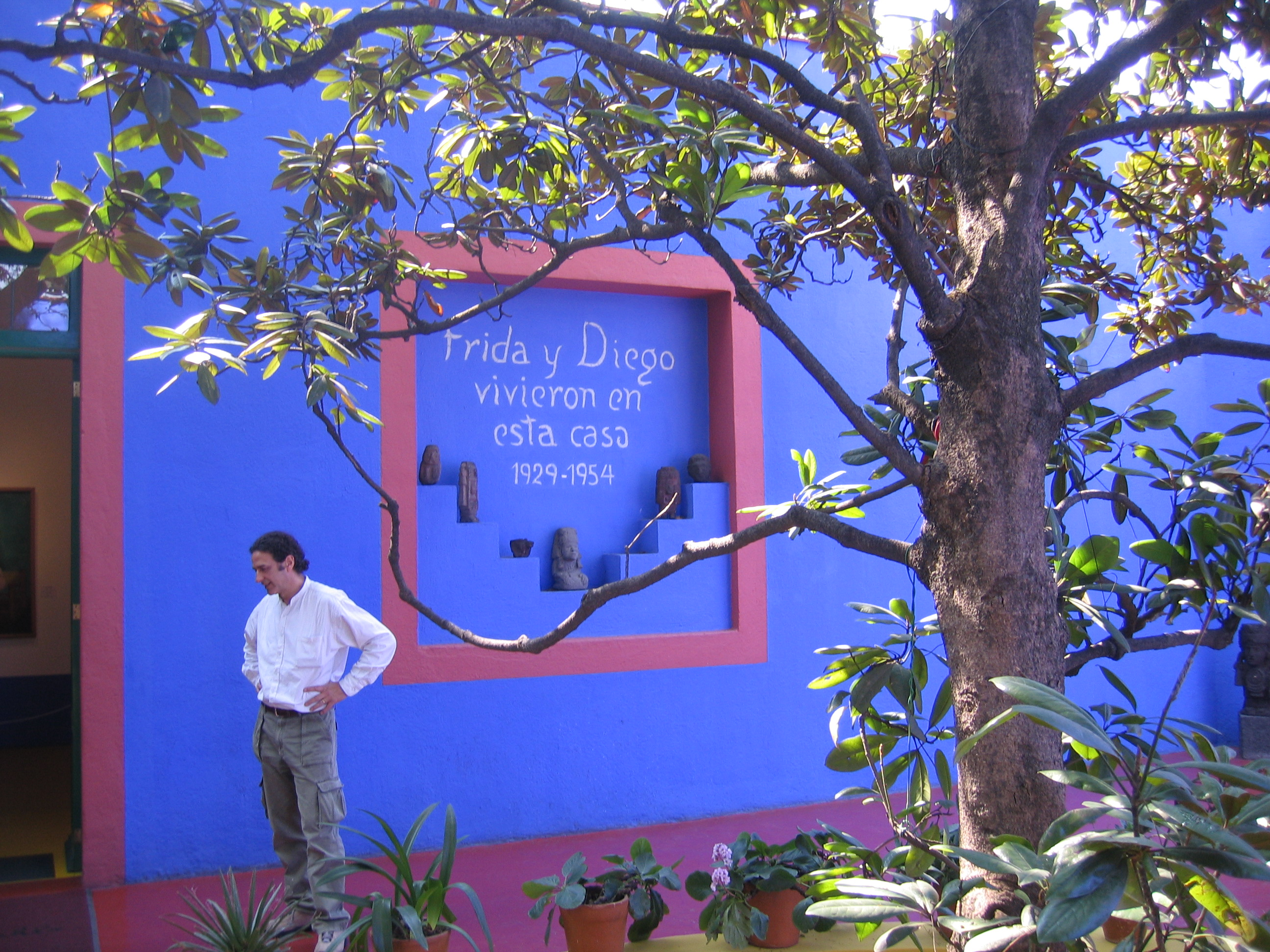
Inscription on wall that says that Frida and Diego lived at the house.

Because of intervention by Kahlo and Rivera, Russian Leon Trotsky obtained asylum in Mexico. Trotsky and his wife, Natalia Sedova, were first housed in La Casa Azul starting in January 1937. The windows facing the street were closed in with adobe bricks for Trotsky's safety as he was under a death sentence from Stalin. A high wall was built between this house and the adjoining one as well. From January 1937 to April 1939, Trotsky lived and worked here, writing treatises such as Su moral y la nuestra and his regular political articles. This would often cause security problems in the area, due to the hostility of Trotsky's political enemies. During all of this time, the house continued to be a meeting place for intellectuals, especially those associated with Communism. In April 1939, Trotsky and Sedova left the Blue House after Trotsky had a falling out with Rivera over ideology and Rivera's criticism of Trotsky's writings, moving to a nearby house on Viena Street.

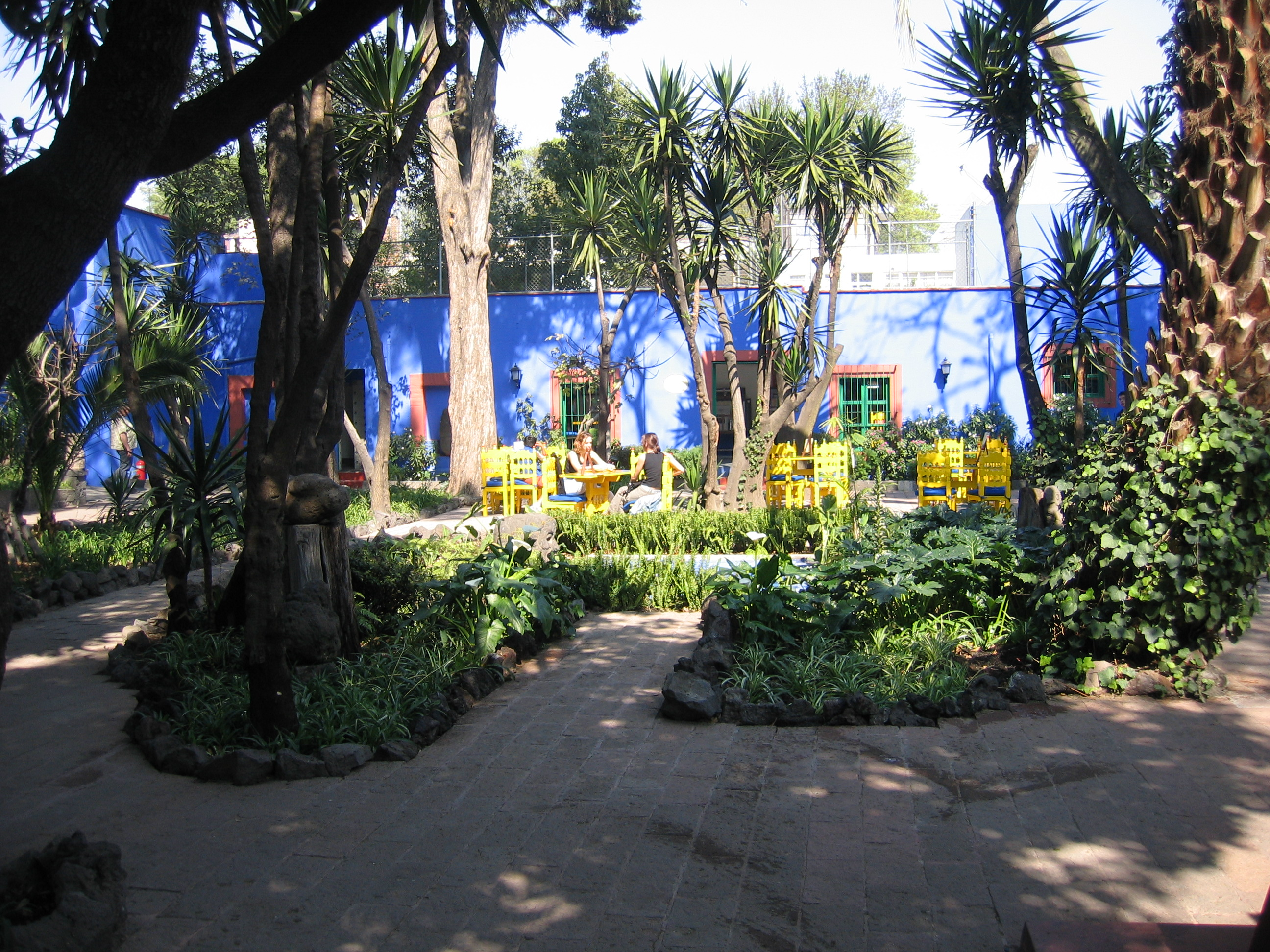
Garden courtyard of The Blue House—Museo Frida Kahlo, in Mexico City.

Rivera and Kahlo divorced in November 1939. However, the couple did not break all contact, and they remarried in December 1940. In 1941, just before Frida's father's death, Rivera moved into the house, although he maintained another residence in San Angel. During this time, Rivera constructed the wing which faces Londres Street and encloses the courtyard completely. This section was built of local volcanic rock with ceramic vases set into it. A terraced roof was built, decorated with marine shells and a mirror. Here Frida's studio and bedroom was moved. To separate the new from the old, a stone wall divides the patio area in two, in front of which is a fountain, a stepped pyramid, a reflection pool and a room for the couple's archeological collection. The exterior was also changed from the original French style to the one seen today. The redesign work on the house was done by Juan O’Gorman in 1946. As the couple's home, the house continued to receive distinguished visitors from both Mexico and abroad, including Fritz Henle, Concha Michel, Dolores del Río, María Félix, Lucha Reyes and Chavela Vargas.

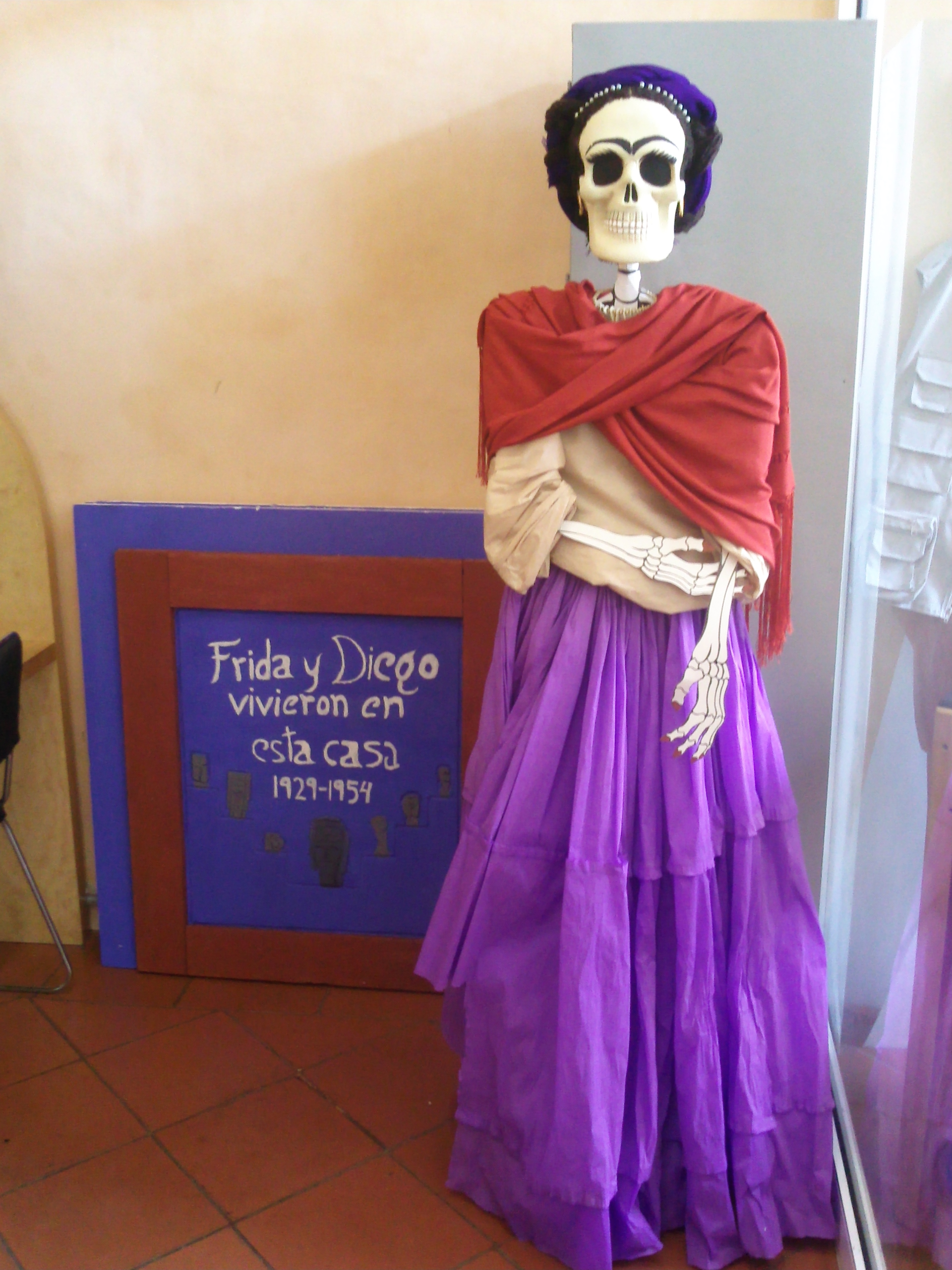
Image of Frida for Day of the Dead at the museum

In 1943, Frida became an instructor for the Escuela de Pintura y Escultura de La Esmeralda, but her physical condition required her to mostly give classes at her home. These students eventually numbered only four and were called "Los fridos": Fanny Rabel, Guillermo Monroy, Arturo "el Güero" Estrada and Arturo García Bustos, who mostly worked and trained in the patio area. Starting in 1945, Frida was once again confined to bed in the house. From then to 1947, she painted works such as Flor de la vida in 1945, and El sol de la vida in 1947.

Frida died on the upper floor of this house on 13 July 1954 at the age of 47. Her wake took place here before the body was taken to the Palacio de Bellas Artes then cremated. Four years after her death, in 1958, Rivera donated the house to the nation of Mexico and set up a foundation for its preservation. The house was converted to a museum dedicated to the life and works of Kahlo. The first director of the museum was Carlos Pellicer with the mandate to keep the house as it was.

The museum was relatively obscure for many years as Frida Kahlo was little known beyond the art world until the 1990s. In the 1980s, a movement called Neomexicanismo promoted her and her work. Since that time, she has become a cult icon, with images of her appearing on many pop culture items, and many of her works now command high prices. In 2006, Kahlo's 1943 painting Roots set a US$5.6 million auction record for a Latin American work. The popularity of Frida affected the museum. It closed for a time in the early 1990s, then reopened in 1993, with the addition of a gift shop and restaurant/café. Today, the museum is the most-visited in Coyoacán and one of the most visited in Mexico City.

Restoration work was performed on the building and some of its contents in 2009 and 2010. The work was sponsored in part by the German government, which donated 60,000 euros for the effort, and in part by the museum itself, which contributed one million pesos. The effort concentrates on obtaining furniture for display and preservation, other equipment, roof work, and restoration of items in the collection. Restoration includes most of the paintings in the collection, including Viva la vida, El marxismo dará salud a los enfermos, Frida y la cesárea, Naturaleza muerta con bandera, Retrato de Marta Procel, Retrato de mi familia, Retrato de mi padre Wilhelm Kahlo and Los hornos de ladrillos as well as La quebrada and Paisaje urbano by Rivera, Retrato del niño Don Antonio Villaseñor and Retrato de niño muerto by unknown author, Composición by Wolfgang Paalenk, and Retrato de Diego Rivera by Leopold Gottlieb, along with an archive of 6,500 photographs of Kahlo, Rivera with the friends, family and colleagues done by Nickolas Muray, Martin Munkácsi, Fritz Henle and Gisele Freund. The conservation work only covers about 35 percent of the total collection.

== See also ==
- Cristina Kahlo, Frida's younger sister, who lived in the house during much of the time that Frida did.
- Anahuacalli Museum
- List of single-artist museums
- List of historic house museums in Mexico
- List of paintings by Frida Kahlo
