= List of historic house museums in Mexico =

This is a list of historic house museums in Mexico. They are the birthplaces and/or death places of some Mexican public figures. Some preserve the original structure, and others are near-exact replicas.

Name	Image	Location	Summary
Borda House		Cuauhtémoc, Mexico City	The house of José de la Borda.
Casa de Benito Juárez		San Pablo Guelatao, Oaxaca	Replica of Juárez's birthplace.
Casa de Emiliano Zapata		Anenecuilco, Morelos	The original birthplace of Emiliano Zapata, in ruins but preserved by a protective roof. Built by his father Gabriel Zapata somewhere between 1857 and 1861.
Casa de José María Morelos y Pavón		Morelia, Morelos	The original birthplace of José María Morelos y Pavón.
Casa de Pancho Villa		La Coyotada, San Juan del Río, Durango	Located on the banks of the Río San Juan, it is the birthplace of Mexican Revolution hero Pancho Villa. It contains the same adobe walls, and has been preserved by encasing its walls in concrete.
Casa de Santo Toribio Romo		Santa Ana de Guadalupe, Jalostotitlán, Jalisco	Replica of the birthplace of Cristero War hero Toribio Romo González.
Casa Museo Leonora Carrington		Cuauhtémoc, Mexico City	The house and studio of Leonora Carrington.
Frida Kahlo Museum		Coyoacán, Mexico City	The birthplace of Frida Kahlo.
Leon Trotsky House Museum		Coyoacán, Mexico City	The death place of Leon Trotsky.
Luis Barragán House and Studio		Coyoacán, Mexico City	The death place of Luis Barragán.
Museo Casa de Morelos		Ecatepec de Morelos, State of Mexico	The death place of José María Morelos y Pavón.
Museo Dolores Olmedo		Xochimilco, Mexico City	The house of Dolores Olmedo.
