= Fritz Henle =

German photographer

Self-portrait of Henle, c. 1938

Fritz Henle (June 9, 1909 – January 31, 1993) was a German-born photographer, known as "Mr. Rollei" for his use of the 2.25" square format film used in the Rolleiflex camera. Called, "the last classic freelance photographer" by photohistorian, Helmut Gernsheim, he had a career spanning more than 60 years, during which he amassed an archive of more than 110,000 negatives, representing images of Europe, India, Japan, Hawai, the United States, Mexico, and the Caribbean.

== Life ==
Henle was born in Dortmund, Germany in 1909. He initially studied physics, before entering the Bayerische Staatslehranstalt fϋr Lichtbildwesen de (Bavarian State College for Photography) in Munich. Having completed his studies he spent a year photographing works of art in Florence. During 1934 he travelled all over Italy, taking pictures for the Lloyd steamship line, and in 1935–6 he visited China and Japan. In 1936 he carried out an assignment for Time-Life, and his pictures were published in Fortune magazine. He later visited the United States, his connections to Life magazine eventually facilitating his emigration to the country. He became a US citizen in 1942, and moved to Saint Croix in the Virgin Islands in 1958.

Henle photographed fashion, portrait, travel and industrial subjects and his work was published by Life, Mademoiselle, and Harper's Bazaar magazines.

He died in Saint Croix, U.S. Virgin Islands in 1993

An exhibition called "Fritz Henle: In Search of Beauty", marking the centenary of his birth, was held at the Harry Ransom Humanities Research Center at The University of Texas at Austin in 2009.

== Books ==
- Fritz Henle's Guide to Rollei Photography (1956)
- The Caribbean; a Journey With Pictures, Fritz Henle and P. E. Knapp (1957)
- Fritz Henle: In Search of Beauty, Harry Ransom Humanities Research Center, Roy Flukinger and Fritz Henle (2009) ISBN 978-0-292-71972-9
