= Eli Lotar =

French photographer and filmmaker (1905–1969)

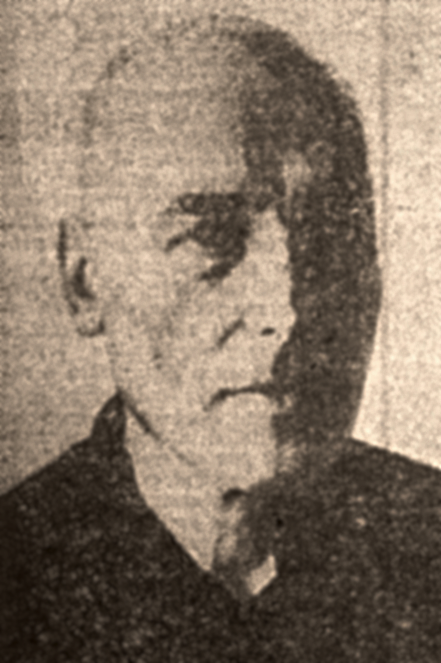
- Lotar c. 1968
- Born: Eliazar Lotar Theodorescu; 30 January 1905; 18th arrondissement of Paris, France
- Died: 10 May 1969 (aged 64); Latin Quarter, Paris, France
- Citizenship: Romanian; French (from 1928)
- Occupations: Studio photographer, photojournalist, filmmaker, actor
- Years active: 1925–1969
- Spouse: Elisabeth Makovska (m. 1938, separated)
- Partner: Germaine Krull
- Parents: Tudor Arghezi (father); Constanța "Sonia" Zissu (mother)
- Relatives: Mitzura Arghezi (half-sister); Baruțu T. Arghezi (half-brother)

Eli Lotar (first name also Ely or Elie, last name also Lothar; born Eliazar or Eleazar Lotar Theodorescu; 30 January 1905 – 10 May 1969) was a French and Romanian photographer, cinematographer and film director. The eldest son of writer Tudor Arghezi, his mother was the schoolteacher and poet Constanța Zissu, who got pregnant with Arghezi when the latter was a monk in the Romanian Orthodox Church; Arghezi recognized him, and, upon being defrocked, married Zissu. Eliazar was cared for by his father and stepmother in Bucharest, becoming a resentful and rebellious child. He was reunited with Constanța after the World War I division of Romania, when she took him to Iași. He then attended Saint Sava National College, but often ran away to rejoin Zissu. Upon her death, he still rejected Arghezi's tutelage, and, before the end of 1924, fled to Paris.

Almost exclusively known abroad as "Eli Lotar", he tried to build his career as an actor, only landing a small part in Jacques Feyder's Carmen. He was taken in as a lover and apprentice by the art photographer Germaine Krull, and through her joined the Parisian avant-garde—also breaking into photojournalism at Vu magazine. By 1927, Lotar was a respected photographer, though still largely imitative of Krull and László Moholy-Nagy, doing unit stills for directors such as Henri Desfontaines and Nikolai Malikoff. His stylistic emancipation began when he joined dissident surrealists like Roger Vitrac, Antonin Artaud, and Georges Bataille. The latter featured his stark images of slaughterhouses in Documents magazine, using them to illustrate his own discourse on the sanitized cruelty at the heart of human experiences. Lotar debuted as a cameraman under Alberto Cavalcanti's direction, and afterwards specialized in camera work for documentary films—in acclaimed collaborations with Vitrac, Joris Ivens, Jacques Brunius, and Jean Painlevé.

A student of Marxism, passionate about working-class struggles, Lotar aligned himself with the French Communist Party. In 1932, he engaged in political work alongside documentarian Yves Allégret, with whom he tried to visit and film the destitute communities of Las Hurdes, in Republican Spain. They were stopped in Andalusia by hostile crowds; they went to Tenerife, making a documentary piece for Pathé. Lotar only reached Las Hurdes in 1933, alongside Luis Buñuel and Pierre Unik. The three-man team created Land Without Bread, regarded as both a significant milestone in the genre and a subject of political controversies. Lotar also took a sailing trip around the planet in 1934—alongside his creative partner Jacques-André Boiffard, he provided photographic records of destitution in French Morocco. He continued to work on various projects, mainstream as well as avant-garde and political, throughout the 1930s, becoming celebrated for his artistic vision; he remained in Vichy France during most of the 1940s, joining the resistance networks. He fled to Switzerland in 1944, and found employment with Skira publishers.

Though commissioned to him by his communist contacts, Lotar's 1946 documentary on life in Aubervilliers was widely held as a masterpiece in line with Italian neorealism. It is his only surviving project as a director, and his final experience of success. He continued to film in various locations, from Socialist Poland to colonial Cameroon, but was ignored by critics and filmmakers, and openly condemned by Buñuel as a traitor to communism. Arghezi was similarly shunned, but then rehabilitated, in communized Romania; Lotar made several trips back to Bucharest after 1956, reconnecting with his father and half-siblings. Increasingly erratic and improvident, struggling with alcoholism, he failed to relaunch his career in Romania; in his final work, he did portraits of Alberto Giacometti, who reciprocated with three busts (one of which is Giacometti's last sculpture). Eliazar outlived Arghezi by less than two years, thus failing to benefit from Arghezian royalties. His own contributions, amounting to some 9,000 photographs, were rediscovered and catalogued by Centre Pompidou in the 1990s. A selection was first shown in Bucharest in 2019.

== Biography ==
=== Origin and early childhood ===
Eliazar Lotar Theodorescu was born in Paris' 18th arrondissement on 30 January 1905. His mother, the Romanian schoolteacher Constanța "Sonia" Zissu, had traveled there specifically to give birth; she had been impregnated out-of-wedlock by Arghezi (Ion Nae Theodorescu), who, at the time, was a monk at Cernica Monastery. In a September 1905 letter to his friend, the writer and priest Gala Galaction, Arghezi spoke of the circumstances as follows:

[Eliazar's] mother is no friend of mine [...] on one priceless evening, we loved each other under the tinsel of the moon, as two strong youths possessed by an ideal, to such infinity that the boy produced by such a solemnity could only have come out with a large forehead.

Arghezi himself had an obscured, and for long mysterious, origin and ethnic heritage: his father, Nae Theodorescu, was a Romanian pastry-cook and merchant from Oltenia; his mother was a Hungarian (Székely) maid, Rozalia Ergézi, whose very existence was later concealed by Arghezi. Authors such as Paul Cernat assume that Constanța Zissu was the sister of a Jewish community leader and writer, A. L. Zissu. This interpretation is contradicted by archival research, which traced her lineage to an Orthodox and ethnic Romanian family, centered on Pitești. This was once attested by Arghezi, who reported that Eliazar's maternal aunt was comedienne Romanitza Manolescu, noted in Paris for her wolf-whistling act.

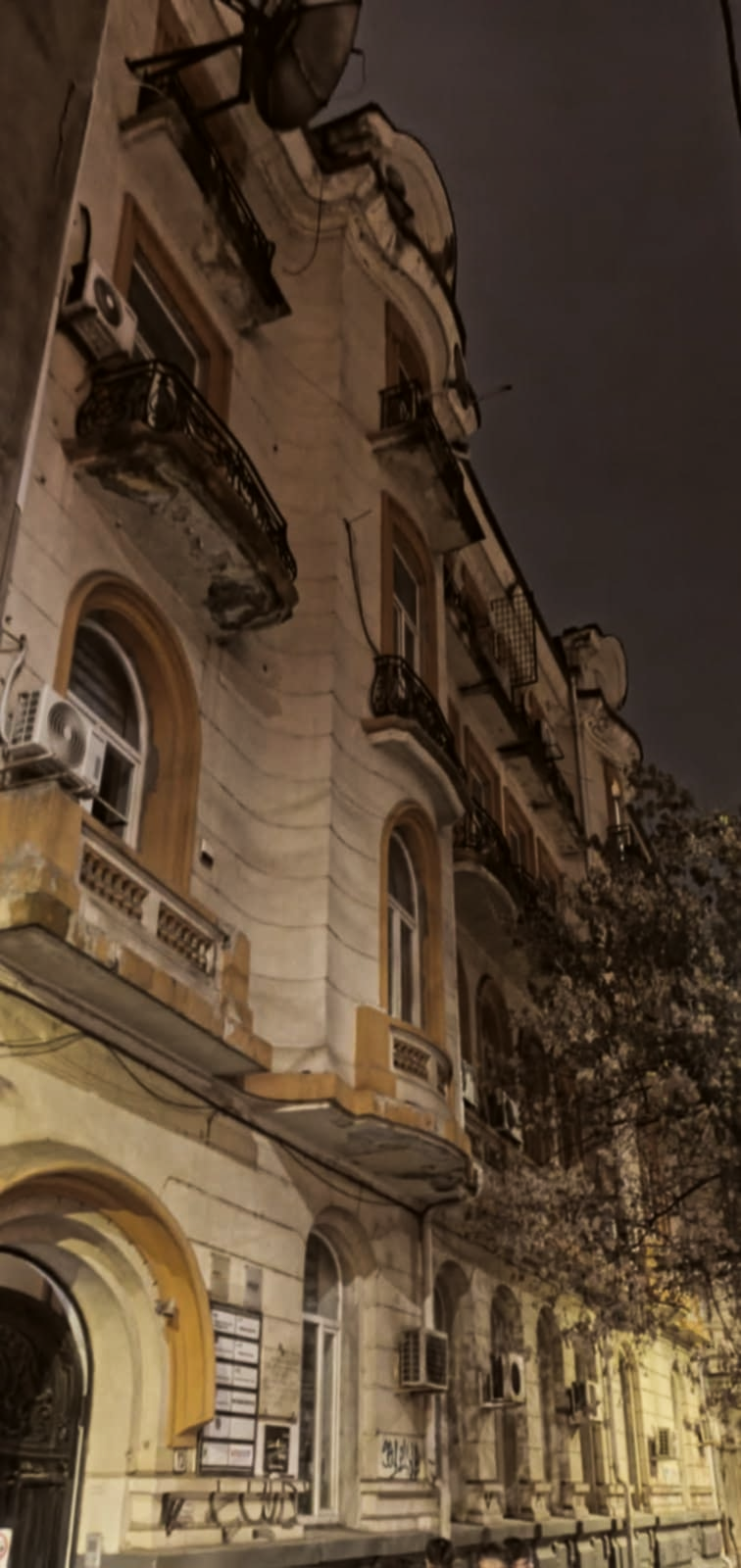
Apartment building at No. 12 Kogălniceanu Boulevard (formerly No 62 Elisabeta Boulevard), where Lotar lived as a child and adolescent

Eliazar's mother had first cultivated her literary ambitions within a circle of progressive intellectuals, formed around Adevărul daily, where she and Manolescu befriended painter Cecilia Cuțescu-Storck. Constanța was highly educated, having graduated from the University of Bucharest's Natural Sciences Department in January 1900. As noted by researcher Pavel Țugui, she most likely met Arghezi while serving as his substitute teacher at the Cliniciu–Popa Boys' Institute, where the monk had been allowed to study for his Romanian baccalaureate. She did not want to risk her government job by having the details of her pregnancy leaked. Accounts differ as to what happened when Eliazar was a newborn. Author István Ferenczes believes that she abandoned Eliazar with a Parisian wet nurse, and he is in any case believed by Arghezi to have been "near Paris, sleeping on some foreign arm", in September 1905. Țugui argues that the baby was in Bucharest, with his Zissu grandparents, in late 1905—before Constanța began to consider giving him up for adoption. In early 1906, he was baptized Orthodox by Galaction. The poet recovered his son, leaving him to be raised by Rozalia (known to him as "Maria"); throughout his childhood, which saw his father leaving him behind as he went on an extended trip to Switzerland (1906–1910), Eliazar remained especially close to her. He once confessed to his friend, Eugen Jebeleanu, that, thanks to Rozalia, he could speak both Romanian and Hungarian as a child.

Eliazar's parents were not on friendly terms by 1909, when Arghezi informed Rozalia "Maria" that he would only marry a homemaker—having been disgusted by intellectual women. In 1910, however, Arghezi and Zissu had reconciled: she was allowed to take Eliazar to Switzerland, where he was reunited with Arghezi. His parents eventually agreed to legalize their relationship, which was made possible once Arghezi had been defrocked in January 1912; they were married in October of that year, when she became "Constanța N. Theodorescu", and moved into the Zissu home at No. 1 Vestei Street. Arghezi was almost immediately put off by her spending and her feminist outlook, moving out to an apartment at No. 62 Elisabeta Boulevard, and taking Eliazar with him. He later depicted the marriage as lasting only 24 hours, and being performed only as a formal service to Eliazar. The couple were in fact only divorced in February 1914, with Arghezi granted full custody over the boy. Returning to her maiden name, Constanța published a selection of her own poems—including some that were ostensibly written for her former lover and husband. By March 1916, she was a contributor to Eugenia de Reuss Ianculescu's feminist journal, Drepturile Femeii.

=== Runaway and emigrant ===
Eliazar lived with Arghezi in Bucharest throughout the early stages of World War I, when Romania was still neutral; in that context, the poet took Paraschiva Burdea as his concubine, then as his legal wife. The country declared for The Entente in late 1916, and was promptly invaded by the Central Powers—in what became known as "The Romanian Debacle". Before the siege of Bucharest in November 1916, Arghezi allowed Constanța to take their son and flee with him to Iași, which was still safely controlled by a rump Romanian state. Arghezi, who sided with the "Germanophile" camp, stayed behind in occupied Bucharest, and, as editor at Cronica and Gazeta Bucureștilor, propagandized against the legitimate government. Eliazar and his mother remained in Iași to 1918, when Romania sued for peace. They made their way back to Bucharest, when Constanța revealed to her former husband that she was gravely ill and materially destitute. He and Paraschiva agreed to sponsor her recovery; she moved back to her teaching post in Constanța City, while Paraschiva looked after Eliazar, who was enlisted as a student at Saint Sava National College.

Shortly before the November Armistice, Ententist forces took control of government and resumed war against the Central Powers. Identified as a collaborator with the enemy, Arghezi was arrested that December and interned in Văcărești Prison, where he lost contact with his family. Eliazar rebelled against Paraschiva and fled the family home in May and September 1919, visiting with his mother in Constanța. As a result, Arghezi asked for, and occasionally received, temporary reprieves to go fetch him back. In his letters to the authorities, Arghezi spoke of Eliazar's "irresponsibility" and wanderlust, whereas the boy himself complained that he was being flogged by an unnamed uncle. The poet was ultimately amnestied by King Ferdinand in December 1919, likely due to a change of government and overall political direction in Romania. He lived for a while with Eliazar at the Elisabeta apartment. Visitors included Romulus Dianu, Eliazar's schoolmate at Saint Sava (and himself a future writer of note). Dianu recalls that Arghezi was "affable" and genuinely interested in "what children think", but also that his relationship with Eliazar was permanently broken: "Eliazar had some sort of disease that the French call 'fugue', and which manifests as a sudden departure from one's home, under the pressure of a morbid impulse, as in hysteria or epilepsy."

Art critic Petru Comarnescu, who shared a school-desk with Eliazar, describes him as "sweet, classy, well-behaved", displaying "humor and discretion", and largely silent about his being constantly persecuted by Tudor and Paraschiva. During episodes of camaraderie between father and son, Eliazar received from Arghezi a motorcycle and also his first camera, which helped him discover his passion for photography. Arghezi once reported that he had personally handled the boy's practical education, teaching him to take photographs, to repair engines, and to shave others. He believed that such skills would ensure his financial survival in any environment. The young man was again on the run in 1921, stealing 10,000 lei from the family coffers, and set for emigrating to the United States. He managed to get on a boat sailing out of Romania, but felt a sense of guilt toward his mother, and voluntarily returned to her. She died later in 1921, from bronchopneumonia (possibly while undergoing surgery).

Eliazar was reported as missing in January 1922. The announcement gave his physical attributes (also describing him as "intelligent, well-bred, courteous and affable, very discreet and adept at complicating and veiling situations"), noting that he was being searched for by the Siguranța. He got as far away as Chișinău, but, penniless and demoralized by the cold, surrendered to the authorities. The young man became especially indignant in mid-1924, upon learning that Paraschiva was pregnant. He cemented his rebellion in December of that year, when he returned clandestinely to France. The more embellished accounts suggest that he did so by hopping a train and sticking to its undercarriage; he told friends that he in fact walked for a while, then moved between trains. He had on him two shirts, two overcoats, and 1,500 lei, taken from his father after falsely promising that he would use them to enlist in law school (in some biographies, he is mentioned as having actually undergone training in that field). Upon arriving in Paris (by way of Ljubljana and Trieste), he cut off links with the Theodorescus, becoming known exclusively as "Eli Lotar" (though still registered legally under the adapted form "Teodoresco"). As Dianu informs, this was the only way for him to "cure" his psychological condition.

Though he had himself been a teenage rebel, Arghezi was initially outraged, and declared himself shocked by Eliazar's erratic behavior. In a March 1925 letter to G. D. Mugur, he asked that his son be returned to him, and further implied that Eliazar was a pathological liar. During the following months, he reportedly "fell back on imprecations" whenever reminded of the incident, and warned people around him not to give Eliazar any material aid. For a while, the poet kept track of his son's movement through informants in the Ministry of Foreign Affairs, which was then led by his political friend, Ion G. Duca. Some of the information was lost, allegedly because the Romanian ambassador in Paris, Constantin Diamandi, resented Duca. When all efforts to locate and apprehend his son failed, Arghezi discreetly mourned the loss with passages in his various works—in 1930, he referred to "my eldest boy" as having once been his and Dianu's "comrade". When Duca went to Paris on state duty, he offered to help kidnap Eliazar and bring him back home; Arghezi was no longer interested, answering: "if he likes to eat his merde over there, why bother bringing him back at all?" From his marriage to Paraschiva, he had two other children: Domnica "Mitzura" and Iosif "Baruțu". The latter recalls that, throughout his childhood, he was provided with basic information on his half-brother, and had formed a mental image from a photograph that Arghezi Sr. always kept by his bed.

=== Debut ===
Lotar had initially bunked with a Romanian friend, Dinu Mereuță, trying to obtain employment as an actor. According to journalist Diana Meseșan, the correspondence he exchanged with Mereuță may indicate that the two were sexually attracted to each other. She cites in this respect Lotar's niece, Doina Teodorescu, who believed her uncle was bisexual, but notes that Lotar expert Damarice Amao was skeptical of the interpretation (since the letters may only show an intense friendship between the two). After being told to move out by Mereuță's parents, Eliazar braved poverty and social marginalization, doing odd jobs as a bricklayer, mechanic, and silent film extra (the latter, on the French Riviera). He thus appeared as one of the smugglers in Jacques Feyder's Carmen (1926), sharing screen time with Luis Buñuel, the future film director. Lotar ultimately bought himself a camera, and became highly successful as an art photographer, in or around 1927. Since 1926, he was the apprentice and erotic partner of a more distinguished photographer, Germaine Krull, who handled his introduction to the avant-garde scene, and whom he depicts in a number of critically acclaimed portraits. She found him to be a man of "extreme beauty", with "brown eyes and a kindness that almost hurt". They were joined for a while by a Romanian student, Nicolae Carandino, who strolled with them around Paris and helped with carrying their equipment in exchange for food. According to Carandino, they received visitors, including Buñuel (made famous by his work on Un Chien Andalou), in their sleeping quarters at Becquerel Hotel.

Lotar's first noted work was a series of seascapes, copying László Moholy-Nagy's, and with increasingly unconventional cityscapes. He experimented with techniques and approaches learned from Krull, in particular by repeatedly photographing Paris from his window (revealing its chaos) and from the street (where he could reveal and highlight its inner workings). He reconnected with French cinema in 1927, as the unit still photographer for Poker d'as and Apaches of Paris—lost films by, respectively, Henri Desfontaines and Nikolai Malikoff; he then did similar work for Jean Dréville, Alberto Cavalcanti, André Cerf, and José Leitão de Barros. Cavalcanti also used him for photographing on his Chaperon rouge of 1929, which is sometimes presented as Lotar's first film credit. He debuted as a cameraman the same year, for Cavalcanti's Vous verrez la semaine prochaine, and then did similar work with Joris Ivens on We are Building. Critic Șerban Cioculescu notes that Lotar had formally adhered to surrealism, and was illustrating its tenets with "modern methods in photography". His debt to surrealism was evident in his 1929–1930 work with Roger Vitrac and Antonin Artaud, using photomontage to honor the legacy of Alfred Jarry. He was additionally employed by Jean Painlevé on his maritime documentaries Crabes and Caprelles, "with results that astonished the surrealists."

In 1928, Lotar obtained French citizenship. The same year, Krull and her lover completed work on their Métal portfolio, and signed a photojournalism contract with Vu magazine. He followed Krull's lead in doing very detailed shots of hands, emphasizing activity and the effects of labor. One such piece, showing dirty fingers reading Braille, in L'Art Vivant of August 1929; it is seen by art historian Jordana Mendelson as emblematic, "disturbing", and more accomplished than conventional works by his imitator, Jean Roubier. Initially using Krull's Icarette camera, Lotar now bought himself an Ermanox, which allowed him to engage in candid photography, and also to develop his own techniques in street photography, partly evoking Eugène Atget's. The two lovers were featured alongside Moholy-Nagy and Man Ray at a 1929 art show in Brussels; Lotar was also featured at the Film und Foto of Stuttgart, Weimar Germany. Also in 1929, Lotar joined efforts with Jacques-André Boiffard, setting up a practice called Studios Unis, which lasted until 1931.

Image from the slaughterhouse series in Documents

Affiliated for a while with the post-surrealist cell at Documents, under Georges Bataille's direction, Lotar published shocking images of Parisian slaughterhouses. These were greatly enjoyed by Bataille, who used them to illustrate his dictionary of concepts (November 1929), as well as his own philosophical views on "the violence of human desire and the baseness of human thought." The photographs are described by scholar Yve-Alain Bois as "flat, without melodrama", and largely bloodless. According to Bois, they work toward suggesting a "civilized scotomization", or a ritualized circumventing of everyday horrors. Researcher Ion Pop sees them as "startling in their feeling of abandon into solitude, in their cruelly realistic depiction of death". According to Bataille scholar Benjamin Noys:

Eli Lotar has put us back into contact with this work of death through images of animal carcasses, butchers and smears of blood. What these images also reveal is that this violent slaughter, on which many of us non-vegetarians still depend, has become a mechanical and technical activity. In one of the photographs a line of severed animal legs rests against a wall in an ordered arrangement that represses the violence of the slaughter. We are doubly alienated from the slaughterhouse: firstly, we do not wish to see what happens there and secondly, its activities turn death into a productive and neutral event.

The slaughterhouse series proved influential outside Bataille's circle. Some such pieces were used in the May 1931 issue of Vu, alongside texts by Carlo Rim, as well as being sampled in Bifur and Variétés. They also inspired the more junior photographer Henri Cartier-Bresson, who was going through his surrealist phase. Overall, Lotar did not fully embrace Documents' ideology, and only preserved links with some members of the group, privileging contacts with ethnographer Georges Henri Rivière of The Trocadéro. Even as his political opinions swung to the left, he preserved a degree of sympathy for French colonialism, which Rivière also favored and embodied in his work. This approach ran contrary to other portions of the Documents political agenda—at the time, Bataille was still referencing the slaughterhouse pictures, using them as a simile for France's colonial exploitation of New Caledonia. Additionally, Lotar's aesthetics now departed from Krull's "technicist modernism", evolving into what Amao described as "poetic naturalism". His focus on photojournalism was also preserved, with contributions in Vu, L'Art Vivant, and several other journals; for a while c. 1930, his main interest was in capturing images of nightlife, with special focus on showgirls and actresses, as well as with a reportage on Féral Benga. He no longer believed in studio work, and affixed his gaze on "speed, movement, the life of the people."

Lotar's own place in art history was ensured by 1930, when his photographic prints were said to be worth as much as Pablo Picasso's paintings. Also then, he was involved with the unrealized film project Fils de famille, which was probably based on a screenplay of that same name, penned in 1928 by Jacques Prévert. He made his debut as a cinematographer for Ivens, who had since married Krull. Together, Ivens and Lotar completed a documentary on life along the Zuiderzee, and later the project called New Earth. Lotar finally took his distance from Bataille while on the Zuiderzee: with an article and a set of photos published in Jazz magazine, he announced that his primary interest was in documenting labor conditions.

=== Communist turn ===
Upon the start of 1931, Lotar was in the Portuguese Republic, filming with Leitão de Barros and Jacques Brunius on a pioneering sound film, A Severa. Also then, his photographs were used as illustrations by lexicographer Émile Jules Antoine Chautard, in his Dictionnaire de l'argot. Before the end of the year, Lotar was a cinematographer on Vitrac and Brunius' travelogue in the Kingdom of Greece and the Cyclades in particular, also completing a set of on-location photographs that were showcased by the Minotaure group. The film's mix of observational and surrealist detail won praise in a Romanian avant-garde magazine, unu, which announced it as part of a series on "Greece modern and ancient." In 1932, he began a long-term amorous relationship with a Russian expatriate painter, Elisabeth Makovska, whom he also introduced to photography.

Lotar's art soon became politically subversive, with commissions received directly from the French Communist Party (PCF) and its Association des Écrivains et Artistes Révolutionnaires (AÉAR); in mid-1933, he was elected secretary of the AÉAR's photographic section. He was embraced by the agitprop actors at Octobre, helping to document their 1933 show, Fantômes. The Romanian photographer had a steady collaboration with Yves Allégret, inaugurated when he did camera work for Allégret's Prix et Profits, a "pedagogical" short film that integrated Marxist messaging. Allégret wanted to take him on a filming trip to Las Hurdes, in Republican Spain—they both were fascinated by the area's legendary remoteness and primitivism. Their project, accredited by Pathé, began in March 1932. The travelers were intimidated by the hostile Spanish authorities, and openly threatened with violence by devout worshipers whom they wanted to photograph in Seville; they were then jailed, and allegedly beaten, by undercover policemen at Carmona, who wanted them punished as agents of communism. Allégret and Lotar had in fact crossed through Andalusia precisely as the mainstream Republicans were engaged in a latent conflict with the Communist Party of Spain and the Confederación Nacional del Trabajo, with sedition directly encouraged by figures such as Ramón Casanellas.

The affair still caused an international scandal, and the filmmakers were ultimately released following protests by André Gide and Édouard Herriot. They were expelled by train to Cádiz, and made to embark on the first ship leaving port. Learning that they would be heading for South America, they skipped ship and took a mail boat that was bound for Tenerife, which they reached in April 1932. They decided to openly deride the Spanish authorities by resuming their filming here, deciding that the Canary Islands were in several ways similar to Las Hurdes, and applying the "elements of Marxist analysis" to the overall situation they encountered. They also misled the island council into granting them authorization, and then managed to obtain funds from the Cepsa petroleum company, promising them free advertising. Their work was witnessed with bewilderment by a local journalist, Prometeo Stentor, who described Allégret as having "the concentrated attention of a businessman", while Lotar was "thick, rosy, strong and quiet, with the naive expression of an overgrown child".

Lotar was credited as cameraman on the resulting documentary, which was only released by Pathé in 1936, when Jacques Prévert agreed to provide narration. Lotar left Tenerife with mixed feelings, declaring himself underwhelmed by the experience; he sailed to Barcelona and then to Marseille, where he began working with Marc Allégret on the commercially successful Fanny. It endures as the only production crediting him as assistant director. He then returned to Paris, living for a while at No. 39 Rue Dauphine, where his neighbors included Prévert, comedian Lou Bonin, and actress Ghislaine May. Lotar finally reached Las Hurdes upon filming on Land Without Bread—the ethnofictional project by Buñuel. According to Lotar, funding was achieved through a lottery win and a bet between Buñuel and Ramón Acín, with the film done at an "incredibly fast pace" in April–May 1933. The crew was based in Las Batuecas, driving out to their destination for more than two hours daily; Lotar worked with a camera that he had borrowed from Allégret. Though this project made use of his ideas, he had been reluctant to join in, noting that he hardly knew the other men whom Buñuel had hired—including screenwriter Pierre Unik. The resulting film is seen by critics as an unusual example of political cooperation between communists, on one hand, Lotar and Unik, and, on the other, anarchists such as Acín.

The film was initially banned by Spain's Lerroux cabinet. The authorities were under pressure from their hard-right partners in the CEDA, but liberals such as Gregorio Marañón also found it contained "ugly things" that should not be advertised. Ultimately released later in the 1930s, Land Without Bread was described by film critic Georges Sadoul as a "classic social documentary", which deserved its presence in film archives around the world; it remains controversial due to its depiction of rural destitution, which it emphasized with staged photography. Upon arriving in La Alberca, Lotar had indulged his own ethnographic interest with a series of portraits showing "Albercanos in their best clothes, the women always in black and the men with their decorated vests with embroidery and silver buttons." He was even more impressed by the rugged terrain and "harsh" people of Aceitunilla and Martilandrán, taking photographs that were immediately after published in the magazine Octubre, which had links with the AÉAR. As a sign of their growing friendship, Buñuel initiated Lotar and Unik into his "Order of Toledo"—Lotar as a "squire", and Unik as a more advanced "knight".

=== Late 1930s and Vichy period ===
Alongside the similarly communized Boiffard, Lotar intended to circumnavigate the planet aboard the sailing vessel "Exir Dallen", but finally only managed to visit impoverished communities in places such as Andalusia and French Morocco. Their captain and sponsor was Fernando de Cárdenas, a Spaniard with left-wing convictions—the trip itself was described by French and Spanish conservatives as propagating Marxism, with funds provided by the PCF and the Comintern. Boiffard and Lotar did not manage to complete the film that had been commissioned by Cárdenas, though their photographs were exhibited with a twin show at Galerie de la Pléiade during early 1934. It received immediate praise from critic Claude Santeul:

We are dealing with two photographers who know their craft and understand the psychology of "photography." Caught unawares, all of these figures, a beggar in rags, porters carrying heavy loads, a sordid old man, a merchant at work, a mother breastfeeding her infant, were carefully studied and closely watched. None of these chanced-upon models had time before the shutter's release to strike a "pose"... that silly, bored, or evasive forced attitude assumed by someone who finds themselves watched by the lens of a camera.

During a 1935 encounter with Pericle Martinescu, Arghezi expressed some pride in Eliazar's accomplishments, but noted that he and his son were not exchanging letters, since "in any case, letters move slow these days." In another period conversation, he reflected on the "pretty important stuff" that Lotar has achieved, immediately adding: "Had he stayed in the country, it is quite likely that he would have achieved more." Their political stances were also diverging. Identified in some contexts as a "right-wing figure, of a typically extremist hue", Arghezi supported authoritarian rule by Carol II, and also, to a lesser degree, the fascist Iron Guard.

By then, Lotar had filmed several commercials by Jean Aurenche, as well as Pierre Prévert's comedy, L'affaire est dans le sac, and Lou Tchimoukow's Pêche à la baleine. He was full director on La Canción del afilador ("Song of the Knife-grinder"), which was released in 1934 but was subsequently lost. P. Prévert and Jacques Becker used Lotar's services as a set photographer on their 1934 film, Le Commissaire est bon enfant, le gendarme est sans pitié; he then did similar work for Jean Renoir and his Partie de campagne. Lotar returned with Vitrac and Makovska for a second filming expedition to Greece (1935). The resulting images, including shots of the Acropolis, were featured in Heracles Ioannides' tourist magazine, Le Voyage en Grèce (spring 1936), as illustrations for an article by Jean Cassou. He curated the AÉAR's 1935 show, and had his own photographic series printed at Éditions Arthaud. Lotar was in Spain for the ongoing civil war. He played a part in documenting the Siege of Madrid—with photographs carried in Minotaure. Upon his return, he helped film Léo Joannon's Vous n'avez rien à déclarer?, Brunius' Records 37, as well as two documentaries by Henri Storck (Les Maisons de la misère, Comme une lettre à la poste). In July 1938, while driving outside Chaffois, he blocked a railway connection, and was fined by the tribunal correctionnel. He spent most of that year traveling around French Indochina and, on his return, married Makovska.

Just before World War II, Lotar was working with Brunius on another documentary, called Violons d'Ingres. His photographic work was being collected for print by Tériade, who wanted it featured in a collective album (alongside works by Cartier-Bresson, Bill Brandt, and Brassaï), but the precipitating events put an end to his ambitions. Arghezi once claimed that the prelude of war caught his son in The Netherlands, filming a medical documentary on oysters. He tried to drive across Nazi Germany and back to Bucharest, but was stopped in Nazified Austria, and "took a turn back to France". He was drafted by the French Army during the defense of the national territory, and, following the June 1940 armistice, traveled on foot into Vichy France's Zone libre, where his wife awaited him. He opened a studio in Cannes during 1941, and became involved with the local branch of the French Resistance. He returned to set photography for Y. Allégret's Les Deux Timides, which was filmed at Nice, then filmed on L'Âme de l'Auvergne, by Fred Orain and Lucien Vittet.

=== Aubervilliers and Romanian return ===
In Bucharest, Arghezi aligned himself with the fascist regime fronted by Ion Antonescu, but engaged in open criticism of its alliance with Germany, and earned public respect upon being interned at Târgu Jiu. The incriminated work had been published with the tacit approval of anti-Nazis in the government apparatus, including his son's childhood friend, Dianu. By 1944, Lotar had escaped to Switzerland, renting a room at the Hôtel de Rive in Geneva. He shared this lodging with the local sculptor Alberto Giacometti, whom he photographed for Skira publishers. Making his way back to France upon the Liberation of Paris, Lotar was cameraman on two new film projects—René Bertrand's Six et petites and Gilles Margaritis' L'Homme (both in 1945). The latter film was shown in theaters alongside the relaunched Partie de campagne. According to critic Pierre Velghe, the mix was a doubtful choice: the Margaritis piece was "embarrassing" and "scatological", whereas Renoir's displayed Lotar's talents as a "master of light".

Lotar's next work was, by his own account, heavily indebted to Italian neorealism. He achieved his own fame as an auteur with the short film Aubervilliers, one of several films depicting "extreme poverty" in the eponymous commune. Though a propaganda effort by mayor Charles Tillon of the PCF, it had genuine success that rested on Lotar's "almost surrealistic" filming, but also on the text (provided by J. Prévert) and the music (by Joseph Kosma). Sparking "lively polemics" among film professionals, it was detested by cinema operators and various columnists, including Jean-Jacques Gautier, from its first screening in February 1946. Seeing it as a "miserabilist" work, they attempted to scrap it, but were prevented from doing so by higher-ups of the Provisional Government. François Chalais described it as "the best film of today" and a "masterpiece" in its own category, combining the "facile opium" of melodrama and the filmmaker's "uncanny intelligence", generating fragments of beauty that were both unexpected and ineffable. Aubervilliers was selected for the 1946 Cannes Film Festival, and received an award at the avant-garde festival of Knokke-Heist (1949).

Lotar also began work on the documentary Grand'routes, but allowed it to be finished by another filmmaker, Raymond Lamy. By August 1946, he was collaborating with Charles Spaak on what was supposed to be his "first great film". The project was based on a novel by Suzanne Chantal, and required him to film in Belgium and Salazarist Portugal; he was for a while in Lisbon, where he employed a local crew and recorded scenes from real-life. Later that year, he traveled in the Eastern bloc, directing since-lost documentaries in Yugoslavia and Czechoslovakia. In September 1947, he was in Poland, directing a piece on the life of miners repatriated from France; this film was also lost. During his time there, he tried but failed to locate the remains of his former colleague Unik, who had died in Silesia while trying to escape the Nazis.

At home, the Romanian Communist Party was attacking Lotar's father as an opportunistic and unreliable figure. As early as February 1945, communist writer Miron Radu Paraschivescu accused Arghezi of fascism and anti-Sovietism. According to Paraschivescu, Eliazar, who had embraced "revolutionary" ideas upon leaving his country, was "T. Arghezi's first son—his first, and not just chronologically." As noted by scholar Ruxandra Cesereanu, Paraschivescu aimed at symbolically "castrating" his aging adversary, creating a chasm between him and Lotar, while also depicting Baruțu as a nonentity. During the following period, the Arghezis were marginalized by the emergence of a Romanian communist regime. The attack was resumed in January 1948 by Sorin Toma, who inaugurated a full-on repression of Arghezi as a poet and public figure using a terminology that was largely lifted from Arghezi's own satirical pieces. Baruțu was for a while a political prisoner of the regime, being ultimately set free with a personal approval from a local communist boss, Ana Pauker. Soon after, Lotar found himself shunned by Buñuel and other leftists, after he had agreed to do photographic work for the Marshall Plan, under contract with the US government. Buñuel equated this activity with "being part of the Gestapo".

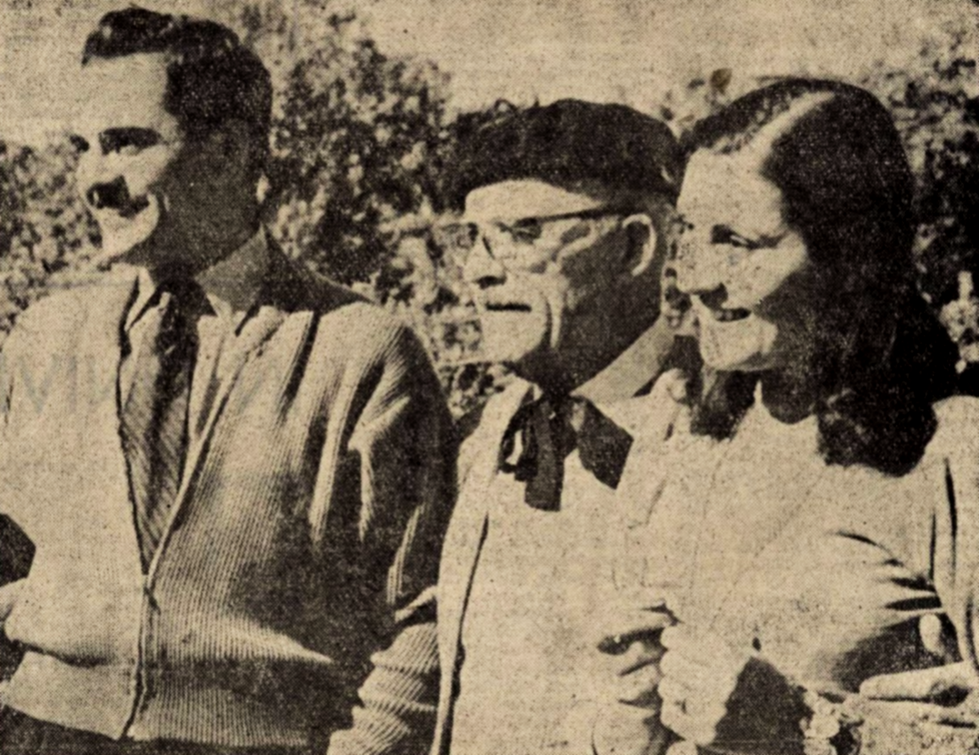
Tudor Arghezi with Lotar's half-siblings, Baruțu and Mitzura, photographed in May 1960

Lotar's final film, Bois d'Afrique ("African Forests"), was shot in French Cameroon, to music by Marcel Mihalovici and narration by Georges Ribemont-Dessaignes. It came out in 1952, at a time when he was already largely forgotten, having decided to seclude himself from the international circuit. His fading out of the spotlight ran parallel to his father's rehabilitation: Arghezi was converted to the status of a nominal communist during 1953, adopting a "servile conduct" in his relations with the Romanian regime. The son made his first return to Romania in 1956, after 32 years of self-imposed exile, following an invitation extended by George Macovescu of the National Film Office. He brought with him a print of Aubervilliers, which was projected at the Writers' Union. He was in contact with his father, who was at the time running for representative office, and who wanted him to work in Romanian cinema. For a while, Lotar considered working on film adaptations from Mihail Sadoveanu and George Mihail Zamfirescu, and was a consultant for Victor Iliu's Mill of Good Luck. In 1957, father and son visited the Palace of the Patriarchate, being greeted there by Arghezi's friend Bartolomeu Anania. Arghezi introduced Lotar to the Patriarch of All Romania, Justinian Marina, muttering that he was a "sin of my youth". Lotar also met the young actress and writer Aurora Cornu, with whom he corresponded; she intended to have the letters printed as a book, but Lotar lost them "in one of the houses he lived in, as he did not have a home of his own."

=== Decline and death ===
Arghezi and Lotar were again in conflict with each other when the celebrated writer flatly refused to finance one of his son's film projects. In conversations with other writers, Arghezi offered musings about the uselessness of child prodigies, contrasted by other comments—on the intrinsic value of documentary films. These statements were read by Mihu Dragomir as tacit evocations of Lotar. In 1958, Baruțu's newborn son was left severely disabled by medical error; the family traveled to Paris for specialized care, allowing Eliazar to meet his brother and nephew. The two men became very close during Baruțu's two-month stay, but never sought each other's company in later years. Around 1960, Eliazar played host to Eugen Jebeleanu and his wife, the illustrator Florica Cordescu, whom he introduced to Jacques Prévert. He himself returned to Romania in 1965; he made a point of traveling to Bălăceanca, where his Hungarian grandmother had died, shunned by the other Arghezis, in 1944. While Jebeleanu recounts that the grave could no longer be identified, Ferenczes reports that Lotar located the plot and paid his respects, but also that he was heartbroken by the details he learned. He happened to meet Cioculescu, who tried to engage him in conversation about his father. Lotar remained virtually mute on this topic, ending all conversation about the man he now called "the poet Arghezi". Lotar was however happy to meet his sister Mitzura, complimenting her on being "a darling". She was for a while the only person who still handled communications between him and Arghezi Sr.

Lotar's alcoholism "increasingly hampered his creative output [and] he seemingly abandoned all creative activity abruptly." In 1965, he was told by doctors that, at that rate of drinking, he would only live for two more years. Around then, he was again friends with Giacometti, whose works he was photographing for Skira. Artist Bernard Fraisse suggests that the "excellent photographer" and homeless alcoholic was also intentionally hired by Giacometti as a professional model—the Swiss artist was interested in studying his friend's physical decay and looming demise. This story was backed by another artist and first-hand witness, Giorgio Soavi: "Eli was the ideal model for this sculpture, since he was dead." Other accounts are that Giacometti was "sculpting Eli in God's likeness", or "projected his own anxieties about life and death". Lotar posed for his friend on three different occasions (the resulting sculptures are labeled Lotar I–III).

Giacometti also paid for Lotar's extravagant parties, which were also attended by two Romanian defectors—his friend Cornu, and Șerban Sideriu. Cornu, who also faced homelessness, was not impressed by these gatherings, noting that Lotar was spending all his money on shots of whiskey; she recalls that, at age 60, he seemed to be twenty or thirty years older, his face resembling "a statue in decadent Rome, [or] some bird" (elsewhere, "a sublime bird"). She counted on his financial aid, which he seemed unable to provide: "None of the men I relied on could ever help me." She reports however that he and his friends in the Latin Quarter were useful in guarding her from Giacometti, who always hoped that he could seduce her.

Having separated himself from his wife, Lotar was experiencing near-complete financial ruin, worsened by his studied indifference—friends report that he was living as a "boyar", a "charming slob", and a serial seducer. Cornu suggests that the latter was undeserved: "Everybody loved him, the women were all jealous... Whereas he, the poor fella, needed no woman, not since the thirties; I can't tell you why that was, I myself am clueless." He unexpectedly outlived Giacometti, who never managed to finish the third bust, which topped Giacometti's own grave. Lotar preserved thousands of negatives from the latter part of the sculptor's career. According to Cioculescu, he was keen on maintaining his own artistic integrity, and neither printed nor sold these; Fraisse contrarily reports that he tried his best to exchange them for money. The 87-year-old Arghezi died in Bucharest on 14 July 1967, after a short battle with pneumonia. The photographer made a final return trip to Romania in the 1967–1968 winter, visiting with Comarnescu—who was saddened to note that his friend had lost all his charms, and now resembled a "worried bourgeois." Jebeleanu honored him with a prose poem, carried by Contemporanul in January 1968. It depicted Lotar as "too little of this world", an emaciated vagabond almost ready to "leave, stark-naked, on that road that leads up to the stars."

Lotar was hoping to collect some of his father's inheritance, but only managed to obtain 30,000 lei in cash; he expected to share royalties with the other Arghezi descendants, but the procedures dragged on. He himself died upon his return to Paris, on 10 May 1969. According to Cornu, he was in the Latin Quarter, visiting with a couple of American photographers, and had just finished his dinner. He was hastily buried in a pauper's grave at the city's expense. The plot was located by his many fans, who covered it in flowers. Throughout his lifetime, he had participated in ten group exhibits and had contributed on 36 short films; his other work comprised some 9,000 individual photographs, which he had painstakingly catalogued for posterity. They include some 1,300 stills from his Spanish trips, but exclude whole series that are presumed lost—including most of the slaughterhouse portfolio and all of his studies of Giacometti.

== Legacy ==
On 31 May 1969, Lotar's half-siblings organized a wake at their father's estate, Mărțișor. An affectionate overview of his work was penned by Ivens, and appeared in a May 1969 issue of Les Nouvelles littéraires; it was quoted by Cioculescu in a similar piece for România Literară, which also called on Romanian publishers to contribute an album of Lotar's lifelong contributions. In another piece for Contemporanul, Jebeleanu expressed solidarity with Ivens' "cry of indignation" against the artistic establishment, which had ignored their friend; he added to this the punning motto, Eli, Eli, lama sabachthani?. Lotar's work as a photographer was collected by the Centre Pompidou (Musée National d'Art Moderne), "not as prints but as unremarkable boxes of negatives". Such samples were developed and first showcased by that institution in November 1993, with a special retrospective—94 images were on show, alongside two of the Giacometti sculptures. His half-sister was involved with the project, helping to locate and exhibit "photographs of his youth in Bucharest", while other documents were donated by Makovska's daughter from another relationship. Diana Meseșan comments that his art remained "virtually unknown" in his native country for yet another decade, with most attention focusing on him as "Arghezi's illegitimate son". The collection, alongside various letters and documents, was exhibited in Bucharest, for the first time, in April 2019—marking a collaboration between Centre Pompidou and the Museum of Romanian Literature. The Arghezis continued to maintain some discretion regarding their relative: in his 1994 memoir, Baruțu presents Eli Lotar as born into his father's first marriage (rather than as an illegitimate child).

Lotar's contribution to Aubervilliers' history is recognized by that town, which named a park after him. The Giacometti sculptures are praised by Fraisse as samples of his great artistic refinement, finally achieving the artist's desire to match the purified standards of ancient Egyptian art. He regards Lotar's portraits as a modern-day answer to The Seated Scribe. Illustrator and essayist Marina Debattista observes that the final work of the series was especially masterful, since it captured the solitude and "void" gaze of the dying artist. One of them was exhibited at the Musée de l'Orangerie in February 1970, prompting Romanian journalist Th. Stana to comment: "With his kind smile, Ely doesn't scold any of us who have forgotten him during his final living years". Lotar is a character in Salvador Simó's 2019 cartoon Buñuel in the Labyrinth of the Turtles, which retells the filming of Land Without Bread, and is loosely based on a graphic novel by Fermín Solís. The film takes significant liberties from fact, for instance by showing conversations between Lotar and Buñuel from a time when the latter was still in America. The fictionalized Lotar is alluded to as the person who inspired the project, but could not carry it through on his own; his philosophy is also depicted as being centered on "giving a voice to the people of Las Hurdes."
