= Buñuel in the Labyrinth of the Turtles =

Spanish animated film

- Film poster
- Spanish: Buñuel en el laberinto de las tortugas
- Directed by: Salvador Simó
- Screenplay by: Eligio R. Montero; Salvador Simó
- Based on: Buñuel en el laberinto de las tortugas Fermín Solís; Land Without Bread by Luis Buñuel
- Produced by: Manuel Cristobal; José M. Fernández de Vega
- Starring: Jorge Usón; Fernando Ramos; Luis Enrique de Tomás; Cyril Corral; Javier Balas
- Edited by: José Manuel Jiménez
- Music by: Arturo Cardelús
- Production companies: Sygnatia; The Glow; Submarine
- Distributed by: GKIDS (United States)
- Release dates: October 20, 2018 (Animation Is Film Festival); April 26, 2019 (Spain)
- Running time: 77 minutes
- Country: Spain
- Languages: Spanish; French
- Box office: $178,311

Buñuel in the Labyrinth of the Turtles (Spanish: Buñuel en el laberinto de las tortugas) is a 2018 Spanish adult animated biographical drama film directed by Salvador Simó and written by Simó & Eligio R. Montero based on the graphic novel Buñuel en el laberinto de las tortugas by Fermín Solís, about film director Luis Buñuel making the 1933 film Land Without Bread. In August 2019, it was shortlisted as one of the three films in contention to be the Spanish entry for the Academy Award for Best International Feature Film at the 92nd Academy Awards, but lost to Pain and Glory.

== Plot ==
The controversy surrounding his first feature length film, L'Age d'Or, leaves director Luis Buñuel unable to find new work. An anthropologist named Maurice Legendre hands Buñuel an ethnographic study of the Las Hurdes region of Spain and asks if he would consider making a documentary of the region. Buñuel's friend, sculptor Ramón Acín, buys a lottery ticket and promises to use the winnings to fund the film. Indeed, Ramón wins and keeps his promise. So Buñuel assembles a film crew in the town of La Alberca.

From La Alberca, Buñuel drives the crew to a monastery that doubles as a hostel. From the monastery, the crew explores the nearby villages. The villages consist of ramshackle box-shaped houses packed tightly. The winding streets between the houses make each village resemble a labyrinth, and Ramón notes that the jagged roofs resemble the scales on a turtle. The crew find themselves appalled by the poverty-stricken conditions of the homes. The plentifulness of their food supplies astonishes villagers. When they film a school, they find out that locals make most of their money getting government payments for taking in orphaned children, and the schoolchildren crowd around Buñuel desperate for affection. Buñuel later finds a little girl dying on the street, and feels helpless not having the medicine that would cure her.

Although the film is a documentary, Buñuel stages many scenes for dramatic effect, in opposition to his crew. In La Alberca, Buñuel makes Ramón hire a farmer to reenact the local tradition of ripping the head off of a rooster. Later on, Buñuel wants to film the image of a mountain goat slipping and falling down a cliffside, but shoots a goat dead rather than wait for an accident to happen. Buñuel also arranges for a donkey to get stung to death by bees, to use as a symbol for the suffering of the local people.

All through the shoot, Buñuel is tormented by nightmares of his troubled childhood. One nightmare about his mother and the Virgin Mary compels him to dress in a nun's habit. When the sick girl finally dies, Buñuel has a nightmare where he sees a friend from the region as Death. The nightmare inspires him to have the villagers reenact a funeral for an infant for the film.

By 1933, Buñuel is back in Paris editing his film, Las Hurdes: Tierra Sin Pan. Notes at the end of this movie explain that days after the Nationalist coup in Spain, Ramón Acín and then his wife were executed for their Anarchist activity. Buñuel is able to release his movie in Spain, but without Ramón's name. Movie notes explain that he was able to restore Ramon's name to the credits many years later.

== Cast ==
Character	Original Actor	Dub Actor
Luis Buñuel	Jorge Usón	Rupert Degas
Luis Buñuel	Javier Balas (young)	Micah McHugh-Dominguez(young)
Ramón Acín	Fernando Ramos	John Hollingworth
Pierre Unik	Luis Enrique de Tomás	Jean-Baptiste Fillon
Eli Lotar	Cyril Corral	Phillipe Smolikowski
Luis' Father	Gabriel Latorre	John Hollingworth
Luis' Mother	Pepa Garcia	Anna Francolini
Mayor Hurdan	Juan Carlos Tirado	Vidal Sancho
Conchita Monrás	Maria Pérez	Jules de Jongh

== Production ==
The film is a traditional animation adaptation of the graphic novel Buñuel en el laberinto de las tortugas, illustrated by Fermín Solís. The work was published in 2008 by Astiberri, originally in black and white, and was reissued in 2019 by Reservoir Books using the same color palette as the film. It was nominated for the Premio Nacional del Cómic, although the award ultimately went to Arrugas by Paco Roca.

The adaptation was made by animator Salvador Simó, who had previously worked in the United States. In his directorial debut, he also handled the screenplay, co-written with Eligio R. Montero. Although the film makes several changes from the original work, it retains two scenes at the request of Solís: the appearance of the Virgin Mary with Buñuel's mother's face, and the parts where the director disguises himself as a nun. Regarding the influence of Las Hurdes on Buñuel's filmography and his life, Simó has explained that "Buñuel intended to change Las Hurdes, but it was Las Hurdes that changed him."

The process involved a team of over 200 professionals, including cartoonist José Luis Ágreda as the art director. The production was handled by Sygnatia Films, Glow Animation, Hampa Animation, and the Dutch studio Submarine.

== Release ==
The world premiere was held at the 2018 Animation Is Film Festival in Los Angeles on October 20, 2018. It was released in cinemas in Spain on April 26, 2019.

== Reception ==
=== Critical response ===
Buñuel in the Labyrinth of the Turtles has an approval rating of 98% on review aggregator website Rotten Tomatoes, based on 51 reviews, and an average rating of 7.1/10. The website's critical consensus states, "Thrillingly imaginative and appropriately surreal, Buñuel and the Labyrinth of the Turtles open an alluringly dreamlike window into the life of a brilliant artist. Metacritic assigned the film a weighted average score of 74 out of 100, based on 12 critics, indicating "generally favorable reviews".

=== Awards and nominations ===
==== Accolades ====
Award	Category	Recipient(s)	Result	Ref.
Annie Awards	Best Animated Feature — Independent	Hampa Animation Studio	Nominated	
Medallas del Círculo de Escritores Cinematográficos	Best Animated Film	Salvador Simó	Won	
Medallas del Círculo de Escritores Cinematográficos	Best New Director	Salvador Simó	Won	
Medallas del Círculo de Escritores Cinematográficos	Best Adapted Screenplay	Eligio R. Montero and Salvador Simó	Won	
Medallas del Círculo de Escritores Cinematográficos	Best Original Score	Arturo Cardelús	Nominated	
European Film Awards	Best Animated Feature Film	Salvador Simó	Won	
Feroz Awards	Best Original Soundtrack	Arturo Cardelús	Nominated	
Goya Awards	Best Animated Film	Buñuel in the Labyrinth of the Turtles	Won	
Goya Awards	Best New Director	Salvador Simó	Nominated	
Goya Awards	Best Adapted Screenplay	Eligio Montero and Salvador Simó	Nominated	
Goya Awards	Best Original Score	Arturo Cardelús	Nominated	
Platino Awards	Best Animated Film	Buñuel in the Labyrinth of the Turtles	Won	
Quirino Awards	Best Ibero-American Feature Film	Buñuel in the Labyrinth of the Turtles	Nominated	
Satellite Awards	Best Animated or Mixed Media Feature	Buñuel in the Labyrinth of the Turtles	Nominated	
