= Land Without Bread =

1933 short film by Luis Buñuel

Las Hurdes
- Film poster
- French: Las Hurdes: Tierra Sin Pan
- Directed by: Luis Buñuel
- Written by: Luis Buñuel; Rafael Sánchez Ventura; Pierre Unik
- Produced by: Ramón Acín; Luis Buñuel
- Starring: Abel Jacquin; Alexandre O'Neill
- Cinematography: Eli Lotar
- Edited by: Luis Buñuel
- Music by: Johannes Brahms
- Release date: December 1933 (Spain)
- Running time: 27 minutes
- Country: Spain
- Languages: French; Spanish

Las Hurdes: Tierra Sin Pan (English: Land Without Bread or Unpromised Land) is a 1933 French-language Spanish pseudo-documentary (ethnofiction) short film directed by Luis Buñuel and co-produced by Buñuel and Ramón Acin. The narration was written by Buñuel, Rafael Sánchez Ventura, and Pierre Unik, with cinematography by Eli Lotar.

== Plot ==
The film focuses on the Las Hurdes region of Spain, the mountainous area around the town of La Alberca, and the intense poverty of its occupants, who were so backwards and isolated that bread was unknown. A main source of income for them was taking in orphan children, for whom they received a government subsidy. Buñuel, who made the film after reading the ethnographic study Las Jurdes: étude de géographie humaine (1927) by Maurice Legendre, took a Surrealist approach to the notion of the anthropological expedition. The result was a travelogue in which the narrator’s extreme (indeed, exaggerated) descriptions of human misery of Las Hurdes contrasts with its inhabitants' flat and uninterested manner.

== Cast ==
- Abel Jacquin (voice)
- Alexandre O'Neill (voice, dubbed version)

== Production ==
Buñuel claimed: "I was able to film Las Hurdes thanks to Ramón Acín, an anarchist from Huesca,...who one day at a cafe in Zaragoza told me, 'Luis, if I ever won the lottery, I would put up the money for you to make a film.' He won a hundred thousand pesetas...and gave me twenty thousand to make the film. With four thousand I bought a Fiat; Pierre Unik came, under contract from Vogue to write an article; and Eli Lotar arrived with a camera loaned by Marc Allégret."

The movie is a pseudo-documentary, parodying the exaggerated documentaries of travelers across the Sahara being filmed at the same time. One of Buñuel's points is that there are plenty of terrible subjects for a documentary right in Spain.

The film was originally silent, though Buñuel himself narrated when it was first shown. A French narration by actor Abel Jacquin was added in Paris in 1935. Buñuel used extracts of Johannes Brahms' Symphony No. 4 for the music.

Buñuel slaughtered at least two animals to make Las Hurdes. One Hurdano claimed that he arranged for an ailing donkey to be covered with honey so he could film it being stung to death by bees. Similarly, his crew shot a mountain goat that subsequently fell from a cliff for another sequence.

== Premiere and censorship ==
The premiere took place in December 1932 at Madrid's Palacio de la Prensa. The entire intellectual cream of the Spanish capital was invited to a semi-private show. The screening of the film in its first, still silent version was accompanied by music played from the turntable and the narrator's commentary personally read by Buñuel himself. During the premiere show there was a schism between the director and Gregorio Marañón, a former assistant to King Alfonso XIII of Spain during his trip to the Las Hurdes region in 1922 and the former director of the Royal Patronage (Spanish Patronato Real), an organization formed shortly after the trip to improving the situation of the inhabitants of the region.

Land Without Bread provoked such an uproar in Spain that conservative forces banned the distribution of the image throughout the country. The official reason for the censorship record was "defamation of the good name of the Spanish people." It was banned from 1933 to 1936.

== Reception ==
Writing for Night and Day in 1937, Graham Greene gave the film a neutral review, describing it as "[a]n honest and hideous picture, [...] free from propaganda". Greene claimed that it had a powerful effect and that it was "enough to shake anyone's complacency or self-pity".

In modern times, critical reception for Land Without Bread has been mostly positive. In 2002 Slant Magazine awarded the film 4 out of 4 stars, writing, "Las Hurdes becomes a frightening call to arms, a fabulous open text that resists simple readings and questions humanity's notion of progress." Jeffrey Ruoff called it a "revolutionary film."

Buñuel in the Labyrinth of the Turtles is a 2018 Spanish-Dutch animated film based on the graphic novel Buñuel en el laberinto de las tortugas by Fermín Solís. It covers how Buñuel and his crew filmed at Las Hurdes.
