= Surrealist Manifesto =

Published declaration of principles and intentions for surrealism

The Surrealist Manifesto refers to several publications by Yvan Goll and André Breton, leaders of rival surrealist groups. Goll and Breton both published manifestos in October 1924 titled Manifeste du surréalisme. Breton wrote a second manifesto in 1929, which was published the following year, and in 1942, a reflection or a commentary on the potential for a third manifesto, exploring how the Surrealist movement might adapt to changing times.

== History ==
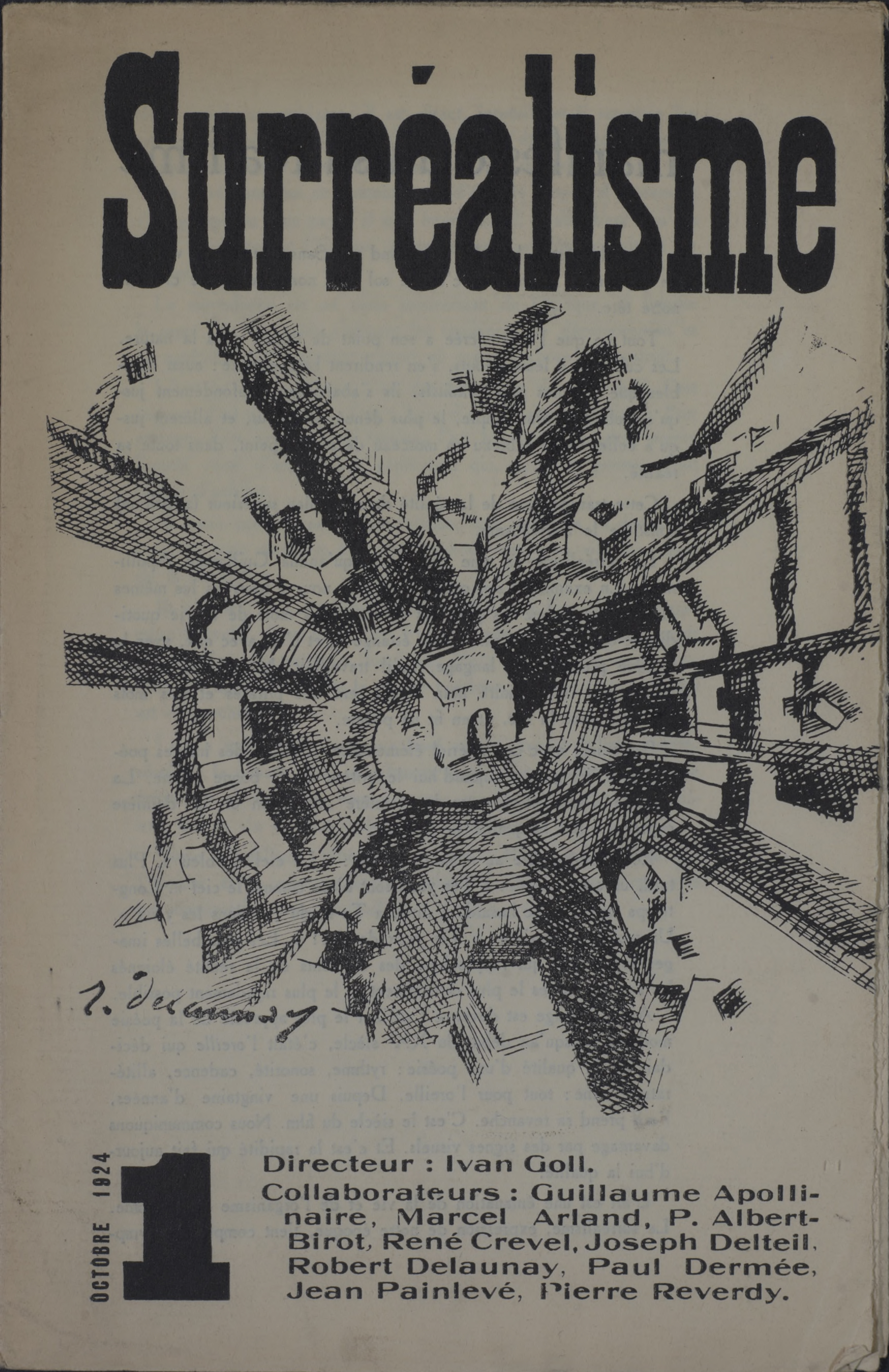
Yvan Goll, Surréalisme, Manifeste du surréalisme, Volume 1, Number 1, October 1, 1924, cover by Robert Delaunay

By 1924, two rival surrealist groups had formed, each claiming to be a successor of the legacy of Guillaume Apollinaire. One group, led by Yvan Goll, included Pierre Albert-Birot, Paul Dermée, Céline Arnauld, Francis Picabia, Tristan Tzara, Giuseppe Ungaretti, Pierre Reverdy, Marcel Arland, Joseph Delteil, Jean Painlevé and Robert Delaunay. The other group, led by Breton, included Louis Aragon, Robert Desnos, Paul Éluard, Jacques Baron, Jacques-André Boiffard, Jean Carrive, René Crevel, and Georges Malkine.

Goll published his Manifeste du surréalisme on October 1, 1924, in the only issue of the journal Surréalisme. Two weeks later, on October 15, Breton's Manifeste du surréalisme was published by Éditions du Sagittaire.

Goll and Breton's conflicting beliefs led to a quarrel at the Comédie des Champs-Élysées over the rights to the term surrealism. Later sources describe Breton as having won. Many surrealists accepted Breton's definition while holding individual beliefs on the issues and goals of the movement.

== Breton's 1924 manifesto ==
André Breton, Manifeste du surréalisme, Éditions du Sagittaire, October 15, 1924

Breton's first manifesto defines surrealism as

Psychic automatism in its pure state, by which one proposes to express—verbally, by means of the written word, or in any other manner—the actual functioning of thought. Dictated by thought, in the absence of any control exercised by reason, exempt from any aesthetic or moral concern.

The text includes examples of applications of surrealism in poetry and literature and maintains that its tenets can be applied outside of the arts. Breton notes hypnagogia as a surreal state and the dream as a source of inspiration. The manifesto concludes that surrealism is non-conformist in nature and does not follow defined rules. It was written in an absurdist manner influenced by Dadaism.

The manifesto references the works of Marquis de Sade, Charles Baudelaire, Arthur Rimbaud, Comte de Lautréamont, Raymond Roussel, and Dante as precursors to surrealism and the poetry of Philippe Soupault, Paul Éluard, Robert Desnos and Louis Aragon as surrealist.

The manifesto named Louis Aragon, André Breton, Robert Desnos, Paul Éluard, Jacques Baron, Jacques-André Boiffard, Jean Carrive, René Crevel and Georges Malkine as members of the surrealist movement.

== Breton's later manifestos ==
In 1929, Breton sent letters to surrealists asking them to evaluate their "degree of moral competence"; later that year, he published the Second manifeste du surréalisme. The manifesto expelled surrealists hesitant to commit to collective action, including Baron, Robert Desnos, Boiffard, Michel Leiris, Raymond Queneau, Jacques Prévert and André Masson. A printed insert was published with the manifesto that was signed by the surrealists who supported Breton and agreed to participate in Surrealism at the Service of the Revolution. This group of surrealists included Maxime Alexander, Louis Aragon, Joe Bousquet, Luis Buñuel, René Char, René Crevel, Salvador Dalí, Paul Eluard, Max Ernst, Marcel Fourrier, Camille Goemans, Paul Nougé, Benjamin Péret, Francis Ponge, Marko Ristić, Georges Sadoul, Yves Tanguy, André Thirion, Tristan Tzara and Albert Valentin. Along with Ristić, the Belgrade surrealists grouped around Nadrealista Danas i Ovde were aligned with Breton.

A group of those expelled by Breton founded the magazine Documents. It was edited by Georges Bataille, whose philosophy of anti-idealist materialism encouraged surrealism focused on human base instincts.

Breton did not write a third manifesto, or at least publish it, though he did publish a “Prolegomena to a Third Manifesto or Not” (1942), a reflection or a commentary on the potential for a third manifesto, exploring how the Surrealist movement might adapt to changing times.

== See also ==
- List of most expensive books and manuscripts
- Futurist Manifesto
