= Jacques-André Boiffard =

French photographer

Jacques-André Boiffard (29 July 1902 – 22 July 1961) was a French photographer, born in Épernon in Eure-et-Loir. He was a medical student in Paris until 1924 when he met André Breton through Pierre Naville, a Surrealist writer, and childhood friend.

In the mid-1920s, Boiffard decided to dedicate himself to research in the Bureau of Surrealist Research, writing the preface with Paul Éluard and Roger Vitrac to the first issue of La Révolution surréaliste. Preferring photography to literature, he served as Man Ray’s assistant from 1924 to 1929.

During the 1920s, he took portraits of the English writer Nancy Cunard and photographs of Paris which Breton used to illustrate his novel Nadja. In 1928, Boiffard was abruptly expelled from the movement for taking photographs of Simone Breton. He co-founded a studio, Studio unis, with photographer Eli Lotar in 1929, although the studio went bankrupt in 1932.

From 1929 onward, Boiffard was closely associated with Georges Bataille and the circle of writers involved in Documents, in which his best-known work was published, illustrating articles such as Bataille’s "The Big Toe" (1929, issue 6), Robert Desnos’ "Pygmalion and the Sphinx" (1930, issue 1), and Georges Limbour’s "Eschyle, the carnival and the civilized" (1930, issue 2).

Boiffard's photographs often manipulate scale and point of view, transpose multiple exposures, and contrast brightly lit objects against darkened backgrounds. He also made several photograms. In 1930, he contributed to Un Cadavre, a pamphlet that attacked Breton.

During the political turmoil of the 1930s, Boiffard was a member of the Groupe Octobre led by Jacques Prévert, and he exhibited his work as part of the Association des Écrivains et Artistes Révolutionnaires. He accompanied members of the Groupe October to Russia in 1933. Boiffard then set out on a world tour with fellow photographer Eli Lotar. Although partly financed by museologist Georges Henri Rivière and the Vicomte de Noailles the trip came to an early end in Tangiers. Following his return to Paris, Boiffard exhibited photographs from his travel in 1934 at the Galerie de la Pléiade.

Following his father's death in 1935 Boiffard resumed his studies to earn a doctorate in medicine in 1940 specializing in radiology, once and for all putting an end to his career as a photographer. He served as a radiologist at the Hôpital Saint-Louis in Paris from 1940 to 1959. He died in Paris in 1961.
