= Cadavre =

Cadavre may refer to:

- cadaver
- Un Cadavre (A Cadaver), a surrealist pamphlet
- Cadavre exquis (surrealism)
- Cadavres (2009 film)
- A fictional character created by Kris Straub for Chainsawsuit, Broodhollow, and Local 58
