= Max Morise =

French artist, writer and actor

Max Morise (5 April 1900 – 29 October 1973) was a French artist, writer and actor, associated with the Surrealist movement in Paris from 1924 to 1929. He was friends with Robert Desnos and Roger Vitrac before they joined the Surrealist movement. He contributed articles to La Revolution Surrealiste and took part in a series of round table discussions held by the group, regarding the nature of sex. He also participated in several Surrealist games, most famously the "exquisite corpse". André Breton quotes Morise twice in the first Surrealist Manifesto; after saying "We do not have any talent", Breton provides a quote by Vitrac and Paul Éluard, then says "Ask Max Morise" and provides this quote:

The bear of the caves and his friend the bittern, the vol-au-vent and his valet the wind, the Lord Chancellor with his Lady, the scarecrow for sparrows and his accomplice the sparrow, the test tube and his daughter the needle, this carnivore and his brother the carnival, the sweeper and his monocle, the Mississippi and its little dog, the coral and its jug of milk, the Miracle and its Good Lord, might just as well go and disappear from the surface of the sea.

Later, Breton includes this quote: "The color of a woman's stockings is not necessarily in the likeness of her eyes, which led a philosopher who it is pointless to mention, to say: 'Cephalopods have more reasons to hate progress than do quadrupeds.'"

Morise also acted in several films including Ciboulette (1933), Le Crime de Monsieur Lange (1936), and Drôle de drame (1937).
