= Un Cadavre =

1924/1930 French pamphlets

Un Cadavre (A Corpse) was the name of two separate surrealist pamphlets published in France in October 1924, and January 1930, respectively.

== Pamphlet of October 18th, 1924 ==
The first pamphlet, arranged largely by André Breton and Louis Aragon, appeared in response to the national funeral of Anatole France. France, the 1921 Nobel Laureate and best-selling author, who was then regarded as the quintessential man of French letters, proved to be an easy target for an incendiary tract. The pamphlet featured an essay called Anatole France, or Gilded Mediocrity that scathingly attacked the recently deceased author on a number of fronts. The pamphlet was an act of subversion, bringing into question accepted values and conventions, which Anatole France was seen as personifying.

The effect of the pamphlet was twofold; on the one hand, it brought considerable attention to the movement of surrealism and its aims; but on the other, its disrespectful nature alienated certain sympathizers of the movement, such as the designer and art-collector Jacques Doucet, who until then had been a primary sponsor of the group, and was prompted into a parting of ways.

== Pamphlet of January 15th, 1930 ==
Cover of the 1930 pamphlet, with Breton depicted wearing a crown of thorns

The second pamphlet was arranged by a number of disaffected surrealists, sharply criticizing the movement's leader, André Breton, in response to criticism Breton made in his Second Surrealist Manifesto. The manifesto, published in December 1929, directly criticized certain members of the movement and attempted to set the course for future group activities.

The Second Manifesto attacked individuals who were already moving away from Breton, and can be regarded both as his way of formalizing the break and attacking Georges Bataille, who he feared was starting an anti-surrealist movement. The pamphlet Un Cadavre contained short essays by a number of those Breton criticized, many of whom he had formally expelled from the movement for reasons seemingly contrary to its goals, which in hindsight appear to be more a result of his famously imperious pride. For example, according to the Second Manifesto, the prose writer Georges Limbour was expelled for "literary coquetry in the worst sense of the word," a reason that emphasizes Breton's rigid disdain for literature, as opposed to poetry. Another major reason for division in the group was its increasingly politicized position, which tended toward Marxism.

The pamphlet included essays by Bataille, Limbour, Robert Desnos, Raymond Queneau, Michel Leiris, Alejo Carpentier, Jacques Baron, Jacques Prévert, Roger Vitrac, Max Morise, Georges Ribemont-Dessaignes and Jacques-André Boiffard. Though equally criticized, Antonin Artaud and Philippe Soupault declined to participate.
