= Georges Limbour =

French poet and writer (1900–1970)

Georges Limbour (11 August 1900 in Courbevoie – 17 May 1970 in Chiclana de la Frontera, near Cadiz) was a French writer, poet and art critic, and a regent of the Collège de 'Pataphysique.

== Biography ==
Limbour attended school in Le Havre, Dieppe and Géradmer where his father, a captain in the army, was stationed. His mother came from Le Havre, and the town left Limbour with an enduring fascination for the sea. His childhood friends included Jean Dubuffet and Raymond Queneau. Limbour began writing in his teens.

In October 1918 he went to Paris to study medicine, later switching to philosophy, obtaining his degree in 1923. In 1920, he signed us as a cadet officer with the army, undergoing military training in the morning and studying for his degree in the afternoons. Fellow cadets included Roger Vitrac and René Crevel, who he got to know along with other writers attached, like Limbour, to the Tour-Maubourg barracks. In 1922 he formed an enduring friendship with the painter André Masson, to whom he had been introduced by Dubuffet. He visited Masson's study at 45 rue Blomet often, where he met other artists and writers including Juan Miro, Antonin Artaud, and Michel Leiris. In 1923 he was introduced to André Breton by his Tour-Maubourg friends, and subsequently participated in the activities of the Surrealists until his break with Breton in 1929. Before his association with André Breton and the Surrealists, Limbour co-edited, along with Vitrac and Crevel, the avant-garde review Aventure (1921–22). Later, he assisted with Georges Bataille's journal Documents (1929–30), and, with a number of other dissident ex-surrealists, contributed to the anti-Breton pamphlet Un Cadavre.

Limbour spent much of his early adult life outside of France. In 1924 he traveled to the Rhine to work as a journalist attached to the French army. On 14 July, from the steps of the Mainz Opera House, he shouted 'down with France', and encouraged the local German population to throw out the French army. This action attracted praise from Breton, but resulted in Limbour being expelled from Germany. Later that year he went to Albania to teach philosophy, then to Egypt in 1926 where he remained until 1928. In 1930 he joined the French Lycée in Warsaw, teaching there until the onset of war made it impossible to stay. In 1938 he was appointed to a teaching position in Parthenay in Western France, but was then mobilized with the outbreak of the war. He took part in some of the early fighting and was demobilized with the armistice in 1940. Later he taught in Dieppe, and then, from 1955, in Paris, at the Lycée Jean-Baptiste-Say. He retired from teaching in 1963.

Limbour spent many of his holidays in Spain, a country he loved and where he set two of his novels. He died in a diving accident off the Spanish coast in 1970.

== Work ==
Limbour wrote a number of short stories (collected after his death in two volumes), four novels, a play (first staged in 1954), three opera librettos (only one of which was performed), and poetry. The early stories show the influence of surrealism and 'automatic writing' methods but in the later work, including the novels, Limbour developed a magical and distinctive style. He was greatly admired by his contemporaries, including Max Jacob, Jean Paulhan, Jean Cocteau, Queneau, and Leiris. Limbour was appointed a regent of the College de 'Pataphysique in 1960, with Dubuffet and Queneau among his nominators. Michel Leiris, writing in Atoll in 1968, described Limbour as: "a great poet in every heart-beat of what he wrote, but a poet without fanfare or vain display".

Little of Limbour's work has so far appeared in English. Some of the short stories have been translated, these include: 'The Polar Child' (1922), 'The Lancashire Actor' (1923), 'Glass Eyes' (1924), and 'The Panorama' (1935), 'The Hand of Fatima' (1929), 'The White Dog' (1953), and three 'African Tales' (1968). An essay, 'Aeschylus, Carnival and the Civilised', published in Documents, II.2 (1930) is also available in English translation.

From 1944 on Limbour wrote innumerable essays, catalogue introductions and reviews about art, as well as books on Masson and Dubuffet. In 1943 Limbour took the writer and critic Jean Paulhan to the studio of Jean Dubuffet, whose work was then unknown. This meeting was a decisive moment in Dubuffet's career. Paulhan introduced Dubuffet to the gallery owner René Drouin, and the artist had his first public show the following year.

== Bibliography ==
=== Poetry ===
Soleils bas, eaux-fortes d'André Masson, Paris, Galerie Simon, 1924

=== Stories and novels ===
- L'Illustre cheval blanc (stories), Paris, Gallimard, 1930
- Les Vanilliers (novel), Paris, Gallimard, 1938 (Prix Rencontre, 1938); Paris, L'Imaginaire, Gallimard, 1978
- La Pie voleuse (novel), Paris, Gallimard, 1939; Paris, L'Imaginaire, Gallimard, 1995 [première partie écrite en 1936]
- L'Enfant polaire (story, written 1921), Paris, Fontaine, 1945
- Le Bridge de Madame Lyane (novel), Paris, Gallimard, 1948
- Le Calligraphe (story), Paris, Galerie Louise Leiris, 1959
- La Chasse au mérou (novel), Paris, Gallimard, 1963
- Soleils bas, suivi de poèmes, de contes et de récits, 1919-1968, (poetry and stories), préface de Michel Leiris, Paris, Poésie/Gallimard, 1972 [includes L'Enfant polaire, Histoire de famille (1930), the last of the three stories which make up L'Illustre cheval blanc (1930), and Le calligraphe, (1959)]
- Contes et récits, (stories) Paris, Gallimard, 1973, [includes, L'Acteur du Lancashire ou L'Illustre cheval blanc (1923) and Le Cheval de Venise (1924), two of the three stories which make up L'Illustre cheval blanc, 1930]
- Le Carnaval et les civilisés, préface de Michel Leiris, dessins d'André Masson, Paris, L'Elocoquent, 1986 [texts which appeared in revues, 1930-1968)] (ISBN 2868260004)

=== Theatre ===
- Les Espagnols à Venise (opéra-bouffe), in Mélanges Kahnweiler, Stuttgart, Hatje, 1966 (first performed in Grenoble in 1970, music by René Leibowitz)
- Élocoquente, Le manteau d'Arlequin, Paris, Gallimard, 1967

=== On painting ===
- André Masson et son univers, en collaboration avec Michel Leiris, Lausanne, Les Trois collines, 1947
- André Masson dessins, Collection « Plastique », Paris, Éditions Braun, 1951
- L'Art brut de Jean Dubuffet (Tableau bon levain à vous de cuire la pâte), Paris, Éditions Galerie René Drouin, 1953
- Préface à André Masson, Entretiens avec Georges Charbonnier, Paris, Julliard, 1958
- André Beaudin, Paris, Verve, 1961
- Hayter, Paris, Le Musée de Poche, Éditions Georges Fall, 1962
- Dans le secret des ateliers, Paris, L'Elocoquent, 1986 [texts which appeared in revues, 1946-1971, sur Masson, Dubuffet, Braque, Elie Lascaux, Giacometti, Germaine Richier, Picasso, Kandinsky, Nicolas de Staël, Ubac, Palazuelo, Tal Coat, Rouvre, Hayter] (ISBN 2868260012)
- Spectateur des arts, Écrits sur la peinture 1924-1969 (édition de Martine Colin-Picon et Françoise Nicol), Paris, Le Bruit du Temps, 2013.
