= Jacques Baron =

French poet (1905–1986)

Jacques Baron (1905–1986) was a French surrealist poet whose first collection of poems was published in Aventure in 1921. Although he was initially involved with the Dada movement, he became a founding member of the Surrealist movement following his meeting with André Breton in 1921, and contributed to La Révolution surréaliste. In 1927, like many of his contemporaries, Baron joined the Cercle Communiste Démocratique. Although fascinated by dream-like states of the nomadic unconscious and other imaginary worlds of the "marvelous", a dispute with Breton in 1929 got him expelled from the movement, and prompted him to contribute to Un Cadavre, an anti-Breton pamphlet. After the break with Surrealism, Baron became associated with Georges Bataille and Documents, in which he published a short essay on "Crustaceans for the Critical Dictionary" (1929, issue 6), an article on the sculptor Jacques Lipchitz (1930, issue 1), and a poem dedicated to Picasso, "Flames" (1930, issue 3). He later collaborated on a number of reviews such as Le Voyage en Grèce, La Critique Sociale and Minotaure. Baron also wrote a novel, Charbon de mer (1935), a mémoire, L’An 1 du Surréalisme (1969), and a collection of poems, L’Allure poétique (1973).

== Bibliography ==
- Brandon, Ruth. Surreal Lives: The Surrealists, 1917-1945. London: Macmillan, 1999.
- Short, Robert. "The Politics of Surrealism, 1920-1936." Journal of Contemporary History 1 (1966).
- Spiteri, Raymond. "Envisioning Surrealism in Histoire De L'OEil and la Femme 100 Tetes." Art Journal 63 (2004).
