= Eli Lotar Park =

Public park in France

Coordinates: 48°55′05″N 2°22′18″E

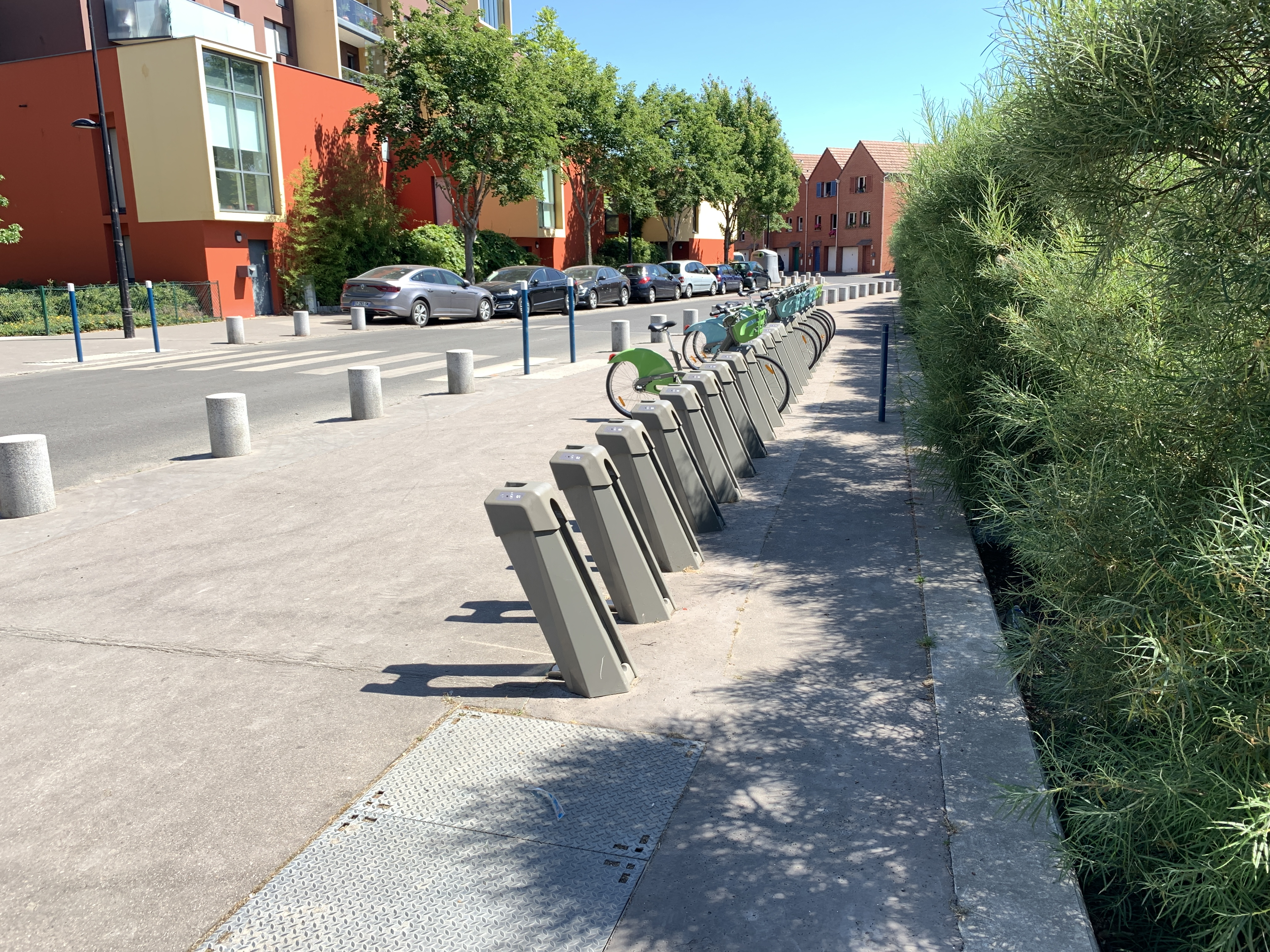
Vélib' station outside the park (2020 photograph)

The Eli Lotar Park is a 10,000 m^{2} (12,000 square yards) public park and playground located on the Quai Jean-Marie Tjibaou, along the canal Saint-Denis in the commune of Aubervilliers, France. The park is named after French photographer and cinematographer Eli Lotar.
