= Roger Vitrac =

French surrealist playwright and poet (1899–1952)

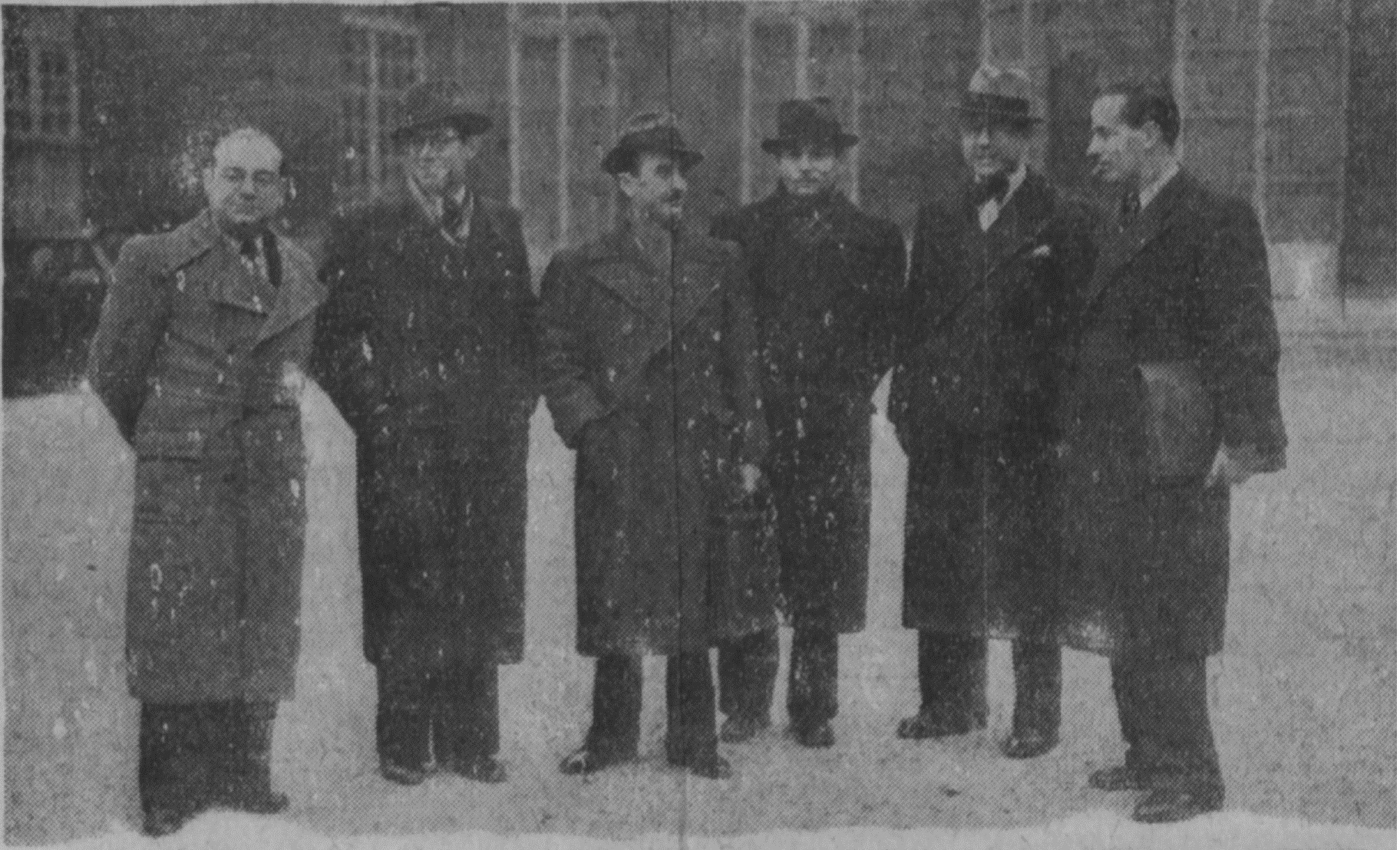
- Vitrac (centre) with Bureau confédéral des SPF (1938)
- Born: 17 November 1899; Pinsac, France
- Died: 22 January 1952 (aged 52); Paris, France
- Occupation: Writer

Roger Vitrac (French: [vitʁak]; 17 November 1899 – 22 January 1952) was a French surrealist playwright and poet.

== Early life ==
Roger Vitrac was born in Pinsac, France, on 17 November 1899, before his family moved to Paris in 1910.^{:527} As a young man, he was influenced by the period's theatre and poetry, in particular the works of Lautréamont and Alfred Jarry.^{:527} In the late 1920s, he married Kitty Cannell, a dancer and actress who performed at the Provincetown Playhouse.^{:265}

== Career ==
In 1919, he published his first collection of poems, Le Faune noir. In 1920, he began his obligatory three-year military service.^{:527} While serving, he was introduced to Dadaist performances in Paris and became interested in the movement. He even 'took to distributing Dada manifestos in the barracks'.^{:358} He also 'presented a play in Dadaistic character' entitled La Fenêtre Vorace, which has since been lost.^{:358} It was during this time that he met Marcel Arland, François Baron, Georges Limbour and René Crevel, and founded the literary revue, Aventure.^{:527}

Aventure n° 1, nov 1921

In 1921, Vitrac met André Breton and Louis Aragon at the Café Certa, which was one of the headquarters for Dada, and later Surrealist, activities. That same year, he attended the Dadaist Excursion to the Church of Saint-Julien-le-Pauvre and become formally associated with the Dadaists. He would continue to develop this network as a founding member of the Surrealist movement and one of the signatories of Breton's First Surrealist Manifesto (1924). He was expelled from the movement in 1925 for his pursuit of the theatre, among other infractions.^{:527}

=== Theater Alfred Jarry ===
In 1926, Vitrac founded the Théatre Alfred-Jarry with Robert Aron and Antonin Artaud (who was also expelled from the Surrealist movement). It was here that Vitrac premiered his plays, Les Mystères de l'amour [The Mysteries of Love] (1927), as well as his best known work Victor ou les enfants au pouvoir [Victor, or Power to the Children](1928).

=== Later works ===
Vitrac joined Georges Bataille as one of the signatories of Un Cadavre against Breton and contributed to Documents with articles on "Gaston-Louis Roux" (1929, issue 7), "The Abduction of the Sabines" (1930, issue 6) and a poem, "Humorage to Picasso" (1930, issue 3), dedicated to the artist. From 1931, he worked as a journalist while further exploring burlesque style playwriting, which often operated between boulevard comedy and intimate tragedy. His multi-thematic Coup de Trafalgar (1934) and Les Demoiselles du large (1938) gained as little recognition as his more slapstick plays such as Le Loup-Garou (1939) and Le Sabre de mon père (1951).

In January 1937, Vitrac become Secretary General of the newly established Confédération des Syndicats Professionels Française (CSPF), a workers' union that claimed to be 'purely professional' and 'free of any political affiliation.'^{:212-213}

== Death ==
Vitrac died in Paris on 22 January 1952.^{:527}

== Legacy ==
Only after his death did Vitrac reach popular stardom with Jean Anouilh's 1962 production of Victor, or Power to the Children. Though it was written after Vitrac was expelled from the Surrealist movement, Victor is often viewed as the key masterpiece of surrealist theatre,^{:94}
