= Jean Painlevé =

French film director and photographer (1902–1989)

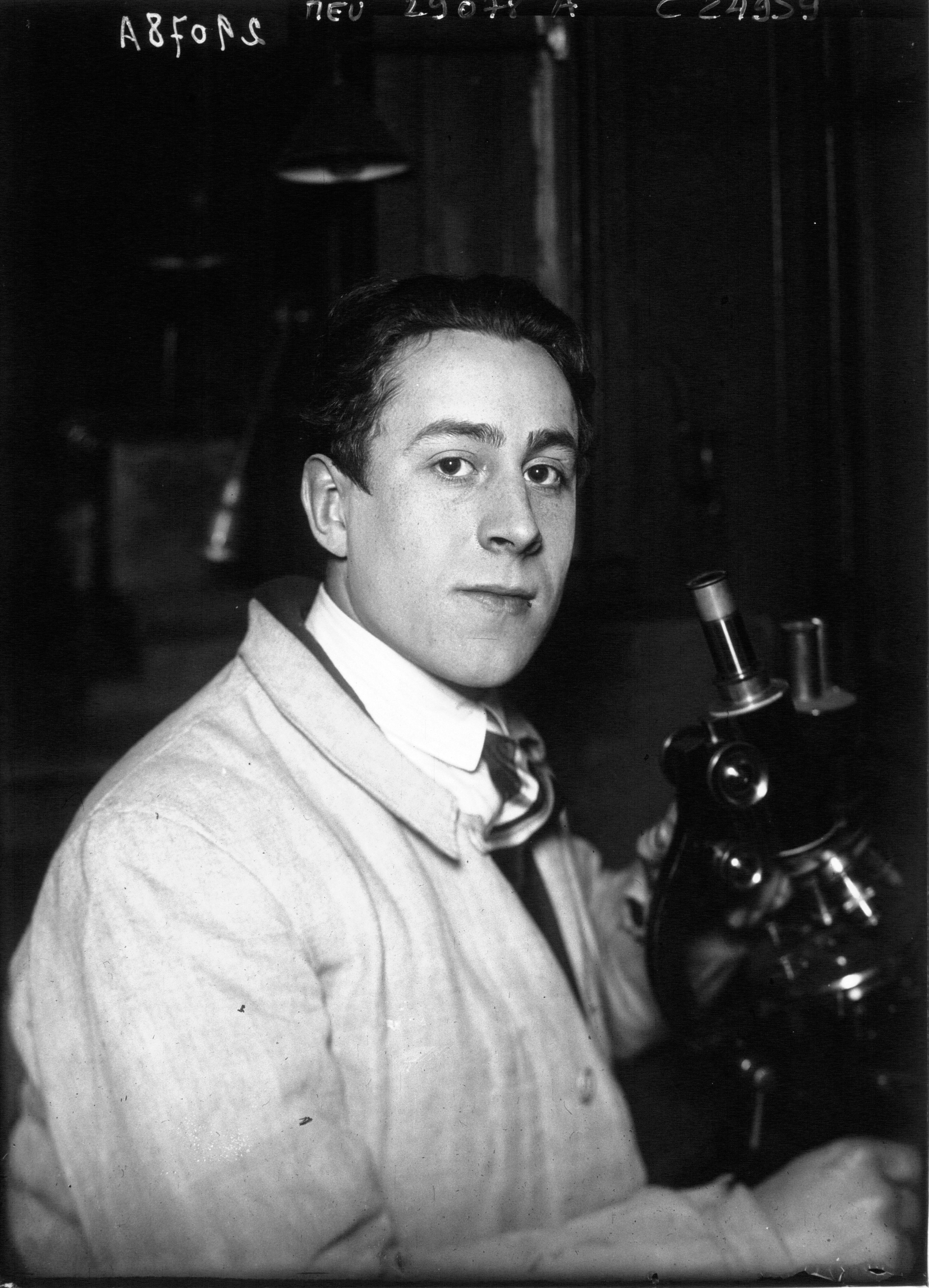
- Jean Painlevé at the Sorbonne in 1926
- Born: 20 November 1902; Paris, France
- Died: 2 July 1989 (aged 86); Neuilly-sur-Seine, France
- Occupations: Photographer filmmaker
- Years active: 1927–1982
- Partner: Geneviève Hamon

Jean Painlevé (20 November 1902 – 2 July 1989) was a French photographer and filmmaker who specialized in underwater fauna. He was the son of mathematician and twice prime minister of France Paul Painlevé.

== Upbringing ==
A few days after Painlevé was born, his mother, Marguerite Petit de Villeneuve, died from complications arising from an infection contracted during childbirth. Painlevé, an only son, was raised by his father's sister Marie, a widow.

In the Lycée Louis Le Grand, he was a poor and inattentive student who preferred to skip classes and go to the Jardin d'Acclimatation where he was assisting the guard in taking care of the animals. Painlevé later wrote: "In high school, my classmates hated me. They hated people in the margins, such as Vigo, son of the anarchist Almereyda, or Pierre Merle, son of Eugène Merle, director of [satirical weekly] Merle Blanc ("White Blackbird"). Me, I was the son of a Boche ("Kraut)", that Painlevé who had fought for Sarrail, solitary and unique republican general, and who had relieved [general] Nivelle of his duties to replace him with Pétain". He finished high school well apart "from these poor, unhappy ones who were like tradesmen in their trade". Among the few friends he made in his adolescence were future film critic Georges Altman, and writer and precious stones specialist Armand Moss (Moschowitz), who later appeared as an extra in Mathusalem.

== Studies ==
Painlevé had to abandon his studies aimed at entering the École Polytechnique because he understood practically nothing of Mathematics. (He would subsequently state he wished that mathematics was approached "like a language and not like a mystery"). Instead, he turned to medicine. However, two years into his studies, he abandoned the class of Professor Delbet, on account of the professor's treatment of a hydroencephalic patient which Painlevé found cruel, never to come back. He next turned to biology and entered the Laboratoire d'Anatomie et d'Histologie Comparée at the Sorbonne.

== Personal life ==
In the course of his studies in biology, Painlevé started frequenting the Station biologique de Roscoff. There, he met Viviane, Geneviève ("Ginette"), and Maryvonne Hamon, the three daughters of Augustin and Henriette Hamon, translators of the works of George Bernard Shaw in France and anarchist militants. Ginette would become Painlevé's work partner and life companion.

The Hamons' residence in Port Blanc, Penvenan, named "Ty an Diaoul", (which some locals had dubbed "Maison du Diable", "House of the Devil") eventually became a second home for Painlevé.

== Political influences and militancy ==
Painlevé, along with Georges Altman and others, in 1918, created in his school an affiliate union to the "Socialist Revolutionary Students", an anarchist organisation established in the previous century. Painlevé himself was in the streets, distributing pamphlets calling on passers-by to join up. After two years, in 1920, he left the group to join the union of "Communist Students".

His acquaintance with the Hamons familiarised Painlevé with the active practice of anarchism and teaching it by example. Augustin Hamon and his wife wanted their children to be raised in the altruist culture and under anarchist principles, so they had no objections to their young daughter living with Jean Painlevé as an unmarried couple ("living in sin"), something socially unacceptable in Catholic France, and, even more so, in deeply Catholic Penvenan, where the Hamons resided.

The Hamon family and their lifestyle influenced Jean Painlevé not only in his politics but in his outlook on life in general. Painlevé joined the Hamon daughters, all of whom would go on to become scientists, in their quest to acquire knowledge on everything. At the same time, Augustin Hamon encouraged not just young, inquisitive scientists, but also young artists with radical and controversial ideas, to come visit in his home, in Brittany. Painlevé would make numerous acquaintances among the visitors, such as Calder, Pierre Prévert, Jacques-Alain Boiffard, and Eli Lotar.

== Contact with Surrealism ==
Prévert and Boiffard were part of the Surrealist wave and brought Jean Painlevé in contact with the artists active in the movement. Painlevé started collaborating with the monthly revue Surrealisme, directed by Yvan Goll. In 1924, the revue published an article by Painlevé titled "Exemple de surréalisme : le cinéma". In the article, which could be considered a declaration of principles, Painlevé preached the "recording of reality", which, added to the imagination of the screenwriter and cinema's techniques of slow motion, accelerated speed and the blur, can create "a surrealist esthetic". Most of Painlevé's subsequent designs on cinema are gathered in this article, where he affirmed "the superiority of reality", the "extraordinary inventiveness of Nature", over "the artifice" of traditional cinematographical scenes.

Painlevé, like Guillaume Apollinaire in 1909, claimed that "the cinema is a creator of a surreal life".

One year later, in 1925, after a communication with l'Académie des Sciences, he submitted a pseudo-scientific, nonsensical and entirely Surrealist text, which he titled "Neo-zoological Drama".

Painlevé cannot be considered part of the Surrealist movement and did not actually consider himself a surrealist. He did, however, share the surrealists' interest in psycho-sexual stimulation and the ultimate weirdness of procreation.

== Cinema ==
Painlevé's 1928 film La Pieuvre, a study of the octopus

Painlevé first came to the cinema as an actor, alongside Michel Simon, and also as assistant director in the René Sti unfinished film L'inconnue des six jours (The Unknown Woman of Six Days), 1926. Soon, he was shooting his own films, starting with L'œuf d'épinoche : de la fécondation à l'éclosion, 1927.

Painlevé sometimes scored the music and background sounds for his films, such as in Les Oursins, where the collage of noise is a homage to Edgar Varèse.

In order to shoot scenes underwater, Painlevé encased his camera in a custom designed waterproof box, fitted with a glass plate which allowed the camera's lens to reach through. Understandably, he spent a lot of time submerged in water. In his 1935 essay, titled "Feet In The Water", Painlevé discussed wading, its instinctive, sensual pleasure and thwarted desire: "Wading around in water up to your ankles or navel, day and night, in all kinds of weather, even in areas where one is sure to find nothing, digging about everywhere for algae or octopus, getting hypnotised by a sinister pond where everything seems to promise marvels although nothing lives there. This is the ecstasy of any addict."

Overall Jean Painlevé directed more than two hundred science and nature films.

He also marketed a collection of brass and bakelite jewelry in the form of seahorses.

Science is Fiction: 23 Films by Jean Painlevé, a DVD collection of his films, was released in 2009 by the Criterion Collection.

== Legacy ==
Advocating the credo "science is fiction," Painlevé managed to scandalize both the scientific and the cinematographic world with a cinema designed to entertain as well as edify. He portrayed sea horses, vampire bats, skeleton shrimps, and fanworms as endowed with human traits – the erotic, the comical, and the savage. Painlevé single-handedly established a unique kind of cinema, the "scientific-poetic cinema".

== Selected filmography ==
- Pigeons in the Square (1982)
- Cristaux Liquides... aka Liquid Crystals (1978)
- Acera ou Le bal des sorcières (1972)... aka Acera, or the Witches’ Dance
- Diatoms (1968)
- Amours de la pieuvre (1965)... aka Love Life of the Octopus
- Histoires de crevettes (1964)... aka Shrimp Stories
- Comment naissent les méduses (1960)... aka How Some Jellyfish Are Born
- Les Alpes (1958)
- L'Astérie (1958)
- Les Oursins (1958)... aka Sea Urchins
- Les Danseuses de mer (1956)... aka Sea Ballerinas
- La Chirurgie correctrice (1948)
- Écriture de la danse (1948)
- Assassins d'eau douce (1947)... aka Fresh Water Assassins
- Notre planète la Terre (1947)
- Pasteur (1947)
- Jeux d'enfants (1946)
- Le Vampire (1945)... aka The Vampire
- Solutions françaises (1939)
- Images mathématiques de la lutte pour la vie (1937)... aka The Struggle for Survival
- Similitudes des longueurs et des vitesses (1937)... aka Similarities Between Length and Speed
- Images mathématiques de la quatrième dimension (1937)... aka The Fourth Dimension
- Voyage dans le ciel (1937)... aka Voyage to the Sky
- Barbe-Bleue (1936)... aka Bluebeard (USA)
- Microscopie à bord d'un bateau de pêche (1936)
- Corèthre (1935)
- L'Hippocampe (1934)... aka The Sea Horse (UK)
- Électrophorèse de nitrate d'argent (1932)
- Ruptures de fibres (1931)
- Bernard-l'hermite (1930)... aka The Hermit Crab
- Traitement expérimental d'une hémorragie chez le chien (1930)... aka Experimental Treatment of a Hemorrhage in a Dog
- Les Crabes (1930)
- La Daphnie (1929)... Daphnia
- Hyas et stenorinques (1929)... aka Hyas and Stenorhynchus
- Les Oursins (1929)... aka Sea Urchins (USA)
- La Pieuvre (1928)... aka Devilfish (USA)
- The Octopus (1927)
- L'œuf d'épinoche : de la fécondation à l'éclosion (1927)... aka The Stickleback's Egg (USA)

== Sources ==
- Jean Painlevé Archives: Les Documents Cinématographiques, Paris.
- A consequent interview on scientific cinema and research, edited in french Revue l'Education (1978) with some photos (tirage : 200 000 exemplaires)
- Les Independants du Cinéma, providing additional sources, (in French)
- Jean Painlevé at IMDb
