= Madroñera =

Coordinates: 39°26′N 5°46′W

Madroñera, Spain
- municipality
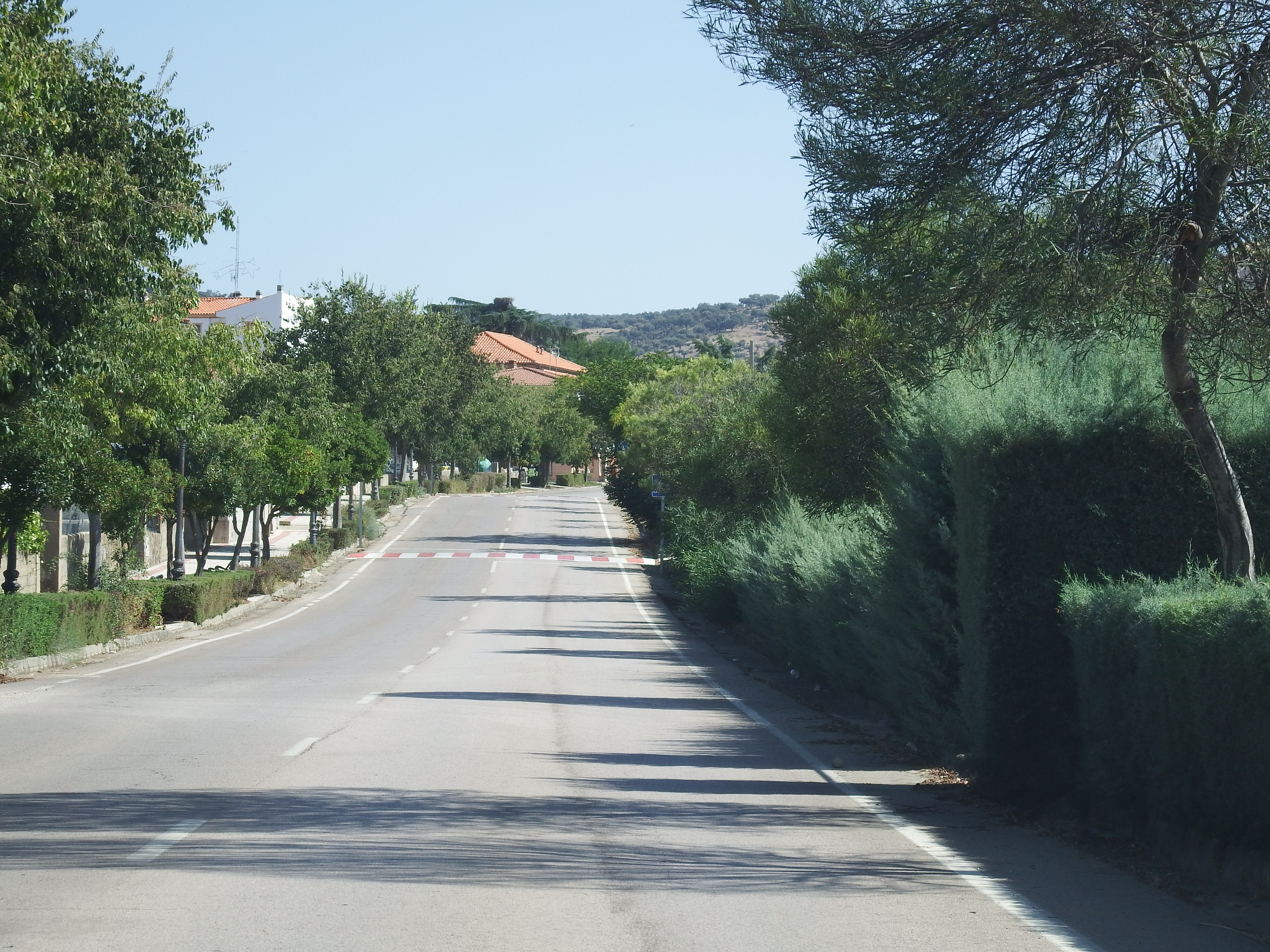
- Streets of Madroñera

- Coat of arms

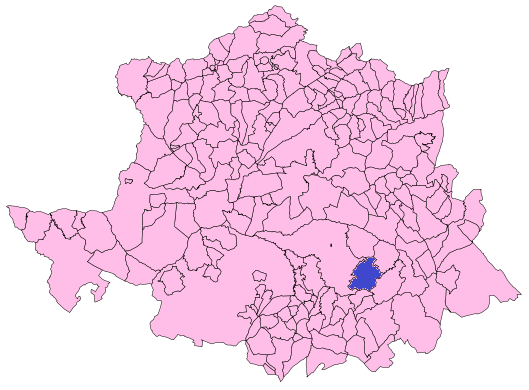
- Map of Madroñera
- Country: Spain
- Autonomous community: Extremadura
- Province: Cáceres
- Municipality: Madroñera

Area
  - Total: 132 km^{2} (51 sq mi)

Population (2025-01-01)
  - Total: 2,349
  - Density: 17.8/km^{2} (46.1/sq mi)
- Time zone: UTC+1 (CET)
  - Summer (DST): UTC+2 (CEST)

Madroñera (Spanish pronunciation: [ma.ðɾoˈɲe.ɾa]) is a municipality located in the province of Cáceres, Extremadura, Spain. According to the 2006 census (INE), the municipality has a population of 2910 inhabitants.

== See also ==
- List of municipalities in Cáceres
