= Pinsac =

- Commune
- Location of Pinsac
- Location within France Location within Occitanie
- Coordinates: 44°51′23″N 1°30′53″E
- Country: France
- Region: Occitania
- Department: Lot
- Arrondissement: Gourdon
- Canton: Souillac
- Intercommunality: Causses et Vallée de la Dordogne

Government
  - Mayor (2020–2026): Régis Villepontoux
- Area^{1}: 19.69 km^{2} (7.60 sq mi)
- Elevation: 1,153 m (3,783 ft)
- Highest elevation: 329 m (1,079 ft)
- Lowest elevation: 80 m (260 ft)
- Population (2023): 769
  - Density: 39.1/km^{2} (101/sq mi)
- Time zone: UTC+01:00 (CET)
  - Summer (DST): UTC+02:00 (CEST)
- INSEE/Postal code: 46220 /46200
- ^{1} French Land Register data, which excludes lakes, ponds, glaciers > 1 km^{2} (0.386 sq mi or 247 acres) and river estuaries.

Pinsac (French pronunciation: [pɛ̃sak]; Occitan: Pinçac) is a commune in the Lot department in south-western France.

== See also ==
- Communes of the Lot department
