= Fermín Solís =

Spanish cartoonist, animator, and illustrator (born 1972)

Fermín Solís Campos
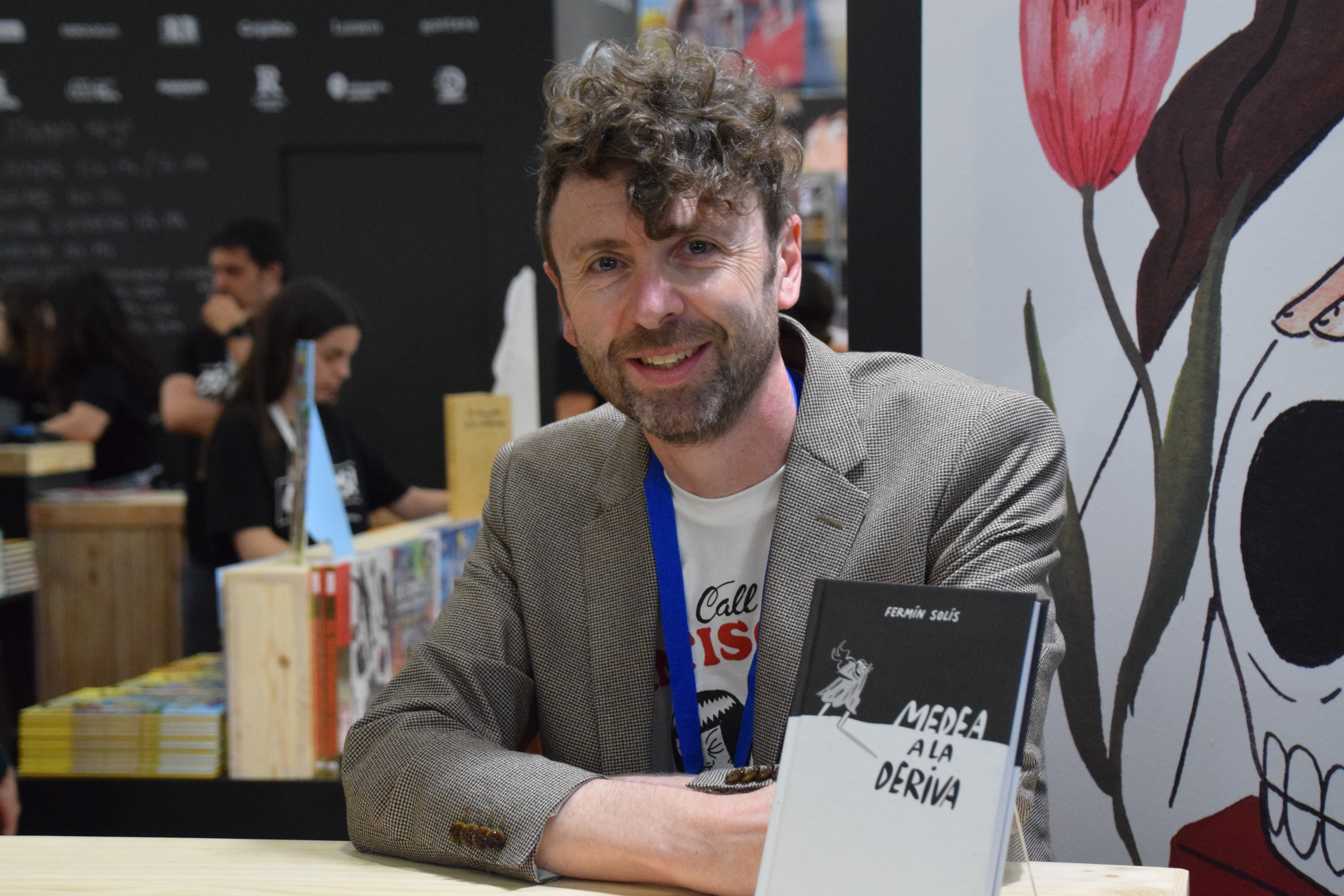
- Fermín Solís at the Barcelona Comic Fair (2022)
- Born: 16 May 1972 (age 54) Madroñera, Cáceres, Spain
- Area: Cartoonist

Fermín Solís Campos (born 16 May 1972) is a Spanish cartoonist, animator, and illustrator. Born in Madroñera, Cáceres, Extremadura, his illustrations have appeared in Clio, Época and Rockdelux. He is the author of numerous graphic novels and books; “his stories are about everyday life, relations, searching, coincidences, everything mixed with a small dosis of surrealism.”

Solís is self-taught, and his style was influenced by the work of Seth, Andi Watson, and Dupuy and Berberian.

He won the prize known as Certamen de Cómic e Ilustración at INJUVE in 2002 and the prize known as Autor Revelación in the Barcelona Comics Festival (Salón del Cómic de Barcelona) in 2004.

== Books ==
- Dando Tumbos (Subterfuge 2000)
- Otra Vida (D2ble D2sis, 2001)
- No te Quiero Pero te Amo un Poco (Aralia, 2002)
- Los Días Más Largos (Balboa, 2003)
- Un Pie Tras Otro (Plan B, 2003)
- No te quiero, pero… (Astiberri, 2004)
- Dan Laxante, Detective Cotidiano (Tebeo Vivo, 2004)
- De Ballenas y Pulgas (Ariadna Editorial, 2004)
- El Hombre del Perrito (Astiberri, 2005)
- El Año que Vimos Nevar (Astiberri, 2005)
- Las Pelusas de mi Ombligo # 1 (Cabezabajo, 2006)
- Lunas de Papel (Dib-buks, 2007)
- Las Pelusas de mi Ombligo #2 (Dolmen 2007)
- Astro-Ratón y Bombillita # 1: Parece que Chispea (Mamut, 2008)
- Buñuel en el Laberinto de las Tortugas (Editora Regional de Extremadura)
