= Ramón Acín =

Spanish painter

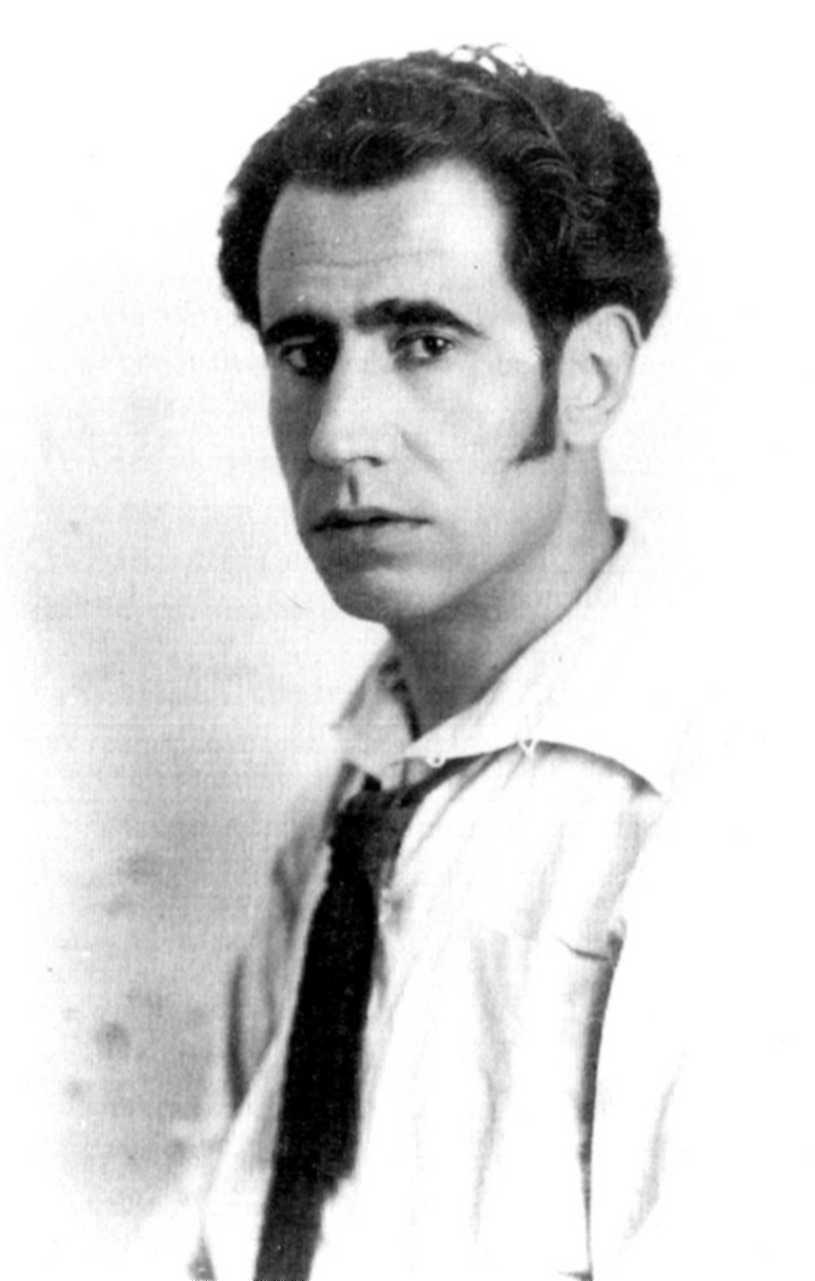
- Born: Ramón Acín Aquilué; 30 August 1888; Huesca, Aragon, Spain
- Died: 6 August 1936 (aged 47); Huesca, Aragon, Spain
- Education: University of Zaragoza
- Occupations: Painter, writer, teacher, film producer
- Years active: 1910–1936
- Political party: Popular Front
- Spouse: Conchita Monrás (m. 1923–1936)
- Children: Katia Acín Monrás (1923–2004); Sol Acín (1925–1998)

Ramón Acín Aquilué (30 August 1888, Huesca, Aragon, Spain – 6 August 1936) was a Spanish anarcho-syndicalist, teacher, painter, sculptor, writer and avant-garde artist who was murdered by fascists in the first year of the Spanish Civil War.

Acín was a friend of film director Luis Buñuel and provided some of the money for Las Hurdes: Tierra Sin Pan (1932) and so is credited as co-producer of the film.

== Biography ==
Ramón Acín Aquilué was the son of Santos Acín Muliera, a surveyor engineer, and María Aquilué Royán. Ramón was the youngest of four siblings. Ramón's other siblings were named Santos, Ascensión, and Enriqueta. Acín was interested in painting from an early age, beginning drawing classes with the painter Felix Lafuente at the age of 10. At 12 he entered the Second Teaching Institute in Huesca. In 1907 he enrolled in chemical sciences at the Faculty of Sciences of Zaragoza.

Towards the end of 1908 Acín left his career in chemistry and returned to Huesca. He was supposed to join the army in 1909, but was freed of military service because his parents were in their sixties. The same year he went to Madrid to oppose a public works project, fails to defeat it, and returns to Huesca to take drawing classes in the prive academy of the painter Anselmo Gascón de Gotor.

Afterwards Acín decided to dedicate himself exclusively to art. In August 1910 El Diario de Avisios de Zaragoza published his first illustrations. In August 1911 his illustration of the celebrations of San Lorenzo were used as the cover of the magazine and at the end of the same year one of his drawings was used as the cover of the satirical magazine Don Pepito.

In January 1912 El Diaro de Huesca came under the direction of Luis López Allué and Acín was put in charge of the humor section where he used the pen name "Fray Acin". At the same time Acín began to published political cartoons with other progressive newspapers: El Pueblo, Vida Socialista, and others.

In July 1913 Acín settled in Barcelona at the request of his friend Ángel Samblancat with whom he founded the weekly newspaper La Ira. In the first issue of La Ira he published a vignette entitled Id Vosotros which fiercely criticized the war with Morocco. In the second he wrote No Riais, a hash criticism of the church. After the second issue the editors of La Ira were imprisoned and the newspaper closed.

=== Execution ===
With the 1936 coup d'état, Acín fought against the fascist-aligned military rebellion until he was forced to hide after Huesca was besieged by the nationalists. On 6 August 1936 Acín emerged from hiding in order to protect his wife and was executed. His wife Conchita was murdered seventeen days later, along with a hundred Republican soldiers.
