= Michel Leiris =

French writer (1901–1990)

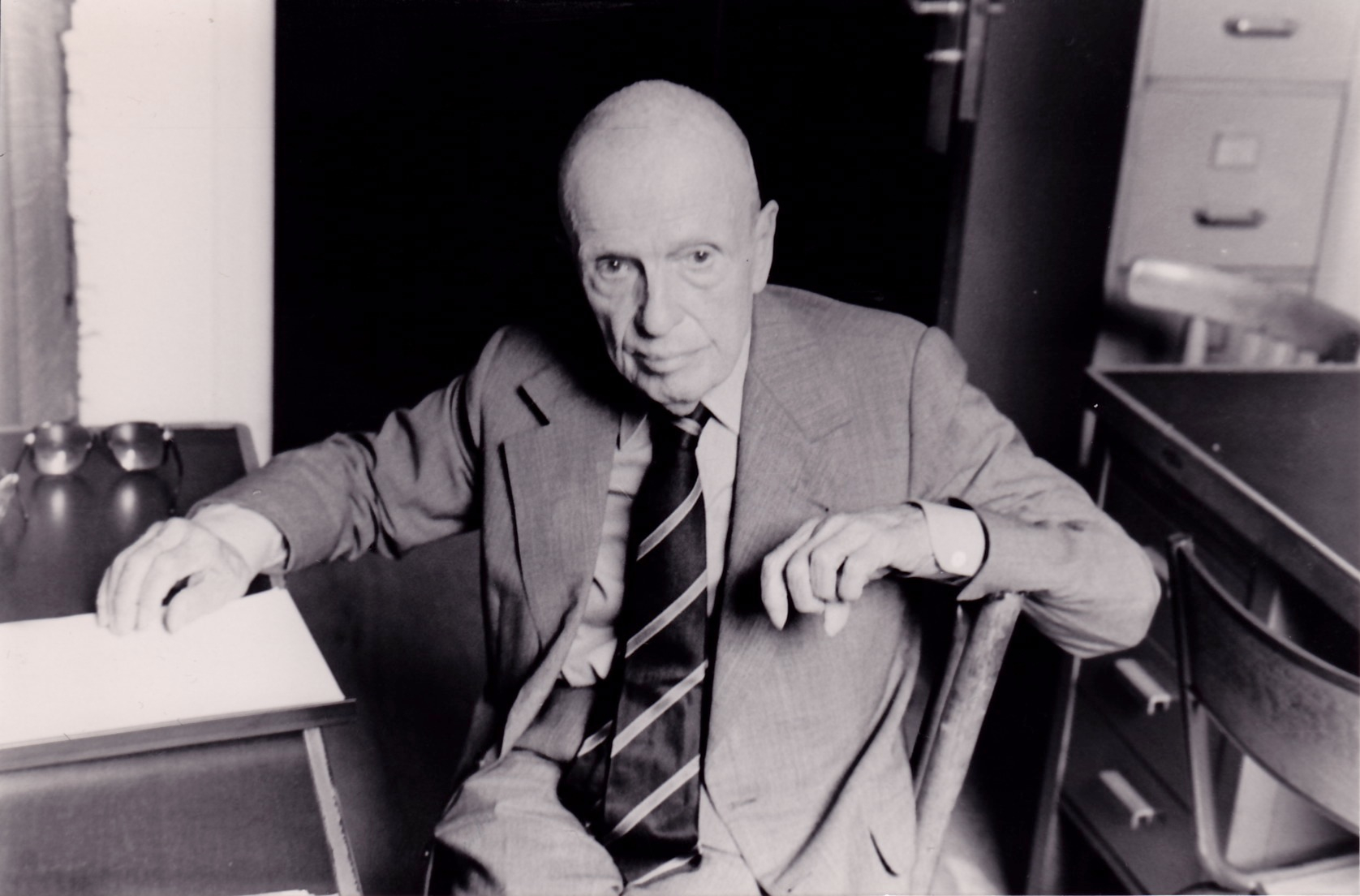
Michel Leiris

Julien Michel Leiris (French: [lɛʁis]; 20 April 1901, Paris – 30 September 1990, Saint-Hilaire, Essonne) was a French surrealist writer and ethnographer. Part of the Surrealist group in Paris, Leiris became a key member of the College of Sociology with Georges Bataille and head of research in ethnography at the CNRS.

== Biography ==
Michel Leiris obtained his baccalauréat in philosophy at the Lycée Janson de Sailly in 1918 and after a brief attempt at studying chemistry, he developed a strong interest in jazz and poetry. Between 1921 and 1924, Leiris met a number of important figures such as Max Jacob, Georges Henri Rivière, Jean Dubuffet, Robert Desnos, Georges Bataille and the artist André Masson, who soon became his mentor. Through Masson, Leiris became a member of the Surrealist movement, contributed to La Révolution surréaliste, published Simulacre (1925), and Le Point Cardinal (1927), and wrote a surrealist novel Aurora (1927–28; first published in 1946). In 1926, he married Louise Godon, the stepdaughter of Picasso's art dealer Daniel-Henry Kahnweiler and traveled to Egypt and Greece.

Following a falling-out with the surrealist leader André Breton in 1929, Leiris contributed an essay to the anti-Breton pamphlet Un Cadavre, and joined Bataille's team as a sub-editor for Documents, to which he also regularly contributed articles such as “Notes on Two Microcosmic Figures of the 14th and 15th Centuries” (1929, issue 1), “In Connection with the ‘Musée des Sorciers'" (1929, issue 2), "Civilisation" (1929, issue 4), “The ‘Caput Mortuum’ or the Alchemist's Wife” (1930, issue 8), and on artists such as Giacometti, Miró, Picasso, and the 16th Century painter Antoine Caron. He also wrote an article on “The Ethnographer’s Eye (concerning the Dakar-Djibouti mission)” before setting off in 1930 as the secretary-archivist in Marcel Griaule's ambitious ethnographic expedition. From this experience, Leiris published his first important book in 1934, L’Afrique fantôme, combining both an ethnographic study and an autobiographical project, which broke with the traditional ethnographic writing style of Griaule. Upon his return, he started his practice as an ethnographer at the Musée de l'Homme, a position he kept until 1971.

In 1937, Leiris teamed up with Bataille and Roger Caillois to found the Collège de sociologie in response to the current international situation. Increasingly involved in politics, he took part in a mission to Côte d'Ivoire in the French colonies, in 1945. As a member of Jean-Paul Sartre's editorial committee for Les Temps modernes, Leiris was involved in a series of political struggles, including the Algerian War, and was one of the first to sign the Déclaration sur le droit à l'insoumission dans la guerre d'Algérie, the 1960 manifesto supporting the fight against the colonial forces in Algeria.

In 1961, Leiris was made head of research in ethnography at the C.N.R.S. (Centre national de la recherche scientifique) and published numerous critical texts on artists he admired, including Francis Bacon, a close friend for whom he had modeled. That year he also published Nuits sans nuit et quelques jours sans jour (Nights as Day, Days as Night).

Considered a leading figure in 20th century French literature, sociology, and cultural criticism, Michel Leiris left a considerable number of works. These range from autobiographical works such as L’Âge d’homme (1939), La Règle du jeu (1948–1976) and his Journal 1922-1989 (published posthumously in 1992); art criticism such as Au verso des images (1980) and Francis Bacon face et profil (1983); music criticism such as Operratiques (1992); and scientific contributions such as La Langue secrète des Dogons de Saga (1948) and Race et civilisation (1951). His fields of interest in anthropology ranged from bullfighting to possession in Gondar, Ethiopia.

With Jean Jamin, Leiris founded Gradhiva, a journal of anthropology in 1986. The journal is now the journal of anthropology and museology of the Musée du quai Branly (Paris, France).

Leiris was also a talented poet, and poetry was important in his approach to the world. In his preface to Haut Mal, suivi de Autres lancers (1969), Alain Jouffroy quotes Leiris (from Fibrilles) that "the practice of poetry [...] postulates the other as one's equal" and (from L’Âge d’homme) that poetic inspiration is "an altogether rare piece of luck, a momentary gift from heaven which it was the poet's responsibility to be in a state to receive by means of an absolute purity, and by paying with his misery for the fortuitous benefit of this manna".

== Selected bibliography ==
- Simulacre : poèmes et lithographies (1925). Illustrations by André Masson.
- Le Point cardinal (1927). Cardinal Point, trans. Terry Hale in Aurora / Cardinal Point (Atlas Press, 2013)
- Aurora (written 1927–28; published 1946). Aurora, trans. Anna Warby (Atlas Press, 1990; 2013)
- L’Afrique fantôme (1934). Phantom Africa, trans. Brent Hayes Edwards (Seagull Books, 2018)
- Miroir de la tauromachie (1938). Mirror of Tauromachy, trans. Paul Hammond (Atlas Press, 2007)
- L’Âge d’homme (1939). Manhood, trans. Richard Howard (Cape, 1968; North Point Press, 1984; University of Chicago Press, 1992). Includes the 1945 essay "De la littérature considérée comme une tauromachie" ("The Autobiographer as Torero").
- Haut Mal (1943). Reprinted as Haut Mal, suivi de Autres lancers (1969).
- La Langue secrète des Dogons de Saga (1948)
- La Règle du jeu (1948–1976). Rules of the Game:
  - Vol. 1: Biffures (1948). Scratches, trans. Lydia Davis (Paragon House, 1991)
  - Vol. 2: Fourbis (1955). Scraps, trans. Lydia Davis (Johns Hopkins University Press, 1997)
  - Vol. 3: Fibrilles (1966). Fibrils, trans. Lydia Davis (Yale University Press, 2017)
  - Vol. 4: Frêle Bruit (1976). Frail Riffs, trans. Richard Sieburth (Yale University Press, 2024)
- Race et civilisation (1951). Race and Culture, trans. unknown (UNESCO, 1958)
- La Possession et ses aspects théatraux chez les Éthiopiens du Gondar (1958)
- Nuits sans nuit et quelques jours sans jour (1961). Nights as Day, Days as Night, trans. Richard Sieburth (Eridanos Press, 1987; Spurl Editions, 2017)
- Brisées (1966). Broken Branches, trans. Lydia Davis (North Point Press, 1989)
- Afrique noire : la création plastique, with Jacqueline Delange (1967). African Art, trans. Michael Ross (Golden Press, 1968)
- Mots sans Mémoire (1969). Collection that includes Simulacre, Le Point cardinal, Glossaire j'y serre mes gloses, Bagatelles végétales, and Marrons sculptés pour Miró.
- Au verso des images (1980)
- Le Ruban au cou d'Olympia (1981). The Ribbon at Olympia's Throat, trans. Christine Pichini (Semiotext(e), 2019)
- Francis Bacon face et profil (1983). Francis Bacon: Full Face and in Profile, trans. John Weightman (Phaidon, 1983)
- Operratiques (1992). Operratiques, trans. Guy Bennett (Green Integer, 2001)
- Journal 1922-1989 (1992)

== See also ==
- Limit-experience

== Sources ==
- Jean-Louis de Rambures, "Comment travaillent les écrivains", Paris 1978 (interview with M. Leiris, in French)
