= Pierre Unik =

French poet and journalist

- Born: 5 January 1909; Paris, France
- Disappeared: 27 February 1945 (aged 36); Pomezní Boudy, Silesia, Czechoslovakia
- Occupations: Poet, screenwriter, journalist

Pierre Unik (5 January 1909 – 27 February 1945) was a French surrealist poet, screenwriter and journalist.

== Surrealism ==
Unik published his first Surrealist text in the sixth issue of La Révolution surréaliste. He participated in ten of the twelve known surrealist sex investigations, and claimed to have lost his virginity in a brothel, between the ages of fifteen and sixteen.

== Disappearance ==
Unik was captured in a prisoner of war camp in Silesia in 1940. Escaping in 1945, he never made it back to France, disappearing in Slovakia.

== See also ==
- List of kidnappings (1940–1949)
- List of people who disappeared
