= La Alberca =

- Municipality
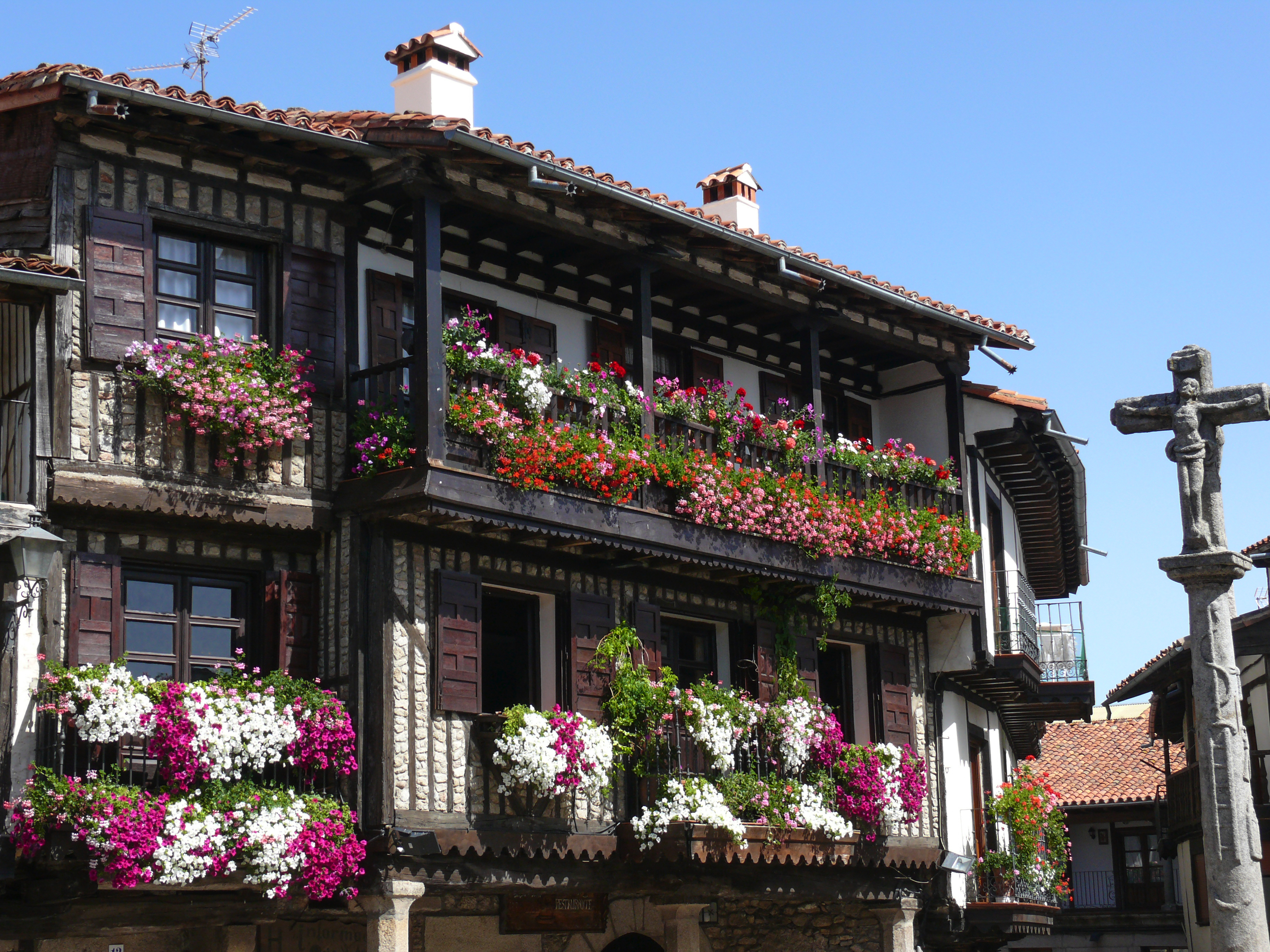

- Flag Coat of arms

- Location in Salamanca Location in Castile and León Location in Spain
- Coordinates: 40°29′21″N 6°6′40″W
- Country: Spain
- Autonomous community: Castile and León
- Province: Salamanca
- Comarca: Sierra de Francia Comarca

Government
  - Mayor: Miguel Ángel Luengo Becerro (PSOE)

Area
  - Total: 61 km^{2} (24 sq mi)
- Elevation: 1,048 m (3,438 ft)

Population (2025-01-01)
  - Total: 1,034
  - Density: 17/km^{2} (44/sq mi)
- Time zone: UTC+1 (CET)
  - Summer (DST): UTC+2 (CEST)
- Postal code: 37624

Spanish Cultural Heritage
- Type: Non-movable
- Criteria: Historic ensemble
- Designated: 6 September 1940
- Reference no.: RI-53-0000005

La Alberca is a municipality in the province of Salamanca in the autonomous community of Castilla y León, Spain. It is the capital of Sierra de Francia Comarca.

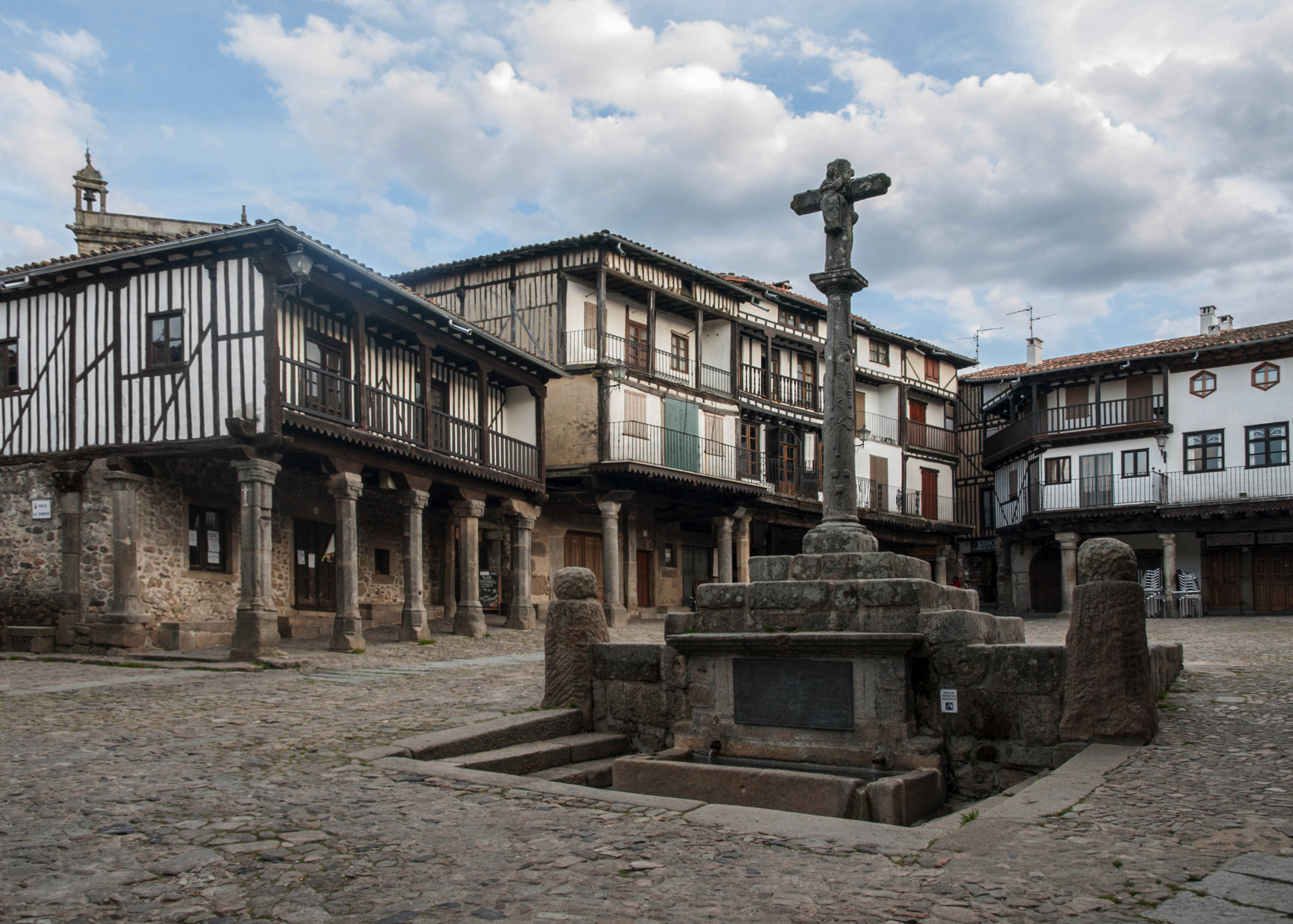
The Main Square

In 2003, the population of La Alberca was 1105, and the area 60.73 km^{2} (23.45 sq mi). Its altitude is 1,048 metres (3,438 ft) above sea level.

The Carmelite convent of Batuecas Desert, established by Thomas á Jesu is located five kilometres away, but the route there from the town is 12 km.

== Etymology ==
Due to the relatively long presence of the Arab civilization in the region, the name, La Alberca may have come from the Arabic word "berka" meaning a lake, combined with the Arabic article "al". (Disputed)

== History ==
People have been living in the area of La Alberca since before the arrival of the Romans, as evinced by the pre-Roman castro which sits beneath a part of town. Few remnants from the [Visigoth] era remain, however it is thought that materials were reused to build the present Majadas Old Chapel.

In the 13th century the town of La Alberca was a clerk of the crown, being one of the few places in the Sierra de France that belonged to Miranda County.

According to legend, in 1465 the women of the town defeated Portuguese troops, and, in this victory, claimed the Portuguese flag, which is still preserved today in the village. The victory is celebrated on the second day of Easter.

In the 15th century, John II of Castile brought the town under the domain of the House of Alba who later gained control of part of the Sierra de France with the help of Ferdinand. These demains were grouped under one jurisdiction based in the town of Granadilla, Caceres.

It was written of La Alberca in around 1600: "It has only a parish church and a chapel near the village of San Sebastian and two chapels, one of Our Lady of Majadas Old and one from San Pedro and two shrines .... "

However La Alberca managed to maintain some autonomy from Granadilla, coming to have their own ordinances in 1515.

In 1940 the town became a National Historic Landmark, facilitating urban conservation. Since 2000, the Valley of Las Batuecas in La Alberca has been a declared Historic Site. The valley is where the Batuecas River joins the River Ladrillar.

== Parish church ==
The Parish Church of Our Lady of the Assumption dates from the 18th century. It was completed in the same year as the New Cathedral of Salamanca (in 1733). It has a notable pulpit of polychrome granite from the 16th century and is renowned for the Blessed Christ of the Sweat.

The church tower was built about 212 years before the present church, paid for by the first Duke of Alba, with his coat of arms visible in a corner of the Tower. It was recorded in 1693 that there was a clock and bells in the tower. The chronicles state that "in 1520 the campaign to construct the set of bells was completed by collecting the albercanos rings, silver jewelry and smelt..."

== Other religious sites ==
In the Natural Park of Las Batuecas are multiple sacred places of worship as well as prehistoric caves. Since 1599 the Carmelite monastery has become a major spiritual centre. Within the sanctuary are scattered 18 hermitages, some of which can be visited and some which are in ruins.

The Shrine of Our Lady of Old Majadas is out towards Mogarraz, about 3 km (1.9 mi) into a forest of chestnut and oak, hidden and almost mystical. The Virgin has a Romanesque style of the 12th century, beautiful in its simplicity, as does its Romanesque chapel with a granite exterior pulpit. It has its own procession in the town.

The Hermitage of San Marcos, now in ruins, was near the shrine, with an outlook over the Rock of France, the Egg Rock, the Gap of the Cross, La Alberca and the River France. Construction began in 1703, but was too far from the town to be maintained. Its grandeur is still perceivable.

The Hermitage of Cristo del Humilladero (the Humiliated Christ) is the oldest in the town and is located within the village. It is positioned at the main entrance to the town on what was once the route from Salamanca. The Cristo Humilladero is taken out in procession on Holy Thursday of Semana Santa.

The Hermitage of San Blas right side toward the Batuecas . Formerly known as the Martyrs of Los Santos, until not long ago was the village cemetery. Worship is no longer performed there, however for locals it is particularly important for the pilgrimage of "The Flag Day". They carry the banner that was grabbed by the townswomen in fighting against the Portuguese in 1475, which has been celebrated since that day with wine at the expense of the Duke of Alba. Today is paid by the municipality of La Alberca.

The Shrine of San Antonio is at the entry from Salamanca and there is a procession and mass on his feast day.

The Sanctuary of the Virgin of the Peña de Francia, El Cabaco, is a Marian shrine at the summit; an altitude of 1,723 metres (5,653 ft). It was built by Dominican friars in the 15th century. The Virgin was discovered in the 15th century by Frenchman named Simon Vela.

The Convent of The Zarzoso Porta Coeli, The Cabaco is a contemplative convent. It was founded by Franciscan nuns in the 15th century.

The Dominican fathers built a "lower house" in El Maíllo, a village near the base of the Peña de Francia, so as to be able to maintain the practices of the Virgin through the winter months. This great monastery of the late 15th century is now in ruins.

Finally, the Convento de Gracia (Convent of Thanks) in San Martín del Castañar, a town near La Alberca, was founded in 1430 by the Franciscan Fathers and had great importance and influence on the environment for centuries. It is now in ruins surrounded by lush oak forest.

== Culture ==
Coat of arms of La Alberca

The population of La Alberca is highly traditional. The town has been defined by its religious expression and rites for birth, death and all aspects of life. The visual manifestations of these rituals have been forged over the centuries, and can be seen in both the culture and architecture of the town. In the streets of La Alberca it is possible to see religious manifestations in stone.

The village also has ancient Tapas Bars which still retain their medieval, dark interiors and where ancient Spanish bar customs are still in vogue. Tapas like Jamon, Chorizo and Salami can be eaten at these bars and a custom involving the drinking of red water can be indulged in.

== Events ==
On August 15, the fiesta in honour of Our Lady of the Assumption is held, full of baroque splendour and colourful costumes and traditional folklore. The next day represents the loa, a popular comedy mixing religious and secular elements. These parties are declared of National Tourist Interest.

On September 8, the festival is held at the Peña de Francia and the pilgrimage to Old Majadas is celebrated the Saturday before Pentecost.

In La Alberca there is a tradition of having a pig loose in the streets that is fed by the neighbours. The pig, named "San Anton", is blessed on June 13, and released onto the town's streets. On January 17, the feast day of San Antonio (Saint Anthony), the pig is raffled off at the doors of the church. The funds are raised for the Brothers of St Antony. This tradition features prominently in the episode entitled 'Pig' of TV show Omnivore.

In November he has taken up the Calbochada, this is to roast chestnuts in the town square while displaying the folklore of the area.

On February 2, we celebrate the feast of the candles with a procession of the Virgin of the Assumption.

== Legends ==
- The Virgin of Maralviejas or Old Majadas, was found among rocks by a hermit named Froilan.
- Tradition states that on September 1, 1655, a statue of Christ (El Cristo del Sudor), sweated blood and the following day bled from the wound in his side.

== See also ==
- List of municipalities in Salamanca
- English Village
