= Documents (magazine) =

French surrealist art magazine (1929–1930)

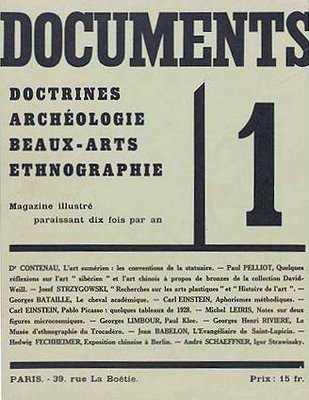
Cover of Documents No 1, 1929

Documents was a Surrealist art magazine edited by Georges Bataille. Published in Paris from 1929 through 1930, it ran for 15 issues, each of which contained a wide range of original writing and photographs.

Documents was financed by Georges Wildenstein, an influential Parisian art dealer and sponsor of the Surrealists. Given its title and focus, the magazine initially listed an eleven-member editorial board including Wildenstein himself (with Bataille listed as "general secretary"); however, by the fifth issue, Bataille was the only editorial member to remain on the masthead.

Called "a war machine against received ideas" by Bataille, Documents brought together a wide range of contributors, ranging from dissident surrealists including Michel Leiris, André Masson, and Joan Miró, to Bataille's numismatist colleagues at the National Library's Cabinet of Coins and Medals. The publication's content was even more wide-ranging, juxtaposing essays on jazz and archaeology with a photographic series fetishizing the big toe, an entire issue dedicated to Picasso, and paeans to the "ominous grandeur" of the slaughterhouses photographed by Eli Lotar. A regular section of the magazine called the "Critical Dictionary" offered short essays on such subjects as "Absolute," "Eye," "Factory Chimney," and "Keaton (Buster)."

Documents was a direct challenge to "mainstream" Surrealism as championed by André Breton, who in his Second Surrealist Manifesto of 1929 derided Bataille as "(professing) to wish only to consider in the world that which is vilest, most discouraging, and most corrupted." The violent juxtapositions of pictures and text in Documents were intended to provide a darker and more primal alternative to what Bataille viewed as Breton's disingenuous and weak brand of Surrealist art. By presenting explicit, often profane imagery side by side with "intellectual" writing, Bataille used Documents to propel Surrealism in a direction he felt Breton dared not: toward an overturning of all hierarchies of art and morality, and a complete democracy of form.

== See also ==
- Acéphale, a surrealist review created by Bataille, published from 1936 to 1939
- Minotaure, a primarily surrealist-oriented publication founded by Albert Skira, published in Paris from 1933 to 1939
- La Révolution surréaliste, a Surrealist publication founded by Breton, published in Paris from 1924 to 1929
- View, an American art magazine, primarily covering avant-garde and surrealist art, published from 1940 to 1947
- VVV, a New York City magazine published by émigré European surrealists from 1942 through 1944
