= Loplop =

Alter ego of Max Ernst

Max Ernst. Loplop Introduces Loplop. 1930. Oil and various materials on wood. 100 x 180 cm. The Menil Collection, Houston, Texas

Loplop, or more formally, Loplop, Father Superior of the Birds, is the name of a birdlike character that was an alter ego of the Dada-Surrealist artist Max Ernst. Ernst had an ongoing fascination with birds, which often appear in his work. Loplop functioned as a familiar animal. William Rubin wrote of Ernst "Among his more successful works of the thirties are a series begun in 1930 around the theme of his alter ego, Loplop, Superior of the Birds." Loplop is an iconic image of surrealist art, the painting Loplop Introduces Loplop (1930) appears on the front cover of the Gaëtan Picon's book Surrealist and Surrealism 1919-1939, and the drawing and collage Loplop Presents (1932) was used as the frontispiece of Patrick Waldberg's book Surrealism.

== The series ==
Loplop first appeared in Ernst's collage novels La Femme 100 Têtes and Une Semaine de Bonté in the role of a narrator and commentator, followed by a number of works into the mid 1930s, forming an informal series of collages, paintings, and mixed media works.

Loplop's image was not a fixed character, but highly variable in appearance and seldom depicted in the same way twice. Typically (but not always), Loplop had the head of a bird, which could be highly abstracted, often a bird with a crest, comb, or wattle. The body was a square or rectangular space (a canvas, frame, easel, or wall), with the arms and legs being zoomorphic or geometric abstraction in form. Within the "body", an image, a piece of Max Ernst's art is presented (a collage, frottage, painting, etc.) which could be equal to, or function independently from the rest of the work. See external links below, The Menil Collection, Houston, Texas: 3 Loplop drawings, for some typical examples.

The German art historian Uwe M. Schneede offered his view —

By letting his pictures be presented through an intermediary — his art figure — rather than by himself, Ernst has changed his role, or, better still, he is showing more clearly where he stands in relation to his work. The artist-and-model iconography is adopted and, at the same time, twisted. The artist appears as his own exhibitor and intermediary: he shows his products and thus demonstrates their availability. This seems to indicate a basic change in Ernst relation toward his artistic activity — a kind of coming into the clear. At forty, he seems to have freed himself from the need to pictorialize oppressive childhood experiences and also from the rules of Surrealism, to the point where he can —with sovereign ease — make his liberating creative work (and thus the creative process itself) his main theme.

Samantha Kavky stated in the abstract of her journal article Authorship and Identity in Max Ernst's Loplop —

I suggest that Ernst models Loplop on the father/totem, as defined by Sigmund Freud in his Totem and Taboo of 1913. An exploration of Ernst's interpretation of Freudian theory in creating Loplop illuminates the character's surprising complexity and centrality to Ernst's oeuvre. As a totem, Loplop emerges from a primary oedipal conflict on which Ernst structures his artistic identity and practice. Equating traditional notions of creative authorship with various forms of patriarchal authority, Ernst's constructed totem signifies his personal, aesthetic and political rejection of individual mastery in favour of his fraternal allegiance to the surrealist group and his embrace of surrealist automatist practices.

Ernst was familiar with Freud's writing and titled one of his later paintings Totem and Taboo (1941, private collection).

=== Partial list of works ===
- Loplop Introducing a Bird (1929/1957), plaster, oil, and wood, 102.2 × 123.2 cm., Museum of Contemporary Art Chicago, Chicago
- Loplop Introduces Loplop (1930). oil and mixed media on wood,100 x 180 cm. Menil Collection, Houston
- Loplop Introduces a Young Girl (1930), oil and mixed media on wood, 175 x 89 cm. Musée National d'Art Moderne, Paris
- Anthropomorphic Figure and Shell Flowers: Loplop Introduces a Flower (c. 1930), oil and collage on wood, 99 x 81 cm., private collection
- Loplop Presents (1930), graphite frottage on paper, 29.8 × 21.6 cm., Menil Collection, Houston
- Loplop Introduces the Members of the Surrealist Groupe (1931), collage, photographs, frottage, and pencil on paper, 50.2 x 33.7 cm. The Museum of Modern Art, New York
- Loplop Presents Grapes (1931), graphite on paper with gouache mounted on paperboard, 64.8 × 49.5 cm., Menil Collection, Houston
- Loplop Presents la Marseillaise (1931), graphite frottage on paper mounted on paper, 31.1 × 22.9 cm., Menil Collection, Houston
- Facility: Loplop Introduces (1931), collage and pencil on paper, 65 x50 cm., formerly Roland Penrose collection, London
- Loplop Introduces (1932), collage and frottage with drawing, gouache, printed marble paper, paint, and crayon on paper, 50 x 64.5 cm., Art Institute of Chicago, Chicago
- Loplop Presents (1932), collage, botanical lithograph, graphite on pape 63.4 × 49.6 cm., Art Institute of Chicago, Chicago

== Publications ==
- Spies, Werner (1998), Max Ernst, Loplop. DuMont Reiseverlag, Ostfildern. ISBN 3770145526 (German language)
- Kavky, Samantha (2005). Authorship and Identity in Max Ernst's Loplop. Art History, 28 (3): 357-385 pp.

== Legacy ==
- Rikki Ducornet's novel Phosphor in Dreamland (1995) partially concerns the plight of the "lôplôp" bird, endemic to the fictionalized Caribbean island of Birdland. Perhaps deliberately to keep with the variability of Ernst's loplop, Ducornet never describes the lôplôp in detail but instead emphasizes its shape-shifting capabilities, usually into that of a woman with animal body parts.
