= Little Machine Constructed by Minimax Dadamax in Person =

Mixed-media artwork by Max Ernst

- Artist: Max Ernst
- Year: 1919–20
- Type: Mixed media
- Dimensions: 49.4 cm × 31.5 cm (19.45 in × 12.4 in)
- Location: Peggy Guggenheim Collection, Venice, Italy

Little Machine Constructed by Minimax Dadamax in Person (Von minimax dadamax selbst konstruiertes maschinchen) (1919–20) is a mixed-media work of art by the German dadaist and surrealist Max Ernst.

It is probably the most famous example of a series of Ernst's works that were based on diagrams of scientific instruments. The work began by creating print reproductions of these diagrams. They were then colored and textured with a combination of watercolor, gouache and pencil and ink frottage. Frottage is a technique created by Ernst that involves creating rubbings of different textured surfaces like wood and textiles to give the work a three-dimensional appearance.

The work also displays Ernst's interest in typography. Many of the shapes in the machine can be seen as letters. At the bottom is an inscription that reads "Little machine constructed by Minimax Dadamax in person for fearless pollination of female suckers at the beginning of the change of life and for other such fearless functions."

== Sources ==
- Max Ernst, Little Machine Constructed by Minimax Dadamax in Person
