= Giovanni Guida =

Italian painter

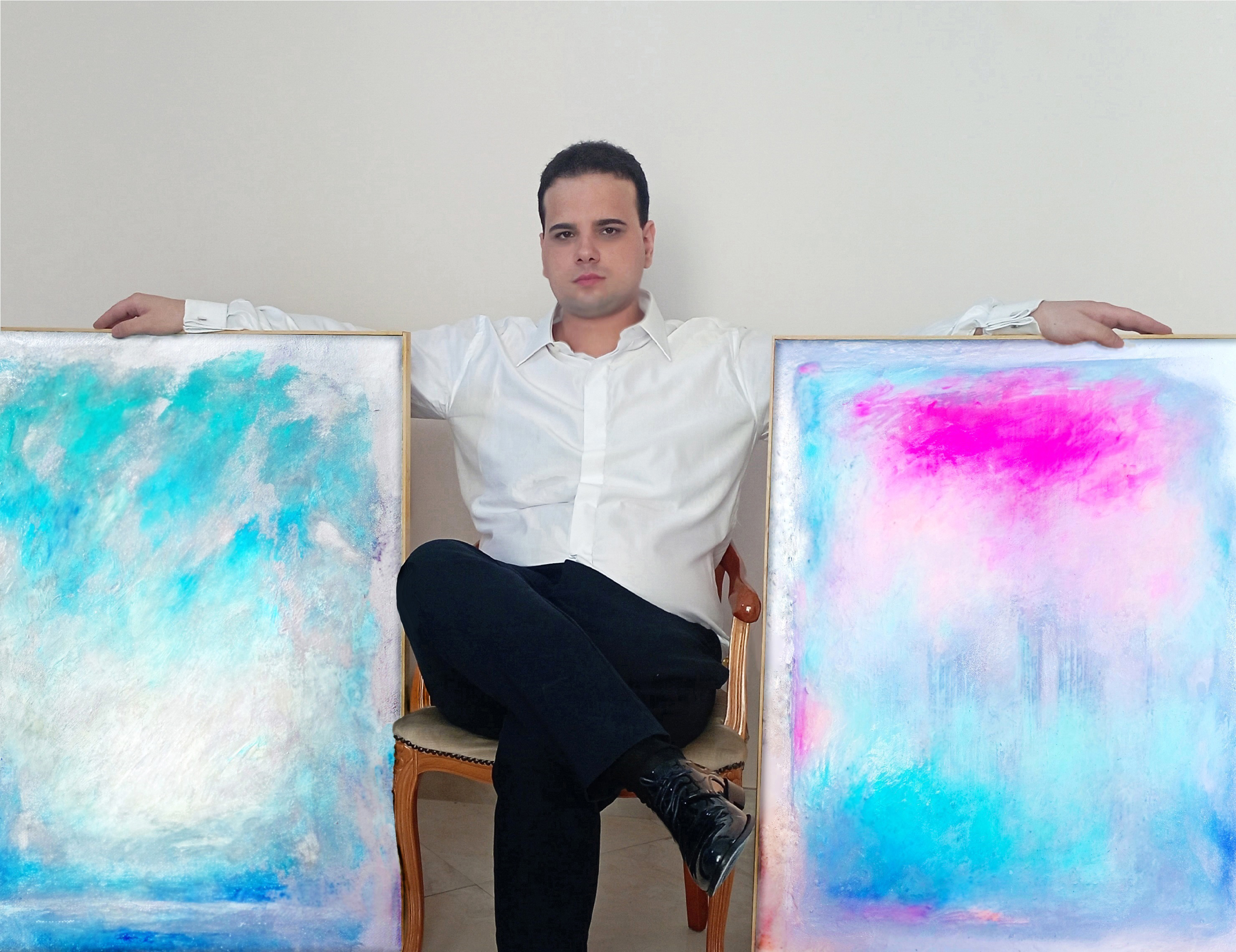
- Guida in 2023
- Born: Giovanni Guida; 1992 (age 33–34); Acerra, Italy
- Known for: Grattage

Giovanni Guida (born 12 October 1992) is an Italian painter, known for his contemporary approach to the surrealist techniques of grattage and frottage.

== Biography ==
Born in Acerra, Italy in 1992 and raised in Cesa (province of Caserta), Guida studied at the "Luca Giordano" art high school in Aversa and subsequently obtained his bachelor's and master's degrees in painting from the Academy of Fine Arts in Naples.

Following his studies, he taught painting and art history in Rome.

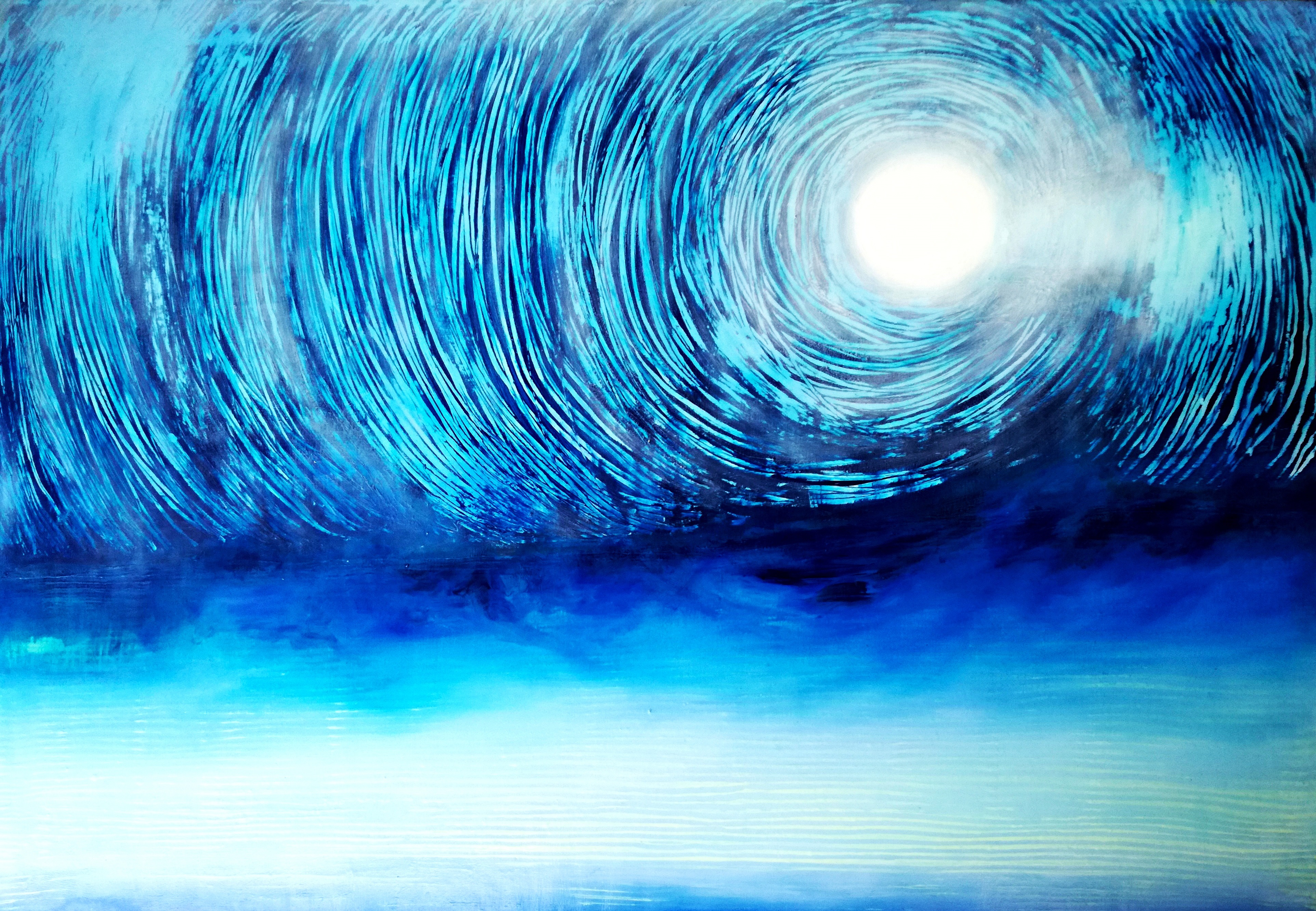
Apotheosis, grattage - oil on canvas by Giovanni Guida, 2014.

In 2016–2017, his icon Caesarius Diaconus (Caesarius of Terracina) was exhibited in museums and cathedrals around the world including Kunstgewerbemuseum of Berlin, Museu Frederic Marès in Barcelona; Terra Sancta Museum Jerusalem; Lisbon's Museu de São Roque; Cathedral of Manila (by Cardinal Luis Antonio Gokim Tagle, Pro-Prefect of the Dicastery for Evangelization); Essen Minster; and Glastonbury Abbey.

== Works ==
Style and technique

His paintings are distinguished by the depth of lapis lazuli blue, silver and gold.

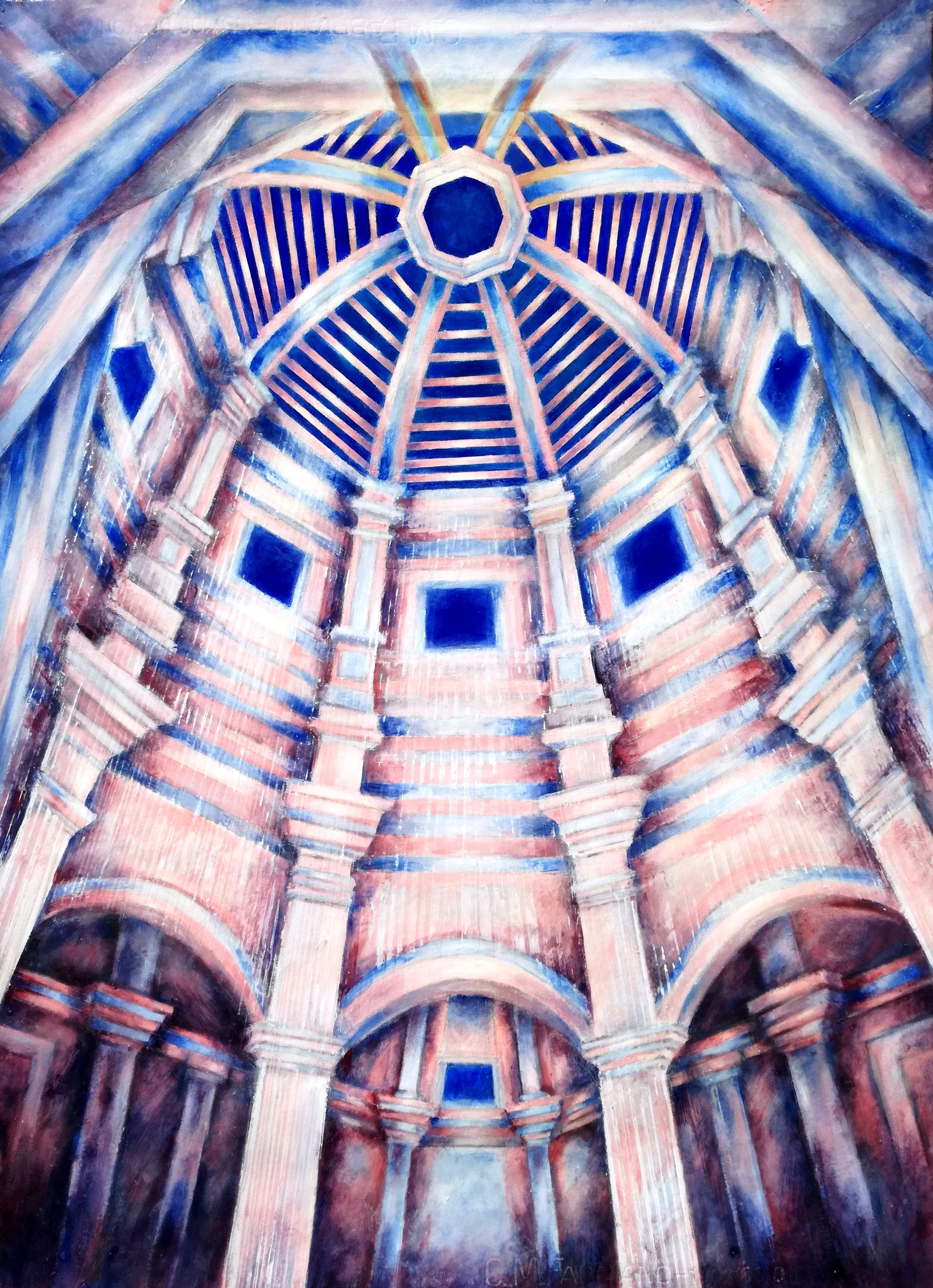
Etherea, oil on canvas by Giovanni Guida, 2021

He works particularly with grattage, a technique that involves scraping wet paint from the surface, and frottage. To create these effects, Guida experiments with a variety of tools, including sponges, styluses, scalpels, steel brushes, and small metal blocks. His grattage technique involves the progressive sealing of successive pictorial layers with specific resins, in order to preserve their chromatic brilliance.

Notable works include: Apotheosis (2014); God fights the Coronavirus (And you'll be cured of all diseases.. and I'll take care of you), created during the COVID-19 pandemic; Etherea (2021), Take Me to Church (2022) and Apotheosis of Dante Alighieri in Florence: Amor che move il sole e l’altre stelle (2020), to commemorate the 700th anniversary of Dante's death.
