= Forest and Dove =

Painting by Max Ernst

- Artist: Max Ernst
- Year: 1927
- Medium: Oil on canvas
- Dimensions: 100 cm × 82 cm (39.4 in × 32.3 in)
- Location: Tate Gallery; London

Forest and Dove (1927) is a painting by the German surrealist Max Ernst. It depicts a nocturnal scene of a forest of bizarre, abstract trees. In the thick of the forest is a childlike depiction of a dove.

Both the forest and dove themes have appeared several times in Ernst's works. According to an analysis by the Tate Gallery in London the forest image represents the forest near Ernst's childhood home which inspired a sense of ‘enchantment and terror’ in the artist. The same analysis also states that the dove represents Ernst himself.

The painting has a heavily textured and three-dimensional appearance. This is owed to a technique called grattage. Grattage was invented by Ernst and the Spanish surrealist Joan Miró. This technique involves scraping the paint across the canvas so that the paint takes on the imprints of objects placed beneath the canvas.
