= The Tales of Robin Hood =

Defunct visitor attraction in Nottingham, England

Coordinates: 52.9518°N 1.1531°W

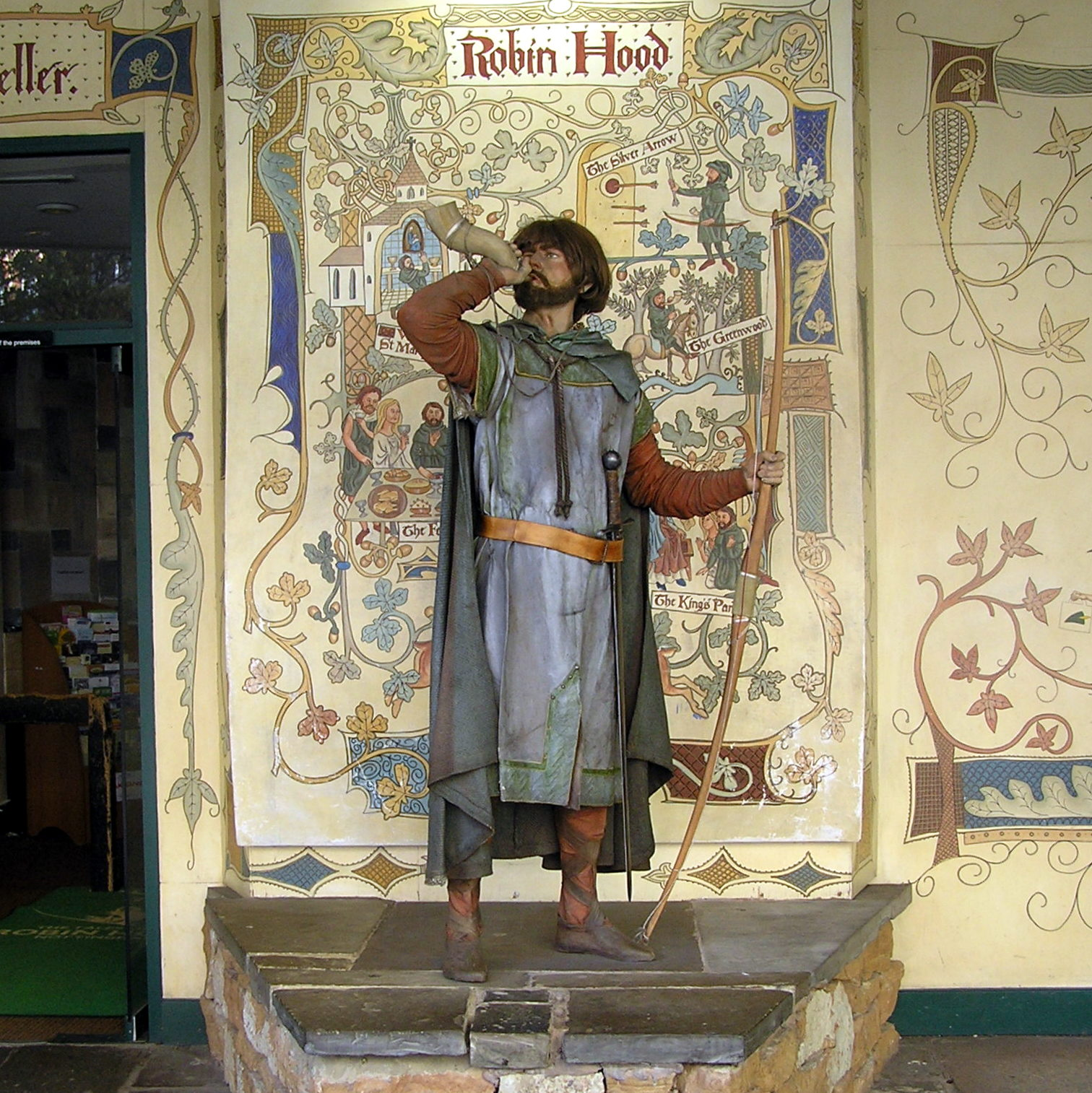
The mannequin of Robin at the attraction entrance

The Tales of Robin Hood was from 1989 to 2009 an indoor visitor attraction and medieval banqueting centre based on the Nottinghamshire legend of Robin Hood. The centre was located on Maid Marian Way in Nottingham city centre, in the vicinity of Nottingham Castle, and brought an estimated £2 million in tourism revenue to the city each year.

Visitors were taken on a chair-lift ride through a recreation of medieval Nottingham with its sights, sounds and smells in addition to Robin Hood's hideout in medieval Sherwood Forest.

Archery and brass rubbing were also on offer and a cinema show investigated the legend of Robin Hood. The centre's 'Great Hall' offered medieval banquets through the year.

The attraction was forced to close in January 2009, after 20 years of business, due to difficulties with rent payments to its landlord, Tesco.
