= Napoleon in the Wilderness =

1941 painting by Max Ernst

- Artist: Max Ernst
- Year: 1941
- Medium: Oil on canvas
- Dimensions: 46.3 cm × 38.1 cm (18.2 in × 15.0 in)
- Location: Museum of Modern Art, New York City

Napoleon in the Wilderness is a 1941 surrealist painting by Max Ernst in the collection of the Museum of Modern Art in New York City. The figure in the foreground is Ernst's partner at that time, the surrealist painter Leonora Carrington.
