= Grattage =

Surrealist painting technique

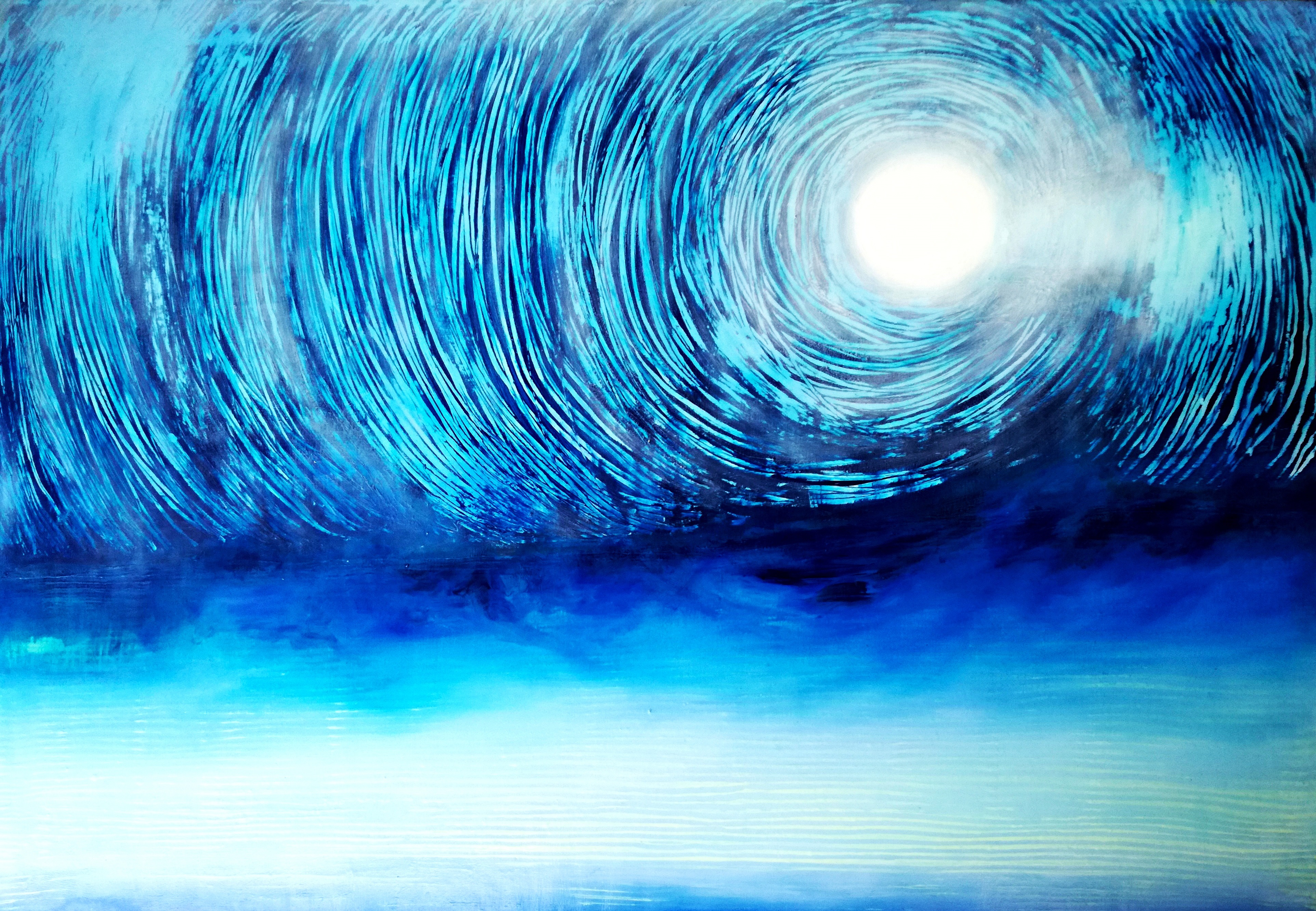
Grattage, Apotheosis, Giovanni Guida, 2014

Grattage (literally "scratching", "scraping") is a technique in surrealist painting which consists of "scratching" fresh paint with a sharp blade.

In this technique, one typically attempts to scratch and remove the chromatic pigment spread on a prepared support (the canvas or other material) in order to move the surface and make it dynamic. Incorporate the technique of grattage in the painting in order to create a strong sense of texture or pattern on the surface of the picture plane.

This technique was used by Max Ernst, Joan Miró, and later by informal artists.

== Technique and materials ==
In this pictorial technique, in addition to the use of brushes and spatulas, the artist experiments with common tools and everyday objects, such as sponges, steel brushes, stilettos, scalpels, tips, razor blades, and small blocks of metal.

In grattage various common tools scrape wet paint to simulate natural patterns or to create new ones. The scratches created bring out the colors of the underlying pictorial layers and create chromatic contrasts. In the grattages, the scraping of the surface layers of paint over an assortment of objects serves to stimulate the mind to engage itself in the automatic process of “discovering” images lying hidden within its innermost recesses.

== Artists ==
Max Ernst rediscovered the frottage technique (based on the rubbing principle); in 1927 he transposed this drawing technique - generally applied to paper - to oil painting, thus creating the grattage process. Grattage allowed Max Ernst to free the creative forces full of suggestions and evocations, less theoretical and more unconscious and spontaneous.

This technique was refined by the artist Hans Hartung; through this process he reaches the sublimation of his typical pictorial gestures, creating a new sign alphabet relying on pointed tools, suitably modified brushes, and rollers.

The technique remains in use today and is reflected in the work of Giovanni Guida, an Italian painter known for his contemporary interpretation of surrealist methods.

In figurative monochrome neo-grattage MatWay further develops the technique in so-called Engraved Paintings.

== See also ==
- Art movement
- Frottage (art)
- List of art techniques
- Surrealist techniques
- Surrealism
