= Stone rubbing =

Practice of creating an image of surface features of a stone on paper

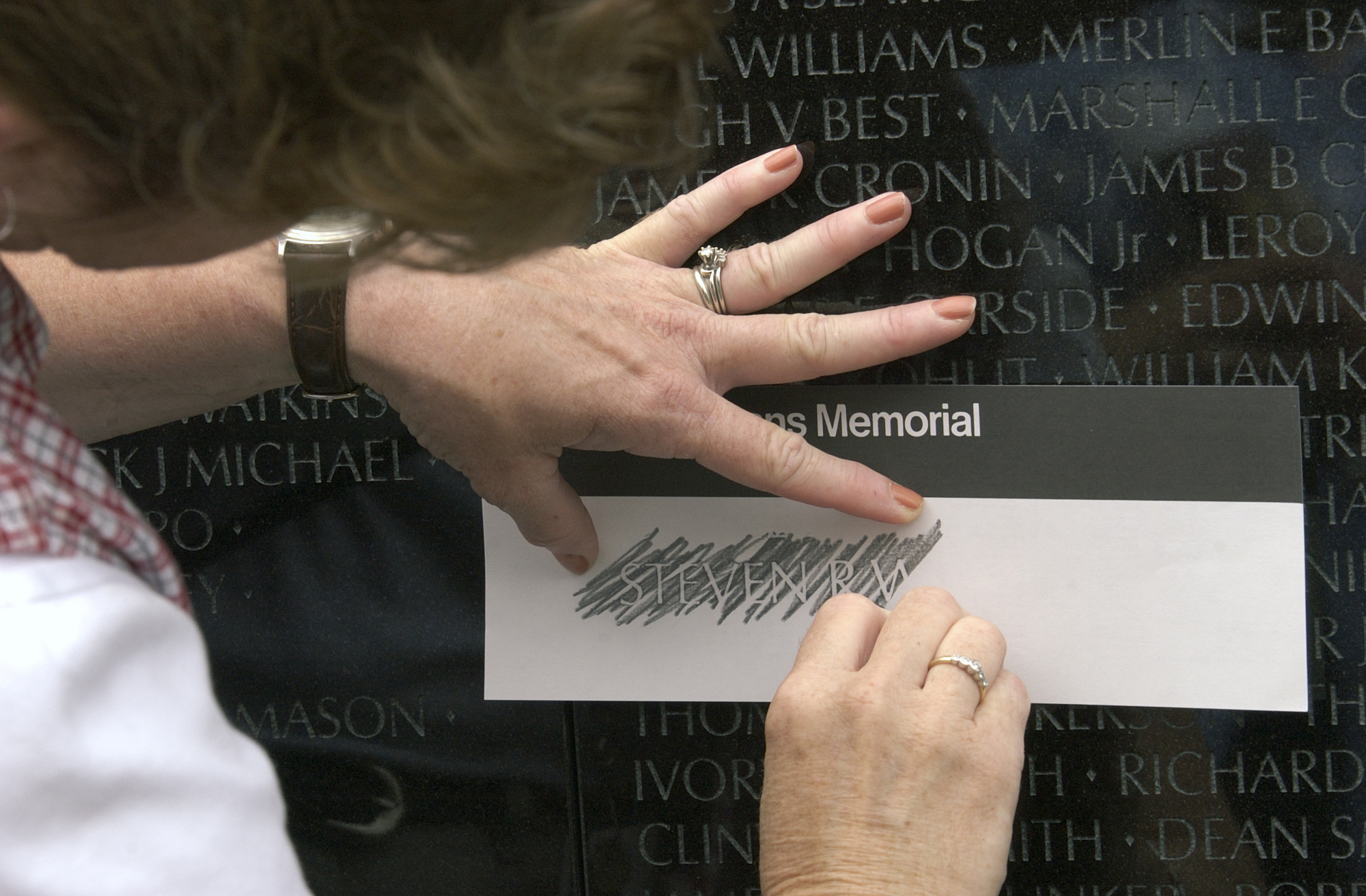
Stone rubbing at the Vietnam Veterans Memorial

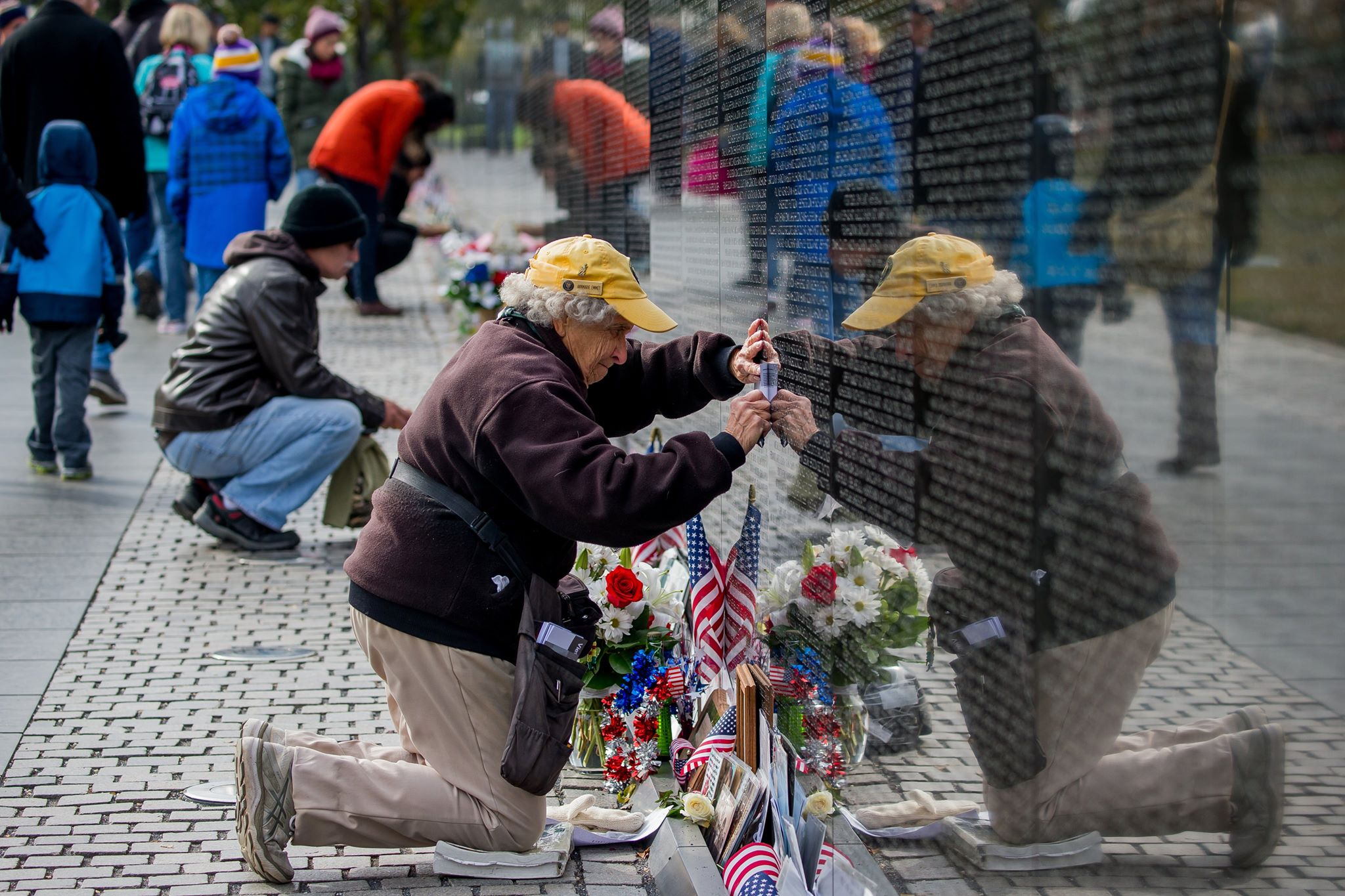
A National Park Service volunteer kneels and uses paper and a graphite stick to create a rubbing of a name from the Vietnam Veterans Memorial.

Stone rubbing is the practice of creating an image of surface features of a stone on paper. The image records features such as natural textures, inscribed patterns or lettering. By rubbing hard rendering materials over the paper, pigment is deposited over protrusions and on edges; depressions remain unpigmented since the pliable paper moves away from the rendering material. Common rendering materials include washi paper, charcoal, wax, graphite or inksticks. Over time, the practice of stone rubbing can cause permanent damage to cultural monuments due to abrasion. For an artist, stone rubbings can become an entire body of creative work that is framed and displayed.

Rubbings are commonly made by visitors to the Vietnam Veterans Memorial. Visitors use pencil and paper to capture the name of a family member or friend who died during the Vietnam War as it appears on the wall. The rubbing forms a type of souvenir.

== Technique ==
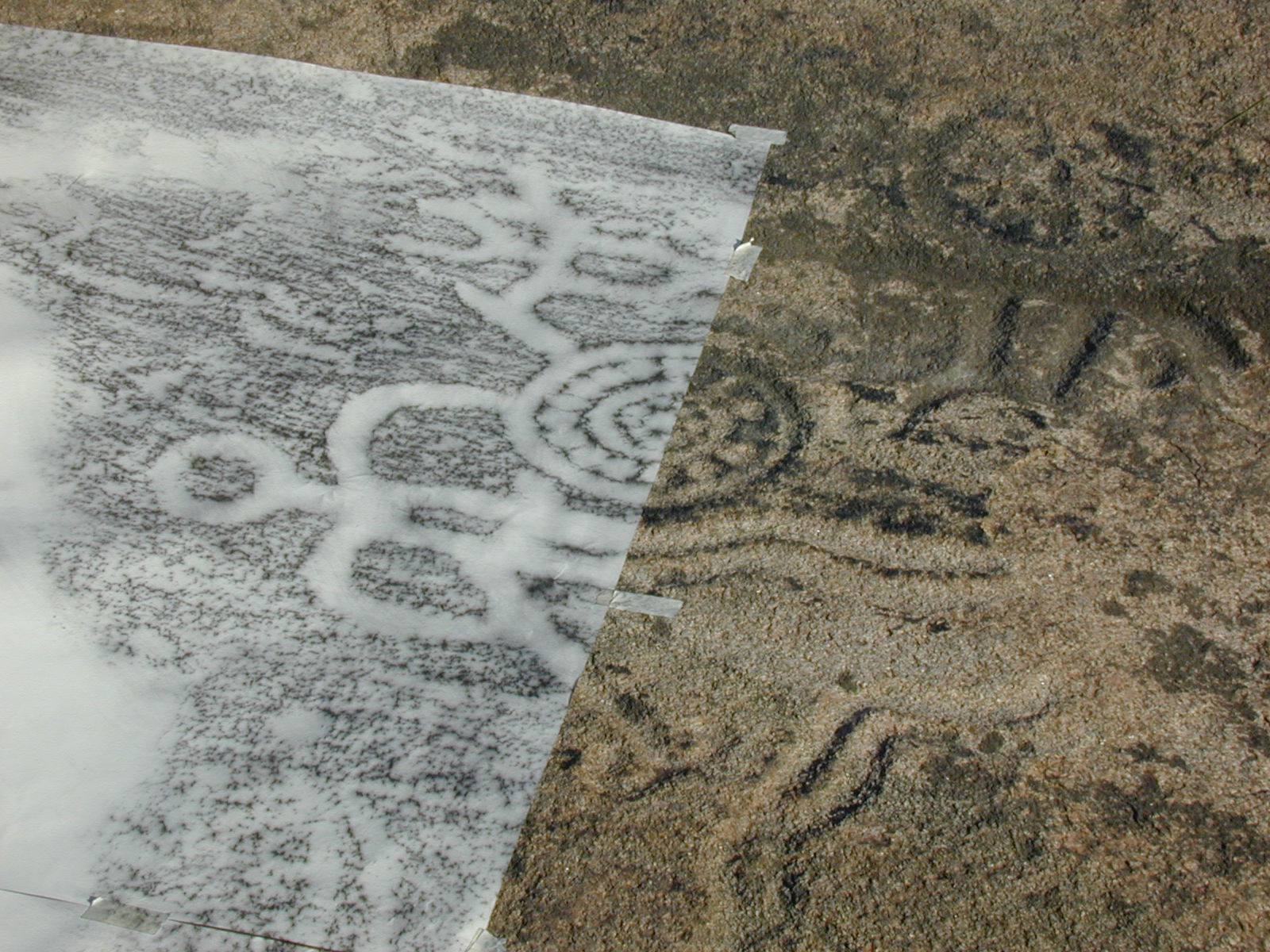
A stone rubbing (graphite on paper) for documentation of a petroglyph

The paper that has been used by Chinese scholars to transfer the calligraphy from stones is made from plant fiber. It can be used in two ways to retrieve the calligraphy. One way requires the paper to be dry and then adhered to the stone through a paste made with water and a starch that is made from rice or wheat. The paper is then tamped into the engravings on the stone. The other technique requires the paper to be wet and tamped into the engravings without a paste.

After doing either of these techniques, an ink, created through grinding an ink stick and adding water one drop at a time to achieve the ideal consistency, is used to retrieve the calligraphy. The ink is stippled on with a cloth filled with the ink. The ink covers the paper without sinking into the engravings. When the paper is peeled off, the calligraphy engravings come out white, while everything else is black from the ink.

More commonly, people use butcher paper to create stone rubbings. The paper is typically taped onto the stone or gravestone with masking or painter's tape, over the desired inscription. Charcoal or crayon is then rubbed across the surface, leaving the engravings untouched. When the paper is removed, the inscription should be readable because the recessed areas were not marked.

It can be helpful to clean the stone beforehand with a soft brush and water. Stiff brushes and cleaning solutions are generally avoided because they can scratch or damage the stone.

When stone rubbing, one should be careful with stones that are deteriorating, as they can collapse under pressure.

== Gravestone rubbing ==
Gravestone rubbing also applies this technique to gravestones, often as a method of retrieving and conserving information about genealogy. For a genealogist, a gravestone rubbing may become a permanent record of death when a gravestone is rapidly deteriorating.

Gravestone rubbing can be used to teach about local history. The stone's condition, art, and inscription can tell what was going on in an area at a specific time. Studying multiple gravestones in one specific area can give even more information about history.

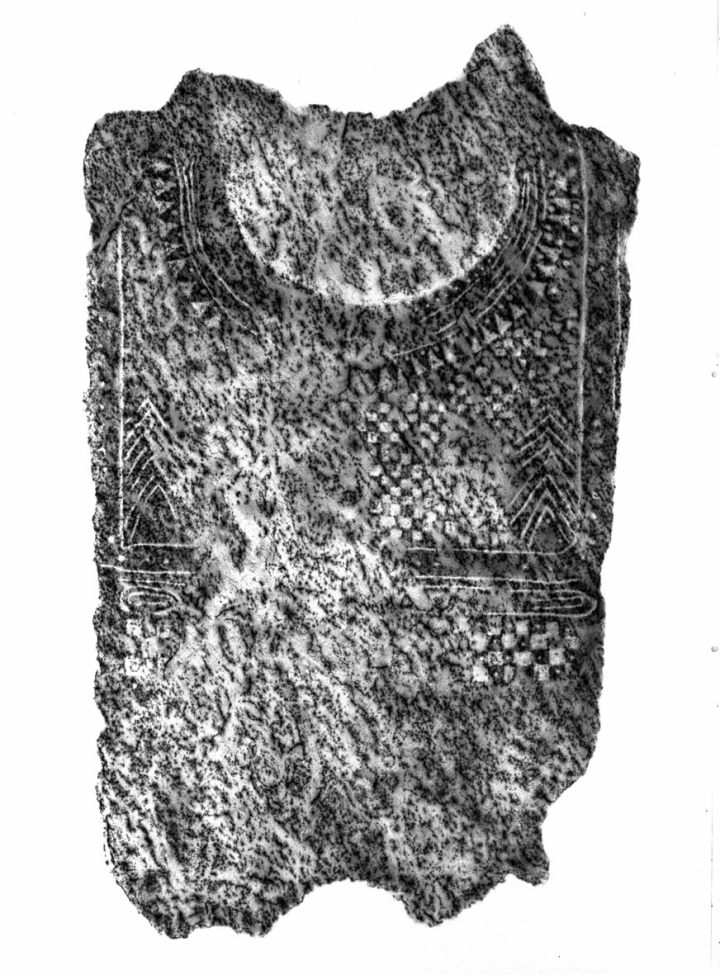
Stone rubbing of anthropomorphic stele no 10, Sion, Petit-Chasseur necropolis, Neolithic

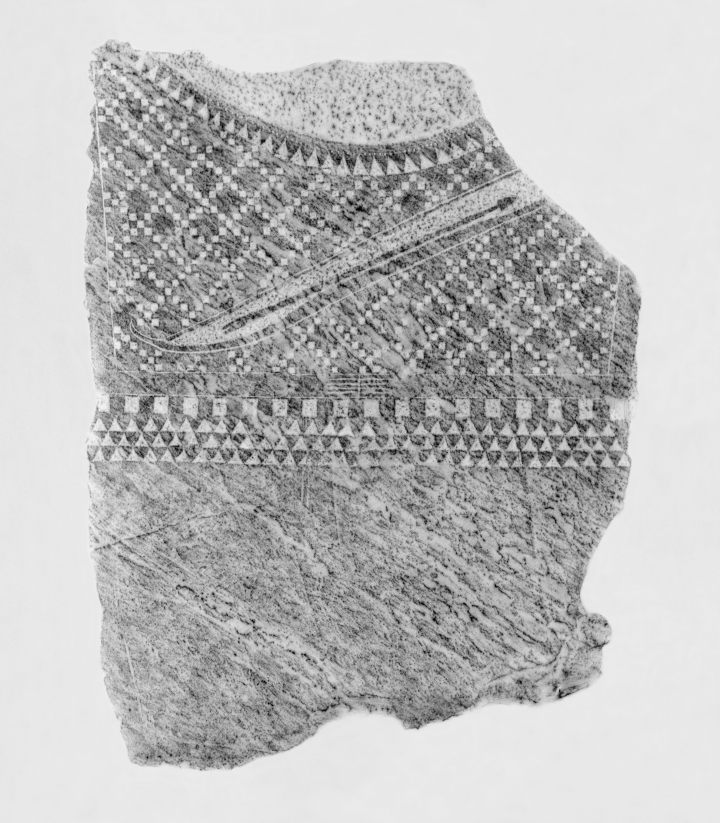
Stone rubbing of anthropomorphic stele no 20, Sion, Petit-Chasseur necropolis, Neolithic

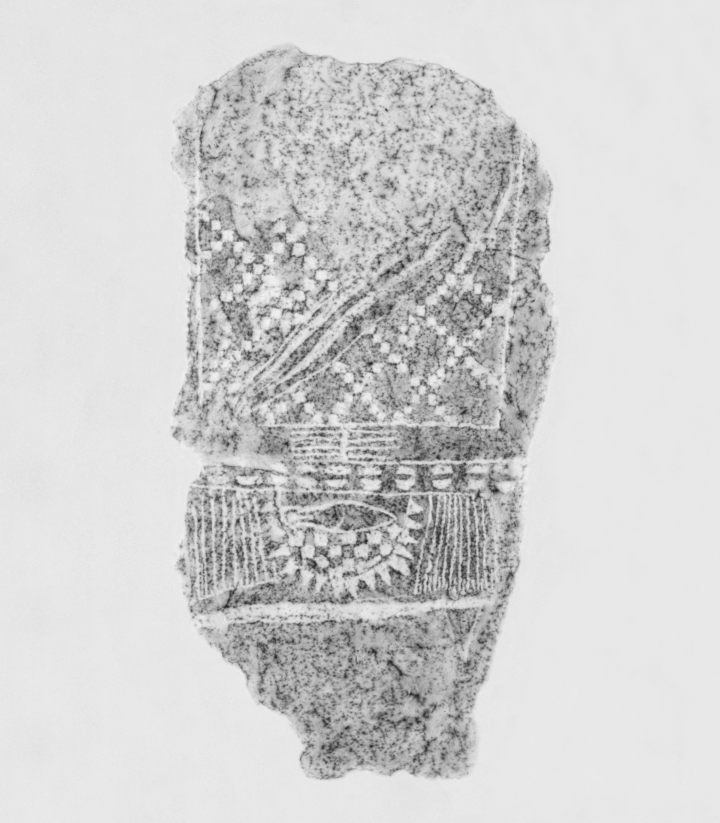
Stone rubbing of anthropomorphic stele no 18, Sion, Petit-Chasseur necropolis, Neolithic

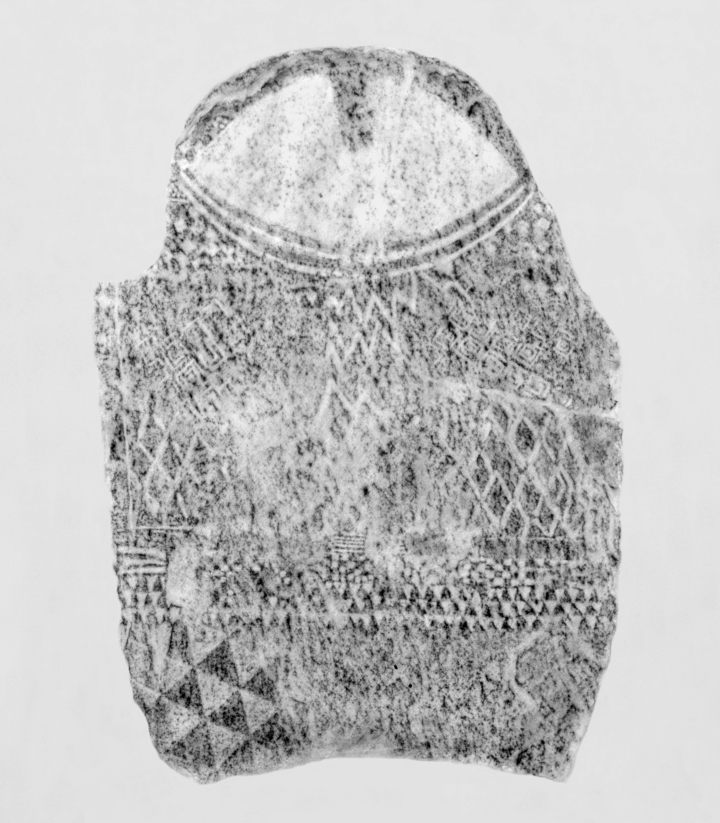
Stone rubbing of anthropomorphic stele no 15, Sion, Petit-Chasseur necropolis, Neolithic

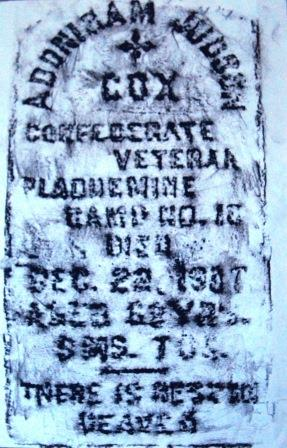
Gravestone rubbing of Confederate war veteran, Plaquemine, Louisiana

== See also ==
- Brass rubbing
- Frottage (art)
- Ishizuri-e, Japanese style of woodblock printing that mimics stone rubbing
- Nature printing – Pre-photographic printing process
- Squeeze (copying method)
