= The Eye of Silence =

Painting by Max Ernst

L'oeil du silence (The Eye of Silence)
- Artist: Max Ernst
- Year: c. 1943–44
- Medium: Oil on canvas
- Movement: Surrealism
- Dimensions: 110 cm × 143 cm (43 in × 56 in)
- Location: Mildred Lane Kemper Art Museum; St. Louis, Missouri
- Owner: Washington University in St. Louis

The Eye of Silence (French: L'oeil du silence), 1943–44, is a painting by German dadaist and surrealist Max Ernst.

== Description ==
For The Eye of Silence Max Ernst employed a technique called decalcomania to create arbitrary textures on the canvas, which he then reworked to resemble rock formations and forms of animals, plants, and architecture. The imagery on the surrealist canvas has been described as a primordial-like landscape, "in which rock-hard and gelatinous formations coexist under a forbidding sky." The Eye of Silence has also been described as, "part vegetation, part rock and part bejewelled baroque palace. A fusion of animal, mineral and vegetable, the painting's texture suggests bone, rag, feather and stone all at once, whilst the lake or chasm situated in its middle ground is carved out of a rock placed illogically against the sky…"

== Influence ==
A portion of the painting (the upper-left) was used as the original cover art for the mass market paperback printing of the 1958 science fiction novel A Case of Conscience. British science fiction writer J. G. Ballard was influenced by the painting, which was one of the main sources for Ballard's 1970 novel The Atrocity Exhibition.

The Ernst painting became the inspiration for the critically appraised film using the same title Eye of Silence by artist Charles Stankievech.
