= The Elephant Celebes =

Painting by Max Ernst

- Artist: Max Ernst
- Year: 1921
- Medium: Oil on canvas
- Dimensions: 125.4 cm × 107.9 cm (49.4 in × 42.5 in)
- Location: Tate Modern, London

The Elephant Celebes (or short Celebes) is a 1921 painting by the German Dadaist and surrealist Max Ernst. It is among the most famous of Ernst's early surrealist works and "undoubtedly the first masterpiece of Surrealist painting in the de Chirico tradition." It combines the vivid dreamlike atmosphere of Surrealism with the collage aspects of Dada.

== Description and influence ==
Giorgio de Chirico was an inspiration for the early Surrealists, and Celebes' palette and spatial construction show his influence. The painting also attempts to apply Dada's collage effects to simulate different materials. Ernst's realistic portrayal of the constituent elements produces a hallucinatory effect that he associated with collage, and was trying to achieve in this painting. Regarding the art of collage, Ernst said, "It is the systematic exploitation of the coincidental or artificially provoked encounter of two or more unrelated realities on an apparently inappropriate plane and the spark of poetry created by the proximity of these realities."

The central focus of the painting is a giant mechanical elephant. It is round and has a trunk-like hose protruding from it. The figure's round body was modeled after Robert Schomburgk's photograph of a two-legged clay guinea corn bin from a West African culture, the Konkomba. The photograph was published in a travel memoir and in an anthropological journal. Celebes suggests "ritual and totemic sculpture of African origin", evidenced by the totem-like pole at right and the figure's bull horns. The painting uniquely combines found imagery and non-Western visual elements, showing the artist's interest in African culture.

Ernst's creature has a frilly metallic cuff or collar, and a horned head and tail. The low horizon emphasizes the creature's bulk, and the gesture of the headless mannequin introduces the viewer to the figure. The mannequin wears a surgical glove, a common Surrealist symbol. This nude figure may have a mythological connotation, suggesting the abduction of Europa by Zeus while disguised as a bull. The mostly empty sky contains more incongruities: there are two fish 'flying' at left (one writer considers the scene to be underwater). The black shape to the right of the fish looks like an oncoming airplane, and there is a trail of smoke in the right part of the sky. These may be allusions to the "mechanical terror of the war experience" which led to Ernst writing, 'On the 1st of August 1914 Max Ernst died. He was resurrected on the 11 November 1918 as a young man who aspired to find the myths of his time.' Celebes, then, seems to represent the myth of destruction.

"Celebes" was once the popular name for the island of Sulawesi, one of the Greater Sunda Islands of Indonesia. Ernst told Roland Penrose that the title Celebes was derived from the opening words of a German schoolboys' rhyme with sexual connotations:

Der Elefant von Celebes
hat hinten etwas Gelebes.
Der Elefant von Sumatra,
der vögelt seine Grossmama.
Der Elefant von Indien,
der kann das Loch nicht findien.

The elephant from Celebes
has sticky, yellow bottom grease.
The elephant from Sumatra
always fucks his grandmama.
The elephant from India
can never find the hole ha-ha.

== History ==
The painting's short original title is Celebes, according to inscriptions on the front and back of the canvas. Ernst painted Celebes in Cologne in 1921. The French poet and Surrealist Paul Éluard visited Ernst that year and purchased the painting and took it back to Paris. Éluard would buy other of Ernst's paintings, and Ernst painted murals for Éluard's house in Eaubonne. It remained in Éluard's collection until 1938 and was then purchased by the English artist Roland Penrose. It has been in the collection of the Tate gallery, London, since 1975 and is displayed in the Tate Modern. The money from Penrose's sale of the painting was used to set up the grant-giving Elephant Trust which continues to administer bursaries to artists and small arts organisation in the UK. The back of the canvas is decorated with some doodles that are seemingly unconnected to the subject matter on the front of the canvas, including two figures holding golf clubs adjacent to the word "GOLF".

== In popular culture ==
The painting was the inspiration for the naming of the Elephant 6 recording collective. According to Apples in Stereo frontman Robert Schneider, he chose the name because he was enchanted by the painting but misheard its title.
