= Ishizuri-e =

Japanese woodblock prints

An ishizuri-e (石摺絵) is a Japanese woodblock print that mimics a stone rubbing. It has uninked images or text on a dark, usually black, background.

An ishizuri-e is a Japanese woodblock print that mimics a stone rubbing. It has uninked images or text on a dark, usually black, background. Okumura Masanobu was among the earliest artists to experiment with the technique, in which lines appear reversed, white against a roughened black background, so as to imitate the effect of rubbings taken from Chinese stone inscriptions.

== Gallery ==
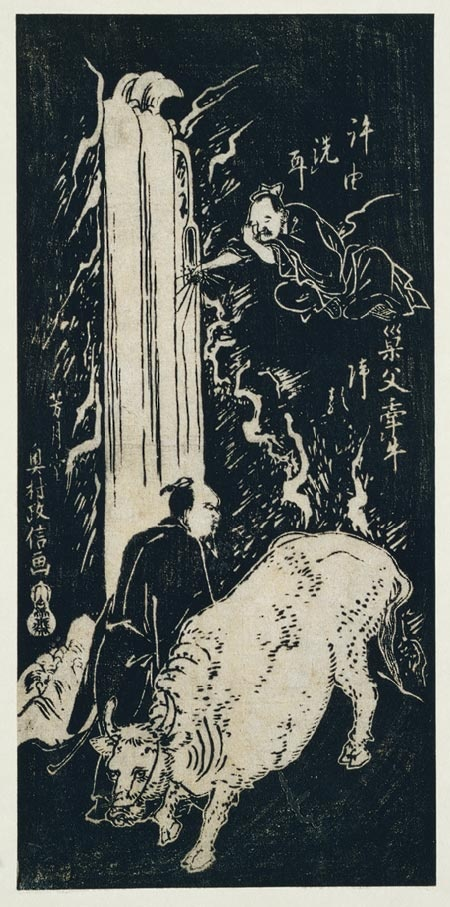
The Story of Kyoyu and Sofu, ishizuri-e by Okumura Masanobu, c. 1750

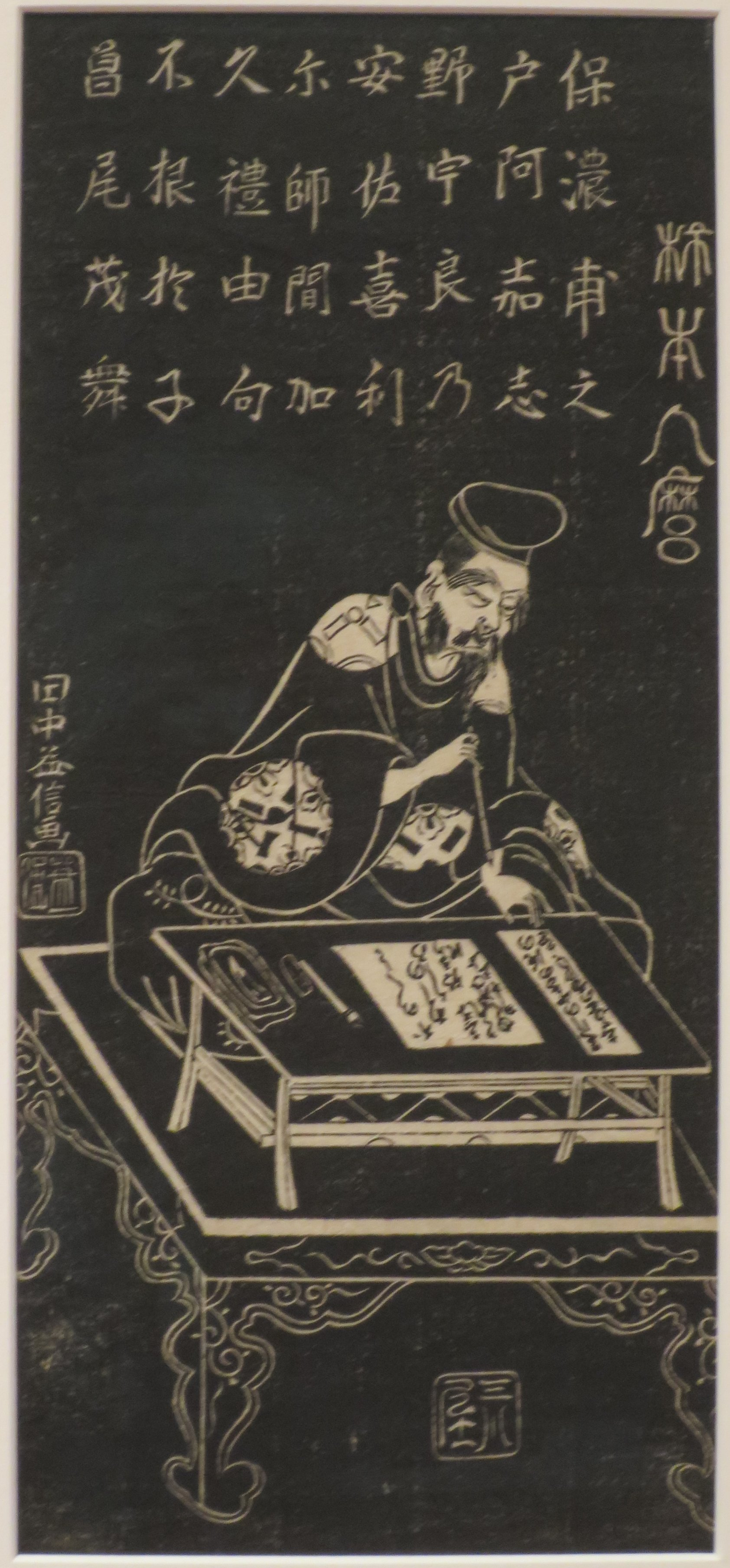
Poet Kakinomoto Hitomaro by Okumura Masanobu, c. 1740s

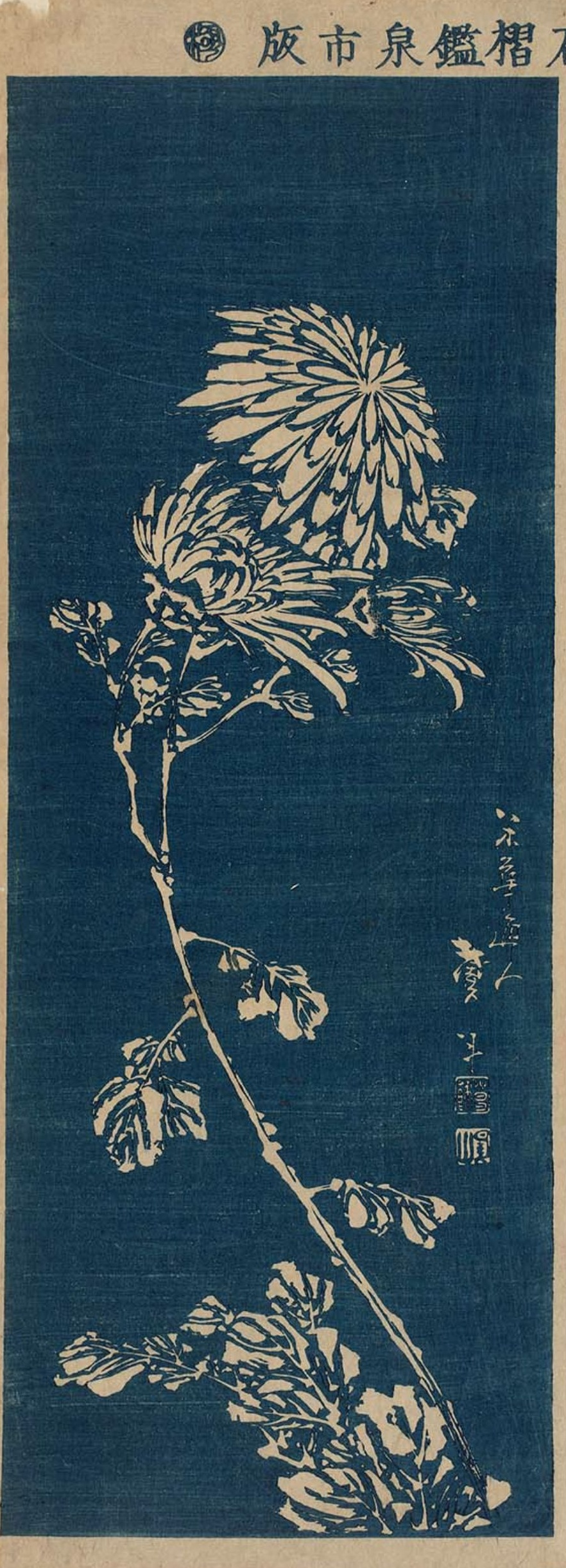
Chrysanthemum by Katsushika Taito I, c. 1830

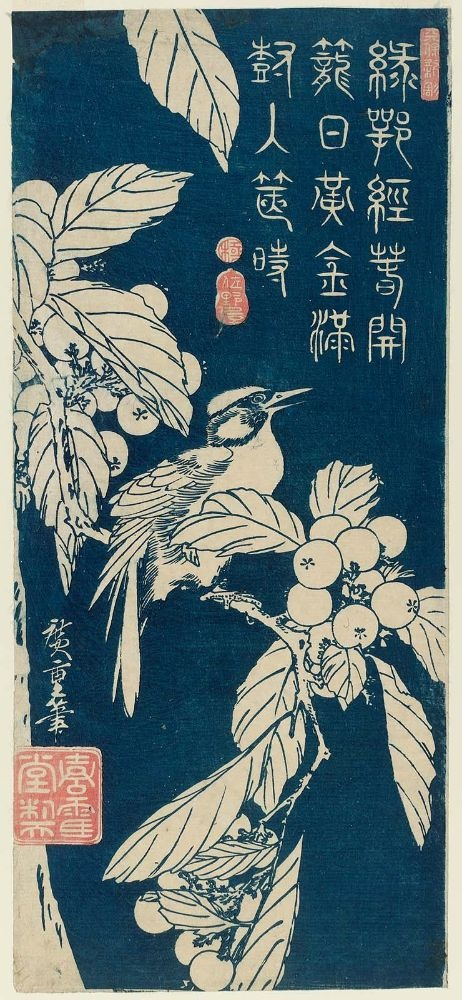
Hiroshige, c. 1840

== Further readings ==
- Lane, Richard, Images from the Floating World, The Japanese Print, New York, Dorset Press, 1978, p. 279 ISBN 0-88029-007-2
- Newland, Amy Reigle, Hotei Encyclopedia of Japanese Woodblock Prints, Amsterdam, Hotei, 2005, p. 447, ISBN 978-90-74822-65-7
- Media related to Ishizuri-e at Wikimedia Commons
