= Men Shall Know Nothing of This =

Painting by Max Ernst

- Von diesem wissen Männer nichts (German)
- Artist: Max Ernst
- Year: 1923
- Medium: Oil on canvas
- Dimensions: 81 cm × 64 cm (32 in × 25 in)
- Location: Tate Liverpool, Liverpool

Men Shall Know Nothing of This (German: Von diesem wissen Männer nichts) is oil on canvas painting by a German painter, sculptor, graphic artist, and poet Max Ernst. The painting was completed in 1923 in Paris, France. It is created in a Surrealism style by use of symbolic painting genre during the First French period. The painting measures 81 by 64 centimeters and is now housed at Tate Liverpool.

== Description ==
The painting shares several features with Silberer's diagram: its landscape setting and low horizon; the gradation of the sky from light at the bottom to dark at the top; and the inclusion of the Sun and the Moon. Ernst replaced the cube of Primal Matter with a pile of entrails. Elsewhere Ernst also employed alchemical motifs, such as in this painting of the sexual conjunction of Sun and Moon.
