= Luise Straus-Ernst =

German journalist and artist (1893–1944)

Luise Straus-Ernst (December 2, 1893 – d. early July 1944), also known as Louise Ernst, Louise Straus, Louise Ernst-Straus, or Luise Ernst-Straus, was a Jewish German art historian, writer, journalist, and artist, sometimes using an artistic Dadaist alias, Armada von Duldgedalzen.

She was the first wife of surrealist painter and sculptor Max Ernst and mother of painter Jimmy Ernst.

Being a Jew, when the Nazis came to power, she emigrated to France in 1933. With the outbreak of World War II she could not emigrate further and found refuge in a hotel in Manosque, Alpes-de-Haute-Provence, France, together with a group of other Jewish emigrants. There she wrote her autobiography Nomadengut. The manuscript survived and was published in 2000. On April 28, 1944, she was arrested in a raid and on June 30 deported to the Auschwitz concentration camp, where she was killed on an unknown date.

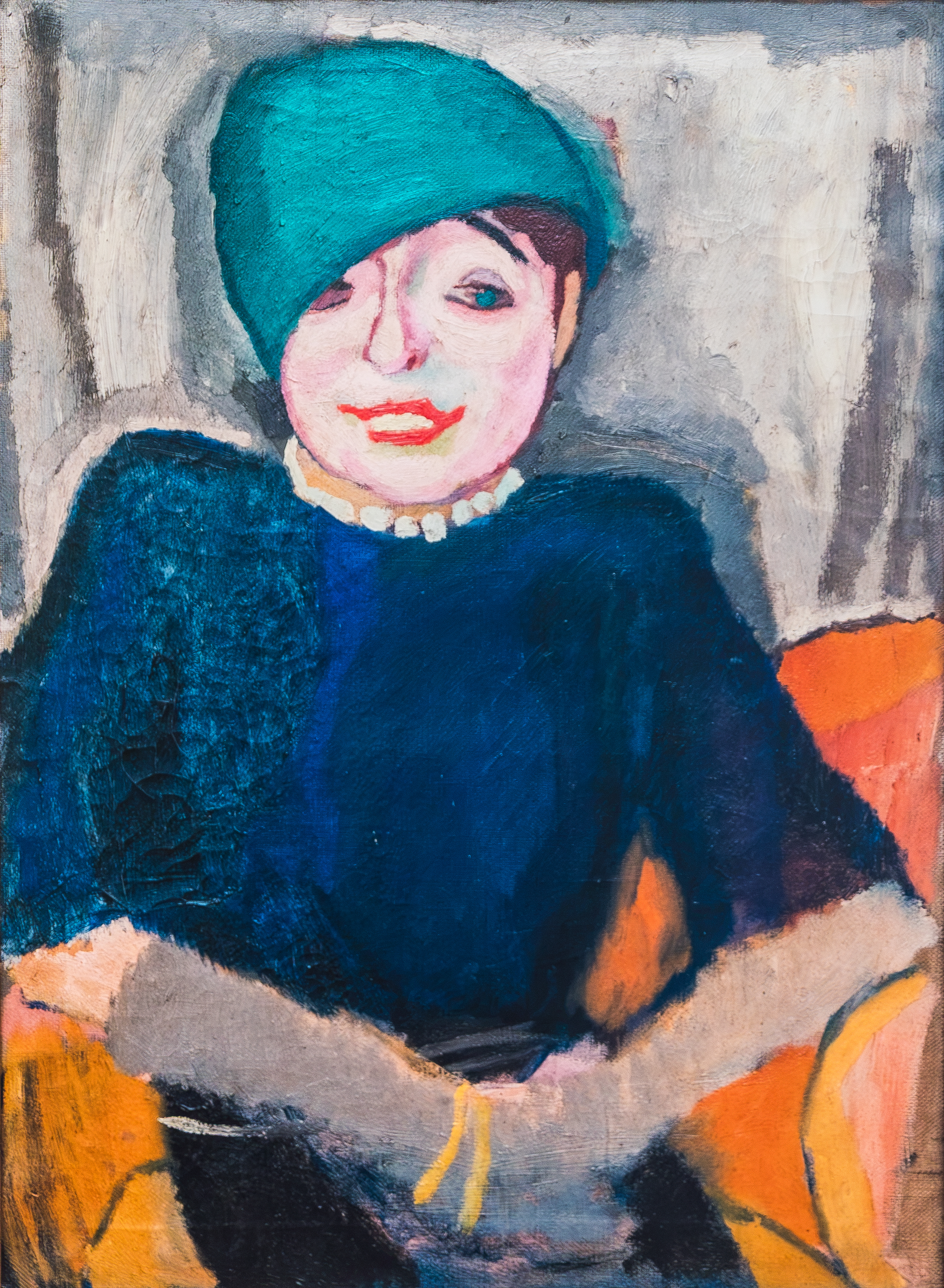
Painting by Hanns Bolz of Louise Straus-Ernst (before 1918)
