= Brass rubbing =

British craft of reproducing the images of commemorative brass plaques onto paper

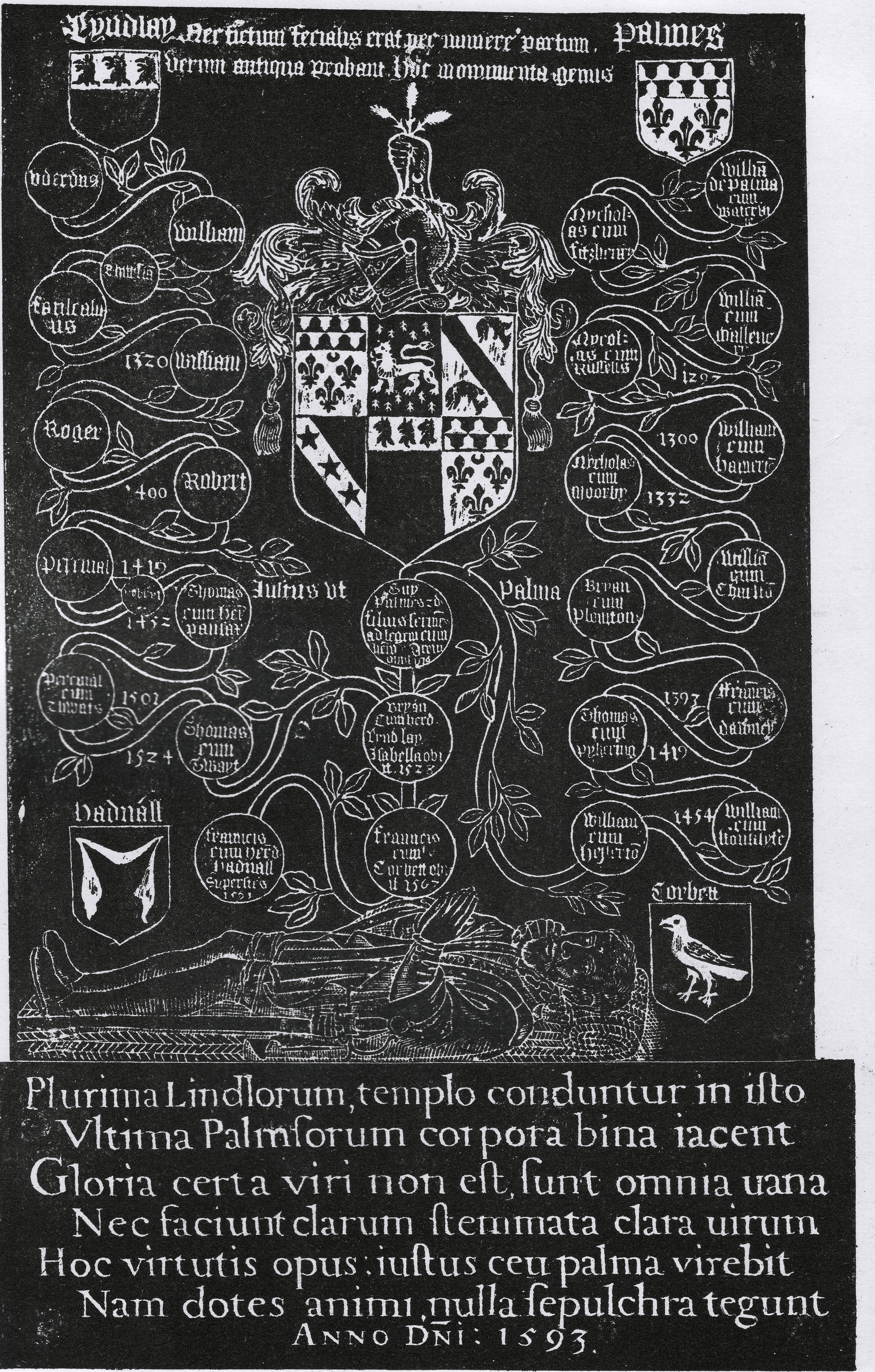
Brass rubbing of a memorial showing the alliance of the Lindley and Palmes family, Otley Church, West Yorkshire

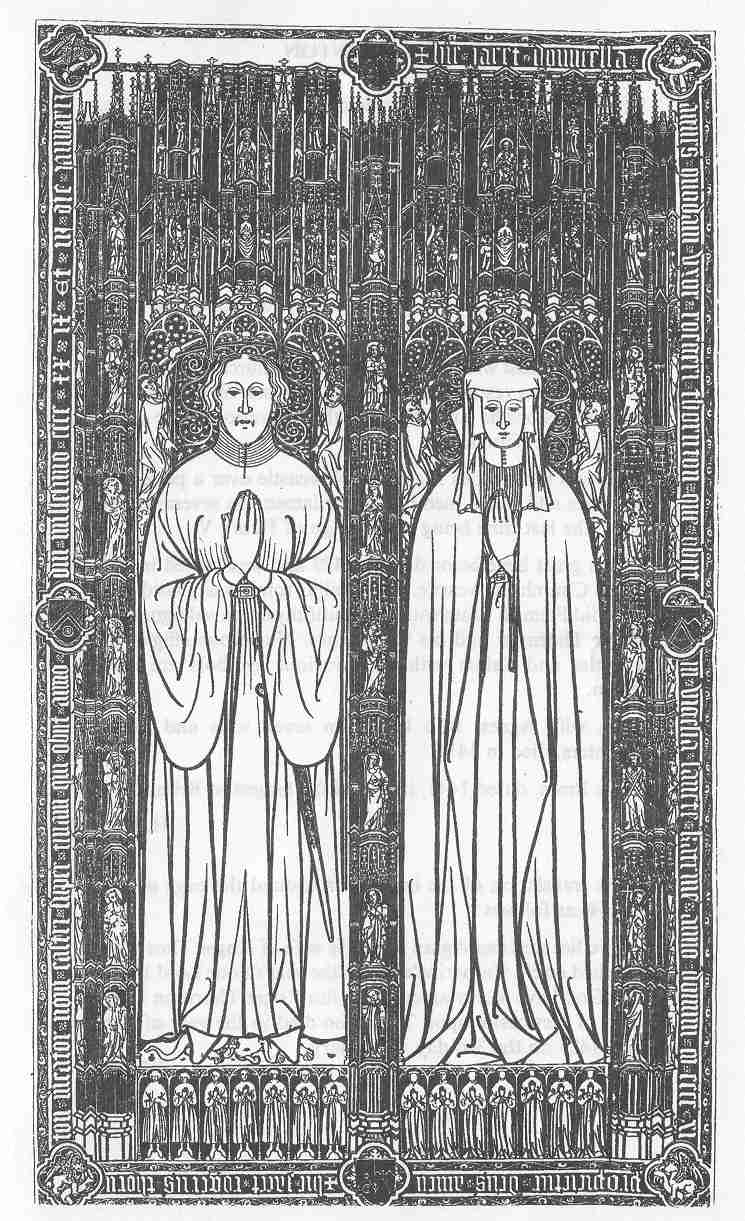
Rubbing of the Thorntons' brass, Newcastle Cathedral (Newcastle upon Tyne), believed to be the largest in the country. It is now displayed vertically opposite the east window, having been moved from the nearby All Saints' Church, rebuilt since the brass's era.

Brass rubbing was originally a largely British enthusiasm for reproducing onto paper monumental brasses – commemorative brass plaques found in churches, usually originally on the floor, from between the thirteenth and sixteenth centuries. It was particularly popular in Britain because of the large number of medieval brasses surviving there, more than in any other country. The concept of recording textures of things is more generally called making a rubbing. What distinguishes rubbings from frottage is that rubbings are meant to reproduce the form of something being transferred, whereas frottage is usually only intended to use a general texture.

Brass rubbings are created by laying a sheet of paper on top of a brass (then called "latten" – a zinc-copper alloy produced via the obsolete calamine brass process) and rubbing the paper with graphite, wax, or chalk, a process similar to rubbing a pencil over a piece of paper placed on top of a coin. In the past rubbings were most commonly made using the equivalent of what nowadays is called "butcher's paper" [a 22–30-inch-wide (560–760 mm) roll of whitish paper] laid down over the brass and rubbed with "heelball", a waxy glob of black crayon once used to shine shoes. Now most brass rubbers purchase special paper rolls of heavy duty black velvety material, and the crayons are gold, silver or bronze (other colours are available).

According to the Monumental Brass Society, the practice of brass rubbing does not harm a brass if competently carried out, assuming the brass is securely fixed. Nonetheless, in many cases creating rubbings is banned by historical sites and churches. Brass rubbing centres with replicas of original brass plaques have become a prime source for brass rubbings in the UK. Replicas are often not the same scale as the original.

== See also ==
- Bronze and brass ornamental work
- Stone rubbing – the practice of creating an image of surface features of a stone on paper
