= Une semaine de bonté =

1934 Surrealist book by Max Ernst

Une Semaine de Bonté (A Week of Kindness)
- All five of the original volumes of Une semaine de bonté.
- Premier Cahier (Book One); Deuxième Cahier (Book Two); Troisième Cahier (Book Three); Quartrième Cahier (Book Four); Cinquième Cahier (Book Five)
- Author: Max Ernst
- Illustrator: Max Ernst
- Country: France
- Language: French
- Discipline: Surrealist
- Published: 1934
- No. of books: 5

Une semaine de bonté ("A Week of Kindness") is a collage novel and artist's book by Max Ernst, first published in 1934. It comprises 182 images created by cutting up and re-organizing illustrations from Victorian encyclopedias and novels.

== History ==
The earliest comics by Ernst, Répétitions and Les malheurs des immortels, date from 1922, the year the artist moved to Paris. They were created in collaboration with poet Paul Eluard. Ernst went on to produce numerous comic-based paintings, and more comic books. The largest and most important before Une semaine de bonté were La femme 100 têtes (1929) and Rêve d'une petite fille qui voulut entrer au carmel (1930).

Une semaine de bonté was completed in 1933 in just three weeks, during a visit to Italy. A few of Ernst's sources were identified: these include illustrations from an 1883 novel by Jules Mary, Les damnées de Paris, and possibly a volume of works by Gustave Doré Ernst purchased in Milan. The completed novel was first published in Paris in 1934 as a series of five pamphlets in a limited edition of 816 copies each. It became more generally available when reprinted in 1976 as a combined single volume of 208 pages (including English translations) plus English preface, by Dover Publications in the US.

Until 2008, the original collages of Une semaine de bonté, which Max Ernst kept throughout his life, had only been exhibited once in their entirety: in March 1936 at the Museo Nacional de Arte Moderno (National Museum of Modern Art) in Madrid.

Modern exhibitions:

- 2008 Brühl, Max Ernst Museum
- 2008 Hamburg, Kunsthalle
- 2009 Madrid, Fundación cultural MAPFRE
- 2009 Paris, Musée d'Orsay

== Structure ==
The work originally appeared in five volumes, but is actually divided into seven sections named after the days of the week, beginning with Sunday. "Ernst had originally intended to publish it in seven volumes associating each book with a day of the week... The first four publication deliveries did not, however, achieve the success that had been anticipated. The three remaining 'days' were therefore put together into a fifth and final book."

The first four published volumes covered a day each, whereas the last volume covered three: Thursday, Friday, and Saturday. Each of the seven sections is associated with an element, and is provided with an example of the element, and an epigraph. The overall structure of the novel is as follows:

Volume	Day of the week	Element
Premier cahier (First book)	Dimanche (Sunday)	La boue (Mud)
Deuxième cahier (Second book)	Lundi (Monday)	L'eau (Water)
Troisième cahier (Third book)	Mardi (Tuesday)	Le feu (Fire)
Quatrième cahier (Fourth book)	Mercredi (Wednesday)	Le sang (Blood)
Cinquième cahier (Fifth book)
Cinquième cahier (Fifth book)	Jeudi (Thursday)	Le noir (Blackness)
Cinquième cahier (Fifth book)	Vendredi (Friday)	La vue (Sight)
Cinquième cahier (Fifth book)	Samedi (Saturday)	Inconnu (Unknown)

Furthermore, Thursday is subdivided into two subsections, based on two examples provided for "blackness", and Friday is subdivided into "trois poèmes visibles" ("three visible poems").

== Content ==
An image from Book Three of Une Semaine de Bonté.

Une semaine de bonté comprises 182 images created by cutting up and re-organizing illustrations from Victorian novels, encyclopedias, and other books. Ernst arranged the images to present a dark, surreal world. Most of the seven sections have a distinct theme that unites the images within. In Sunday the element is mud, and Ernst's example for this element is the Lion of Belfort; consequently, this section features numerous characters with lion heads.

The element of the next section, Monday, is water, and all of the images show water, either in a natural setting, or flowing inside bedrooms, dining rooms, etc. Some of the characters are able to walk on water, while others drown. The element associated with Tuesday is fire, and so most of the images in this section feature dragons or fantastic lizards. The last of the large sections, Wednesday, contains numerous images of bird-men.

The element of Thursday, "blackness", has two examples instead of one. The first example, "a rooster's laughter", is illustrated with more images of bird-men. The second example, Easter Island, is illustrated with images portraying characters with Moai heads. Friday, the most abstract part of the entire book, contains various images that resist categorization. They include collages of human bones and plants, one of which was used for the cardboard slipcase that was meant to house all five volumes of Une semaine de bonté. The final section of the book, Saturday, contains 10 images. The element given is "the key to songs"; the images are once again uncategorizable. The section, and with it the book, ends with several images of falling women.

No full interpretation of Une semaine de bonté has ever been published. The book, like its predecessors, has been described as projecting "recurrent themes of sexuality, anti-clericalism and violence, by dislocating the visual significance of the source material to suggest what has been repressed." An analysis of Sunday was published by psychologist Dieter Wyss, who subjected the work to post-Freudian psychoanalysis in his book Der Surrealismus (1950).
