= Max Ernst =

German artist (1891–1976)

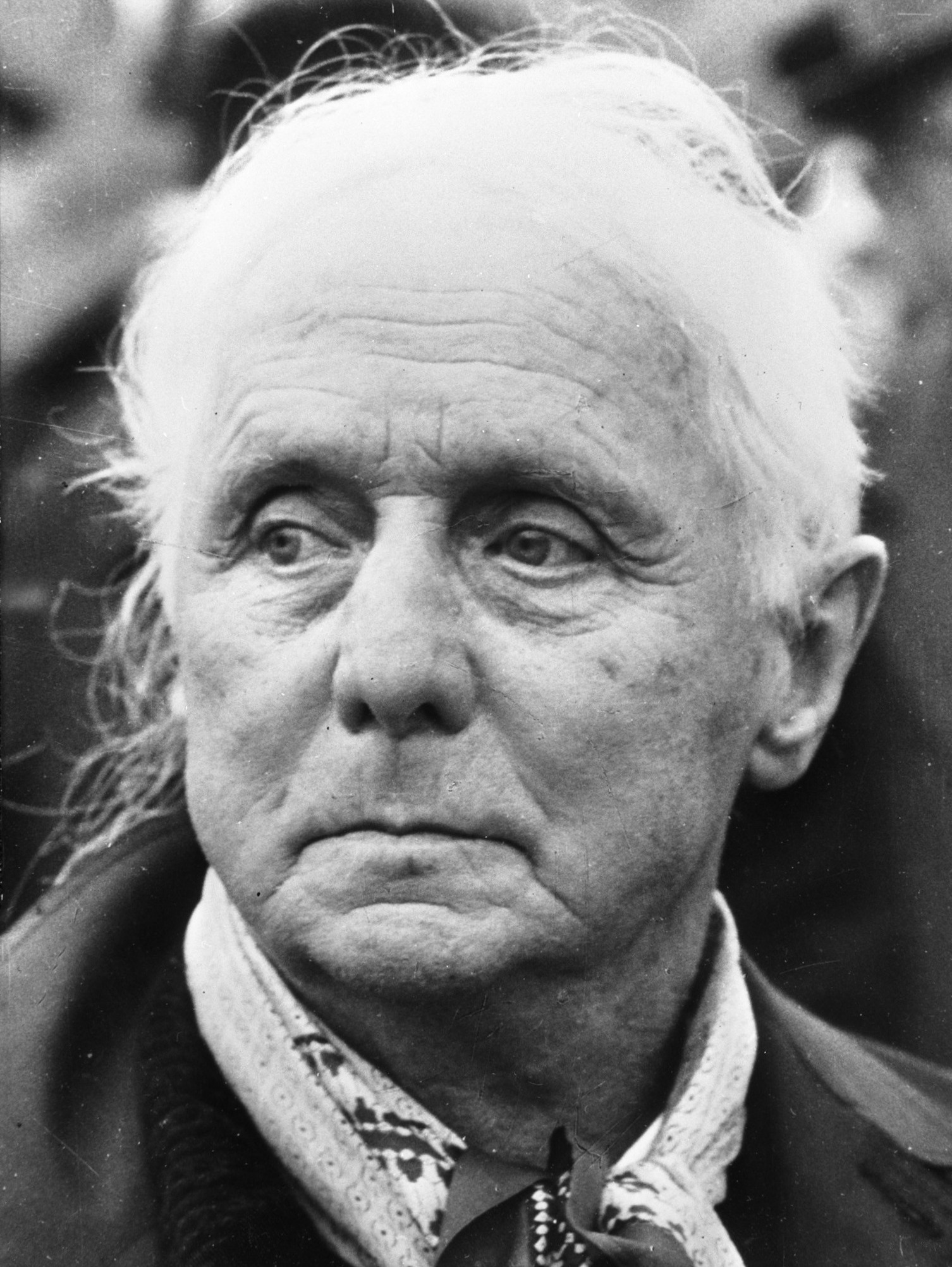
- Max Ernst in 1968
- Born: Maximilian Maria Ernst; 2 April 1891; Brühl, Rhine Province, Prussia German Empire
- Died: 1 April 1976 (aged 84); Paris, France
- Known for: Painting, sculpture, poetry
- Notable work: The Elephant Celebes (1921); A Week of Kindness (1934)
- Movement: Dada, Surrealism
- Spouses: Luise Straus (m. 1918–1927) Marie-Berthe Aurenche (m. 1927–1942) Peggy Guggenheim (m. 1942–1946) Dorothea Tanning (m. 1946)

Max Ernst (/ɜːrnst/; German: [ɛʁnst] 2 April 1891 – 1 April 1976) was a German-born painter, sculptor, printmaker, graphic artist, and poet. A prolific artist, Ernst was a pioneer of the Dada movement and surrealism in Europe. He had no formal artistic training, but his experimental attitude toward the making of art resulted in his invention of frottage—a technique that uses pencil rubbings of textured objects and relief surfaces to create images—and grattage, an analogous technique in which paint is scraped across canvas to reveal the imprints of the objects placed beneath. Ernst is noted for his unconventional drawing methods as well as for creating novels and pamphlets using the method of collages. He served as a soldier for four years during World War I, which left him shocked and critical of the modern world. During World War II he was designated an "undesirable foreigner" while living in France.

Ernst was born in Brühl. He began painting in 1909 while studying at the University of Bonn, and later joined Die Rheinischen Expressionisten group of artists. Ernst's work often had ironic juxtapositions of grotesque elements with cubist and expressionist motifs. He had a fascination with birds, often including his alter ego, Loplop, a bird, in his work. He eventually settled in France and achieved financial success in the 1950s. He died in Paris on 1 April 1976.

== Early life ==
Max Ernst was born in Brühl, south of Cologne, the third of nine children of a middle-class Catholic family. His father Philipp was a teacher of the deaf and an amateur painter, a devout Christian and a strict disciplinarian. He inspired in Max a penchant for defying authority, while his interest in painting and sketching in nature influenced Max to take up painting.

In 1909, Max Ernst enrolled in the University of Bonn, to read philosophy, art history, literature, psychology, and psychiatry. He visited asylums and became fascinated with the artwork of the mentally ill patients; he also began painting that year, producing sketches in the garden of the Brühl castle, and portraits of his sister and himself. In 1911, Max befriended August Macke and joined his Die Rheinischen Expressionisten group of artists, deciding to become an artist.

In 1912, Max Ernst visited the Sonderbund exhibition in Cologne, where works by Pablo Picasso and post-Impressionists such as Vincent van Gogh and Paul Gauguin profoundly influenced him. His work was exhibited that year together with that of the Das Junge Rheinland group, at Galerie Feldman in Cologne, and then in several group exhibitions in 1913. In his paintings of this period, Ernst adopted an ironic style that juxtaposed grotesque elements alongside Cubist and Expressionist motifs.

In 1914, Ernst met Hans Arp in Cologne. The two became friends and their relationship lasted for fifty years. After Ernst completed his studies in the summer, his life was interrupted by World War I. Ernst was drafted and served both on the Western and the Eastern Fronts. The effect of the war on Ernst was devastating; in his autobiography, he wrote of his time in the army thus: "On the first of August 1914 M[ax].E[rnst]. died. He was resurrected on the eleventh of November 1918". For a brief period on the Western Front, Ernst was assigned to chart maps, which allowed him to continue painting. Several German Expressionist painters died in action during the war, among them August Macke and Franz Marc.

== Dada and surrealism ==
Max Ernst, Ubu Imperator, 1923, Musée National d'Art Moderne, Centre Pompidou, Paris

In 1918, Ernst was demobilised and returned to Cologne. He soon married art history student Luise Straus, of Jewish ancestry, whom he had met in 1914. In 1919, he visited Paul Klee in Munich and studied paintings by Giorgio de Chirico. In the same year, inspired by de Chirico and mail-order catalogues, teaching-aide manuals and similar sources, he produced his first collages (notably Fiat modes, a portfolio of lithographs), a technique which later dominated his artistic pursuits. Also in 1919, Ernst, social activist Johannes Theodor Baargeld and several colleagues founded the Cologne Dada group. In 1919–20, Ernst and Baargeld published various short-lived magazines such as Der Strom, die Schammade and organised Dada exhibitions.

Ernst and Luise's son Ulrich 'Jimmy' Ernst was born on 24 June 1920; he later would also become a painter. Ernst's marriage to Luise was short-lived. In 1921, he met Paul Éluard, who became a lifelong friend. Éluard bought two of Ernst's paintings (Celebes and Oedipus Rex) and selected six collages to illustrate his poetry collection Répétitions. A year later the two collaborated on Les malheurs des immortels and then with André Breton, whom Ernst met in 1921, on the magazine Littérature. In 1922, unable to secure the necessary papers, Ernst entered France illegally and settled into a ménage à trois with Éluard and his wife Gala in the Paris suburb of Saint-Brice, leaving behind his wife and son. During his first two years in Paris, Ernst took various odd jobs to make a living and continued to paint. In 1923, the Éluards moved to a new home in Eaubonne north of Paris, where Ernst painted numerous murals. The same year his works were exhibited at Salon des Indépendants.

Although apparently accepting the ménage à trois, Éluard eventually became more concerned about the affair. In 1924, he abruptly left, first for Monaco and then for Saigon, Vietnam. He soon asked his wife and Max Ernst to join him; both had to sell paintings to finance the trip. Ernst went to Düsseldorf and sold a large number of his works to a long-time friend, Johanna Ey, owner of gallery Das Junge Rheinland. After a brief time together in Saigon, the trio decided that Gala would remain with Paul. The Éluards returned to Eaubonne in early September, while Ernst followed them some months later, after exploring more of southeast Asia. He returned to Paris in late 1924 and soon signed a contract with Jacques Viot which allowed him to paint full-time. In 1925, Ernst established a studio at 22, rue Tourlaque.

In 1925, Ernst invented a graphic art technique called frottage (see surrealist techniques), which uses pencil rubbings of objects as a source of images. He also created the 'grattage' technique, in which paint is scraped across canvas to reveal the imprints of the objects placed beneath. He used this technique in his famous painting Forest and Dove (as shown at the Tate Modern). The next year he collaborated with Joan Miró on designs for Sergei Diaghilev. With Miró's help, Ernst developed grattage, in which he trowelled pigment from his canvases. He also explored with the technique of decalcomania, which involves pressing paint between two surfaces. (Note: Max Ernst working in decalcomania is shown in the 1978 documentary on the Dada and Surrealist art movement, Europe After the Rain.) Ernst was also active, along with fellow surrealists, at the Atelier 17.

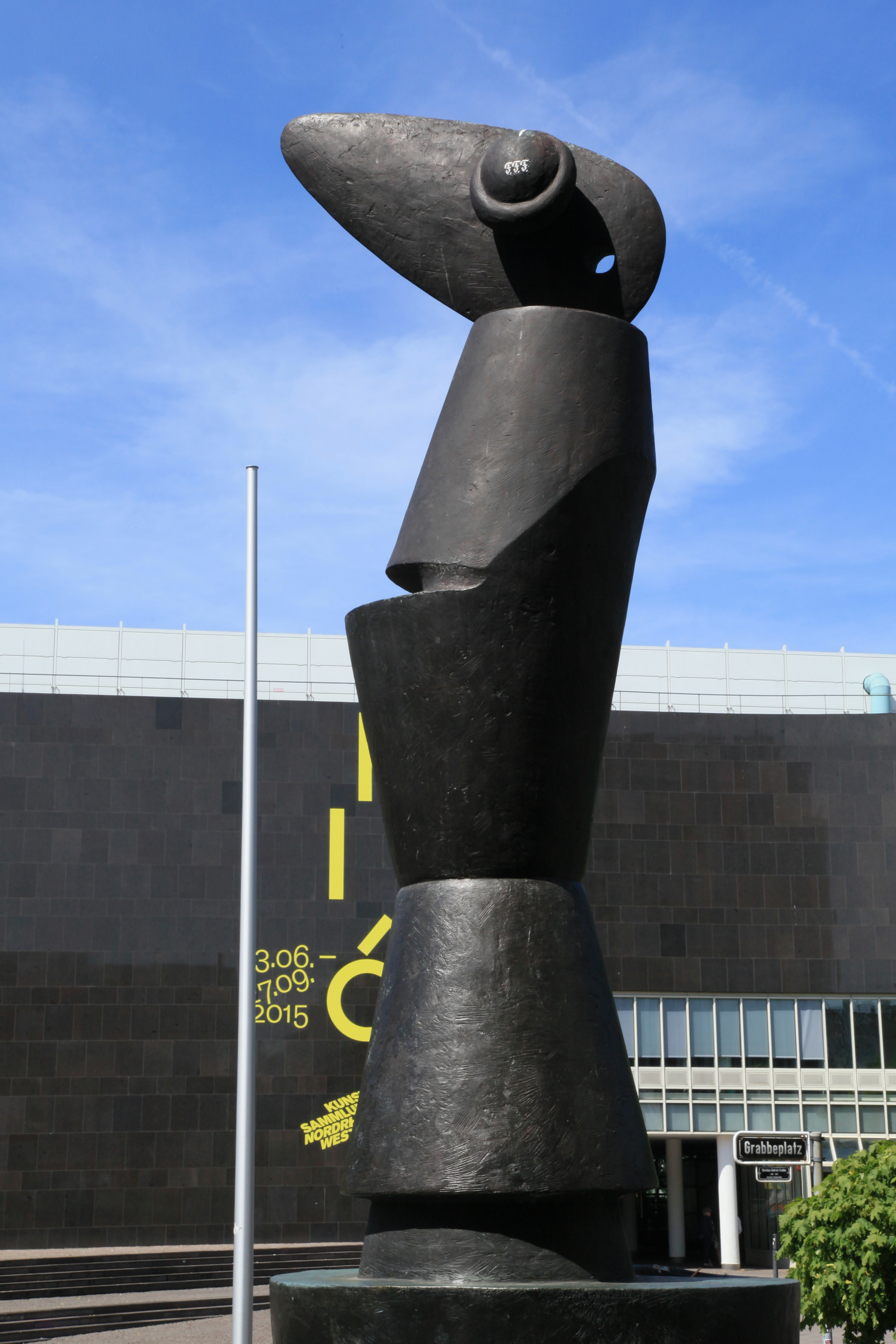
Habakuk (1934), bronze, Kunsthalle Düsseldorf, Düsseldorf

Ernst developed a fascination with birds which was prevalent in his work. His alter ego in paintings, which he called Loplop, was a bird. He suggested that this alter-ego was an extension of himself stemming from an early confusion of birds and humans. He said that one night when he was young, he woke up and found that his beloved bird had died; a few minutes later, his father announced that his sister was born. Loplop often appeared in collages of other artists' work, such as Loplop presents André Breton. Ernst drew a great deal of controversy with his 1926 painting The Virgin Chastises the infant Jesus before Three Witnesses: André Breton, Paul Éluard, and the Painter. In 1927, he married Marie-Berthe Aurenche and it is thought his relationship with her may have inspired the erotic subject matter of The Kiss and other works of that year. He appeared in the 1930 film L'Âge d'Or, directed by the surrealist Luis Buñuel. Ernst began to sculpt in 1934 and spent time with Alberto Giacometti. In 1938, the American heiress and artistic patron Peggy Guggenheim acquired a number of Max Ernst's works, which she displayed in her new gallery in London. Ernst and Guggenheim were married from 1942 to 1946.

== World War II and later life ==
One of two versions of L'Ange du Foyer or The Angel of Hearth and Home (1937) oil on canvas, 112.5 x 144 cm., private collection

In September 1939, the outbreak of World War II caused Ernst, being German, to be interned as an "undesirable foreigner" in Camp des Milles, near Aix-en-Provence, along with fellow surrealist, Hans Bellmer, who had recently emigrated to Paris. He had been living with his lover and fellow surrealist painter, Leonora Carrington who, not knowing whether he would return, saw no option but to sell their house in Saint-Martin-d'Ardèche to repay their debts and leave for Spain. Thanks to the intercession of Paul Éluard and other friends, including the journalist Varian Fry, he was released a few weeks later. Soon after the German occupation of France, he was arrested again, this time by the Gestapo, but managed to escape to America with the help of Fry and Peggy Guggenheim. Ernst and Guggenheim arrived in the United States in 1941 and were married at the end of the year. Along with other artists and friends (Marcel Duchamp and Marc Chagall) who had fled from the war and lived in New York City, Ernst helped inspire the development of abstract expressionism.

His marriage to Guggenheim did not last. In October 1946 he married American surrealist painter Dorothea Tanning in a double ceremony with Man Ray and Juliet P. Browner in Beverly Hills, California. The couple made their home in Sedona, Arizona from 1946 to 1953, where the high desert landscapes inspired them and recalled Ernst's earlier imagery. Although Sedona was remote and populated by fewer than 400 ranchers, orchard workers, merchants and small Native American communities, their presence helped begin what would become an American artists' colony. Among the monumental red rocks, Ernst built a small cottage with his own hands on Brewer Road and he and Tanning hosted intellectuals and European artists such as Henri Cartier-Bresson and Yves Tanguy. Sedona proved an inspiration for the artists and for Ernst, who compiled his book Beyond Painting and completed his sculpture Capricorn while living in Sedona. As a result of the book and its publicity, Ernst began to achieve financial success. From the 1950s he lived mainly in France. In 1954 he was awarded the Grand Prize for painting at the Venice Biennale. He died at the age of 84 on 1 April 1976 in Paris and was interred at Père Lachaise Cemetery.

Max Ernst and Dorothea Tanning

== Legacy ==
Ernst's son Jimmy Ernst, a well-known German/American abstract expressionist painter, who lived on the south shore of Long Island, New York died in 1984. His memoirs, A Not-So-Still Life, were published shortly before his death. Max Ernst's grandson Eric and his granddaughter Amy are both artists and writers.

Max Ernst's life and career are examined in Peter Schamoni's 1991 documentary Max Ernst. Dedicated to the art historian Werner Spies, it was assembled from interviews with Ernst, stills of his paintings and sculptures, and the memoirs of his wife Dorothea Tanning and son Jimmy. The 101-minute German film was released on DVD with English subtitles by Image Entertainment.

The Max Ernst Museum opened in 2005 in his home town Brühl, Germany. It is housed in a late-classicist 1844 building integrated with a modern glass pavilion. The historic ballroom was once a popular social venue visited by Ernst in his youth. The collection spans 70 years of his career including paintings, drawings, frottages, collages, nearly the entire lithographic works, over 70 bronze sculptures. and more than 700 documents and photographs by Man Ray, Henri Cartier-Bresson, Lee Miller, and others. The core of the collection dates back to 1969 with works donated to the City of Brühl by the artist. Thirty-six paintings, gifts from the artist to his fourth wife Dorothea Tanning, are on permanent loan from the Kreissparkasse Köln. Some noteworthy works include the sculptures The King playing with the Queen (1944) and Teaching Staff for a School of Murderers (1967). The museum also host temporary exhibitions by other artist.

The Menil Collection, in Houston houses a significant collection of surrealist art including well over 100 pieces by Max Ernst. Notable paintings include In Praise of Freedom (1926), Loplop Presents Loplop (1930), Day and Night (1941–1942), Surrealism and Painting (1942), Euclid (1945), A Swarm of Bees in the Palais de Justice (1960), The Marriage of Heaven and Earth (1964). Ernst's work in the Menil Collection is typically exhibited a few pieces at a time along with other surrealist art in the collection on a rotating basis.

=== Exhibitions, retrospectives, and honors ===
- Venice Biennale, Venice (1954), received Grand Prize for Painting
- Musée National d'Art Moderne Paris (1959), awarded the Grand Prix national des arts
- Museum of Modern Art, New York (1961)
- Tate Gallery, London (1962)
- Kunsthaus Zürich (1963)
- Moderna Museet, Stockholm (1969)
- A retrospective of 104 works spanning the years 1920–1968, drawn entirely from the Menil Collection, toured Europe from 1970 to 1972 (Hamburger Kunsthalle, Kestnergesellschaft, Frankfurter Kunstverein, Academy of Arts, Berlin, Kunsthalle, Cologne, Musée de l'Orangerie, Musée Cantini, Maison de la Culture de Grenoble, Ancienne Douane (Strasbourg), Musée d'Arts de Nantes) and later the US (Nelson-Atkins Museum of Art, Fogg Art Museum, The Art Institute of Chicago, Solomon R. Guggenheim Museum) The opening of the exhibition in Paris was augmented with 44 pieces from various collations and opened on 2 April 1971, Max Ernst's 80th birthday.
- In 2005, "Max Ernst: A Retrospective" opened at the Metropolitan Museum of Art and included works like Celebes (1921), Ubu Imperator (1923), and Fireside Angel (1937), which is one of Ernst's few definitively political pieces and is sub-titled The Triumph of Surrealism depicting a raging bird-like creature that symbolises the wave of fascism that enveloped Europe. The exhibition also includes Ernst's works that experiment with free association writing and the techniques of frottage, created from a rubbing from a textured surface; grattage, involving scratching at the surface of a painting; and decalcomania, which involves altering a wet painting by pressing a second surface against it and taking it away.
- Max Ernst National Gallery of Art, Washington, D.C. (2008)
- Dada is Dada retrospective group exhibition at Bildmuseet, Umeå University, Sweden, running from 17 November 2017 to 20 May 2018
- Max Ernst: Natural History (1926) Museo de Arte Abstracto Español, Cuenca (16 November 2018 - 12 May 2019) and Museu Fundación Juan March, Palma (30 October 2019 - 1 February 2020) exhibit of Ernst's Histoire naturelle portfolio

Documentary images

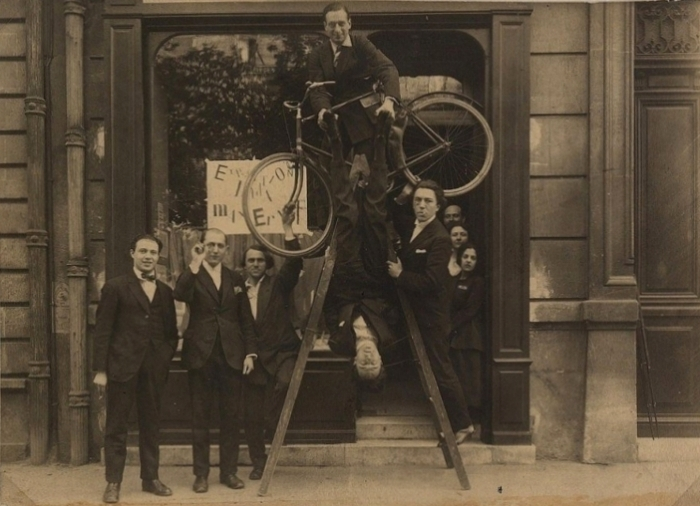
Opening of the Max Ernst exhibition at the gallery Au Sans Pareil, May 2, 1921. Left to right: René Hilsum, Benjamin Péret, Serge Charchoune, Philippe Soupault (top of the ladder), Jacques Rigaut (upside down), André Breton and Simone Kahn-Breton

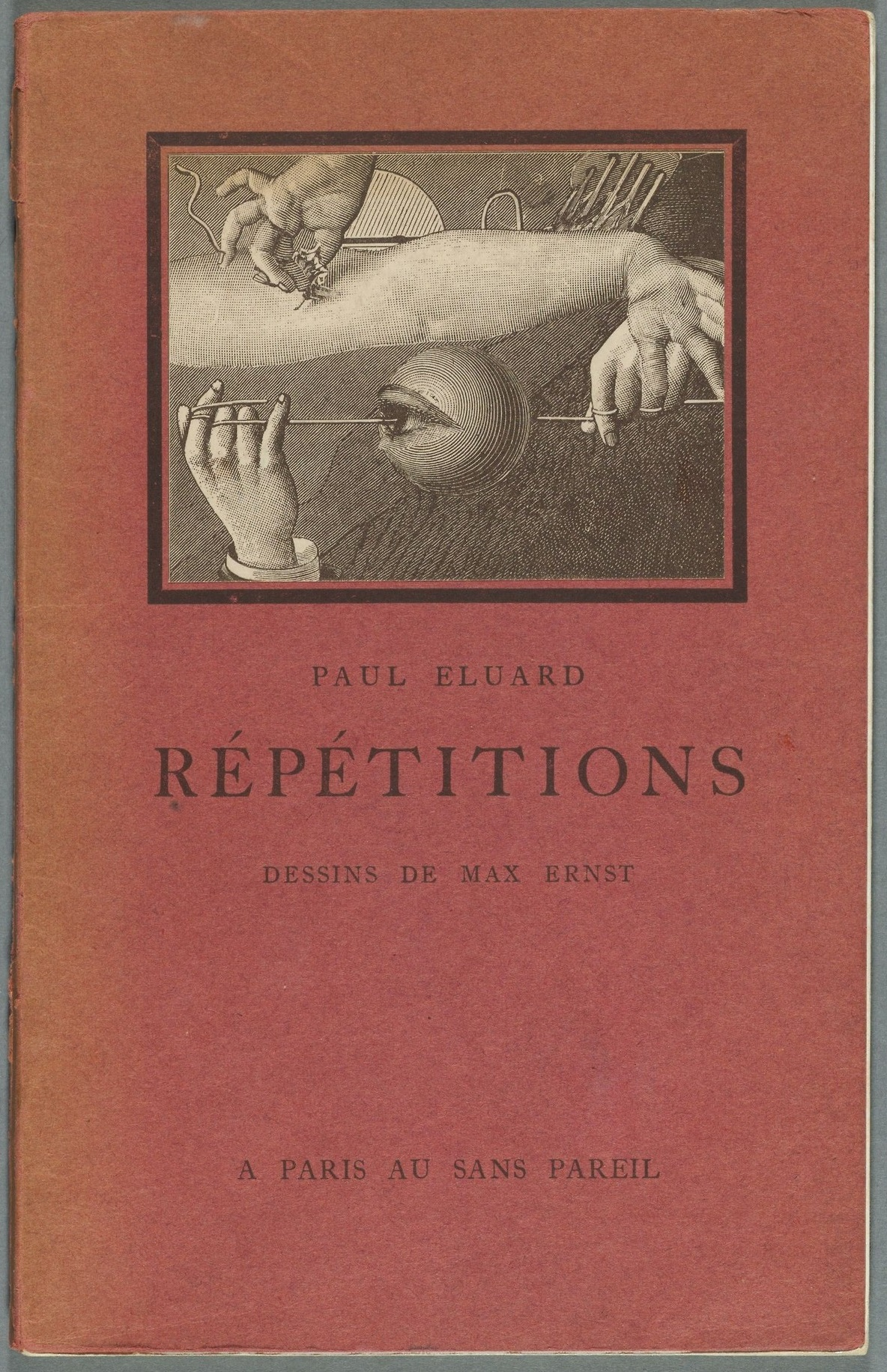
Cover of Répétitions (1922) by Paul Éluard, with illustrations by Max Ernst

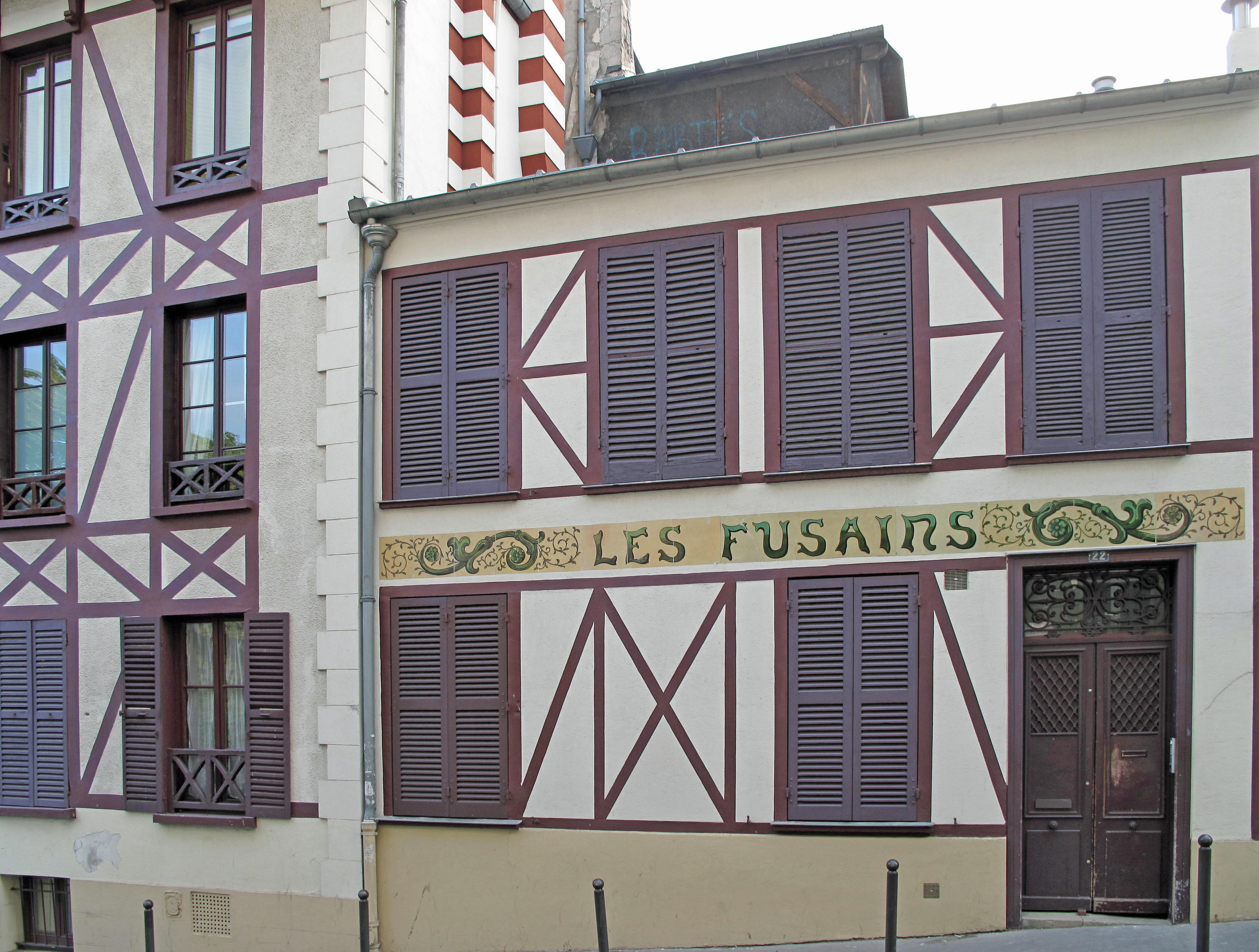
"Les Fusains": 22, rue Tourlaque, 18th arrondissement of Paris where Max Ernst established a studio in 1925

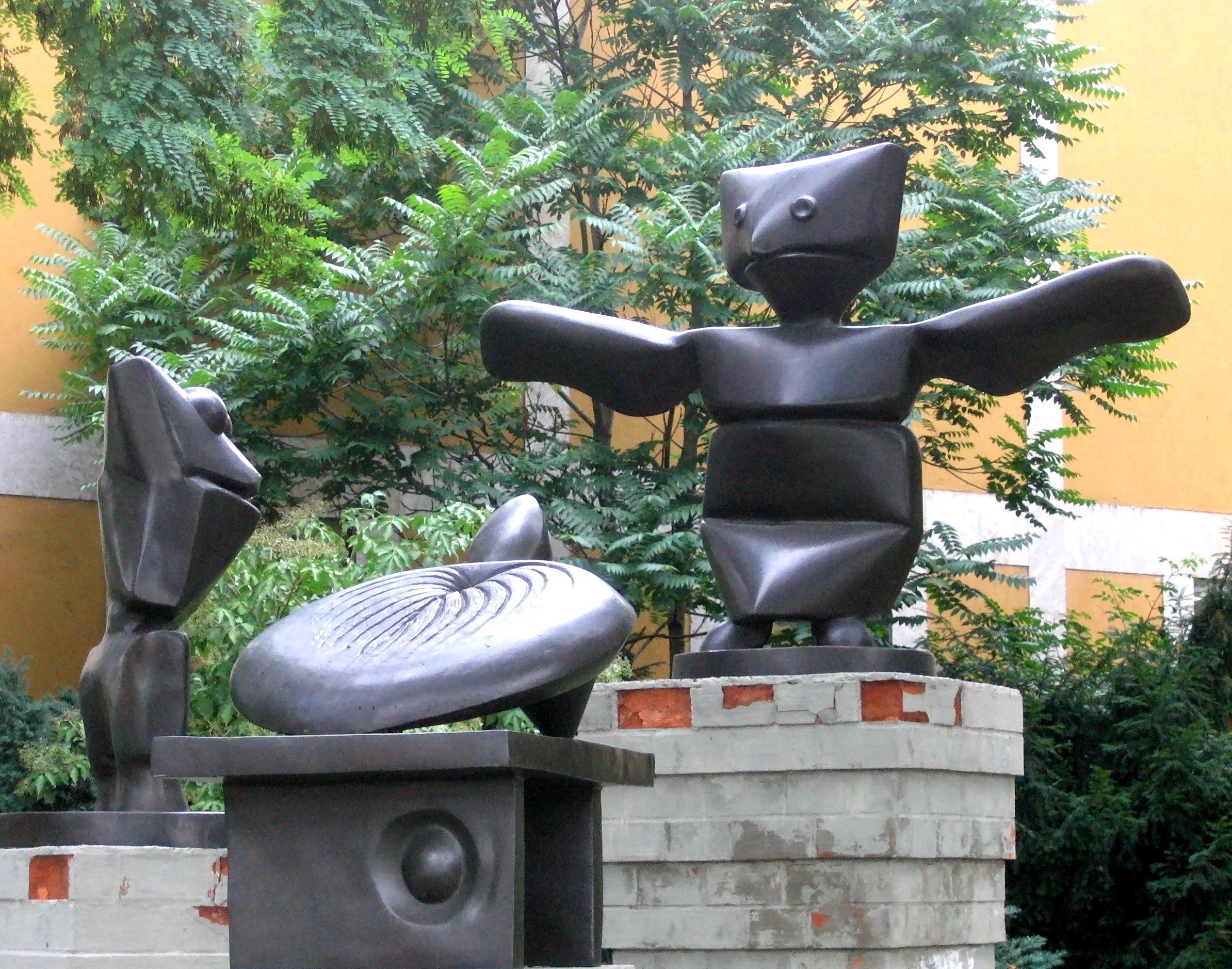
Three bronze sculptures: left to right: Large Frog (1967), Turtle (1944), and The Spirit of the Bastille (1961), Lenbachhaus, Munich

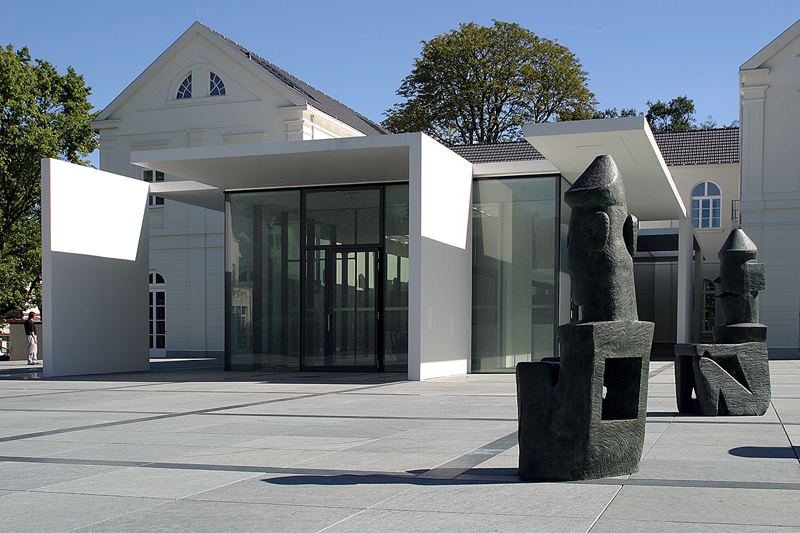
Max Ernst Museum, Brühl, Germany (photo 2004)

== Selected works ==
=== Early work, Germany (1891–1922) ===
- Crucifixion (1913), Wallraf-Richartz Museum, Cologne
- Town with Animals or Landscape (c. 1916), Solomon Guggenheim Museum, New York
- Aquis Submersus (1919), Städel, Frankfurt
- Fiat modes (1919), portfolio of eight lithographs
- Trophy, Hypertrophied (1919), Museum of Modern Art, New York
- Little Machine Constructed by Minimax Dadamax in Person (1919–1920), Peggy Guggenheim Collection
- He's Not Very Well, the Hairy-hoofed Horse (1920) Turin Civic Gallery
- Dada Gauguin (1920), The Art Institute of Chicago
- Murdering Airplane (1920), Menil Collection, Houston
- The Hat Makes the Man (1920), Museum of Modern Art, New York
- The Elephant of the Celebes (1921), Tate Modern, London
- Oedipus Rex (1922), Private Collection

=== First French period (1922–1940) ===
- All Friends Together (1922), Wallraf-Richartz Museum, Cologne
- Pietà or Revolution by Night (1923), Tate Modern, London
- The Wavering Woman (1923), Kunstsammlung Nordrhein-Westfalen, Düsseldorf
- Saint Cecilia (1923), Staatsgalerie, Stuttgart
- Of This Men Shall Know Nothing (1923), Tate Modern, London
- Ubu Imperator (1923), Musée National d'Art Moderne, Paris
- Two Children Are Threatened by a Nightingale (1924), Museum of Modern Art, New York
- Woman, Old Man and Flower (1924), Museum of Modern Art, New York
- Paris Dream (1924–25), Yale University Art Gallery, New Haven
- The Blessed Virgin Chastises the Infant Jesus (1926), Museum Ludwig, Cologne
- The Great Forest (1927), Kunstmuseum, Basel
- Forest and Dove (1927), Tate Modern, London
- The Wood (1927), National Museum Cardiff, Cardiff
- Shell Flowers (1929), Musée National d'Art Moderne, Paris
- Inside Sight: the Egg (1929), Menil Collection, Houston
- Loplop Introduces Loplop (1930), Menil Collection, Houston
- Loplop Introduces a Young Girl (1930), Musée National d'Art Moderne, Paris
- Oedipus I and II (both 1934), bronze sculpture (multiples)
- Lunar Asparagus (1935), plaster sculpture, Museum of Modern Art, New York
- Garden Plane Trap (1934–35), Philadelphia Museum of Art, Philadelphia
- The Giant Snake (1935).
- The Entire City (1935–36), Kunsthaus, Zürich
- The Blind Swimmer, Effect of Touch (1934), Museum of Modern Art, New York
- The Joy of Living (1936), Scottish National Gallery of Modern Art, Edinburg
- The Nymph Echo (1936), Museum of Modern Art, New York
- The Angel of Hearth and Home (1937), Neue Pinakothek, Munich
- The Barbarians (1937), Metropolitan Museum of Art, New York
- The Fascinating Cypress (1940), Sprengel Museum, Hanover
- The Robing of the Bride (1940), Peggy Guggenheim Collection, Venice

=== American period (1941–1952) ===
- Totem and Taboo (1941), Pinakothek der Moderne, Munich, [see Freud, Totem and Taboo]
- Marlene (1941), Menil Collection, Houston
- Napoleon in the Wilderness (1941), Museum of Modern Art, New York
- Day and Night (1941–42), Menil Collection, Houston
- The Antipope (1942), Peggy Guggenheim Collection, Venice
- Europe After the Rain II (1940–42), Wadsworth Athenaeum, Hartford
- Surrealism and Painting (1942), Menil Collection, Houston
- The Bewildered Planet (1942), Tel Aviv Museum of Art, Tel-Aviv
- Vox Angelica (1943), Private collection
- Everyone Here Speaks Latin (1943), New Orleans Museum of Art, New Orleans
- Painting for Young People (1943), Menil Collection, Houston
- Moonmad (1944), bronze sculpture (multiples)
- An Anxious Friend (1944), bronze sculpture (multiples)
- The Eye of Silence (1944), Washington University Gallery of Art, St. Louis
- Le Déjeuner sur l'Herbre (1944), Cleveland Museum of Art, Cleveland
- The Temptation of Saint Anthony (1945), Lehmbruck Museum, Duisburg
- The Phases of the Night (1946), Private collection
- Dream and Revolution (1947), Private collection
- Design in Nature (1947), Menil Collection, Houston
- Capricorn (1948), bronze sculpture (multiples)
- A Beautiful Day (1948), featured in the Painting toward architecture exhibition (1947–52)
- Feast of the Gods (1948), Mumok, Vienna
- Paramythes (1949), collages with poems
- Inspired Hill (1950), Menil Collection, Houston
- Spring in Paris (1950), Wallraf-Richartz Museum, Cologne

=== Second French period (1953–1976) ===
- Colorado of Medusa, Color-Raft of Medusa (1953), Private collection
- Cry of the Gull (1953), Menil Collection, Houston
- Father Rhine (1953), Kunstmuseum, Basel
- The King Playing with the Queen (1954), bronze sculpture (multiples)
- The Twentieth Century (1955), Menil Collection, Houston
- Bird-head (1955–56), bronze sculpture (multiples)
- The Dark Gods (1957), Museum Folkwang, Essen
- Albertus Magnus (1957), Menil Collection, Houston
- After Me Comes Sleep: Tomb of the Poet (1958), Musée National d'Art Moderne, Paris
- Little Girls out to Hunt the White Butterflies (1958), Thyssen-Bornemisza Museum, Madrid
- Mundus est fabula (1959), Museum of Modern Art, New York
- Explosion in a cathedral (1960), Museo Botero, Bogotá
- The Garden of France (1962), Musée National d'Art Moderne, Paris
- Serenity (1963), Menil Collection, Houston
- The Marriage of Heaven and Earth (1964), Menil Collection, Houston
- The World of the Naive (1965), Private collection
- Ubu, Father and Son (1966), Private collection
- Teaching Staff for a School of Murderers (1967), bronze sculptures (multiples)
- Birth of a Galaxy (1969), Beyeler Foundation, Riehen
- The Last Forest (1960–1970), Private collection
- The Night Prowling Fish (1974), Private collection

=== Prints, collages, and illustrations ===
- Illustrations for books by Paul Éluard: Répétitions (1922), Les malheurs des immortels (1922), Au défaut du silence (1925)
- Histoire Naturelle (ca. 1925–1926), a set of 34 collotypes after frottages
- La femme 100 têtes (1929, graphic novel)
- Rêve d'une petite fille qui voulut entrer au carmel (1930, graphic novel)
- Une Semaine de Bonté (1934, graphic novel)
- Illustrations for editions of works by Lewis Carroll: Symbolic Logic (1966, under the title Logique sans peine), The Hunting of the Snark (1968), and Lewis Carrols Wunderhorn (1970, an anthology of texts)
- Deux Oiseaux (1970, lithograph in colors)
- Aux petits agneaux (1971, lithographs)
- Paysage marin avec capucin (1972, illustrated book with essays by various authors)
- Maximiliana: the illegal practice of astronomy : hommage à Dorothea Tanning (1974, art book)
- Oiseaux en péril (1975, etchings with aquatint in colours; published posthumously)

== See also ==
- List of German painters
- Transatlantic (portrayal in 2023 TV series)
