= Rubbing (art) =

Reproduction technique

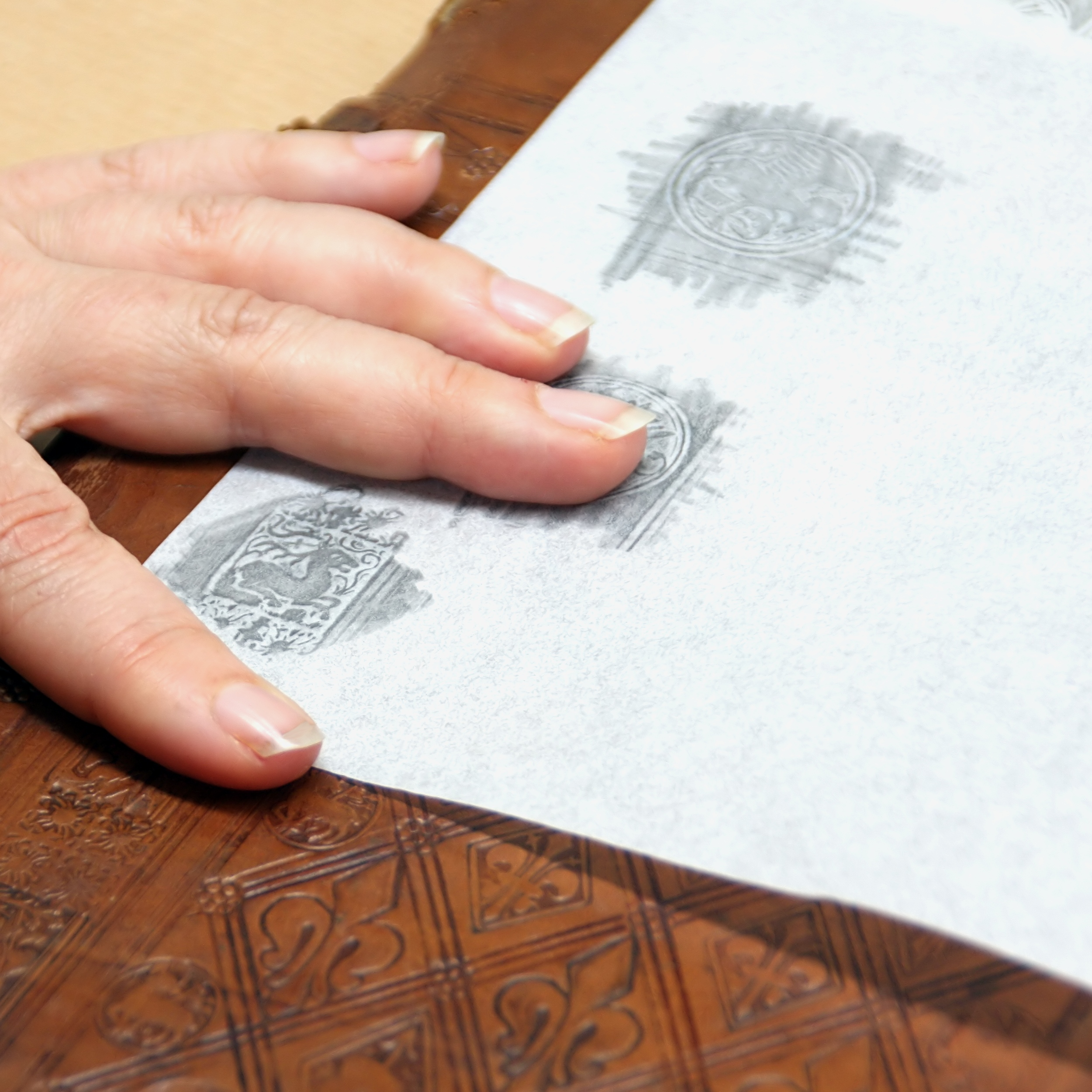
A rubbing of portions of a book cover

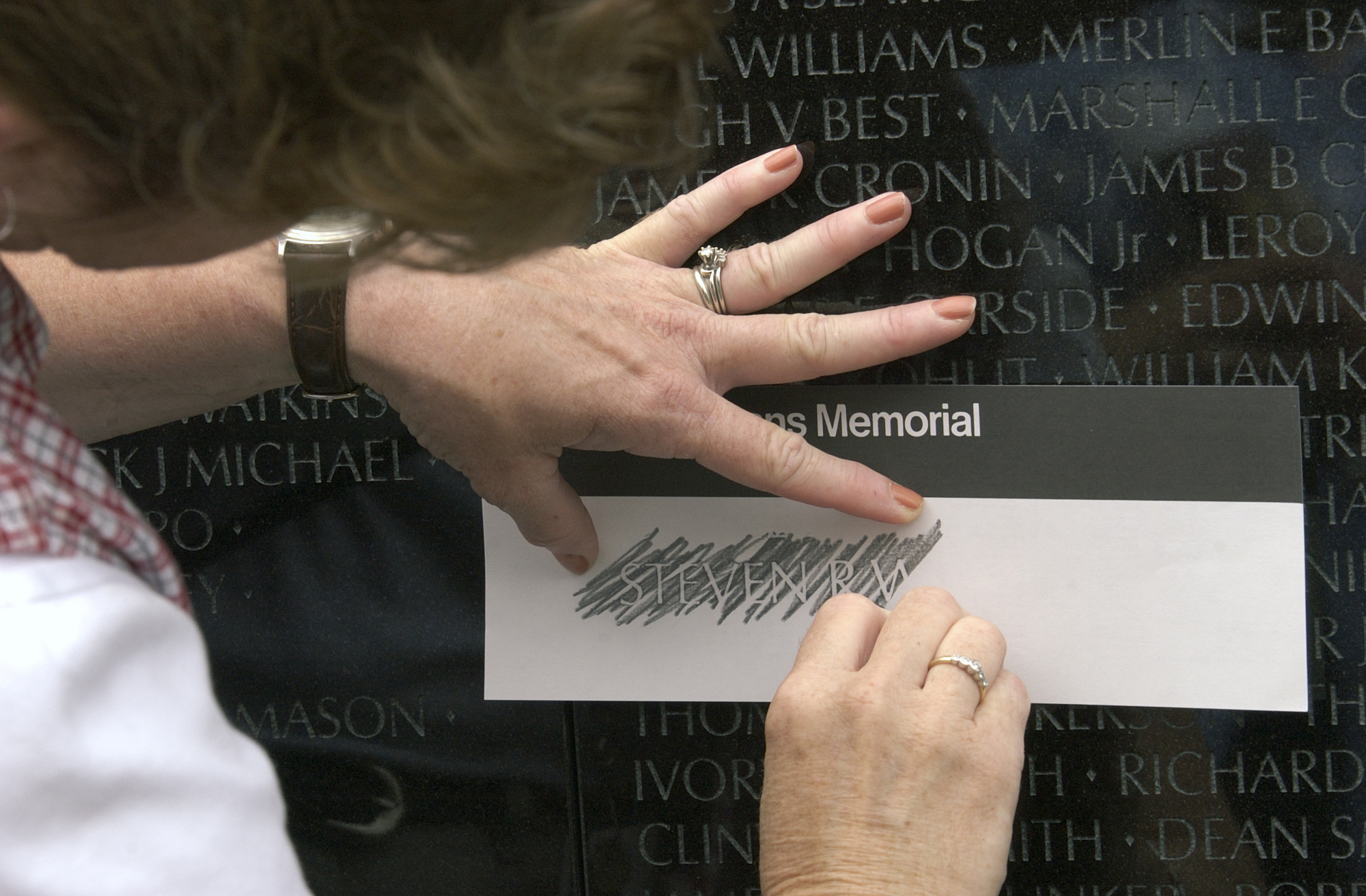
Visitors to the Vietnam Veterans Memorial make rubbings of names.

A rubbing (frottage) is a reproduction of the texture of a surface created by placing a piece of paper or similar material over the subject and then rubbing the paper with something to deposit marks, most commonly charcoal or pencil but also various forms of blotted and rolled ink, chalk, wax, and many other substances. For all its simplicity, the technique can be used to produce blur-free images of minuscule elevations and depressions on areas of any size in a way that can hardly be matched by even the most elaborate, state-of-the-art methods. In this way, surface elevations measuring only a few thousandths of a millimeter can be made visible.

== Uses ==
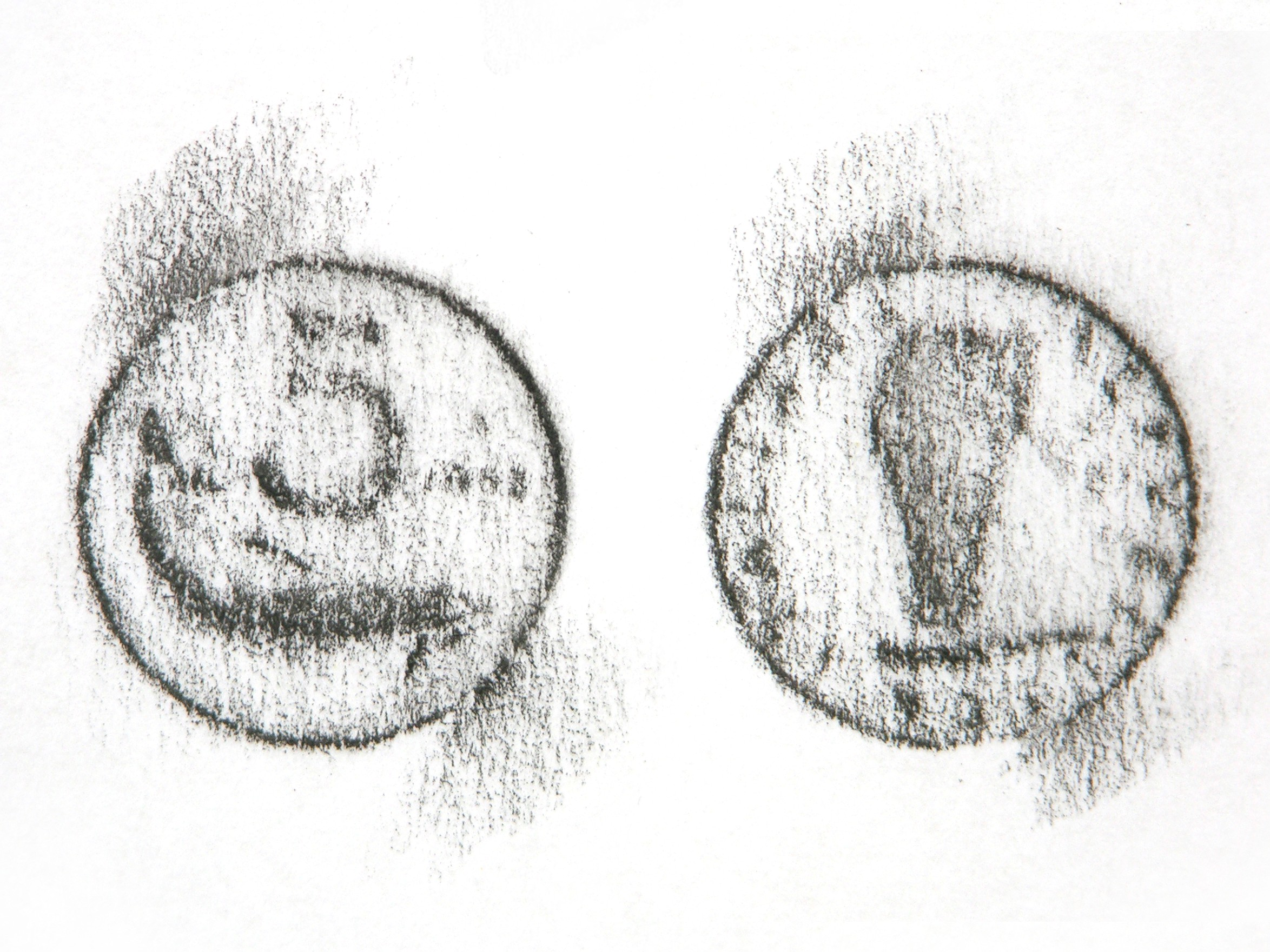
Coin image using the frottage technique

Common uses for this technique include:

- Brass rubbing, to make copies of monumental brasses
- Forensic uses, including finding out what was written on a sheet of paper removed from a pad by rubbing the impressions left on subsequent sheets or other backing materials
- Frottage (from French frotter, "to rub"), a surrealist art form; a method of creative production developed by surrealist artist Max Ernst in 1925. The artist places a piece of paper over an uneven surface, then marks the paper with a drawing tool (such as a pastel or pencil), thus creating a rubbing. The drawing can be left as it is or used as the basis for further refinement. Ernst was inspired by an ancient wooden floor where the grain of the planks had been accentuated by many years of scrubbing. The patterns of the graining suggested strange images to him. He captured these by laying sheets of paper on the floor and then rubbing over them with a soft pencil.
- Stone rubbing, to make copies of patterns and inscriptions of gravestones or other incised or textured stone surfaces

== See also ==
- Surrealist techniques
- Estampage

== Bibliography ==
- West, Shearer (1996). The Bullfinch Guide to Art. UK: Bloomsbury Publishing Plc. ISBN 0-8212-2137-X.
