= René Magritte Museum =

Art museum in Brussels, Belgium

- Musée René Magritte (French); René Magritte Museum (Dutch)
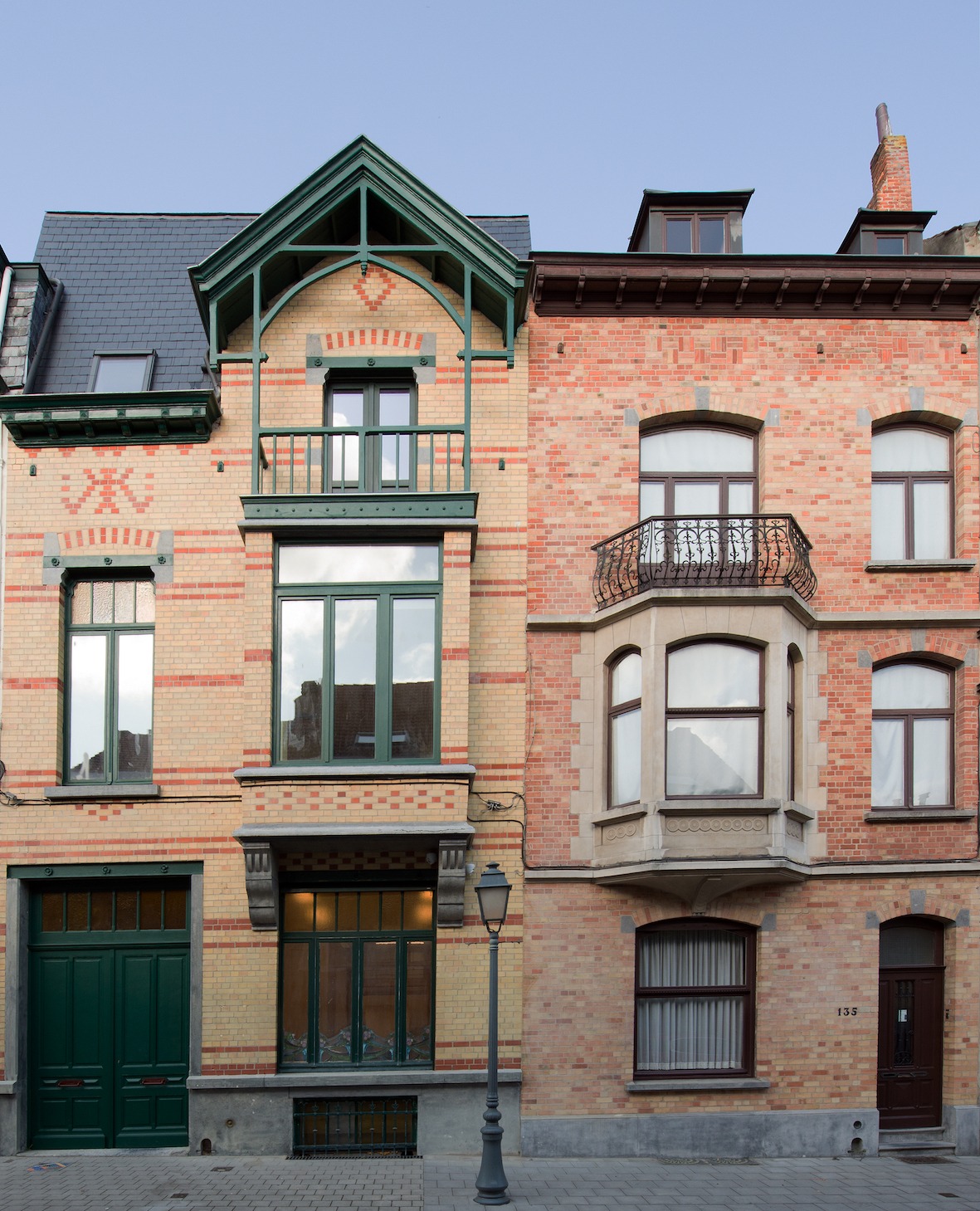
- The René Magritte Museum (right) and the Museum of Abstract Art (left)
- Interactive fullscreen map
- Established: 1999; 27 years ago
- Location: Rue Esseghem / Esseghemstraat 135, 1090 Jette, Brussels-Capital Region, Belgium
- Coordinates: 50°52′36″N 4°20′09″E
- Type: Art museum
- Website: www.magrittemuseum.be

The René Magritte Museum (French: Musée René Magritte; Dutch: René Magritte Museum) is a museum in Jette, a municipality in Brussels, Belgium, devoted to the surrealist artist René Magritte.

The museum is located at 135, rue Esseghem/Esseghemstraat, in the house where Magritte lived and worked for twenty-four years, between 1930 and 1954. On the ground floor of the house is the apartment where Magritte and his wife Georgette resided, while the first and the second floors display a biographical exhibition.

== History ==
René Magritte, originally from the Walloon province of Hainaut, moved to Brussels in 1915 at the age of 17 and lived in seven different apartments until his death in 1967. He only interrupted these Brussels years by staying in the Parisian suburb of Le Perreux-sur-Marne, where he lived from 1927 to 1930. Back in Belgium, Magritte and his wife Georgette rented the ground floor apartment of 135, rue Esseghem/Esseghemstraat. The artist created half of his work there (800 paintings), drawing abundant inspiration from its interior. The apartment also served as headquarters for the Brussels surrealist group of which Magritte was then a part and which included Paul Nougé, E.L.T. Mesens, Louis Scutenaire, Irène Hamoir Scutenaire, Paul Colinet and Marcel Mariën.

René and Georgette moved in 1954 to a bigger villa in Schaerbeek, which, as they thought, was better suited to their social status. In Georgette's will, however, she indicated that the house in Jette was the most important for Magritte's biography. After Georgette's death in 1986, there were requests to convert the couple's last villa into a museum, but this failed due to a lack of financial resources and support from state institutions. The Schaerbeek villa, as well as Magritte's inventory and personal belongings, were sold at auction. André Garitte, an art collector and a fan of Belgian Surrealism, began in the following years to acquire property from the Magrittes. He eventually bought the building at 135, rue Esseghem, which still belonged to the family of Magritte's former landlords. Starting in 1993, he restored the house, and in 1999, celebrating Magritte's 100th anniversary, the museum was open to the public. In 2009, the museum reopened after an extensive restoration.

== Description ==
Magritte's former apartment is located on the ground floor of the brick terraced house, typical of the Brussels region. The house does not have any particular architectural features. The artist drew inspiration for his work from his daily surroundings, and several objects from the apartment are found in his paintings. These include the fireplace and glass doors to the living room, the staircase, as well as details such as the door handles. The lamppost in front of the house also appears several times in Magritte's works.

André Garitte managed to find back around 70% of Magritte's furniture. Georgette's Gunther piano, and the modernist furniture that Magritte designed for his wife as a wedding gift are on display at the museum. The apartment has been reconstructed identically using testimonies and photographic archives. Thus, the solid colour of the walls is authentic.

Magritte used to paint in the dining room. In 1932, he had a workshop built at the bottom of the garden, but he did not like it for painting and used it mainly for his food work as an advertiser.

== Exhibition ==
In addition to the ground floor apartment, the museum has two exhibition floors. Among the items on display are illustrated letters, surrealist brochures or newspaper articles. In addition, the collection presents 30 drawings, gouaches and paintings by Magritte. These include works such as Aladdin's Lamp and Lola of Valence. The painting Olympia, which forms part of the museum's collection, was stolen on 24 September 2009 during a hold-up. It was returned but is no longer on display.

One room of the museum is dedicated to other Belgian surrealists. It features works by E.L.T. Mesens, Marcel Mariën, Paul Delvaux, Rachel Baes, Jane Graverol and Pierre Sanders.

== Museum of Abstract Art ==
Since November 2019, the Museum of Abstract Art (French: Musée d'art abstrait; Dutch: Museum voor Abstracte Kunst) has opened next to the René Magritte Museum, at no. 137, and is linked to it. The two museums can be visited together.

The museum focuses on Belgian abstract art, with a collection of over 750 works, a third of which are on permanent display. The second floor presents the historical avant-garde of the 1920s, with major figures including Victor Servranckx, Georges Vantongerloo, Jozef Peeters and Pierre-Louis Flouquet. René Magritte originally painted in this style and was close to these artists. The ground floor and third floor showcase the second generation of abstract artists (from the 1950s to the 1980s and beyond), both geometric and lyrical (Pierre Alechinsky, Pol Bury, Gaston Bertrand, Jean Rets, Jo Delahaut, etc.).

== See also ==
- List of museums in Brussels
- List of single-artist museums
- History of Brussels
- Culture of Belgium
