= Roger Van de Wouwer =

Belgian painter and illustrator

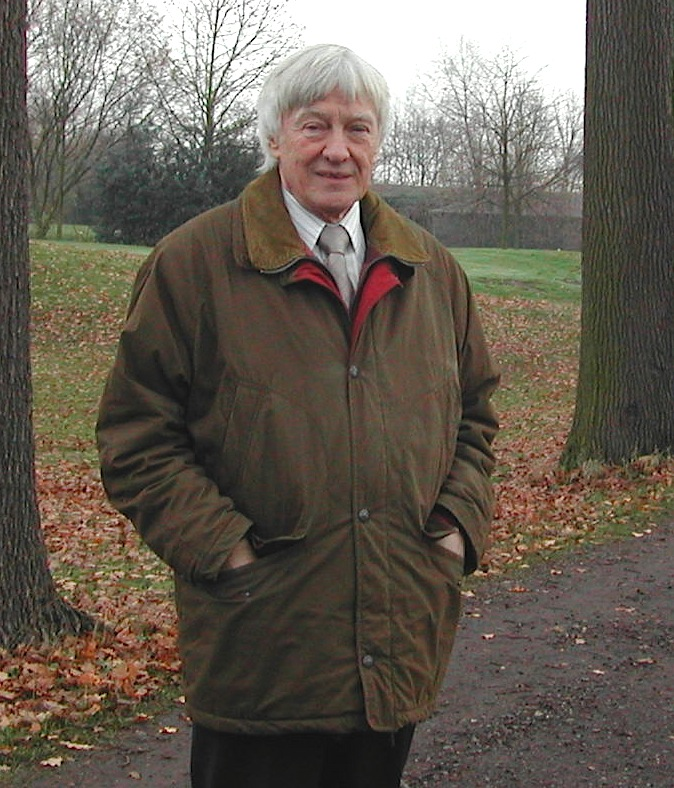
- Van de Wouwer, November 2003
- Born: 21 July 1933; Hoboken, Antwerp, Belgium
- Died: 22 October 2005 (aged 72); Wilrijk, Antwerp, Belgium
- Style: Surrealist painter

Roger Van de Wouwer (21 July 1933 – 22 October 2005) was a Belgian surrealist painter and illustrator.

== Biography ==
Roger Van de Wouwer (sometimes incorrectly : Roger Van de Wouver) was born on 21 July 1933 in Hoboken (Antwerp). At the age of 16, eager to become a photographer, he attended daytime drawing classes at the Royal Academy of Fine Arts Antwerp and evening courses at the " Vrije Nijverheids- en Beroepsschool", a school where technicians were trained for the Gevaert factory (now Agfa-Gevaert). He specialised in developing and producing photographic materials. After his military service, during which he had the opportunity to go to the Académie Royale des Beaux-Arts of Brussels, he was hired by the photoengraver De Schutter. In 1955 he was hired by Gevaert, where he stayed until his retirement. There he met Leo Dohmen, a great disciple of surrealism, who introduced him to Gilbert Senecaut, who in turn introduced him to Tom Gutt. These three encounters were critical for the young painter.

Roger Van de Wouwer's first solo exhibition took place in 1963 in the Library-Gallery of Henri Mercier in Brussels, where several paintings (Galathée, L'incorruptible) created a scandal and led to legal complaints. Tom Gutt reacted by writing a pamphlet in which he accurately described Roger Van de Wouwer's creative mind. He wrote:

Roger van de Wouwer a ouvert à toute volée les portes qui protégeaient la routine. Il est des fracas gais à entendre. A peine si, autour des gonds, quelques débris subsistent. Chacune de ses toiles constitue une salve contre le déjà vu. Le défi le plus intense circule comme une flamme à travers sa peinture.

The pamphlet gathered about fifty signatures, but was not well received in France, even by the surrealist group, where some considered Galathée to be an insult to women.

Roger Van de Wouwer has often use artistic trends to his advantage, but sometimes preceded them. His picture Tableau reproduces the definition of the word “tableau” (painting) as it is found in the dictionary, long before conceptual art made it common practice. This is only one of the multiple ways he questioned the meaning and function of images. Hence, the work of Roger Van de Wouwer is related to the style of Marcel Duchamp and his ready-made art. However, it also in contradiction with them, namely when he reproduced, with his paintbrush and scrupulous precision, the enlarged picture of an electronic circuit (La Transmission de la pensée) or used images with intriguing scientific origins. At the beginning of his career, more than merely seducing the eyes, every painting forced the mind to think in a different way. Later, he painted series, bringing together on the canvas elements in which the distance in meaning intensifies the power of the image: the cycles of combustion engines together with Manneken Pis, erected members combined with various crosses, diagrams of modern physics embedded in alchemical symbols, etc. There are numerous paintings based on «le défi et la révolte» (challenge and rebellion), as recommended by Paul Nougé. One of these paintings can certainly be understood as a manifesto: it depicts a boxing glove coloured as if it were a painter's palette (La Décantation). Together with Gilles Brenta, Van de Wouwer created a series of paintings (Douaniers sans frontières) whose attraction lies in the complementarity of the painters, each completing half-paintings started by the other. This project, completed in 1995, was the last important work of Roger Van de Wouwer, who died 22 October 2005.

== Solo exhibitions ==
- 1963: Roger van de Wouwer, Librairie La Proue, Brussels (25 May - 13 June). Text signed Ossip-Lourié.
- 1965: Roger van de Wouwer, Cogeime s.a., Brussels (13 May - 24 May).
- 1966: Roger van de Wouwer, presentation of some works, gallery Onze Schilders, Ostend (1 Juli entire summer).
- 1968: Roger van de Wouwer, Galerie 44, Brussels (2 May - 31 May). Preface by Tom Gutt: La Main souveraine.
- 1969: Roger van de Wouwer, Galerie GEBO, Antwerp (25 April - 6 May). Preface by Louis Scutenaire: Chef d'œuvre. On this occasion, presentation of Il est toujours trop tard 1924 - 1928 by Louis Scutenaire, illustrated by Roger Van de Wouwer.
- 1969: Op-o-mobiles, The Gallery Club, Albert Plage (Knokke) (31 October - 7 January 1970). Prefaced by Louis Scutenaire: Madame, disait Juve, allez rejoindre Fantômas, and Jan Cremer: Mysterie of Komplot.
- 1972: Roger van de Wouwer, Œuvres récentes, Galerie Aquarius, Brussels (17 November - 7 December). Texts by Y. Bossut (Yves Bossut): L'horoscope d'un artisan de la terreur, Irine (Irène Hamoir): Une plante du genre réséda, L. Scutenaire: L'horrible vérité & Jeux faciles, T. Gutt: Le perce-yeux, M. Thyrion: Le retour de Roger Van de Wouwer.
- 1980: Roger van de Wouwer, Galerie La Marée, Brussels (19 April - 29 April). Preface by Tom Gutt.
- 1984: Roger van de Wouwer, Galerie La Marée, Brussels (25 February - 10 March). Texts by Jean Wallenborn: Un beau sujet, Louis Scutenaire, Marcel Mariën: L'ôtage à l'accent circonflexe, Irine, Tom Gutt:La bonne tenue.
- 1986: Roger van de Wouwer, Galerie Isy Brachot, Brussels (10 September - 11 October). Text by Tom Gutt: Écrit dans le genre contemporain.
- 1992: "roger van de wouwer", Antwerp Sailing Club, Antwerp (25 June - 26 July).
- 1995: Douaniers sans frontières, exhibition of the works in collaboration with Gilles Brenta, Scheldestraat, 32, Antwerp (11 March - 25 March).
- 1995: Le Moment agréable, exhibition of the works in collaboration with Gilles Brenta, Galerie La Marée, Brussels (1 April - 8 April).
- 2016 : Retrospectieve - Roger Van de Wouwer, Verbeke Foundation, Kemzeke (17 April - 30 October 2016).
- 2020: Roger Van de Wouwer L'incorruptible - De onkreukbare, Rouge-Cloitre, 1160 Brussels (31 January - 15 March).

== Collective exhibitions ==
- 1962: Presentation of the Revue Punt 5, Galerie Guy Dorekens, Antwerp (24 March - 29 March).
- 1962: Exposition internationale Fantasmagie, Galerie d'Art Jean Dols, Liège (31 March - 12 April): Bérénice showed.
- 1962: Fantasmagie sur le thème d'Uranus (IVe salon international), Galerie de la Madeleine, Brussel (van 11/05 tot 23/5): Le signe de Mars (sic) showed.
- 1962: Groepstentoonstelling, Galerie Guy Dorekens, Antwerp (16 June onwards).
- 1965: 51e Nationaal Salon voor Schone Kunsten, Ghent.
- 1966: Le Papier, Cogeime s.a., Brussels (3 May - 16 May).
- 1967: Le Papier II, Cogeime s.a., Brussels (11 April - 24 April).
- 1969: Introduction au surréalisme en Belgique, Salle communale, La Louvière (26 April - 11 May).
- 1969: Surréalisme pour ainsi dire, La Jeune Parque, Brussels (17 December - 10 January 1970).
- 1970: Surrealisme, Galerie GEBO, Antwerp (23 June - 10 July and 3 August - 28 August).
- 1977: La Contre-bande, Galerie La Marée, Brussels (25 March - 2 April).
- 1978: Menu, Galerie Florence (restaurant-galerie d'art), Brussels (10 June - 31 August).
- 1982: La Marée se retire, Galerie La Marée, Brussels (16 January - 23 January).
- 1983: Goden en idolen, De Warande, Turnhout (12 March - 10 April).
- 1984: Art et Sport, Musée des Beaux-Arts, Mons (23 March - 3 June).
- 1986: Le Surréalisme en Belgique I, Galerie Isy Brachot, Paris (16 April - 10 July).
- 1986: Arte e Alchimia, Venice Biennale (29 June - 28 September).
- 1990: Tire la langue: un pays d'irréguliers, Centre culturel du Botanique, Brussels (26 September - 11 November).
- 1991: Les Irréguliers du langage, Musée d'Art Contemporain, Dunkerque (3 May - 10 June).
- 1992: Woord en Beeld, MuHKA, Antwerp (27 June - 15 November).
- 1992: Les irréguliers du langage, Casa Museo Murillo, Sevilla (24 September - 29 November).
- 1992: Hommage à Michel Thyrion, Librairie Crucis, Brussels (20 November - 9 December).
- 1993: Les irréguliers du langage, Commissariat aux Relations internationales de la communauté française de Belgique, travelling version with 80 panels with reproductions.
- 1995: Paul Nougé, Maison du Spectacle La Bellone, Brussels (14 February - 15 April).
- 1995: Le Surréalisme en Belgique, Espace Sculfort, Maubeuge (17 November - 7 January 1996).
- 1996: « Ce qui est attirant est beau », Irène, Scutenaire, Magritte and Co Royal Museums of Fine Arts of Belgium, Brussels, (13 September - 15 December).
- 1998: Les affinités suffisantes, Musée Ianchelevici, La Louvière (19 September - 25 October).
- 2004: Le Surréalisme en Belgique, National Museum of Art of Romania, Bucharest (7 October - 5 December).
- 2006: Arts et Sciences, scientific exhibition, Maison de la Science, Liege (8 May - 30 October)
- 2007: Le Surréalisme en Belgique 1924-2000, BAM, Mons (18 March - 19 August)
- 2010: Collages@Romantiek, Galerie Alfons Blomme & former National Bank, Roeselare (6 February - 28 February).
- 2010: Deurnroosje, exhibition in shop-windows, Turnhoutsebaan, Deurne (18 August - 22 August).
- 2011: Oh Crisis 2.0, Huize Frankendael, Amsterdam (28 March - 28 May).
- 2012: Un abécédaire pour La Louvière, Centre de la Gravure et de l'Image imprimée, La Louvière (29 September - 6 January 2013)
- 2014: Abécédaire du surréalisme , Centre Wallonie-Bruxelles, Paris (6 February - 6 April).
- 2015: The Discreet Charm of the Bourgeoisie, Surrealism in Belgium, The Baker Museum, Naples, Florida, USA (31 January - 3 May).
- 2017: Collages & Assemblages (Book release - illustrated), Verbeke Foundation, Kemzeke (23 April - 30 October).
- 2018: Imaginaire et Figuration dans l'art du Collage, Centre d’Art de Rouge-Cloître, Brussels (8 June - 22 July).
- 2019: Magische collages, Stedelijk Museum Schiedam, (19 October 2019 - 19 January 2020).
- 2019: Surrealism in Knokke, Gallerij Ronny Van de Velde, (15 December - 1 January 2020).
- 2022: Sans dieu, sans maître, sans roi et sans droits, Verbeke Foundation, (12 June - June 2023).
- 2023: Le mal du Pays, Galerij Rossaert - Ronny Van de Velde, (21 January - 26 March 2023).
- 2023: Wintertentoonstelling Verbeke Foundation, Kemzeke (19 November 2023 - 28 April 2024).
- 2024: Histoire à ne pas rire Centre for Fine Arts, Brussels, (21 February - 16 June 2024).
- 2024: Surréalisme : Bouleverser le réel BAM Mons (19 October - 16 February 2025).
- 2024: Wintertentoonstelling, Verbeke Foundation, Kemzeke (17 November 2024 - 20 April 2025).
- 2024 fête surréaliste - Un clin d’oeil au surréalisme à Anvers – Berchem Campo & Campo (13 November -18 January 2025).
- 2025 Magritte.La ligne de vie, Royal Museum of Fine Arts Antwerp , Antwerp (15 November 2025 - 22 February 2026).

== Individual publications ==
- Un Conte de Fées, Berchem-Antwerpen, Les Editions de la Serfouette, 1967 (21 drawings) with images of paintings. Preface & afterword of Gilbert Senecaut (Faites vos jeux! - Rien ne va plus!).
- J'ai montré quelquefois ce que l'homme croit voir, Berchem-Antwerpen, Les Editions de la Serfouette, 1968 (1 drawing accompanied by two texts of Claudine and Tom Gutt).
- Deux farceurs (in collaboration with Yves Bossut), s.l., s.d. (c. 1969).
- Les croisades, Brussels, Le Vocatif, n° 2, November 1972 (6 drawings).
- Untitled, Brussels, Le Vocatif, n° spécial, November 1972 (on the occasion of the exhibition in the galery Aquarius) (6 drawings).
- Untitled, Brussels, Le Vocatif, n° 57, March 1974 (6 drawings).
- Untitled, Brussels, Le Vocatif, n° 102, February 1976 (6 drawings).
- Conchyliologies, Brussels, Le Vocatif, n° 135, June 1977 (4 drawings).
- Untitled, Frassem-Arlon, Le Bon Plaisir, 1st series, without n°, 30 November 1985 (1 drawing).
- Douaniers sans frontières, in collaboration with Gilles Brenta (two books with 12 drawings each), Brussels, Une passerelle en papier, 1995.

== Illustrations ==
- Tom Gutt, Ambages, s.l., 1967 (1 drawing).
- Gilbert Senecaut, On ne change pas d'épaule un fusil à deux coups, Brussels, collection "Une passerelle en papier", 1968 (2 drawings).
- Louis Scutenaire, Il est toujours trop tard 1924 - 1928, 10 engravings of Roger van de Wouwer, Berchem-Antwerpen Les Editions de la Serfouette, 1969.
- Tom Gutt, L'ordre alphabétique, Brussels, 1970 (12 drawings).
- Louis Scutenaire, Mes Inscriptions 1945 - 1963, Brussels, 1976 (one of the 15 engravings of the 120 deluxe copies).
- Gilbert Senecaut, Livraison sans domicile précédé de A dessein dessin et demi, Brussels, Brassa, 1980 (29 drawings).
- Louis Scutenaire, La Citerne, Brussels, Brassa, 1987 (portrait of the author in ink).
- Henri Pastoureau, Le cycle de Berlin, Brussels, Une passerelle en papier, 1988 (2 drawings).
- André Thirion, Portrait d'André Breton suivi de Bavardages et Parodies, Brussels, 1989 (reproduction of the portrait of André Breton).
- Michel Thyrion, L'imagination du chien, Brussels, Une passerelle en papier, 1996 (9 drawings).
- Jacques Wergifosse, Variations sur un thème, Brussels, 2001 (portrait of the author in ink).
- Jacques Wergifosse, Troisième chanson perdue, Brussels, Collection La Chanson perdue, 2001 (1 drawing).
- Tom Gutt, Jean Wallenborn, La porte ouverte est fermée, Les Editions de Furfooz, 2015 (1 drawing).

== Films ==
- About Roger Van de Wouwer:

A bout portant, a film bout Roger Van de Wouwer, directed by Claude François, written by Jean Wallenborn and Claude François, produced by PBC Pictures, Ambiances asbl, RTBF/Unité Documentaire, with support of the Centre du Cinéma et de l'Audiovisuel de la Communauté Française de Belgique and the Walloon distributors (2006).

- Mentioning Roger Van de Wouwer:

Le Désordre alphabétique, a film about surrealism in Belgium, written and directed by Claude François, produced by Image Création (2012).

== Bibliography ==
- C.E. [Chiara Elefante], Roger van de Wouwer (Hoboken(Antwerp - Belgium) 1933), L'Auberge espagnole in Arlecchino senza Mantello, s.l.d. Ruggero Campagnoli and Marc Quaghebeur, Rimini, Panozzo Editore, 1993 (with one reproduction).
- Frederik Leen, in Irène, Scut, Magritte and Co, Brussels, Royal Museums of Fine Arts of Belgium, 1996 (with 3 reproductions).
- Xavier Canonne in catalogue of Le Surrealisme en Belgique, Musée National d'Art de Roumanie - Communauté française de Belgique-MNaR, 2004.
- Jean Wallenborn, La violence tranquille, Paris, Infosurr, n° 66, November–December 2005 (with 1 drawing).
- Xavier Canonne in Catalogue of Le Surréalisme en Belgique 1924-2000, Mons, BAM, 2007.
- Jean Wallenborn, Roger Van de Wouwer L'incorruptible, Kemzeke, Verbeke Foundation, 2016 (illustrated).
- José Miguel Pérez Corrales, Caleidoscopio surrealista, Tenerife, La Pagina Ediciones, 2017.
- Desmond Morris, The Surrealist Menagerie, London, Thames and Hudson, 2026.
