= Rachel Baes =

Belgian artist (1912–1983)

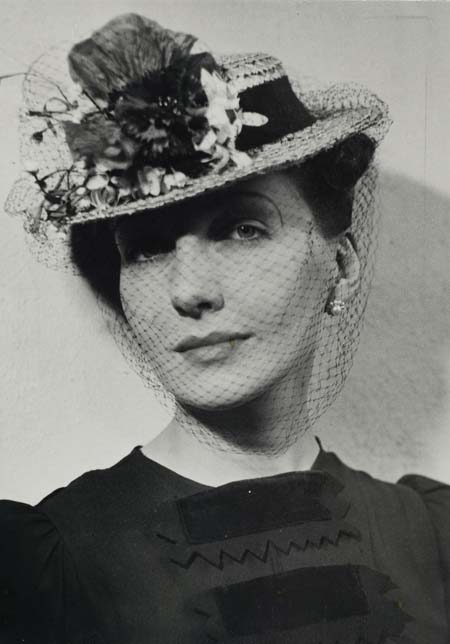
Portrait of Rachel Baes

Rachel Baes (1 August 1912 – 8 June 1983) was a Belgian surrealist painter. The growth of the women's movement in the late 20th century led to renewed interest in female artists and brought greater appreciation of their work. In 2002 the Royal Museum of Fine Arts Antwerp dedicated an exhibition to Baes and the female French-Belgian surrealist painter Jane Graverol.

== Early life and education ==
Baes was born on 1 August 1912 in Brussels to the painter, writer and art historian Émile Baes and his wife. Her father was a successful artist who was mainly known for his eroticized female nudes executed in a late Impressionist style. Rachel Baes was encouraged in her artistic efforts from an early age, although she never studied art formally.

== Career ==
In 1929, at age 17, Baes achieved her first recognition as an artist when she exhibited works at the Salon des Indépendants in Paris. There she was one of the members of the Surrealist group around René Magritte. She came to know André Breton, Jean Cocteau, Max Ernst, Georges Bataille, Irène Hamoir, and Paul Éluard.

Between 1936 and 1940, Baes had an affair with Joris Van Severen, the leader of Verdinaso, a far-right political party in Belgium. On the morning of the invasion of Belgium by German troops on 10 May 1940 Van Severen was arrested together with a number of other persons who were considered a danger to Belgium's national security. The arrested men were handed over to the French Army and incarcerated near Abbeville in France. On 20 May 1940, when the advancing German Army cut off the area, a group of French soldiers killed a number of the Belgian prisoners under their care including Van Severen, an event remembered as the Abbeville massacre. Baes published in 1965 a biography of Van Severen under the title Joris Van Severen, une âme.

From 1962, Baes retired from public life and lived alone in Huize 't Haentje, now known as Hotel Malleberg, in Bruges where she painted local subjects. She died in Bruges and was buried in Abbeville, alongside Van Severen.
