= Le Surrealisme au service de la revolution =

Periodical issued by the Surrealist Group in Paris, France, from 1930 to 1933

Le Surréalisme au service de la révolution ("Surrealism in the service of the revolution") was a periodical issued by the Surrealist Group in Paris between 1930 and 1933. It was the successor of La Révolution surréaliste (published 1924–29) and preceded the primarily surrealist publication Minotaure (1933 to 1939).

After the writing of his Second Manifesto of Surrealism (1929), which announced the expulsions of several prior surrealists due to theoretical differences, André Breton and his supporters developed a new, more politically charged publication. The first issue of Le Surréalisme au service de la révolution was published in June 1930, and was followed by five more issues through 1933. Contributors included André Breton, Paul Éluard, René Crevel, Tristan Tzara, Salvador Dalí, René Char, Benjamin Péret, Louis Aragon, and Luis Buñuel, among others.

== Selected issues ==
Issue 1 features writings by Breton, Éluard, Crevel, Tzara, Dalí, Char, Péret, and Aragon, and others. Illustrations include stills from Buñuel's film L'Âge d'or, paintings by Dalí, and a drawing of the Russian poet Vladimir Mayakovsky with a skeleton. It was originally published in June 1930.

Issue 2 features writings by Breton, Éluard, Crevel, Char, Péret, Marcel Duchamp, Aragon, and Georges Sadoul, and others. Illustrations include paintings by Dalí and Yves Tanguy, and a photograph by Man Ray. The issue opens with an ad for Breton's First and Second Manifeste du Surrealisme, and ads for two Paris art galleries. It was originally published in October 1930.

Issue 3 features writings by Breton, Éluard, Char, Tanguy, Max Ernst, Pierre Unik, Crevel, and Aragon, and others. Illustrations include photographs of surrealist objects by Breton, Gala Éluard, Valentine Hugo, Joan Miró, Alberto Giacometti, and Dalí. The issue opens with an ad for the books L'Immaculee conception by Breton & Eluard, La Peinture au defi by Aragon, and La Femme Visible by Dalí. It was originally published in December 1931.

Issue 4 features writings by Breton, Éluard, Char, Tzara, Dalí, Pierre Unik, Crevel, and Aragon, and others. Illustrations include a collage by Ernst, and paintings by Tanguy and Dalí. The issue opens with an ad for several books by Dalí. It was originally published in December 1931.

Issue 5 features writings by Breton, Éluard, Duchamp, Dalí, Pierre Unik, Paul Nouge, Simone (alternatively spelled as Symone) Yoyotte Monnerot and Aragon, and others. Illustrations include works by Duchamp, Dalí, Hugo, Ernst, and Man Ray. The issue opens with ads for numerous surrealist books by Péret, Tzara, Breton, Dalí, and Crevel, as well as publications by Achim D'Arnim and Lautreamont. There is also promotion of a major exhibit of surrealist art. It was originally published in May 1933.

Issue 6 features writings by Breton, Buñuel, Char, Tzara, and Péret, and others. André Thirion introduced translated excerpts from Lenin's Philosophical Notebooks on Hegel. Illustrations include works by Giacometti, René Magritte, Ernst, Breton, Hugo, Dalí, and Tanguy. The issue opens with an ad for the next surrealist periodical Minotaure. It was originally published in May 1933.

== See also ==
- Acéphale, a surrealist review created by Georges Bataille, published from 1936 to 1939
- Documents, a surrealist journal edited by Bataille from 1929 to 1930
- View, an American art magazine, primarily covering avant-garde and surrealist art, published from 1940 to 1947
- VVV, a New York City journal published by émigré European surrealists from 1942 through 1944
