= Jane Graverol =

Belgian painter (1905–1984)

Jane Graverol (1905–1984) was a Belgian surrealist painter of French extraction.

== Life ==
Jane Graverol was born in Ixelles on 18 December 1905 to Alexandre Graverol and Anne-Marie Lagadec. After a traditional education, she enrolled in the Brussels Académie Royale des Beaux-Arts in 1921, where she was taught by Jean Delville and Constant Montald. She started painting between 1920 and 1930; this was before the rise of surrealism, and before she adapted the style she is known for today. Her works from that time bear the stamp of symbolism. She began to exhibit her work in 1927. Between 1960 and 1970, when the popularity of surrealism decreased, she mainly painted compositions focusing on subjects like war and violence. This is also when she painted her flora and fauna works.

During the last twenty years of her life, she was the companion of Gaston Ferdière. She died in Fontainebleau on 24 April 1984.

== Works ==
Graverol was closely linked to the development of surrealism in Belgium. She would progressively consider her canvases to be "waking, conscious dreams". Her encounters after the war with René Magritte, Louis Scutenaire, Paul Nougé, and then Marcel Mariën, with whom she collaborated on the periodical Les Lèvres nues, merely reconfirmed her in her beliefs. Her painting La Goutte d'eau is a collective portrait of the Belgian surrealists. She offered an original, dreamy version of feminine sensibility in painting, served by a figurative technique that was both precise and cold.

== Legacy ==
In 2018, Graverol was mentioned in a short documentary of Gloria Feman Orenstein by Cheri Gaulke, Gloria's Call.
