= Irène Hamoir =

Belgian writer (1906–1994)

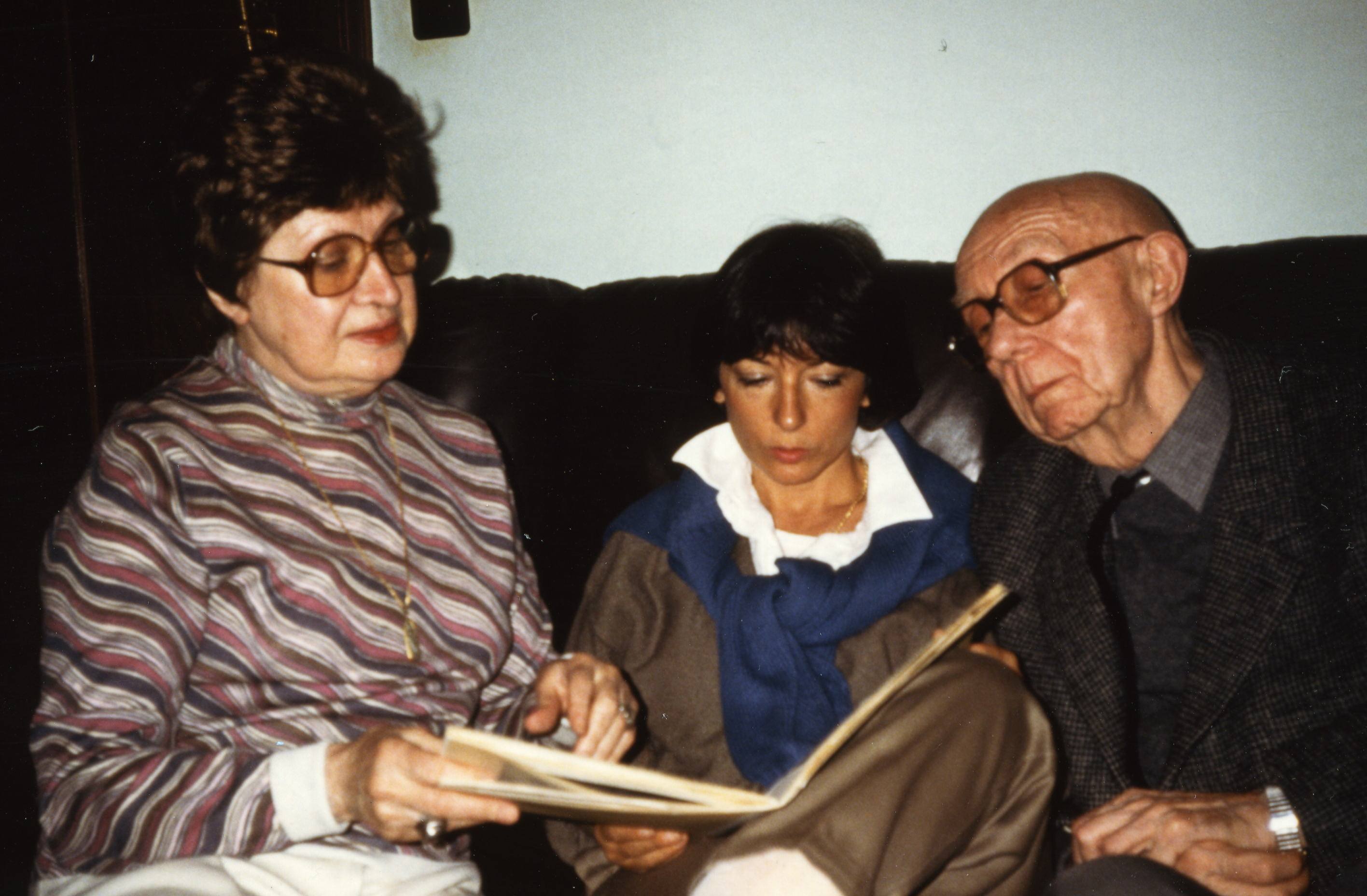
- Irène Hamoir, left, and Louis Scutenaire, right, in 1985
- Born: 25 July 1906; Saint-Gilles, Belgium
- Died: 17 May 1994 (aged 87); Watermael-Boitsfort, Belgium

Irène Hamoir (25 July 1906 – 17 May 1994) was a Belgian novelist and poet, the leading female member of the Belgian surrealist movement. Her poetry was published under the pen name Irine, and she appeared as Lorrie in the writings of her husband, Louis Scutenaire, and the works of René Magritte.

== Biography ==
Born in Saint-Gilles, Belgium into a family with ties to the circus, she worked as a secretary. As an adolescent, Hamoir was already militant in the Young Socialist Guards. Then in 1928, she met the Brussels surrealists (she would later portray them in rough outline as hooligans in her novel Boulevard Jacqmain [1953]; reprinted in 1996 by the Éditions Devillez). She wrote her first poem, Métallique in 1925. At that time she first became involved with the burgeoning Belgian surrealist group forming around artists such as Magritte, Marc. Eemans, Scutenaire, Marcel Mariën, and Paul Nougé. She married Louis Scutenaire in 1930. Her poems and tales, highly fantastical, were first collected in 1949 in a thin volume with a print run of 200 copies under the pseudonym Irine; in 1976, the collection Corne de brune featured her contributions to periodicals and collective works, as well as the prefaces she wrote for her friends: this volume would enable one to better appreciate her humor.

After Scutenaire's death in 1987, she published her recollections of their life together as Ma vie avec Scut. She died in Watermael-Boitsfort in 1994.

Irène Harmoir legated the Belgium Museum of Fine Art with surrealistic works, such as these by Marc.

== Selected works ==
=== Poetry ===
- (in French) Œuvre poétique (1930–1945), [published under the pen name Irine]. Saint-Generou près Saint Julien de Voventes: Maître François, 1949.
- (in French) Ithos, [published anonymously], ill. Claudine Jamagne. Leyden: 1971.
- (in French) L'Orichalcienne. La Louvière: Daily Bul, 1972.
- (in French) Corne de brune (1925–1976), ills René Magritte, Rachel Baes, Danielle, Jane Graverol & Claudine Jamagne. Brussels: Isy Brachot et Tom Gutt, 1976.
- (in French) Le Comparse en fleurs et des aigrelettes. Paris: Éditions de l'Orycte, 1977.

=== Prose ===
- (in French) La Cuve infernale. Brussels: Editions Lumière, 1944.
- (in French) Boulevard Jacqmain. reprinted Brussels: Didier Devillez, 1996.
- (in French) La Cuve infernale, Nouvelles, édition augmentée. Brussels: Editions Brassa, 1987.
- (in French) Question à une tourterelle turque. Brussels: 1989.
- (in French) Croquis de rue. Bassac: Plein Chant, 1992.

== Sources ==
- Dewandeleer, Cécile, "HAMOIR, Irène..." in E. Gubin, C. Jacques, V. Piette & J. Puissant (eds), Dictionnaire des femmes belges: XIX^{e} et XX^{e} siècles. Bruxelles: Éditions Racine, 2006. ISBN 2-87386-434-6
