= André Thirion =

French Surrealist writer

- Born: 17 July 1907; Baccarat (Meurthe-et-Moselle)
- Died: 4 January 2001 (aged 93); Levallois-Perret, France
- Occupations: Writer; Leftist activist

André Thirion (14 July 1907 – 4 January 2001) was a French writer, a member of the group of surrealists, a theorist and political activist.

== Biography ==
After becoming a trade unionist, he turned to communism, a party he joined in 1925. His character led him to the group of surrealists he joined in 1928. A friend of Louis Aragon and Georges Sadoul, he participated in the activities of the Surrealists between 1928 and 1934. His photograph composes the framework of the work of René Magritte, Je ne vois pas la [femme] cachée dans la forêt (1928); He appears in tenth position, starting in a clockwise direction from the upper left corner. In November 1930, with André Breton, he draught the statutes of the "A.A.E.R." (Association des artistes et écrivains révolutionnaires) which the French Communist Party took over in 1932, changing the acronym to "A.E.A.R." and excluding the surrealists.

Published in 1972, under the title Révolutionnaires sans révolution, his testimony constantly "doubles as a critical commentary which revives surrealist thought while at the same time correcting its illusions". He participated to the magazine Le Surrealisme au service de la revolution, supported the film L'Âge d'or by Luis Buñuel and Salvador Dalí. He moved away from communism during the 1930s. He campaigned against Aragon during his departure from Surrealism to the French Communist Party in 1932.

During the Second World War, he incorporated the Gaullist resistance and became an MP for the Rassemblement du peuple français at the Liberation of France.

== Work ==
His work is divided into two groups: the first consists of autobiographical works; The other of political and erotic novels. Révolutionnaires sans revolution is the main work of the first group. It is an autobiography that relates this period and analyzes the group of surrealists.

=== Autobiographical texts ===
- 1972: Révolutionnaires sans révolution, (Prix Roger Nimier)
- 1987: Révisions déchirantes

=== Novels ===
- 1934 Le Grand Ordinaire
- 1975: Béatrice

=== Short stories ===
- 1993: Œdipe au bordel, suivi d'autres contes inconvenants et fantasques

=== Theatre ===
- 1976: Défense de : divertissement en 42 scènes
- 1988: L'Ange et les Homards

=== Other publications ===
- 1953: L'Automne sur la mer
- 1975: Les éboueurs ne sont plus en grève
- 1973: Éloge de l'indocilité
- 1981: Le Vocatif
- 1983: Le Charme éprouvée de la bourgeoisie : à propos d'Aragon
- 1989: Portrait d'André Breton suivi de Bavardages et Parodies, Brussels, (with reproduction of the portrait of André Breton by Roger Van de Wouwer).

== Bibliography ==
- Biro, Adam; Passeron, René. Dictionnaire général du surréalisme et de ses environs. Fribourg (Suisse): Office du livre. Biro.
- Bonnet. A. Breton, œuvres complètes. Vol. 1, chronologie. Bonnet.
