= Valentine Hugo =

French painter, draftsman, and illustrator (1887–1968)

- Born: Valentine Gross; 16 March 1887; Boulogne-sur-Mer, France
- Died: 1968 (aged 80–81); Paris, France
- Known for: Illustration
- Movement: Surrealism
- Spouse: Jean Hugo (m. 1919, divorced)

Valentine Hugo (French pronunciation: [valɑ̃tin yɡo]; 1887–1968) was a French artist and writer. She was born Valentine Marie Augustine Gross, only daughter to Auguste Gross and Zélie Démelin, in Boulogne-sur-Mer. She is best known for her work with the Russian ballet and with the French Surrealists. Hugo died in Paris.

== Early life and education ==
A lover of the theater and music, Hugo's father raised her to share his interests until his death in 1903, which was undetermined as suicide or an accident. After her husband's death, Zélie raised her daughter alone.

Valentine Hugo received schooling in Boulogne-sur-Mer, where she received multiple awards for accomplishments in drawing, until 1907, at which time she entered the L'École des Beaux-Arts in Paris. There she worked in the studio at the Académie Humbert and exhibited in the Salon of French artists in 1909, and again in 1911. In 1908, Valentine Hugo met the artist Edmond Aman-Jean, who painted her portrait in 1909 and encouraged Hugo's artistic pursuits.

== Work with the Ballets Russes ==
Hugo's work with the Ballets Russes established her connection with Jean Cocteau, who would introduce her to several important figures in her life, including her future husband French artist Jean Hugo (1894–1984), great-grandson of Victor Hugo. She would collaborate with him on ballet designs including Les mariés de la tour Eiffel (1921), and in 1926 she executed 24 wood engravings after maquettes by Jean Hugo for Jean Cocteau's production of Roméo et Juliette. Her involvement with the ballets provided Hugo many opportunities to progress her artwork. She often drew sketches of the ballets' choreography, and had a particular fascination with dancer and choreographer Vaslav Nijinsky. In 1913 she exhibited her paintings at the Théâtre des Champs-Elysées during the premiere of The Rite of Spring.

Hugo and Cocteau collaborated to create the ballet Parade, which premiered on 18 May 1917. Hugo worked on several other of Satie's ballets, including Le Piège de Méduse, Socrate, and Mercure.

Hugo hosted salons with many artists, writers, and musicians in Paris, including avant-garde leaders such as Pablo Picasso, André Breton, and Paul Éluard. She would often sketch her visitors, foreshadowing her portraiture work of the Surrealist leaders later on.

== Valentine and the Surrealists ==
Hugo met Breton in 1917, before the start of Surrealism, at one of Cocteau's readings. Her friendships with Breton and Eluard would keep her connected to the Surrealists as the movement developed, and help her to form connections with other members, such as Salvador Dalí and Max Ernst. The three often traveled together, along with other members of the movement, in 1931 and 1932. As the only member of the group who owned a vehicle, Hugo would drive her companions to their destinations.

Valentine and Jean began living apart in 1926, and eventually divorced in 1932. Her separation from her husband allowed Hugo greater freedom to be involved with the Surrealist group. She moved into the same building as Eluard and Breton in May 1932.

Hugo joined the Bureau of Surrealist Research and created the Objet à fonctionnement symbolique (1931), which was shown during the Exposition surréalistic in 1933. She took part in other exhibitions throughout her time with the group, including an exhibit at the Museum of Modern Art in 1936.

=== Valentine and the Exquisite Corpse ===
Hugo participated in the exquisite corpse game practiced by the Surrealists, collaborating on drawings with Breton, Eluard, and many others. These drawings have an illusionist quality credited to Hugo's participation. She introduced new mediums to the practice, as the drawings she participated in used gouache on black paper.

=== Relationship with Breton ===
Hugo's relationship with Breton turned physical for a brief period between approximately July 1931 and May 1932. It was a tumultuous affair, and ended negatively for Hugo. On 8 May 1932, following a fight with Breton, Hugo attempted suicide. Regretting her actions, she called Eluard with enough time for him to arrive and save her life. Following this event, Breton and Hugo's friendship remained strained until 9 September of that year, when Hugo punched Breton. Their association permanently ended at this point, except for interactions during group meetings of the Surrealists. Breton never mentioned Hugo in his book Le Surréalisme et la Peinture.

== Later years ==
In 1943, Hugo's work was included in Peggy Guggenheim's show Exhibition by 31 Women at the Art of This Century gallery in New York. After the war, she went back to stage design for choreography, while continuing to create her paintings "in secret," saving "the haunting element of surprise and chance for the end." In 1948, she completed the portrait of Picasso she had started in 1934.

Hugo died on 16 March 1968, the date of her 81st birthday.

== Illustrations ==
Hugo was primarily known for her drawings, where a fine line against a dark background created and abundance of decorative volutes and superimposed elements. Her portraits of the leading surrealists and her illustrations for texts by Rene Char and Paul Eluard and for the edition of Achim von Arnim's Strange Tales prefaced by Breton in 1933 are particularly interesting. The foremost illustrator of Paul Éluard's work, she first exhibited with the surrealists in the Salon des Surindépendants of 1933.

Several of her illustrations are:

- Comte de Lautréamont's Les Chants de Maldoror (1933)
- Achim von Arnim's Contes bizarres (1933)
- Arthur Rimbaud's Les Poètes de sept ans (1938)
- Paul Éluard's Les Animaux et leurs hommes (1937)
- Roger Peyrefitte's Les amitiés particulières (1946)

== Exhibitions ==
A retrospective exhibition of her work was held at the Centre Culturel Thibaud de Champagne, Troyes, in 1977.

Other exhibitions of her work have been at: Tenerife (1935), Copenhagen (1935), New York (1937), Tokyo (1937).
