= Marcel Lecomte =

Belgian writer (1900–1966)

- Born: 25 September 1900; Saint-Gilles, Belgium
- Died: 19 November 1966 (aged 66); Brussels, Belgium
- Occupation: writer

Marcel Lecomte (25 September 1900, Saint-Gilles (Brussels) – 19 November 1966, Brussels) was a Belgian writer, member of the Belgian surrealist movement. In 1918 he was introduced to dadaism and Eastern philosophy by Clément Pansaers. He also started to study literature and philosophy at the Université libre de Bruxelles that year, but he left the studies in 1920.

In 1922, he published the highly acclaimed Demonstrations, his first collection of poetry. In 1924 he founded a group named Correspondence with Paul Nougé and Camille Goemans from which he was excommunicated the following year; however, they became close again thanks to common interest in surrealism. Yet he was not a strict surrealist, being more interested in the metaphysics of the dailiness. The same year he was excluded from the group, Lecomte published his second book of poetry entitled Applications. The work featured two illustrations from his friend René Magritte. Magritte's growing interest in Surrealism maybe have begun with Lecomte. The artist often recounted the moment Lecomte took him to view a reproduction of Giorgio de Chirico's The Song of Love as a moment when he uncontrollably wept. Lecomte also inspired a number of Magritte's paintings and was portrayed in his "Souvenir de Voyage" ("In Memory of a Journey", 1955).

Between 1934 and 1945 he was a teacher at a secondary school. While he continued to write poetry, Lecomte focused on critical work and reviews of art, philosophy and poetry, writing for a variety of newspapers, including a weekly column in La Laterne. From 1958, he also worked as a counsellor for the Brussels´ Museum of Art.

In 2013, University of Maryland doctoral student K. A. Wisniewski began translating selected poems by Lecomte into English. These poems have appeared in the Chariton Review at Truman State University and basalt from the Eastern Oregon University.

== Bibliography ==
- Démonstrations, 1922
- Applications, illustrated by René Magritte, 1925
- L'Homme au complet gris clair, 1931
- Les Minutes insolites [dix récits], 1936
- Lucide, 1939
- La Servante au miroir, 1941
- Le Règne de la lenteur, 1943
- Rencontre dans Paris, illustrated by Raoul Ubac, 1944
- L'Accent du secret, 1944
- L'Œuvre de Suzanne Van Damme, 1946
- Rachel Baes, 1947
- Le Sens des tarots, illustrated by Pierre Alechinsky, 1948
- D'un nouvel espace, 1956
- Univers et signes de Rem, 1957
- Le Carnet et les instants, preface by Jean Paulhan, 1964
- Le Cœur et la main, illustrated by Jane Graverol, 1968
- Le Sens de la vie, illustrated by René Magritte, 1968
- Le Suspens, 1971
- Œuvres (L'Homme au complet gris clair. La Servante au miroir. Le Carnet et les instants), 1980
- Les Minutes insolites, note by Jean Paulhan, 1981
- Les Voies de la littérature. Choix de chroniques littéraires suivi d'une bibliographie établis par Philippe Dewolf, coll. "Archives du Futur", 1988
- Le Regard des choses. Choix de chroniques artistiques et de préfaces d'expositions établi et annoté par Philippe Dewolf, coll. "Archives du Futur", 1992
- Comment j'ai entendu une jolie fille se faire dresser par un spécialiste suivi de Le jeune Gérard, 1995
