= Bureau of Surrealist Research =

- Centrale Surréaliste
- Formation: 11 October 1924
- Founder: Antonin Artaud, André Breton
- Dissolved: 1925
- Purpose: Surrealist research, public engagement
- Location: 15 Rue de Grenelle, Paris, France
- Official language: French

The Bureau of Surrealist Research, also known as the Centrale Surréaliste or Bureau of Surrealist Enquiries, was a Paris-based office in which a loosely affiliated group of Surrealist writers and artists gathered to meet, hold discussions, and conduct interviews in order to "gather all the information possible related to forms that might express the unconscious activity of the mind." Located at 15 Rue de Grenelle, it opened on 11 October 1924 under the direction of Antonin Artaud, just four days before the publication of the first Surrealist Manifesto by André Breton.

== Purpose ==
According to art critic Sarane Alexandrian, the public at large was invited to bring to the Bureau "accounts of dreams or of coincidences, ideas on fashion or politics, or inventions, so as to contribute to the 'formation of genuine surrealist archives'." It was intended as a resource, to "unite all those who are interested in expression where thought is freed from any intellectual preoccupations; . . . all those who are closely or remotely concerned with surrealism will find all the information and documentation relative to the Mouvement surréaliste."

== Organization ==
Gérard Durozoi describes the Bureau in his book, History of the Surrealist Movement: "The bureau was [...] organized in such a way that a daily presence was assured by two people, who were responsible for greeting visitors (journalists, writers, onlookers, even students) and for taking note of their suggestions and reactions in a daily "Notebook"; the office would also guarantee a regular amount of daily publicity for the movement (press relations, various mailings), while in another room, on the first floor, other members of the group could meet for discussions, or exchange ideas and projects, or work on their own texts, or help to edit the first issue of La Révolution surréaliste."

== Significance ==
One of the more significant contributions of the Bureau was its implicit idea that Surrealism was not to be contained under the category of the aesthetic. An assumption of the Bureau was that Surrealism could be a mode of research, and could produce knowledge on a par with the knowledge produced by scientific researchers. According to Anna Balakian, André Breton's biographer, the Bureau "was supposed to implement the theory that surrealism resembled scientific investigation and promoted experimentation in the field of psychology and linguistics. Unfortunately, although people from various parts of Europe sought out the research center, it also attracted crackpots and became the locus of many belligerent confrontations."

== Legacy ==
A similarly conceived institute in Amsterdam existed bearing the name until at least 1970.
