= List of films influenced by the Surrealist movement =

Surrealism was a cultural movement which began in the early 1920s. Well known for artwork and writing produced by group members, it also influenced the medium of film. Surrealist films include Un chien andalou and L'Âge d'Or by Luis Buñuel and Dalí; Buñuel went on to direct many more films, with varying degrees of surrealist influence.

== Modern films influenced by surrealism ==
The animated films of Isao Takahata began to have broad international influence in the 1970s. Experimental works by the anime production company Gainax tend to contain surreal elements, notably Hideaki Anno's movie The End of Evangelion. Angel's Egg, produced by Mamoru Oshii and artist Yoshitaka Amano, is perhaps the most notable example of surrealist influence in anime.

=== American directors ===
David Lynch (Eraserhead, Blue Velvet, Lost Highway, Mulholland Drive, and Inland Empire)

=== Canadian directors ===
Denis Villeneuve (Enemy)

Guy Maddin (Cowards Bend the Knee, The Saddest Music in the World, Brand Upon the Brain, My Winnipeg)

=== Eastern European directors ===
- Wojciech Has (The Saragossa Manuscript and The Hourglass Sanatorium)

=== New Asian directors ===
- Kim Ki-duk (Spring, Summer, Fall, Winter... and Spring, Real Fiction, Time, 3-Iron, Breath, Dream)

== See also ==
- New French Extremity
