= La Révolution surréaliste =

French surrealist publication (1924–1929)

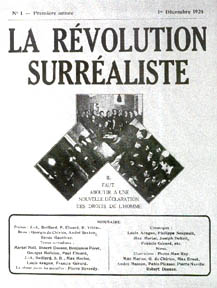
Cover of the first issue of La Révolution surréaliste, December 1924.

La Révolution surréaliste (English: The Surrealist Revolution) was a publication by the Surrealists in Paris. Twelve issues were published between 1924 and 1929.

Shortly after releasing the first Surrealist Manifesto, André Breton published the inaugural issue of La Révolution surréaliste on December 1, 1924.

Pierre Naville and Benjamin Péret were the initial directors of the publication and modeled the format of the journal on the conservative scientific review La Nature. The format was deceiving, and to the Surrealists' delight, La Révolution surréaliste was consistently scandalous and revolutionary. The journal focused on writing with most pages densely packed with columns of text, but also included reproductions of art, among them works by Giorgio de Chirico, Max Ernst, André Masson and Man Ray.

== Selected issues ==
Issue 1 (December 1924): The cover of the initial issue announced the revolutionary agenda of La Révolution surréaliste with, "It is necessary to start work on a new declaration of the rights of man."

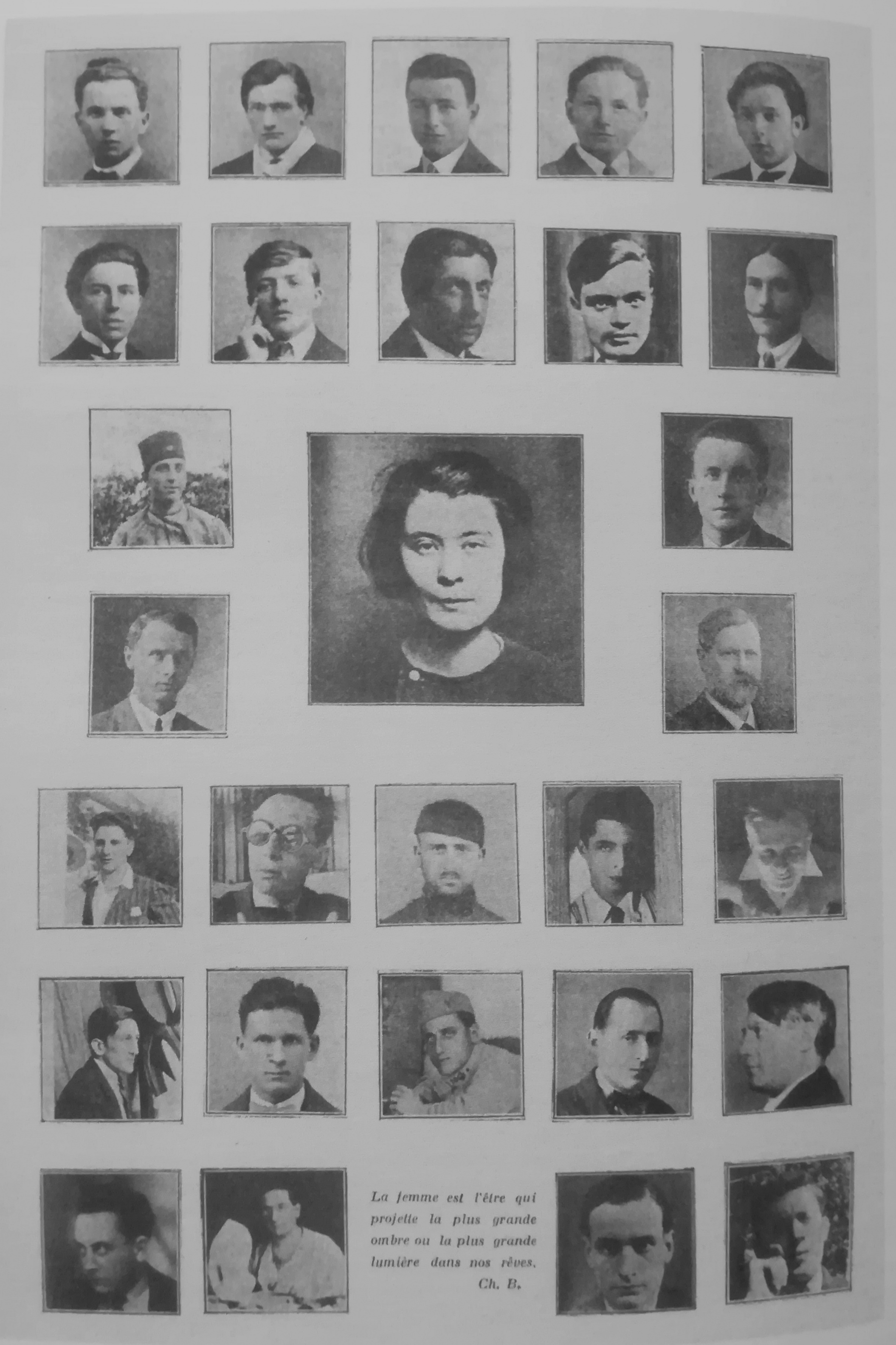
Breton and surrealists in La Révolution surréaliste (1 Dec. 1924).

In a mock scientific fashion the journal explored issues related to the darker sides of the human psyche with articles focused on violence, death and suicide. Detached descriptions of violent crime taken from police reports, and an impartial survey on suicide were included. One spread featured Germaine Berton, recently acquitted of murder, surrounded by male surrealists.

Issue 3 (15 April 1925): The third issues was overseen by writer and actor Antonin Artaud.^{:60} The cover of the third issue announced, "End of the Christian Era." Inside articles convey a blasphemous and anticlerical tone. Artaud wrote an open letter, "Address to the Pope," that expressed the revolt against what Surrealists saw as oppressive religious values:

The world is the soul's abyss, warped Pope, Pope foreign to the soul. Let us swim in our own bodies, leave our souls within our souls; we have no need of your knife-blade of enlightenment.

Such anticlerical remarks are found throughout and reflect the group's relentless campaign against oppression and bourgeois morality.

Issue 4: Breton announced in the fourth issue that he was taking over the publication. His concern about disruptive factions that had developed in the Surrealist group brought him to assert his power and restate the Surrealist principles as he conceived them.

Thereafter, each issue became more political with articles and declarations that have a Communist slant.

Issue 8 (December 1926): The growing fascination with sexual perversion is revealed in an article by Paul Éluard which celebrates the writings of the Marquis de Sade, who was imprisoned for much of his life because of his deviant writings about sexual cruelty. According to Éluard, the Marquis "wished to give back to civilized man the strength of his primitive instincts." Writing and imagery, influenced by de Sade, by Breton, Man Ray, and Salvador Dalí was also included.

Issues 9 and 10 (October 1927): Introduce Exquisite corpse (Le Cadavre exquis)—a game the Surrealists enjoyed that involves folding a sheet of paper so that several people contribute to the drawing of a figure or writing text without seeing the preceding portions. The issue includes some exquisite corpse results.

Issue 11 (): The interest in sex continues in the eleventh issue with "Research into Sexuality," an account of a debate that took place in January 1928. In the frank discussion, more than a dozen Surrealists openly expressed their opinions on sexual matters, including a variety of perversions.

Issue 12 (December 1929): Contains Breton's Second Surrealist Manifesto. The declaration marks the end of the group's most cohesive and focused years, and signals the start of disagreements within the group. Breton celebrated his faithful supporters, and denounced those who had defected and betrayed his doctrine. Also contains the full script of Un Chien Andalou with Luis Buñuel's preface.

== After La Révolution surréaliste ==
Some of the dissidents voiced their views in the periodical Documents beginning in April 1929. Writings by ethnographers, archaeologists, and art historians, and poets Georges Bataille and Michel Leiris emerged as the main contributors. Some of the Documents contributors went later formed another group, Acéphale.

Breton's successor to La Révolution surréaliste was a more politically engaged publication, Le Surrealisme au service de la revolution (Surrealism in the service of the revolution), which appeared sporadically between 1930 and 1933.

In 1933, publisher Albert Skira contacted Breton about a new journal, which he planned to be the most luxurious art and literary review the Surrealists had seen, featuring a slick format with many color illustrations. Skira's restriction was that Breton was not allowed to use the magazine to express his social and political views. Later that year Minotaure began publication, and continued publication until 1939.

== See also ==
- Le Surrealisme au service de la revolution, the follow-up to La Révolution surréaliste published in Paris 1930 to 1933
- View, an American art magazine, primarily covering avant-garde and surrealist art, published from 1940 to 1947
- VVV, a New York City journal published by émigré European surrealists from 1942 through 1944
