= Louis Scutenaire =

Belgian poet

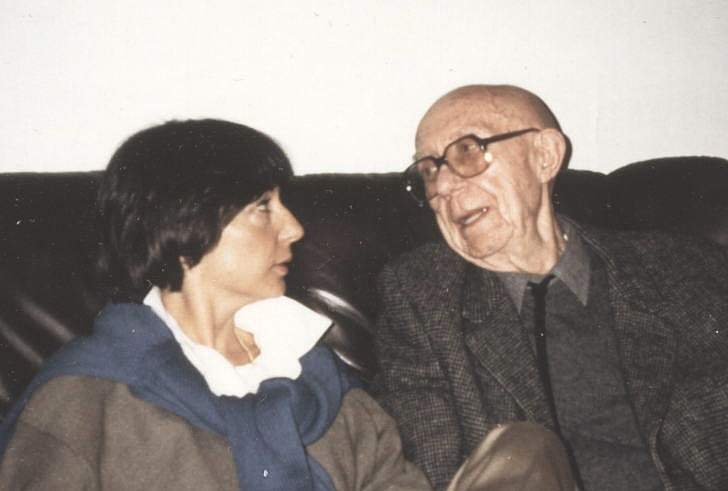
- Scutenaire, 1985
- Born: Jean Émile Louis Scutenaire; 29 June 1905; Ollignies, Belgium
- Died: 15 August 1987 (aged 82); Brussels, Belgium
- Occupations: anarchist, civil servant, poet, surrealist

Louis Scutenaire (29 June 1905 – 15 August 1987) was a Belgian French-language poet, anarchist, surrealist and civil servant. Born Jean Émile Louis Scutenaire in Ollignies, he died in Brussels.

== Life ==
Louis Scutenaire is chiefly remembered as a central figure in the Belgian Surrealist movement, along with René Magritte, Paul Nougé, Marcel Lecomte and his own wife Irène Hamoir. He studied law at the Free University of Brussels (now split into the Université libre de Bruxelles and the Vrije Universiteit Brussel) and was a criminal lawyer from 1931 to 1944. In 1926 he discovered surrealism and was a primary contributor to the Revue surréaliste. He was sympathetic to communism during the 1930s and 1940s but as the truth about Joseph Stalin's regime became more apparent, he grew disenchanted with it and became an anarchist. After the Second World War he became a civil servant in the Belgian Ministry of the Interior, a job he kept for the rest of his life.

Scutenaire grew disillusioned with the increasing commercialisation of Surrealism after the Second World War, but this did not apparently impair his close friendship with the most famous Belgian surrealist René Magritte. Scutenaire and his wife would visit the Magritte home on Sundays, where Scutenaire would be invited to give titles to Magritte's recent paintings; 170 of the paintings still bear the titles that Scutenaire suggested. (He is also the model for the figure in Magritte's canvas Universal Gravitation.)

Scutenaire's published works include a series of books entitled Mes Inscriptions, collections of gnomic and mischievous aphorisms, as well as one of the earliest and most entertaining monographs on Magritte. He was awarded in 1985 the Grand Prix spécial de l'Humour noir in recognition of his achievements as a writer with a lifelong distrust of authority and institution.

He died twenty years to the hour after his friend Magritte, just after watching a television programme on the painter.

== Sources ==
- André Souris, Paul Nougé et ses complices dans "Entretiens sur le surréalisme", sous la direction de Ferdinand Alquié, Mouton, Paris-La Haye, 1968.
- Christian Bussy, Anthologie du surréalisme en Belgique, Paris, Gallimard,1972.
- Marcel Mariën, L'activité surréaliste en Belgique (1924–1950), Bruxelles, Lebeer-Hossmann, 1979.
- René Magritte et le surréalisme en Belgique, Musées Royaux des Beaux-Arts de Belgique, Bruxelles, 1982.
- Louis Scutenaire, Plein Chant n° 33–34, Bassac, novembre 1986-janvier 1987.
- Les écrits de Louis Scutenaire (De 1913 à 1987), 1. Poèmes et proses, note de Michel-Georges-Bernard, Paris, Éditions de l'Orycte, 29 juin 1987 [Textes présentés dans la chronologie de leur écriture].
- Le mouvement surréaliste à Bruxelles et en Wallonie (1924–1947), Paris, Centre Culturel Wallonie Bruxelles, 1988.
- Raoul Vaneigem, Louis Scutenaire, Paris, collection Poètes d'aujourd'hui, Seghers, 1991 ISBN 2-232-10321-8, 190 p.
- René Magritte, La période "vache", "Les pieds dans le plat" avec Louis Scutenaire, Marseille, Musée Cantini, 1992 ISBN 2-7118-2591-4, 168 p.
- Irène, Scut, Magritte & Co, Brussels, Musée Royaux des Beaux-Arts de Belgique, 1996, 558 p.
- Jean-Patrice Courtois, La grammaire inachevable de Louis Scutenaire, dans "Europe", "Les surréalistes belges", n° 912, Paris, avril 2005.
- Xavier Canonne, Le surréalisme en Belgique, 1924–2000, Fonds Mercator, 2007
