= André Souris =

Belgian composer, conductor, musicologist, and writer

- Born: 10 July 1899; Marchienne-au-Pont, Belgium
- Died: 12 February 1970 (aged 70); Paris, France
- Education: Conservatory in Brussels
- Occupations: composer, conductor, musicologist, and writer
- Known for: surrealist movement

André Souris (French: [suʁi]; 10 July 1899 – 12 February 1970) was a Belgian composer, conductor, musicologist, and writer associated with the surrealist movement.

== Biography ==
Souris was born in Marchienne-au-Pont, Belgium, and studied at the Conservatory in Brussels from 1911 to 1918, winning first prizes in music history (1915), harmony (1916), counterpoint and fugue (1917), and the violin (1918). Following postgraduate studies in composition and orchestration with Gilson, he won the Rubens prize in 1927. This enabled him to move to Paris, where he sought out the leaders of the avant garde. He took conducting lessons with Scherchen in 1935, and was a conductor for the Belgian radio from 1937 to 1946 (Vanhulst 2001).

Up until 1923 Souris composed a great deal of music under the strong influence of Claude Debussy, but after discovering other musical styles at the Pro Arte Concerts, he repudiated these early works and adopted Erik Satie and Igor Stravinsky as his models. Joining the Belgian surrealists of the group Correspondance around Paul Nougé, he wrote deliberately banal music, beginning with the Choral, marche et galop for four brass instruments (1925), which became his op. 1—a work clearly indebted to L'Histoire du soldat (Vanhulst 2001). He lived in Italy, France, and Austria, and died in Paris (Anon. 2009).
