= Marcel Mariën =

Belgian artist (1920–1993)

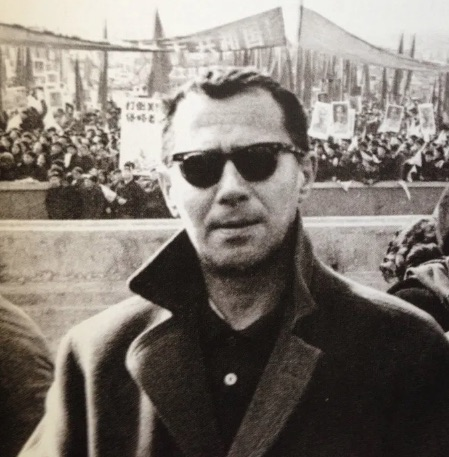
- Born: 29 April 1920; Antwerp, Belgium
- Died: 19 September 1993 (aged 73); Brussels, Belgium
- Known for: Artist, photographer, essayist
- Movement: Surrealism

Marcel Mariën (29 April 1920 – 19 September 1993) was a Belgian surrealist (later Situationist), poet, essayist, photographer, collagist, and filmmaker.

Mariën was a pivotal member of the Belgian wing of the Surrealist movement. In addition to his work as a surrealist artist and photographer, he was also known as a publisher, bookseller, sailor, journalist in China and an elaborate Surrealist prankster.

== Early life ==
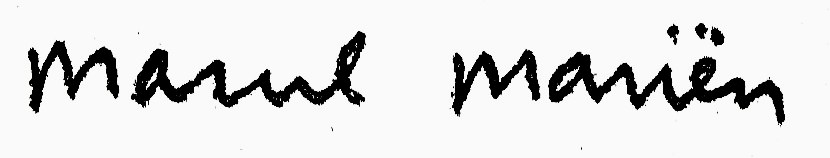
Signature of Marcel Mariën

Marcel Mariën was born in Antwerp, Belgium, in 1920. He was a single child from a poor family. At the age of fifteen, Mariën left school to become a photographer's apprentice.

In 1937, after viewing an exhibition of the surrealist paintings of René Magritte, he travelled to Brussels to apprentice for the painter. The next year, he exhibited his own artwork titled L'INTROUVABLE (The Untraceable) alongside Magritte in the Surrealist group exhibition Surrealist Objects and Poems in London.

Mariën enlisted in the Belgian Army in Antwerp in January 1939 and served for seventeen months during World War II. During the German invasion of Belgium, he looked after the casualties at the hospital of Antwerp before being evacuated, bringing along two large bags of books which he refused to leave behind. Upon reaching Dunkirk, he was taken captive and held as a prisoner of war in Görlitz for nine months.

Following his release, he returned to Brussels and, in 1943, wrote and published the very first monograph on Magritte.

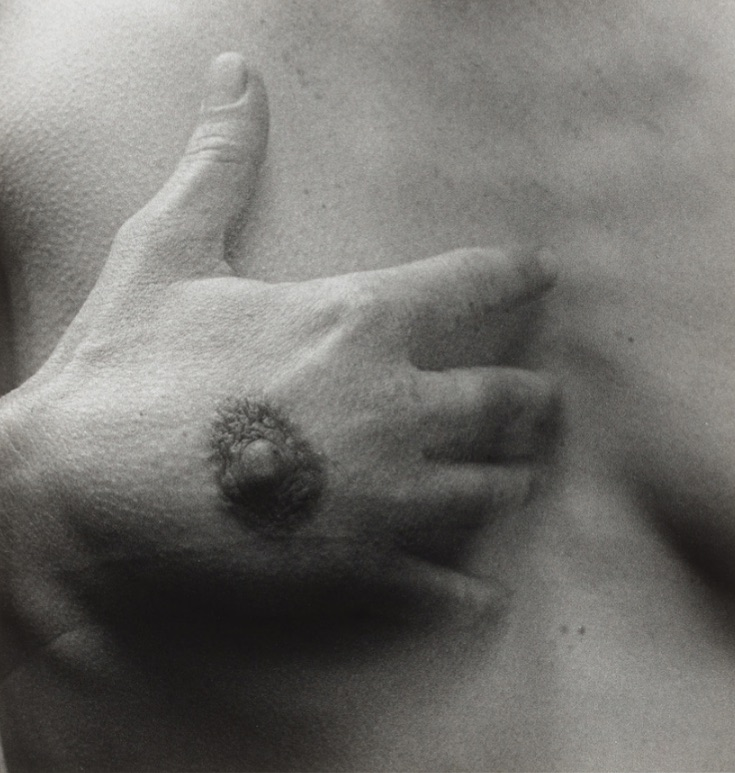
Le Double Usage (1992), an example of Marien's surrealist photography

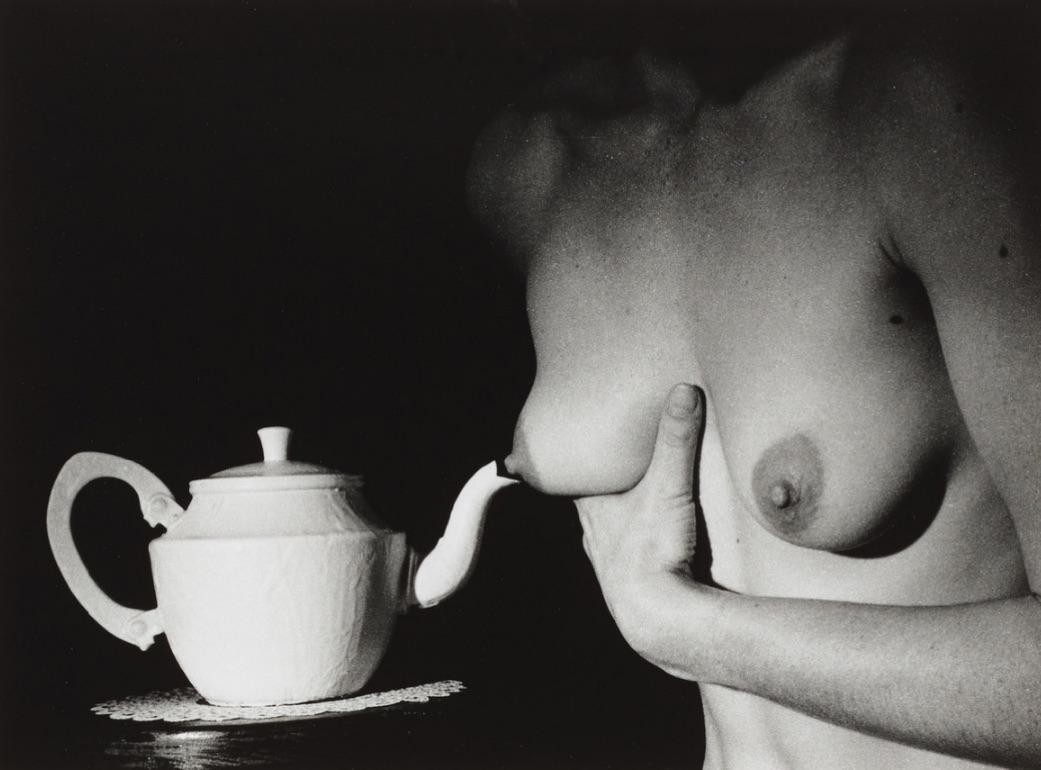
'Le Bouts-Rimes' (1985) by Marcel Mariën

== Art ==
Mariën's early attempts at expressing his ideas in photography were unsuccessful. It was not until 1943 that he produced his first photograph with a distinctive personal vision, "De Sade à Lénine", an image of a woman cutting a slice of bread, the loaf gripped tightly against her naked torso, the blade pointing at her left breast. Mariën commented, "the knife passes from de Sade to Lenin".

It was pure Surrealism, marked with the two themes that would characterize his photography: the everyday object stripped of its traditional function and the female body as an instrument of creation.

Despite this and other successful photographs, Mariën would soon abandon photography to concentrate on object-making, drawing and writing. Forever a restless spirit, in 1951 he signed on for two years as a sailor on a Danish cargo ship. In 1962, he lived in New York for a year before relocating to Communist China from 1963 until 1965, where he worked as a translator on the French edition of the magazine China Under Construction until his disillusionment with Maoism.

In 1959, in a further attempt to challenge traditional attitudes, he produced and directed the film, L'Imitation du cinema. A combination of sexual and religious imagery, it caused a scandal in Belgium and was banned in France. Even with the support of the Kinsey Institute, it proved impossible to have the film shown in the United States.

== Writer, publisher and essayist ==
Although Marien worked as an artist across many media, some of the most notable achievements throughout his career were as a chronicler of the Belgian Surrealists' activities and a publisher of their writings. He contributed to various publications, including London Bulletin, Cahiers d'art, and View.

In 1943, Marien published the very first monograph on Magritte. In 1954 he founded the magazine, Les Lèvres Nues, and directed his review Le Ciel Bleu with Christian Dotremont and Paul Colinet. He published the writings of such Belgian Surrealists as Paul Nougé, Louis Scutenaire and André Souris, as well as Magritte himself, in a series that eventually extended to hundreds of titles.

In 1979, Marien published L'Activité Surréaliste en Belgique, a chronological record of all the documents, manifestos, tracts and articles pertaining to the surrealist movement in Belgium that appeared between 1924 and 1950.

Even as late as 1983, the appearance of his outrageously libellous autobiography in Le Radeau de la Mémoire was able to cause a scandal.

== Prankster ==
Mariën and his fellow Surrealists loved making jokes. In 1953, Mariën went to the Belgian coast, where he distributed false bank notes printed by René and Paul Magritte. In 1962, the joke was on Magritte when Mariën and Leo Dohmen produced a tract, "La Grande Baisse", to coincide with a major retrospective of Magritte's work in Knokke. Presented as written by Magritte himself, it announced drastic discounts on the artist's major paintings and offered the chance to order them in different sizes.

Even leading Surrealists, amongst them André Breton, failed to grasp the joke and praised Magritte for this undertaking. Magritte was furious when he found out and the 25-year friendship between Magritte and Mariën was over.

=== International Prize for Human Stupidity ===
In 1955 Mariën established the International Prize for Human Stupidity. King Baudouin of Belgium was awarded the first prize.

== Return to photography ==
In 1980, Mariën returned to his roots in surrealist photography. He became extremely prolific until his death in Brussels in 1993, often posing nude female models with strange objects or in absurd situations.
