= Paul Nougé =

Belgian writer

- Born: 13 February 1895; Brussels, Belgium
- Died: 6 November 1967 (aged 72); Brussels, Belgium
- Occupations: Surrealist, Philosopher, Poet, Photographer

Paul Nougé (French pronunciation: [pɔl nuʒe]; 12 February 1895 – 6 November 1967) was a Belgian poet, founder and theoretician of surrealism in Belgium, sometimes known as the "Belgian Breton".

== Biography ==
Born of a French father who originated from the Charent region in France and a Belgian mother, Paul Nougé attended a French school in Brussels studying Biological Chemistry and worked as a Biochemist in a medical laboratory from 1919 to 1953. He became a founding member of the first Belgian Communist Party in 1919. In November 1924 he created the journal Correspondance, which published 26 pamphlets up to September 1925, in collaboration with Camille Goemans and Marcel Lecomte. In July 1925 he was expelled from the party. That same year Nougé met the French surrealists, Louis Aragon, André Breton and Paul Éluard, and together they signed the tract "La Révolution d'abord et toujours" (The Revolution First and Forever). In 1926 he made the acquaintance of Louis Scutenaire, and September of that year marked the drafting of the constitution of the Belgian Surrealist Group that comprised Nougé, Goemans, René Magritte, E. L. T. Mesens and André Souris.

In 1927 Nougé composed plagiarised examples of a grammar book of Clarisse Juranville, illustrated with five drawings by Magritte. In 1928 he founded the magazine Distances and wrote the poem catalogue of a fur trader that was illustrated by Magritte entitled Le catalogue Samuel (re-edited by Didier Devillez, Brussels, 1996). He also wrote the preface of a Magritte exhibition at the gallery "L'époque" (signed by his 'accomplices' Goemans, Mesens, Lecomte, Scutenaire and Souris) and delivered in January 1929 to Charleroi – a conference on the accompanying music to a concert conducted by Souris and an exhibition of Magritte ("La conférence de Charleroi", published in 1946). Between December 1929 and February 1930 Nougé created 19 photographs, unpublished until 1968, under the title Subversion des images. These photographs have since been displayed, notably at the Edinburgh Art Festival 2009. In 1931 he wrote the preface to an exhibition which followed the return of Magritte to Brussels. Extracts from "Images défendues" were published in 1933 in issue number 5 of Surréalisme au service de la Révolution. In 1934 Nougé co-signed "L'action immédiate" in Documents 34, edited by Mesens. In 1935 "Le Couteau dans la plaie" ('The Knife in the Wound') was published and in 1936, René Magritte ou la révélation objective was published in "Les Beaux-Arts" in Brussels. In that same year, Nougé, along with Mesens, organised the exclusion of Souris from the group.

Nougé was mobilised in 1939 in Mérignac then Biarritz, during World War II, as a military nurse. In 1941 Nougé prefaced an exhibition, quickly closed by the occupying forces, of photographs by Raoul Ubac in Brussels L'expérience souveraine (The Sovereign Experience). In 1943 he published the complete text of René Magritte ou Les images défendues. In January 1944, under the pseudonym of Paul Lecharantais, he prefaced a new exhibition of Magritte that was criticized by the collaborators of nazism. In 1945 Nougé participated in the exhibition "Surréalisme" organised by the Editions La Boétie de Bruxelles gallery. In 1946 he published La Conférence de Charleroi and, under the title Élémentaires a preface for the exhibition of Magritte "Le Surréalisme en Plein Soleil" (Surrealism in Full Sunlight) at the Dietrich gallery.

Paul Nougé died in Brussels on 6 November 1967.

A number of his poems have been translated into English by Robert Archambeau and Jean-Luc Garneau, and appear in the poetry magazine Samizdat.

== Selective bibliography ==
- Histoire de ne pas rire, Les Lèvres nues, Brussels, 1956; L'Âge d'homme, Lausanne, 1980.
- L'Expérience continue, Les Lèvres nues, Brussels, 1966; L'Âge d'homme, Lausanne, 1981.
- Journal (1941-1950), Les Lèvres nues, Brussels, 1968; Didier Devillez Editor, Brussels, 1995.
- From 1973 numerous unpublished texts by Nougé were published by Tom Gutt in "Le Vocatif".
- Des mots à la rumeur publique, Lausanne, L'Âge d'homme, 1983.
- Erotiques, Didier Devillez editor, Brussels, 1994.
- Journal 1941-1950, Didier Devillez editor, Brussels, 1995.
- Quelques lettres, Didier Devillez editor, Brussels, 1995.
- Paul Nougé, René Magritte, Le catalogue Samuel, prefaced by Tom Gutt, Brussels, Didier Devillez, 1996.
- René Magritte (in extenso), Didier Devillez editor, Brussels, 1997.
- Fragments, Didier Devillez editor, Brussels, 1997.
- La Musique est dangereuse, writings around music, compiled and presented by Robert Wangermée, Didier Devillez editor, Brussels, 2001.

=== Re-issued journals ===
- Correspondance (1924-1925), Brussels, Didier Devillez, "Fac Similé", 1993
- Marie, Journal bimensuel pour la belle jeunesse (1926-1927), Brussels, Didier Devillez, "Fac Similé", 1993.

=== About Nougé ===
- André Souris, Paul Nougé et ses complices in "Entretiens sur le surréalisme", under the direction of Ferdinand Alquié, Mouton, Paris-La Haye, 1968.
- Christian Bussy, Anthologie du surréalisme en Belgique, Paris, Gallimard, 1972.
- Marcel Mariën, L'activité surréaliste en Belgique (1924-1950), Brussels, Lebeer-Hossmann, 1979.
- René Magritte et le surréalisme en Belgique, Royal Museums of Fine Arts of Belgium, Brussels, 1982.
- Le mouvement surréaliste à Bruxelles et en Wallonie (1924-1947), Paris, Centre Culturel Wallonie Brussels, 1988.
- Olivier Smolders, Paul Nougé, Écriture et caractère. À l'école de la ruse, Labor, Brussels, 1995.
- Christine de Naeyer, Paul Nougé et la photographie, Brussels, Didier Devillez, 1995.
- Irène, Scut, Magritte & Co, Brussels, Royal Museums of Fine Arts of Belgium, 1996, 558 p.

=== See also ===
- Surrealism in Belgium (in French)
