= Max Lingner =

German painter

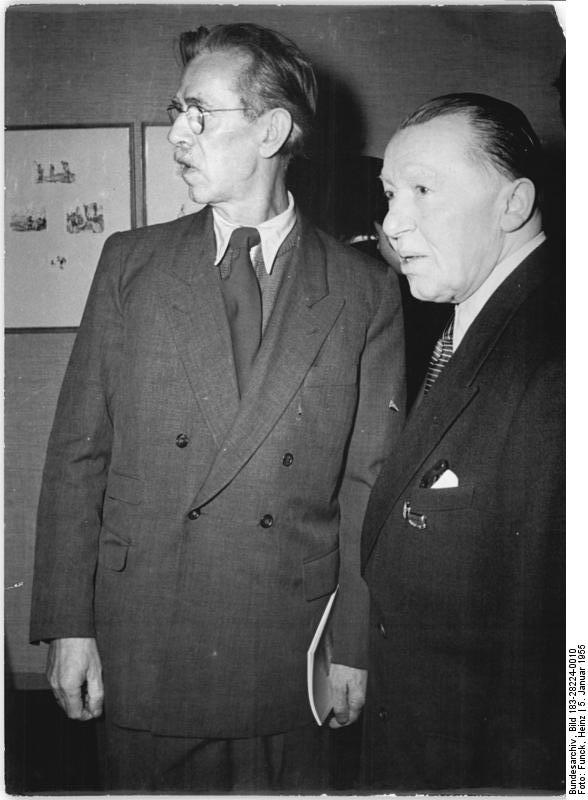
Max Lingner (right) with Otto Nagel, 1955

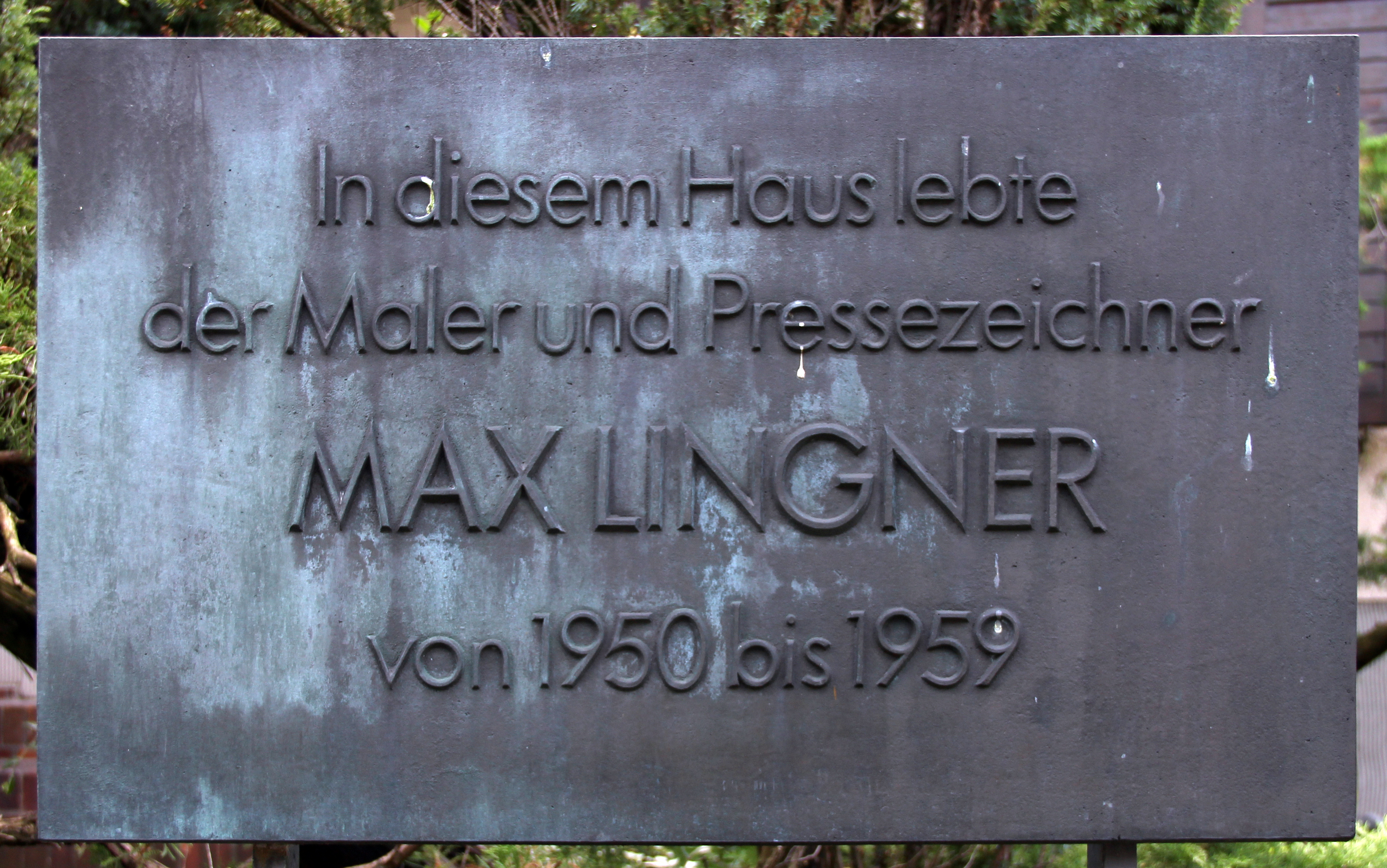
Commemorative plaque on his house, Straße 201 No. 2, in Niederschönhausen

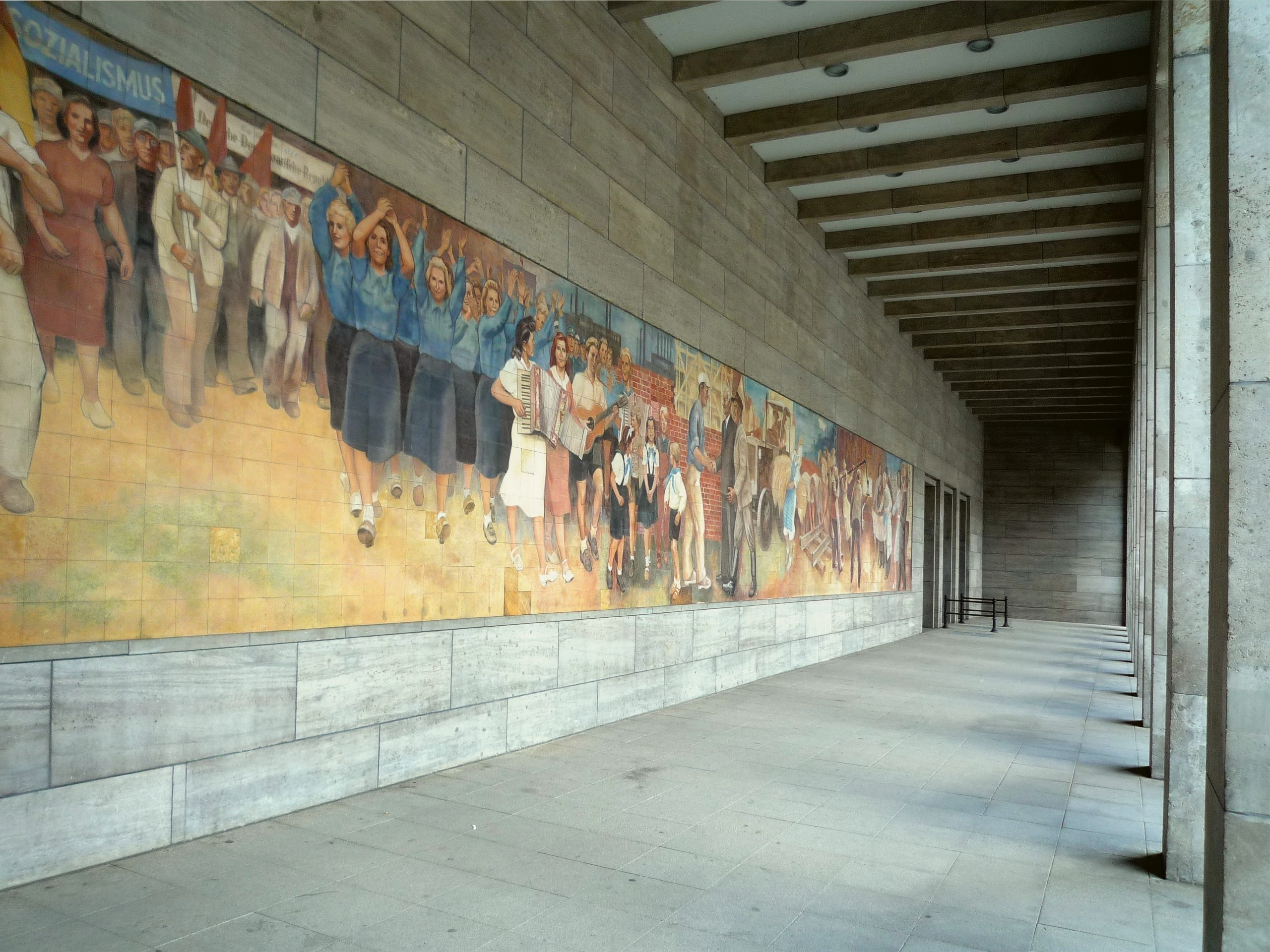
Mural on the Detlev-Rohwedder-Haus Berlin, partial view

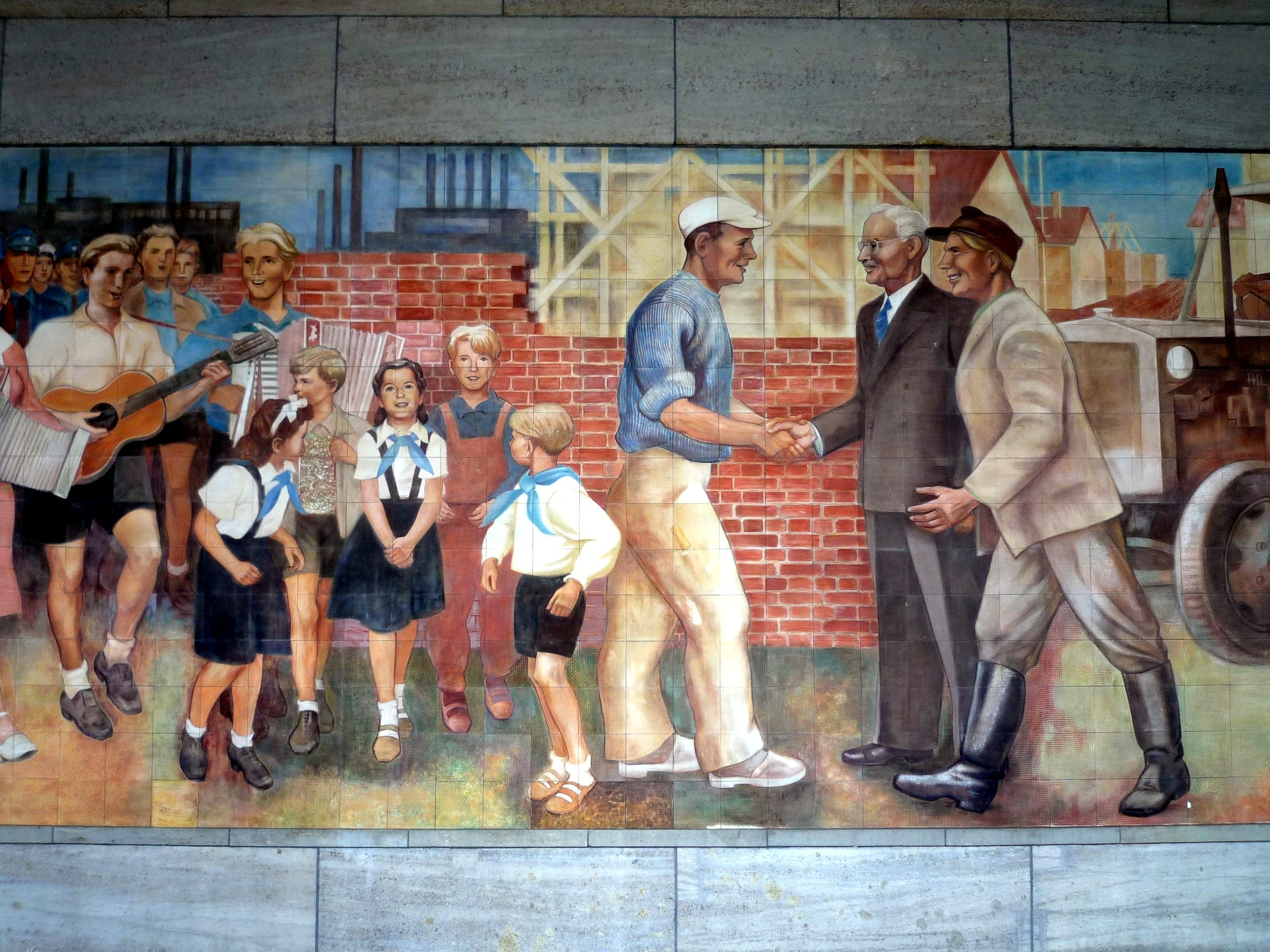
Mural on the Detlev-Rohwedder-Haus Berlin, Detailc

Max Lingner (17 November 1888 – 14 March 1959) was a German painter, graphic artist, communist, and resistance fighter against the Nazi regime.

== Life ==
Born in Leipzig, the son of a xylographer, Lingner graduated from high school in 1907 and studied as a master student under Carl Bantzer at the Dresden Academy of Fine Arts, where he completed his training in 1912 with a painting Singing Girls, for which he received the "Saxon State Prize". On a study trip in 1913/1914 he visited England, the Netherlands, France and Belgium.

In First World War he had to fight on all fronts. In 1918, he took part in the Kiel mutiny and became a member of the soldiers' council in Kiel. He settled in the village of Born on the Darß from 1919 to 1922, but failed as a farmer. From 1922 to 1927, he worked as a painter and graphic artist in Weißenfels, but greater successes failed to materialise. On the advice of Käthe Kollwitz, he moved to Paris.

The first years in the French capital also passed without any great impressions for him. The tide turned when Henri Barbusse won him a job at the weekly newspaper Monde. Here Lingner's great talent as a press artist became apparent, so that he was soon entrusted with the entire artistic design of the newspaper. The Monde appeared from 1928 until Barbusse's death in 1935. From 1931 onwards, Lingner's style shaped the appearance of the newspaper. He created drawings for title pages, but also drawings and illustrations for the published texts and literary supplements.

== French-language press titles in which Max Lingner has collaborated ==
- Monde, of which he made more than ten front pages between 5 September 1931 and 10 October 1935 and numerous illustrations on the inside pages from 1930 onwards.
- Avant-garde, of which he made several drawings in front page from 1935 to 1939.
- La Vie ouvrière, of which he notably made the "front page" of the issue of 1 May 1938.
- L'Humanité, from 1936 to 1939 and from 1944 to 1949. He made many drawings on the front page, and illustrated several series of articles on the inside pages about Paris. Before the war, he also illustrated the serials of Alexandre Dumas published in the newspaper: La Reine Margot and the beginning of the serial The Count of Monte Cristo. This long-running serial would not be finished because the newspaper was banned after 26 August 1939. In 1946, he illustrated another serial: Les aventures de Thyl Ulenspiegel et de Lanime Gœdzak, by Charles De Coster. The following year he illustrated two novels whose drawings accompanied the serial publication: Gouverneurs de la rosée by Jacques Roumain, and Martin Eden by Jack London.
- Regards, where he illustrates short stories and novels, such as Fièvre au village by Ludovic Massé and A Tale of Two Cities, a novel by Charles Dickens which appeared in the summer of 1936.
- Jeunes filles de France, newspaper of the Union des jeunes filles de France.
- Le Drapeau rouge, organ of the Belgian Communist Party.
- Almanach ouvrir et paysan by L'Humanité, between 1936 and 1949 he took part in this publication en:
  - 1936: illustrations for a short story, Acier, by Philippe Logier.
  - 1937: 26 illustrations for a proletarian novel, L'étau, written by Pierre Bochot (60 pages).
  - 1938: illustration for a song poem by [Eugène Pottier], La Commune n'est pas morte.
  - 1939: 26 illustrations for a novel by Tristan Rémy, Une nuit de réveillon (40 pages)
  - 1948: illustrations for two short stories, A Russian Mother by Tatiana Oks, Un Jeu by Albert Maltz.
  - 1949: 3 illustrations for a short story by the Soviet writer Wanda Wasilewska, The Last Tale of Scheherazade.

With these works, he found his way into Parisian artistic life. In 1934, he joined the Association of Revolutionary Writers and Artists of France (AEAR). He participated in exhibitions of this group. In 1933, Lingner showed his first works at the Galerie Billet (Pierre Vorms), and further exhibitions took place in Paris in 1939 and 1947.

The paintings and drawings shown there were created alongside his daily work as a press illustrator. He also brought back hundreds of ink drawings from his forays through Parisian working-class suburbs - the banlieue - and motifs and people from these wanderings were often found in his paintings and press drawings. He liked to paint and draw motifs of French women.

=== Exhibitions in Paris ===
- Three exhibitions of his works took place in Paris when he stayed there, in 1933, in 1939, both at the Billiet-Worms Gallery and in 1947 at the La Boétie Gallery.
- March - September 1970, the Musée d'art et d'histoire de Saint-Denis (Seine-Saint-Denis) mounted an exhibition of works created during the period when he lived in France: Un peintre allemand en France. Max Lingner. 1929 - 1949 Paintings and drawings.
- In the spring of 2020, the Musée de l'Histoire vivante, in Montreuil organised an exhibition Max Lingner. À la recherche du temps présent proposed by the Max-Lingner-Stiftung in Berlin. The inauguration in the presence of representatives of the Max-Lingner-Stiftung took place on Saturday 14 March, just before the confinement.

In 1939, during the exhibition of works by Max Lingner, the art critic George Besson could write in Ce soir: Max Lingner's sketches have for ten years been the ornament of the proletarian press (...) Lingner scattered more than 6,000 drawings of a very particular sensitivity and expressive line. An opportunity arises to discover another no less human aspect of Lingner's work, for he is the painter of serious Parisian landscapes (...) and compositions to the glory of a youth whose attitudes speak of joie de vivre and health.

After the closure of Monde he worked for the newspaper of the trade unions La Vie Ouvrière and for the newspaper of the youth l'Avant-Garde and the newspaper of the Parti communiste français l'Humanité, of which he had been a member since 1934. From 1939 to 1940, he was imprisoned and held in the Gurs internment camp in southern France. He was interned, escaped and lived illegally under the name Marcel Lantier. He joined the French Resistance Movement in 1943 and returned to Paris in 1944. Again, he worked for l'Humanité and, despite serious illness, devoted himself to painting.

In 1949, he returned to Germany and became professor of contemporary painting at the Weißensee Academy of Art Berlin. On his return, he donated 40 paintings, watercolours and drawings to the "People of Progressive Germany". Among them was one of his most famous paintings, Mademoiselle Yvonne. In 1950, he and others founded the Academy of Arts, Berlin. During this period he came under suspicion of "Formalism", being accused of his French-influenced visual language. Even one of his most outstanding works, the monumental Wandbilder aus Meißner Porzellan "Aufbau der Republik" from 1952 at the former House of Ministries (today the Federal Ministry of Finance, during the Nazi era Reich Air Ministry) in Leipziger Straße, came under criticism from government and cultural officials. Lingner was accused here not only of the lightness of the figures, which was typical of his "French" style, but also that he had not depicted a tractor in the painting accurately according to the actual model. The painting was eventually adapted to meet most of the points of criticism.

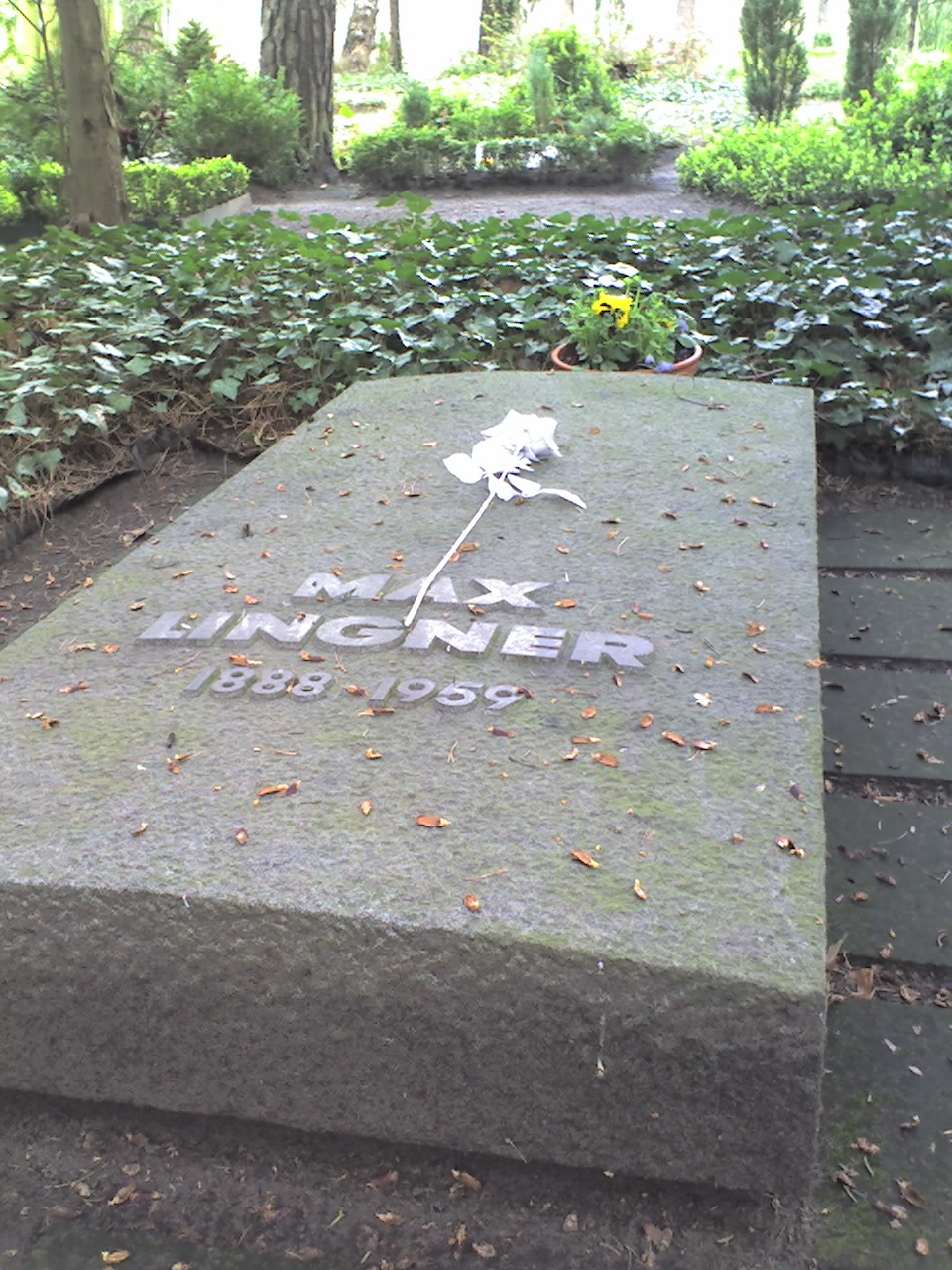
Grave

In addition to the mural, his work Two Wars - Two Widows is also one of Lingner's most important paintings. Lingner lived in Niederschönhausen in the house Beatrice-Zweig-Strasse 2. His grave is located in the municipal Pankow Cemetery III on Leonhard-Frank-Strasse in Niederschönhausen. It is dedicated as an Honorary Grave of the City of Berlin.

Lingner died in Berlin at the age of 70.

== Legacy ==
In 1969, the Max Lingner Archive was established in Lingner's former home and studio as a branch of the German Academy of Arts in Berlin (East), which remained in the possession of Lingner's widow until her death in 1997. The administration of the estate was then continued by the art historian Dr. Gertrud Heider, who also headed the Max Lingner Circle of Friends. Since March 1999, Lingner's written estate as well as photographs of his work, press graphics and a small part of his artistic oeuvre have been in the archive of the Academy of Art, Berlin. The materials are being scientifically processed there and are available for public use. After Gertrud Heider's death in August 2007, the Max Lingner Foundation was founded in her will, which is supervised by the Rosa Luxemburg Foundation but is free in its work. It supports the further processing of the part of the artistic estate remaining in the Lingner House. Among others, the former Berlin Senator for Culture Thomas Flierl is represented on the board.

== Well-known works ==
- Mein Hof auf dem Darß (1920)
- Im Boot (1931)
- Monde-Alphabet (1934)
- Madrid 1937 (1937)
- Mademoiselle Yvonne (1939)
- Paris 1943 (1943)
- Zwei Kriege – zwei Witwen (1948)
- Arbeit am Wandbild Aufbau der Republik at the Reichsluftfahrtministerium (1950–1953)
- Arbeiten am Gemälde Der große Deutsche Bauernkrieg (1951–1955)
- Volkslied (1958)

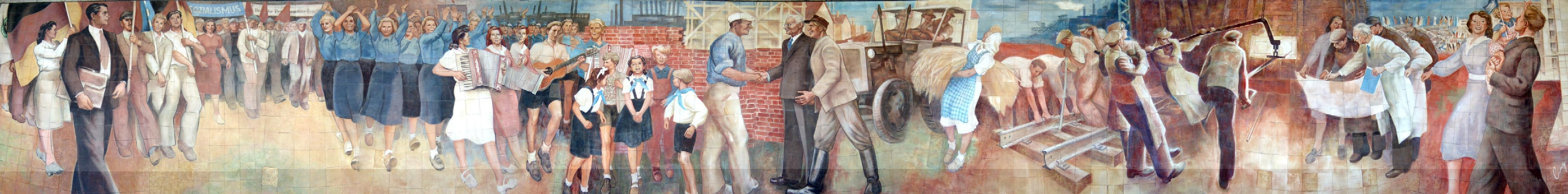
Mural on the Meißner Porzellanplatten Aufbau der Republik (1952/53) at Detlev-Rohwedder-Haus in Berlin

== Awards ==
- National Prize of the German Democratic Republic II. Klasse for Art and Literature for his entire body of work to date. (1952)
- Patriotic Order of Merit in Silver (1954)
- National Prize of the German Democratic Republic III. Klasse for Art and Literature for his painting Der große Deutsche Bauernkrieg (1955)

== Publications ==
- Mein Leben und meine Arbeit. VEB Verlag der Kunst, Dresden 1955.
- Gurs. Bericht und Aufruf. Zeichnungen aus einem französischen Internierungslager 1941. Dietz, Berlin 1982
