= Holy Week (disambiguation) =

Holy Week is a religious celebration in Christianity.

Holy Week may also refer to:

- Holy Week (album), a 2005 album by Duke Garwood
- Holy Week (film), a 1995 Polish film

== See also ==
- La Semaine Sainte, a 1953 novel by Louis Aragon
- Semana santa, a 2002 thriller film
- Semana Santa (2015 film), a Mexican drama film
