= Association des Écrivains et Artistes Révolutionnaires =

Artists and writers organization based in France

The Association des Écrivains et Artistes Révolutionnaires (AEAR) was a French association of revolutionary artists and writers active between 1932 and 1939.

An association of the same name was formed in 2006.

The AEAR was founded by communist and communist-sympathizing writers in March 1932 as the French section of the International Union of Revolutionary Writers, established by the Comintern in the Soviet Union in 1930. Leading figures included Paul Vaillant-Couturier, Léon Moussinac, Charles Vildrac and Francis Jourdain.

Originally the task of the organization was to promote Soviet art and culture but later under the direction of Vaillant-Couturier, members of the AEAR mobilized against war and fascism after the organization released the brochure "Those who have chosen, Against fascism in Germany. Against French imperialism". Together with the Fédération Musicale Populaire (FMP), the organization played a key role in introducing Soviet music to France. Among other activities, the AEAR published the journal Commune.

== Notable members ==
- Henri-Georges Adam
- Louis Aragon
- Yves Allégret
- Henri Barbusse
- Jacques-André Boiffard
- Henri Cartier-Bresson
- André Breton (left the group in 1933)
- Luis Buñuel
- Claude Cahun (civil name Lucy Schwob)
- Robert Capa
- André Chamson
- René Crevel
- Robert Desnos
- Paul Éluard
- Marx Ernst
- Élie Faure
- André Gide
- Jean Giono
- Francis Jourdain
- Jean Lévy
- Max Lingner
- Eli Lotar
- Dora Maar
- André Malraux
- Frans Masereel
- Suzanne Malherbe (alias Marcel Moore)
- Léon Moussinac
- Paul Nizan
- Jean Painlevé
- Édouard Pignon
- Man Ray (briefly)
- Romain Rolland
- Paul Nizan
- Benjamin Peret
- Charlotte Perriand
- Georges Politzer
- Vladimir Pozner
- Marie-Claude Vaillant-Couturier
- Gerda Taro
- Paul Vaillant-Couturier
- Tristan Rémy
- Jean Vigo
- Charles Vildrac
