= Léon Moussinac =

French film critic and historian

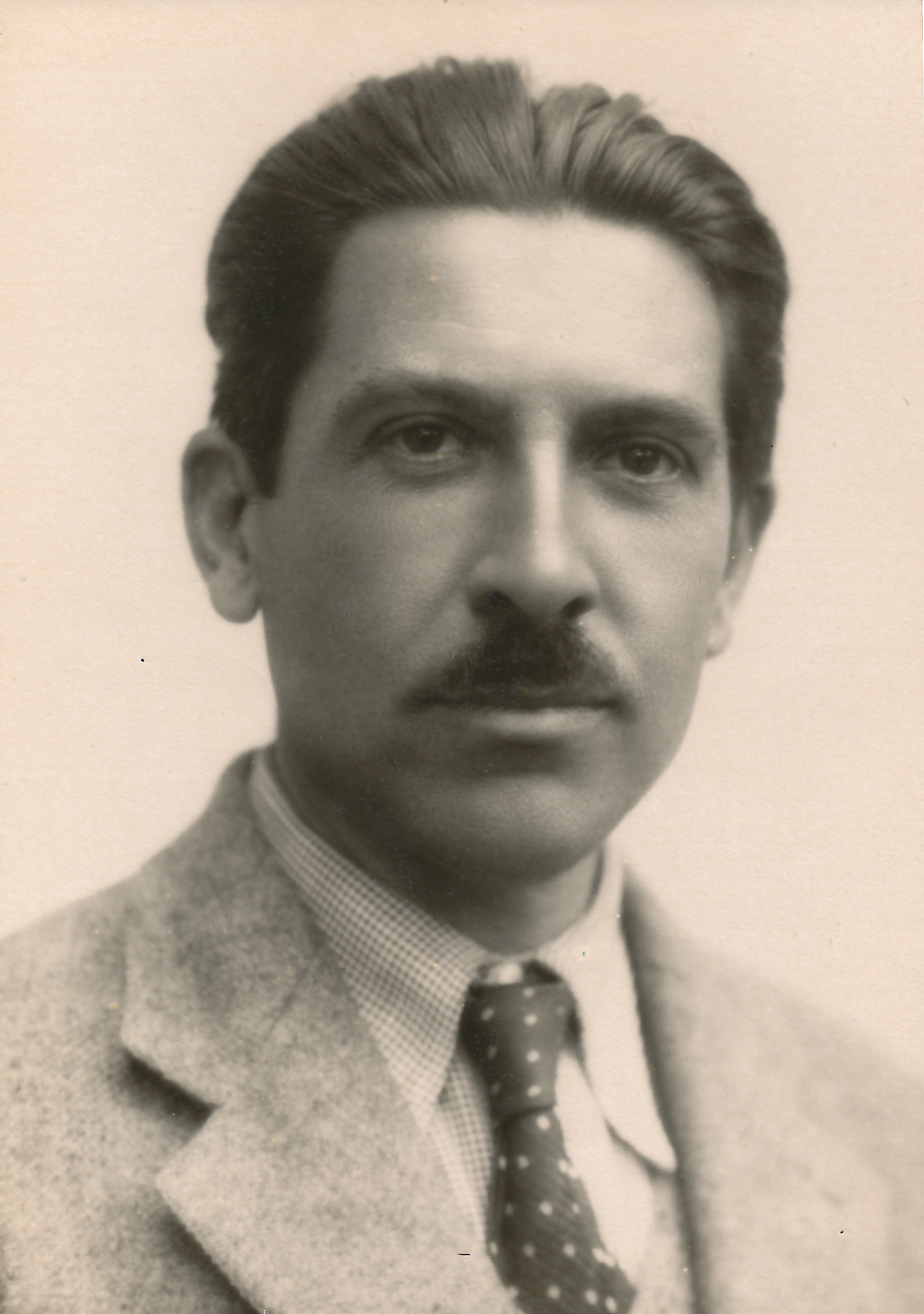
- Moussinac in 1934
- Born: 19 January 1890; Migennes, France
- Died: 10 March 1964 (aged 74); Paris, France
- Resting place: Père Lachaise cemetery
- Occupations: Film critic, historian, theorist, journalist

Léon Pierre Guillaume Moussinac (French pronunciation: [leɔ̃ pjɛʁ ɡijom musinak]; 19 January 1890 – 10 March 1964) was a French writer, film and art critic, film historian and film theorist.

== Life and career ==
Moussinac was born in the family of a railroad station master. He studied law and had to leave his home with his family after his father's death in 1907.

Settling in Paris, he studied at the Faculty of Law at the Lyceum of Charlemagne, where he met Louis Delluc, who had a significant influence on Mussinac, attracting him to poetry, theater, interested in painting and modern literature. During his studies, he began to write poetry, plays, romantic dramas, and was also engaged in journalism. In 1914 he drafted in to the French Army and served there until 1918.

In 1919, Moussinac wrote his first review article for Le Film which was directed by his friend Delluc. Soon he became a known film critic in France and started to write articles for Mercure de France and later for the newspaper L'Humanité, which was the organ of the French Communist Party, editing a weekly column called weekly column "Cinema". Moussinac joined the Communist Party in the same year.

Mussinac actively fought for the promotion of Soviet cinema in France. It was because of him that the films of Dziga Vertov and Strike by Sergei Eisenstein were shown at the 1925 Exhibition of Decorative Arts. He also organized a screening of the film Battleship Potemkin and founded the first in France mass cinema club "Friends of Spartacus", which was engaged in the propaganda of Soviet cinema. In 1927, Mussinac visited the Soviet Union, after which he wrote the book Le cinéma soviétique (Soviet cinema) in 1928.

In 1930 along with Paul Vaillant-Couturier and Louis Aragon, Moussinac founded the Association des Écrivains et Artistes Révolutionnaires (AEAR) created in France, at the head of it which also appeared Charles Vildrac and Francis Jourdain. Under the implied authority of the French Communist Party, the goal of association, and its organ Commune, was to bring together the various cultural currents which, in France, are concerned at the time the relationship between the revolutionary commitment, art and culture.

After the occupation of France and the coming to power of Philippe Pétain, Mussinac was arrested for "communist propaganda". After he was released he was forced to hide for a long time in the south of the country, wanted by the French police. Eventually he became a member of the French Resistance. After World War II, he directed film studies at the University of Paris. From 1947 to 1949 he was rector of the Institut des hautes études cinématographiques (IDHEC).

Leon Mussinac died of a heart attack on 10 March 1964 and is buried in the Père Lachaise cemetery near the Wall of the Communards.

== Works ==
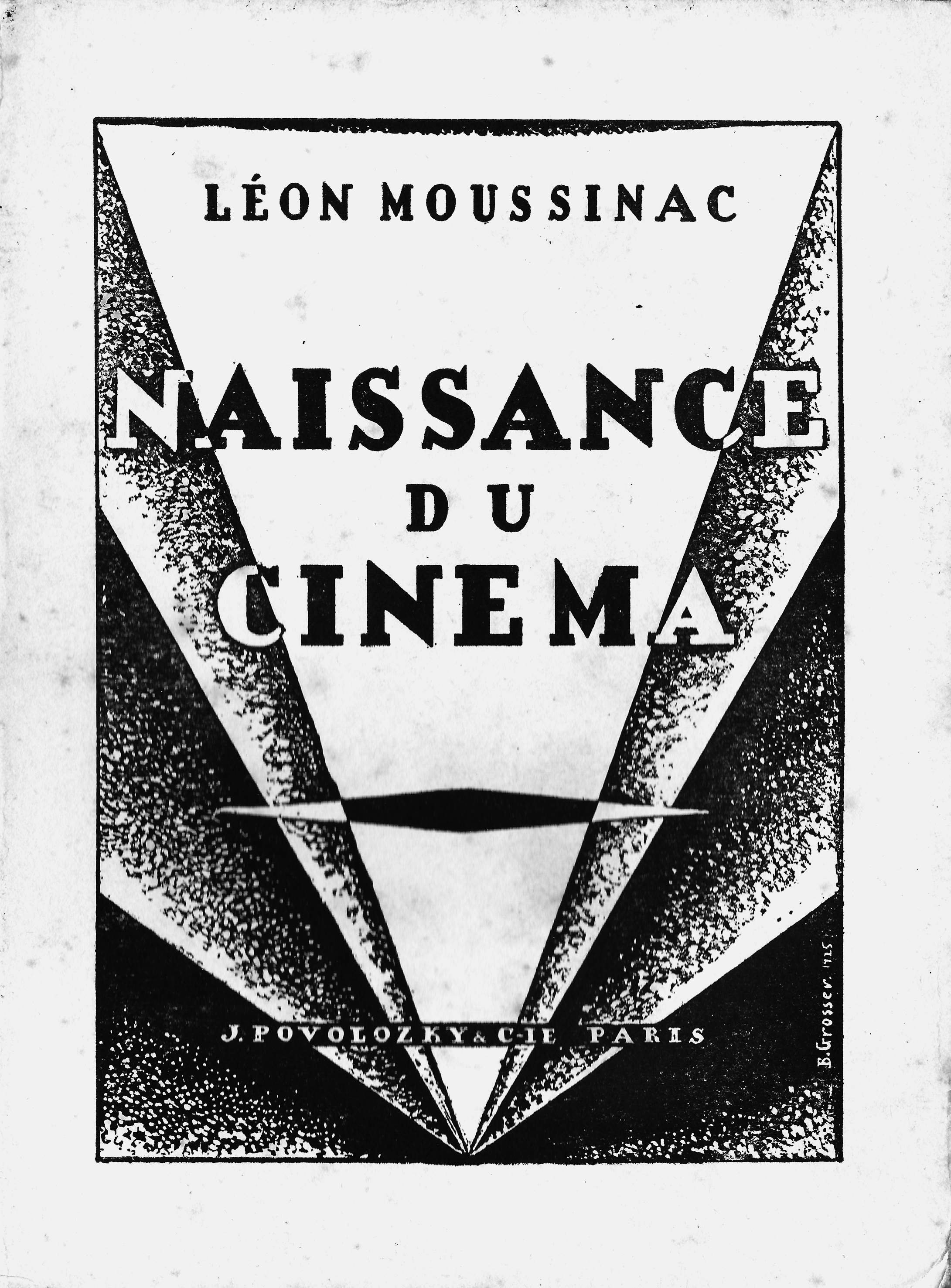
Léon Moussinac's Naissance du cinéma, 1925

=== Fiction ===
- La Tête la premièr, novel
- Dernière heure, Ed. Librairie de France, 1923, poem
- Manifestation interdite, Éditions Sociales Internationales, 1935, novel
- Le Radeau de la Méduse, Paris, Éditions Hier et aujourd'hui, 1945
- Aubes clandestines, recueil de poèmes, 1945

=== Non-fiction ===
- Nouvelles Tendances du théâtre, 1931
- Traité de la mise en scène, Massin et Cie, 1948
- Le théâtre des origines à nos jours, Amiot-Dumont, 1957
- Naissance du cinéma, Paris, Éd. J. Povolozky, 1925, et Éditions d’Aujourd’hui, 1983
- S.M. Eisenstein, Seghers, 1963
- L'Âge ingrat du cinéma, Éditions du Sagittaire, 1946; Éditeurs français réunis, 1967, préface de Georges Sadoul
