= Vladimir Pozner (writer) =

French writer and translator

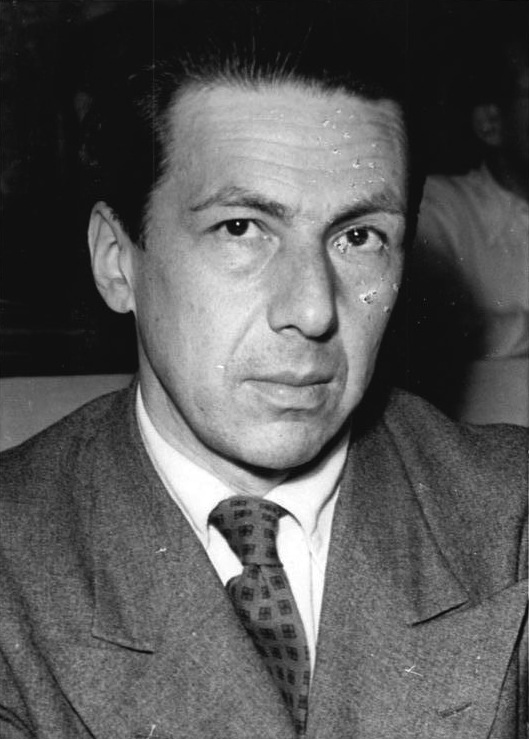
Vladimir Pozner (1950)

Vladimir Solomonovich Pozner (Russian: Влади́мир Соломо́нович По́знер; 5 January 1905 in Paris – 19 February 1992 in Paris) was a French writer and translator of Russian-Jewish descent. His family fled the pogroms to take up residence in France. Pozner expanded on his inherited cultural socialism to associate both in writing and politics with anti-fascist and communist groups in the inter-war period. His writing was important because he made friends with internationally renowned exponents of hardline communism, while rejecting Soviet oppression.

== Youth ==
Born in Paris, to Russian-Jewish parents in 1905, after the first failed Bolshevik revolution, his father, Solomon Pozner, was a historian and an active emancipationist. A comrade of Rosa Luxemburg's group, he encouraged participation of Jews in Russian society, where possible. He joined the Society for Artisan Labour (better known as ORT, the acronym of its Russian name) and the Society for the Spread of the Enlightenment. His mother was Esther Siderski, who also joined these groups. A brother, George was born in 1908, later a Professor of Egyptology. The following year an amnesty allowed the family to return to St Petersburg, which in their absence was renamed Petrograd.

Pozner studied in Leningrad where he started working as a translator and journalist. On the outbreak of the Great War (World War 1) Russia's borders were closed, and the Jews trapped inside the pale of settlement. Little progress had been made by the Duma on civil and political rights for Jews in the early part of the 20th century. In 1917 the October Revolution passed by Victor's windows as a student, as he watched the streets below. A literary group known as 'The Brothers of Serapion' would gather in his parents' apartment in the city to read and discuss poetry. Frequent visitors were Viktor Shklovsky, Alexander Blok, Vladimir Mayakovsky, and Anna Akhmatova, the youngest of a famous conclave.

In 1921 the westernised Pozner returned to Paris, and began studies at the Sorbonne from 1922, where he met Irène Némirovsky. He began the first translations of Tolstoy and Dostoyevsky into French; in addition a variety of young Soviet writers including Isaac Babel, Vsevolod Ivanov, Lev Luntz, Alexey Tolstoy were contemporaries. On graduating he made a perilous journey to Berlin in search of his Russian friends, Maxim Gorky, Shklovsky, Mayakovsky. Germany remained the only country in Europe that would accept a Soviet passport. He got to know the novels of Boris Pasternak from Elsa Triolet.

Thus Vladimir Pozner became a Communist sympathizer while living in Europe. Many of the Russian-Jewish intelligentsia, such as Sliozberg and Horace Ginzberg, considered themselves Russian citizens, and saw no inconsistency of approach in faithfulness to Judaism with Russian-ness of the "russkie evrei". Ironically, the spread of this diaspora had the opposite effect, as it encouraged ideas of emigration and freedom. Jews were called on by socialist writer Hamlakah to "be a man on the streets."

Pozner married Elisabeth Makovska, a painter and photographer, in 1925. They had a daughter, Anne-Marie, known as Kissa, in 1927. A career in journalism was begun as he wrote for left wing papers, Regards, Vendredi, Marianne, Messidor, and for the literary review publications, Bifur, Europe, and NRF. One friend regularly visited was painter and interior-designer, Francis Jourdain, an older man whose work Vladimir admired. He published his first collection of Russian poetry in Paris in 1928, titled Poemes de Circonstances, based on being a Russian Jew in voluntary exile.

The following year Vladimir worked on submissions for Trianon, and published a Panorama of Russian Literature. Two years later, he published "Doistoievski et romans aventures," being the first to translate the great Russian novelist into French. He travelled to Italy to visit Gorky, at that time an exiled communist and critic of Soviet Russia, and stayed with him on the coast at Sorrento. He also became editor and secretary of Commune published by the Association of Revolutionary Writers and Artists, run by Paul Vaillant-Couturier, and got to collaborate with Louis Aragon, Paul Nizan, André Malraux, Philippe Soupault, André Gide, Jean Giono, Cartier-Bresson...

As Hitler came to power in Germany in the early 1930s, Pozner worked actively in the struggle to rescue refugees fleeing the Nazis, meeting the German composer Hanns Eisler, an anti-fascist refugee, with whom he formed a lifelong friendship. The writers Anna Seghers, and Ida Liebmann, German-Russian Jewish refugees from the Nazis, were also friends who required aid in the widespread murders and mass arrests of Communists in Germany after 1933, along with the loss of citizenship of all German Jews.

== International career ==
He remained an adherent of the Communist party largely on Gorki's advice; the famous writer had abandoned Italy in 1928 as it became a fascist dictatorship and was welcomed back to the USSR by Stalin. But Pozner stayed in Paris, primarily to fight fascism in Europe, and became French director of the Anti-fascist printing press, run by Alex Rado. In 1934, he set up the first Congress of Soviet writers in Moscow. This marked the last occasion he would see Gorki, who had been allowed out for this showcase. Pozner was numbered amongst the French delegation with Aragon, Jean-Richard Bloch, Malraux, Nizan and others. He wrote regularly to Gorki, who was his literary agent.

Later in 1934, Gorky was placed under house arrest in the USSR. The following year Pozner published his most well-known novel, Tolstoy is Dead (1935) which was adapted for theatre. He took part in the International Congress of Writers in defense of culture at Paris, with Mikhail Koltsov, a severe critic of the soviet bureaucratic state, who was later executed by Stalin.

Gorki's death, in 1936, was under very suspicious circumstances. Pozner travelled to the United States, to which he would return frequently in later life. At this point, he was conducting research for his polemic The Disunited States, published three years later. A second trip to the United States commenced with Ida in 1938.

When published, The Disunited States was a huge success, received with critical acclaim: a new point of view labelled as a major piece of French literature, later made into a film. After Franco triumphed in Spain, he continued to work for the release of republican prisoners detained without trial, turning his own memoirs into a novel in 1965, L'Espagne mon premier amour.

As Nazi panzers rolled into Paris, June 1940, he left Paris behind to join his family in Correze. He stayed with Arlette and Renaud de Jouvenel, his best friends. There they met Aragon, the Prevert brothers, Marcel Duhamel, and many other refugees, particularly Spanish republicans.

Thus the Gestapo found his Paris apartment empty. As a public anti-fascist, and militant Jewish communist, Pozner sought asylum in the United States, and was able to get this. (Quite possibly, the State Department, notoriously stingy with visas for Europeans fleeing Nazi occupation, already had their eye on him for future war work.) Leaving for New York, where his wife and family were waiting, they soon found themselves moving to California, he stayed at first in Berkeley with Barbara and Haakon Chevalier. Charpentier, the Hollywood director shot "Liberty Ships" at Richmond in the bay of San Francisco. He worked on several films with Berthold Brecht, Jons Ivens, George Sklar, Saika Viertel (starring Greta Garbo), with whom he remained friends. He was nominated for Oscars, most original screenplay, in The Dark Mirror, won by Robert Siodmak.

Pozner continued to write novels: Deuil en 24 heures was about the mass exodus from France in 1940.

== Postwar return to France ==
Leaving for France at the liberation in 1945 his book was released in French and English was immediately acclaimed by Dashiell Hammett, Erskine Caldwell, and Heinrich Mann. From his home in Paris, he began work on Les Gens du Pays, an adaptation of his novel with Marc Allégret. He would not renounce his communist affiliations without receiving an explanation, nor did he return in bad grace. Installed in the family apartment 52 Rue Mazarine, 6th Arrondissement, where he lived, until deciding to travel around the world. He made several trips to the United States.

On one occasion, with Ida, he welcomed his friends who were affected by McCarthyism, including Joseph Losey, John Berry, and Michael Wilson. He defended the Hollywood Ten in the press and criticized the film industry for blacklisting American screenwriters in response to anti-Communists.

He began a long collaboration with Brecht, Eisler, Ivens, Lillian Hellman, and Claude Roy. He submitted the screenplay for Le Point du jour to Louis Daquin in 1949. After several years in Hollywood, Pozner wanted to see filming done on location: and he went down into the northern coal mines. Cited as witness for the prosecution in the trial of Kravchenko, he excelled himself as a translator of French and Russian. He travelled a lot during this period, making films in Italy, Germany and Austria in 1950 alone. On his return he published Qui a tue H O Burrell?, a satire upon Pozner's own experiences of the Cold War, and the glacial foreign relations of the United States. Reunited with old friend Roger Vailland, they took the short stories of Guy de Maupassant. Several films followed to critical acclaim under studio supervision. From 1955 he worked for Brecht on Herr Puntila and His Servant Matti, directed by Alberto Cavalcanti.

== Restoration of Gorky ==
In 1957 the great Soviet novelist, Maxim Gorky, who had coached Pozner's precocious talents, was celebrated; since his death in 1936, he had been all but forgotten. Posner's book, Le Lieu du Supplice, was a chronicle of the Algerian wars, and was banned by the French military as a security risk. Lever du Rideau was an intimate novel about young love. A friend of Picasso declared "Now! That's a book!" And his editor, Rene Juillard, recalled "Dear friend, you have written a minor classic". He travelled to the Soviet Union for the first time since 1934, in search of his Russian friends. His outspoken writing against the war in Algeria, and several other articles, earned him a bomb explosion at his home from the OAS. On the same day, 7 Feb 1962, there were several other attempts, including one at Malraux's address, where a four-year-old girl was injured. There were riots and protests in Paris. On the Metro at Charonne, the Prefect of Police was charged with nine deaths. For a long time in a deep coma, Pozner remained on a respirator. He vowed to write voraciously in search of the truth. In 1967 he published Mille et un Jours in the footsteps of a long journey through the Soviet Union, Europe and Asia.

Some of his novels were books based on war activity and French Resistance;, his works also show his positions against fascism and nuclear weapons. He made friends with Brecht, Buñuel, Chagall, Oppenheimer and Picasso, and wrote about World War II, the Spanish Civil War and the Algerian War. A capable raconteur, in 1972 Pozner retold to his friends, including Buñuel, Chaplin, Oppenheimer, and Picasso, his mother acting as hostess, many stories over dinner. This was followed by a strange science-fiction novel, Mal de Lune. Pozner dedicated it to his granddaughter "for her to take care." He released a volume in 1977 containing five novels, with an important preface by Pierre-Jean Rémy. In collaboration with Jean Aurenche he released the film The Lady of the Camellias starring Isabelle Huppert. In 2014, Disunited States, a collection of Pozner's writings from his travels through the United States in the 1930s was published, being the English translation of Les États-Désunis (1938).

Pozner’s first cousin once removed, Vladimir Vladimirovich Pozner, enjoyed a career speaking internationally on behalf of Soviet agencies, and, after the collapse of the Soviet Union, came to be treated in the U.S., under the name Vladimir Posner (having Anglicized the surname), as an independent journalist.

== Novels ==
- Panorama de la littérature russe, 1929
- Anthologie de la prose russe contemporaine, 1929
- Tolstoï est mort, 1935; Christian Bourgois, editor 2010
- Le Mors aux dents, 1937; Actes Sud / Babel 2005
- Les États-Désunis, 1938; 2009. American translation : The Disunited States, Seven Stories Press, 2014
- Deuil en 24 heures (The Edge of the Sword), 1942
- Les Gens du pays, 1943
- First Harvest, 1943; Translated by Haakon Chevalier
- Qui a tué H. O. Burrell ?, 1952
- Souvenirs sur Gorki, 1957
- Le Lieu du supplice, 1959
- Le Lever du rideau, 1961
- Espagne premier amour, 1965
- Mille et un jours, 1967
- Le temps est hors des gonds, 1969
- Vladimir Pozner se souvient, 1972
- Mal de lune, 1974
- Descente aux enfers, 1980
- Les Brumes de San Francisco, 1985; Actes Sud / Babel 2006
- Le Fond des ormes, Actes Sud 1986
- Cuisine bourgeoise, Actes Sud 1988
- Souvenirs sur Aragon et Elsa : le Temps des cerises / SALAET 2001 (posthume)
