= Haakon Chevalier =

American translator, writer and academic (1901–1985)

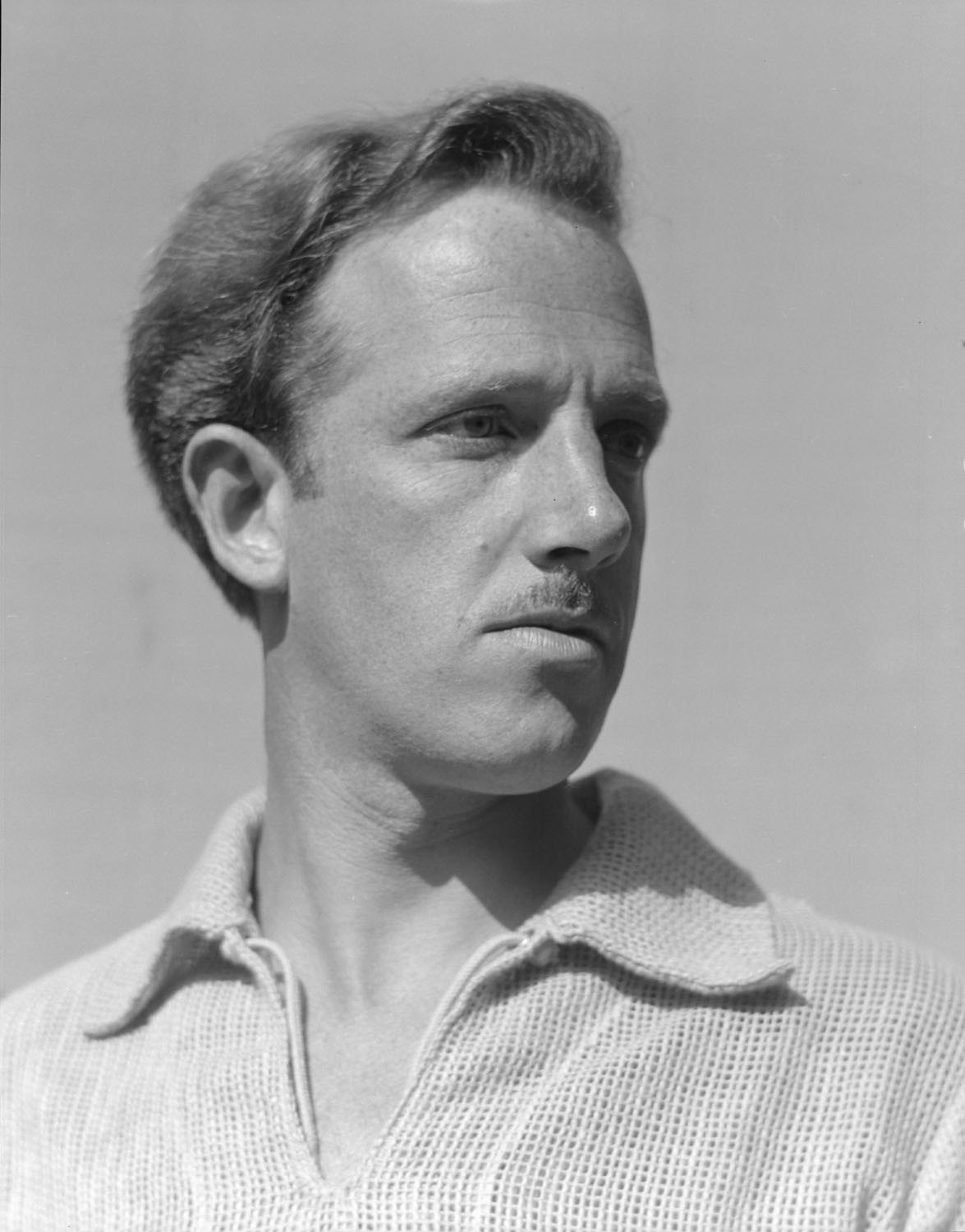
- Chevalier in 1935
- Born: Haakon Maurice Chevalier; September 10, 1901; Lakewood Township, New Jersey, U.S.
- Died: July 4, 1985 (aged 83); Paris, France
- Occupations: Writer; Translator; Academic
- Employer: University of California, Berkeley
- Spouses: Ruth Bosley (m. 1922–1931) Barbara Lansburgh (m. 1931–1950) Carol Lansburgh (m. 1952)
- Children: 4

Haakon Maurice Chevalier (September 10, 1901 – July 4, 1985) was an American writer, translator, and professor of French literature at the University of California, Berkeley perhaps best known for his friendship with physicist J. Robert Oppenheimer, whom he met at Berkeley, California in 1937.

Oppenheimer's relationship with Chevalier, and Chevalier's relationship with a possible recruiter for Soviet intelligence, figured prominently in a 1954 hearing of the U.S. Atomic Energy Commission on Oppenheimer's security clearance. At that hearing, Oppenheimer's security clearance was revoked.

== Early life ==
Chevalier was born September 10, 1901, in Lakewood Township, New Jersey to Emile and Therese Chevalier (née Roggen), who were of French and Norwegian ancestry, respectively.

When he was in his twenties Chevalier felt attracted by the romantic aspects of seafaring. He embarked as a deckhand on one of the last commercial sailing ships, the four-masted U.S. schooner Rosamond, for a voyage to the southern ocean and Cape Town. Chevalier wrote a vivid and nostalgic testimony of this end of the age of sail in his book The Last Voyage of the Schooner Rosamond.

== Translation work ==
In 1945, Chevalier served as a translator for the Nuremberg Trials. He translated works by Salvador Dalí, André Malraux, Vladimir Pozner, Louis Aragon, Frantz Fanon and Victor Vasarely into English.

== Relationship with Oppenheimer ==
Chevalier met Oppenheimer in 1937 at Berkeley while he was an associate professor of Romance languages. Together, Chevalier and Oppenheimer founded the Berkeley branch of a teachers' union, which provided benefits for leftist causes.

Chevalier informed Oppenheimer in 1942 of a discussion he had with George C. Eltenton that disturbed him considerably and that he thought Oppenheimer ought to know about. It was regarding Soviet attempts through Eltenton to penetrate the Manhattan Project. That short conversation, Oppenheimer's belated reporting of it, and attempts to obscure the identity of Chevalier, would later become one of the key issues in Oppenheimer's 1954 security hearing in front of the Atomic Energy Commission, which resulted in the revocation of his security clearance.

Chevalier was interviewed in The Day After Trinity (1981), an Oscar-nominated documentary about Oppenheimer and the atomic bomb. He was played by Peter Marinker in the 1980 miniseries Oppenheimer; by Graham Haley in the 1989 television film Day One; and by Jefferson Hall in Christopher Nolan's 2023 film Oppenheimer.

== Personal life ==
Chevalier had four children from three marriages. From 1922 to 1931 he was married to Ruth Bosley, from 1931 to 1950 to Barbara Lansburgh, and finally to Carol Lansburgh in 1952.

== Later life and death ==
After the House Subcommittee on Un-American Activities hearing, Chevalier lost his job at Berkeley in 1950. Unable to find another professorship in the United States, he moved to France, where he continued to work as a translator.

Chevalier returned to the United States briefly in July 1965, to attend his daughter's wedding in San Francisco.

Chevalier died in July 1985 in Paris at the age of 83. The cause of death was not reported.

== Works ==
- 1932. The Ironic Temper: Anatole France and His Time. Oxford University Press. ASIN B00085MTLU
- 1934. André Malraux and "Man's fate": An essay. H. Smith and R. Haas. ASIN B00089VCSC
- 1949. For Us The Living. New York: Alfred A. Knopf. ISBN 1-4179-8987-4
- 1959. The Man Who Would Be God. 1st American ed. Putnam. ASIN B0006AW3DG
- 1965. Oppenheimer: The Story of a Friendship. New York: George Braziller. ASIN B0006BN686
- 1970. The Last Voyage of the Schooner Rosamond. Deutsch. ISBN 0-233-96247-6

=== Translations ===
- Malraux, André. 1936. Days of Wrath. Random House
- Aragon, Louis. 1937. The Bells of Basel. London: Peter Davies & Lovat Dickson.
- Pozner, Vladimir. 1942. The Edge of the Sword (Deuil en 24 heures). Modern Age Books.
- Pozner, Vladimir. 1943. First Harvest (Les Gens du pays).
- Dalí, Salvador. 1944. Hidden Faces. Dial.
- Kessel, Joseph. 1944. Army of Shadows (L'Armée des ombres). Alfred A. Knopf
- Malraux, André. 1961. Man's Fate. Random House Modern Library. ASIN B000BI694M
- Aragon, Louis. 1961. Holy Week (La Semaine Sainte). Putnam. ASIN B000EWMJ3A
- Dalí, Salvador. 1986. The Secret Life of Salvador Dalí. Dasa Edicions ISBN 84-85814-12-6
- Maurois, André, 1962. Seven Faces of Love. Doubleday. ASIN B0007H6IX4
- Michaux, Henri. 1963. Light Through Darkness. Orion Press. ASIN B0007E4GJ0
- Vasarely, Victor. 1965. Plastic Arts of the Twentieth Century, Volume 1. Editions du Griffon. ASIN B000FH4NZG
- Fanon, Frantz. 1965. A Dying Colonialism.
- Fanon, Frantz. 1967. Toward the African Revolution.

== See also ==
- Oppenheimer security hearing
