= Detlev-Rohwedder-Haus =

Government office building in Berlin, Germany

Coordinates: 52°30′31.31″N 13°23′2.4″E

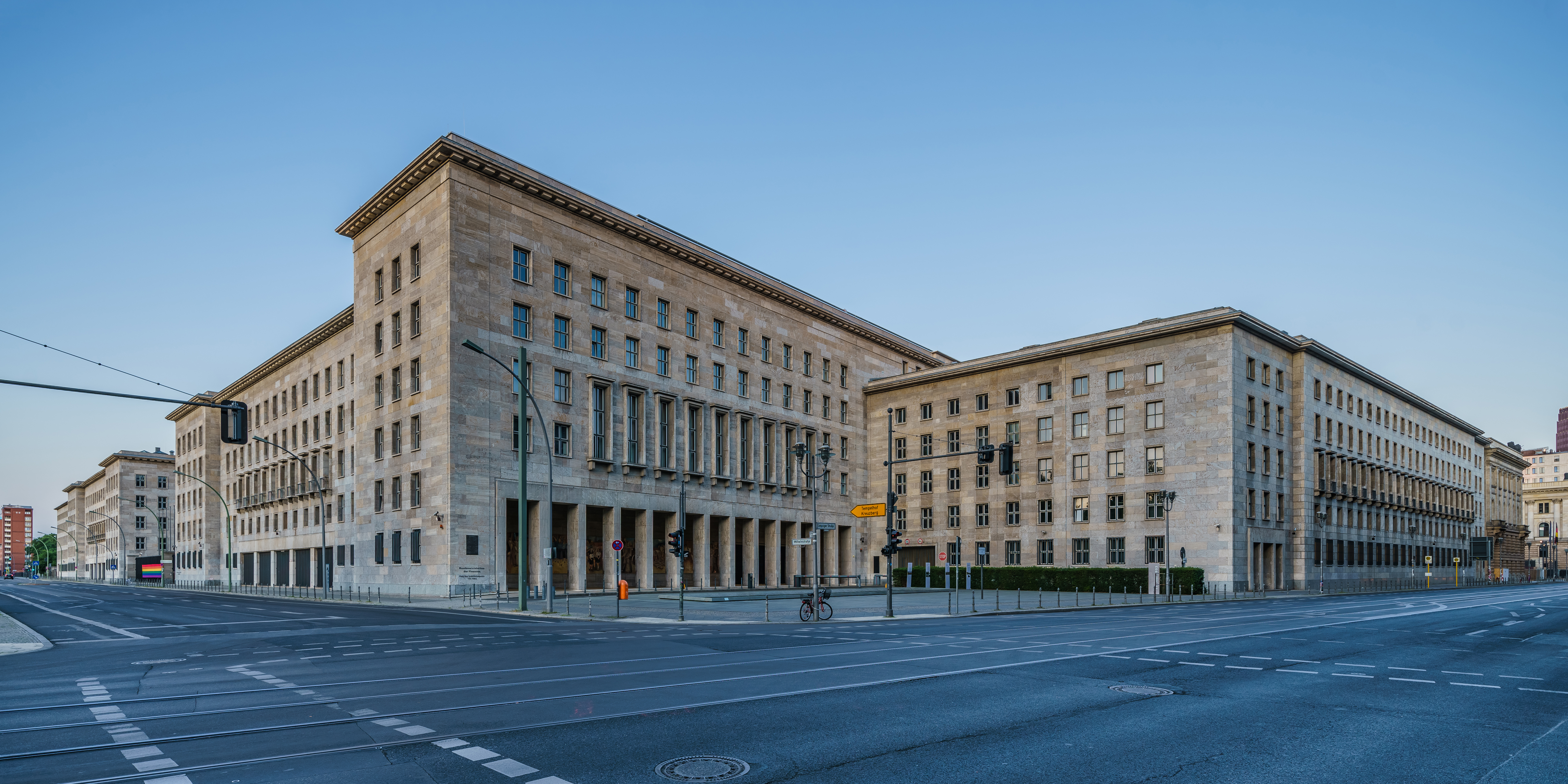
Detlev Rohwedder House in 2017

The Detlev-Rohwedder-Haus (Detlev Rohwedder House) is a building in Berlin that, at the time of its construction, was the largest office building in Europe. It was constructed between February 1935 and August 1936 to house the German Ministry of Aviation (German: Reichsluftfahrtministerium - RLM), headed by Hermann Göring.

During the German Democratic Republic (East Germany) it was known as the Haus der Ministerien ("House of Ministries"). In 1992, it was named the Detlev Rohwedder Building, in honour of Detlev Karsten Rohwedder, the former President of the Treuhand, which had its headquarters there 1991–1995, who was assassinated by far-left terrorist group Red Army Faction in 1991. Since 1999, the building has been the seat of the German Finance Ministry.

== Design and construction ==
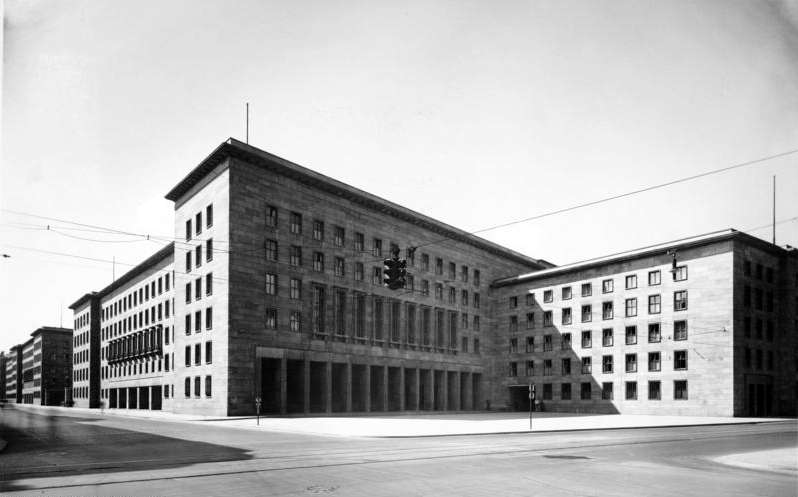
The Air Ministry Building, December 1938

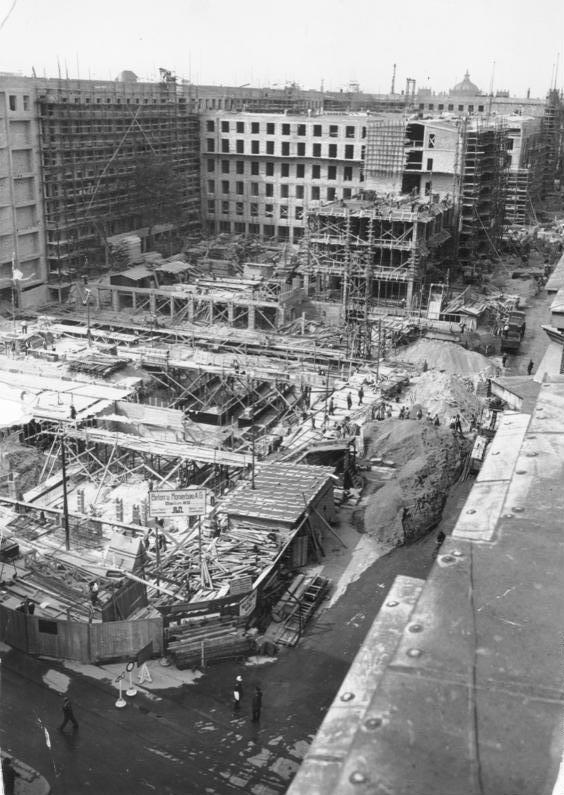
Construction of the Air Ministry Building, 1935

The building was designed by Ernst Sagebiel, who rebuilt Tempelhof Airport on a similarly gigantic scale. One writer has described it as "in the typical style of National Socialist intimidation architecture." It ran for more than 250 metres (820 ft) along Wilhelmstraße, partly on the site of the former Prussian War Ministry dating from 1819, and covered the full length of the block between Prinz-Albrecht-Straße and Leipziger Straße, even running along Leipziger Straße itself to join onto the Prussian House of Lords, today housing the Bundesrat. It comprised a reinforced concrete skeleton with an exterior facing of limestone and travertine.

With its seven storeys and total floor area of 112,000 square metres (1,210,000 sq ft), 2,800 rooms, 7 kilometres (4.3 mi) of corridors, over 4,000 windows, 17 stairways, and with the stone coming from no fewer than 50 quarries, the vast building served the growing bureaucracy of the Luftwaffe, plus Germany's civil aviation authority which was also located there. Yet it took only 18 months to build, the army of labourers working double shifts and Sundays. The first 1,000 rooms were handed over in October 1935 after just eight months' construction. When completed, 4,000 bureaucrats and their secretaries were employed within its walls. Goring’s office floor was reinforced with extra support to prevent collapse.

=== Post-war ===
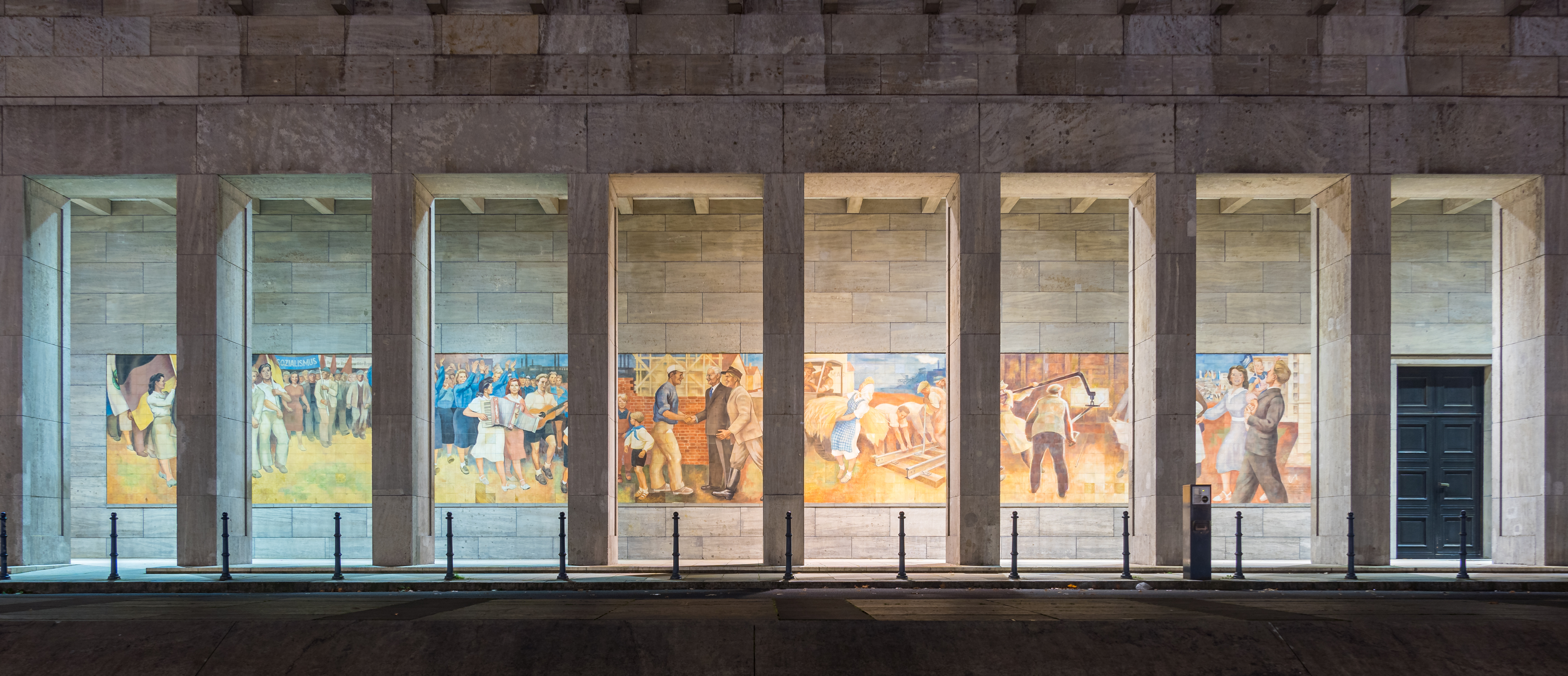
Panorama of the GDR-era Max Lingner mural

The Air Ministry building was one of the few Nazi public buildings in central Berlin to escape serious damage during the Allied bombing offensive in 1944–45. After World War II ended in Europe, the huge structure was quickly repaired, with only the Ehrensaal (Hall of Honour) being substantially altered. It was remodelled into the Stalinist neo-classicist Festsaal (Festival Hall), with the enormous Eagle and Swastika that had adorned its end wall being removed.

Once the work was complete, the building was used by the Soviet military administration until 1948, and from 1947 until 1949 by the German Economic Commission (Deutsche Wirtschaftskommission or DWK), which became the top administrative body in the Soviet Occupation Zone. At that time it became officially known as Haus der DWK ("House of the 'DWK'"). On 7 October 1949, the German Democratic Republic (GDR) was founded in a ceremony in the Festsaal, with Wilhelm Pieck as President and Otto Grotewohl as Prime Minister (Ministerpräsident). Later the building served the Council of Ministers of the GDR and other affiliated organizations of the GDR, hence its new name Haus der Ministerien (House of the Ministries).

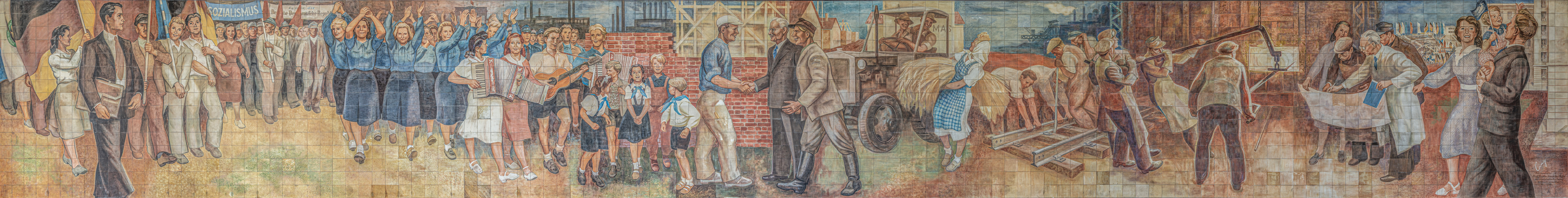
The GDR-era Max Lingner mural

Between 1950 and 1952 an extraordinary 18 metres (59 ft) long mural, made out of Meissen porcelain tiles, was created at the north end along Leipziger Straße, set back behind pillars. Created by the German painter and commercial artist Max Lingner together with 14 artisans, it depicts the Socialist ideal of contented East Germans facing a bright future as one big happy family. In fact the mural's creation was a somewhat messy affair. Commissioned by the Prime Minister, Otto Grotewohl, Lingner had had to revise it no fewer than five times, so that it ultimately bore little resemblance to the first draft. Originally based on family scenes, the final version had a more sinister look about it, a series of jovial set-pieces with an almost military undertone, people in marching poise and with fixed, uniform smiles on their faces. Lingner hated it (as well as Grotewohl's interference) and refused to look at it when going past. With a degree of irony, the building became the focal point a year later of the Uprising of 1953 in East Germany.

=== After reunification ===
From 1991–95, after German reunification, it housed the Treuhand (Trust Establishment), which privatised former enterprises operated by the East German government. Its first chairman, Detlev Rohwedder, was murdered by Red Army Faction terrorists on 1 April 1991, and on 16 January 1992, the building was renamed the Detlev Rohwedder House (German: Detlev-Rohwedder-Haus) in his honour. From 1990, the Berlin branch office of the German Finance Ministry was also located there, and since 1999, following extensive refurbishment, the building has served as the Ministry's headquarters.

At the north (Leipziger Straße) end of the building, a plaque commemorates the protest meeting of 16 June 1953, from which stemmed the following day's East German uprising of 1953. In 1993, the nearby 1950s Lingner mural was joined by another scene set into the ground nearby: a huge blown-up photograph of 1953 protesters shortly before their gathering was suppressed.

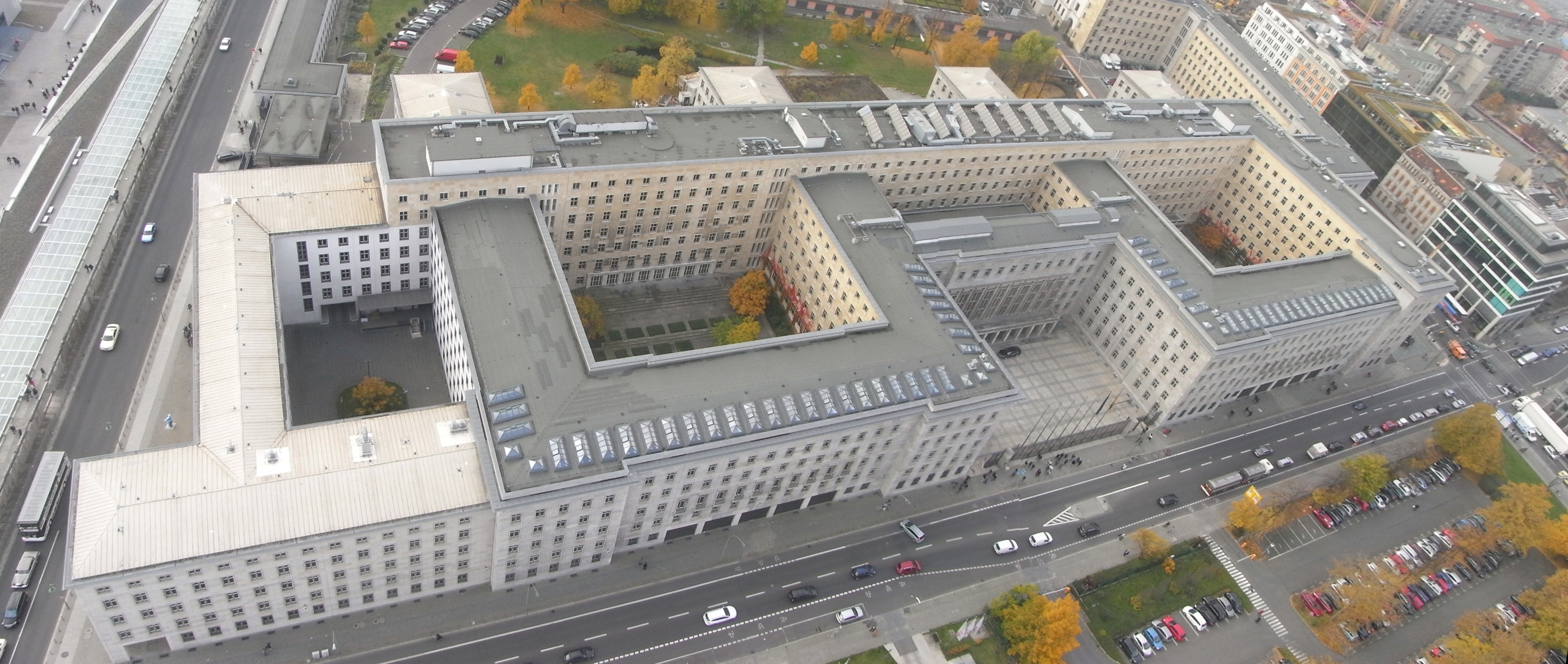
Aerial view showing the vast extent of the building
