= Anne-Marie Marchand =

French costume designer (1927–2005)

- Born: 27 May 1927
- Died: 1 July 2005 (aged 78)
- Occupation: Costume designer
- Years active: 1956 - 1988

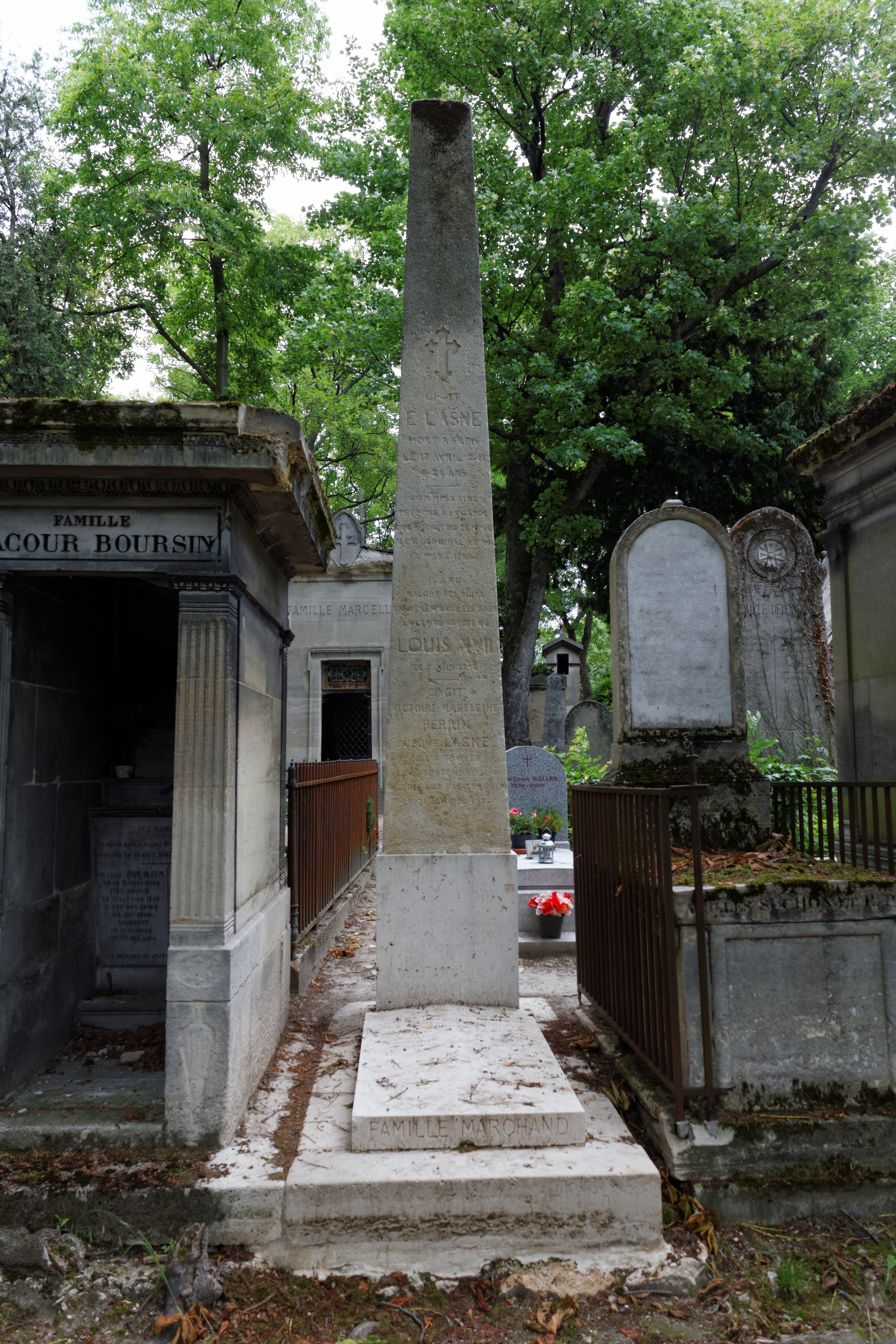
Grave of Anne-Marie Marchand

Anne-Marie Marchand (27 May 1927 – 1 August 2005) was a French costume designer, daughter of the author Vladimir Pozner. She was nominated for the Academy Award for Best Costume Design for her work in the film The Return of Martin Guerre (1982). She was buried at the Père Lachaise cemetery in the grave of François Étienne Lasné.
