= Fitzwater Wray =

English cycling journalist

William Fitzwater Wray (1869 – 16 December 1938), who wrote under the pseudonym Kuklos, was a British journalist who was one of the most widely read cycling journalists of his era. He wrote in national newspapers in Britain and in cycling journals. Through his writing ran the conviction that "on every real bicycle there is the unseen pennant of progress, the standard of democracy, (and) the banner of freedom." He also gave magic lantern shows, predecessor of slide shows, which were in demand in the 1920s and 1930s and to which cyclists rode "prodigious distances."

== History ==
Wray was born in Hitchin, the third son of the Reverend Samuel Wray, a Methodist minister in Sacton, west of Beverley, in the East Riding of Yorkshire. His mother was Ann (née Fitzwater), of Laleham, Middlesex. He was educated at church boarding schools: the Kingswood School in Bath and Woodhouse Grove on the edge of Bradford. He did not share his father's religious belief, however, writing in 1896: "While still at boarding-school I revolted from the orthodox Christianity (sub-section Dissent) into which I was born and brought up... So I have never been since (to Church), except to temples not made with hands".

He hired his first bicycle, a safety bicycle with solid tyres, when he was 17 in 1887 His first ride was from Bradford to Otley and back. At his father’s insistence he then set out to tour England, an experience his father thought useful before his son started work. Wray bought a solid-tyred penny-farthing - the large-wheeled bicycle that the safety had replaced – and set out on that with no luggage and little money, sleeping rough when he had to or staying with friends and relatives. He rode between 700 and 800 miles. The experience guided the rest of his life.

His father died while Wray was having what would now be called a gap year and he started work as a lithographic artist, then a photo etcher and pen draughtsmen in Bradford and began writing the first of his cycling columns for the Bradford Observer. He joined the Yorkshire Road Club.

In 1907, he married Emily Gertrude Fisher, known as Klossie, and together they toured all Britain and continental Europe.

He left Bradford in his 20s to work for the Daily News, a national newspaper in London that was absorbed by the News Chronicle. He wrote there for 25 years before joining the Daily Herald, where he wrote weekly until a few days before his death. He often mentioned Bradford and the Yorkshire Dales. From 1894, he began using the byline Kuklos (the Greek word for a wheel, or circle but also used for a circle of poems) and by the following year earned enough to live as a writer. While in London, he joined the North Road Cycling Club, one of the country’s oldest.

== Opinions ==
Wray was a man of independent and firm opinions. George Herbert Stancer, the president of the Cyclists’ Touring Club, described him as the cyclist’s "doughtiest champion." The Bicycle called him "an individualist, and even those who disagreed with his opinions had to admit the sincerity of his beliefs." He wrote "with a sincerity so strong as to become almost violent."

One of his campaigns was against a cycling institution which attracted thousands, the annual service for cyclists killed in the First World War, held at a memorial on the green at Meriden in the English Midlands. His article, Mendacious Meriden, upset many but was often reprinted.

== Picture shows ==
Wray and other cycling tourists such as W. M. Robinson and Neville Whall, who used the names Wayfarer and Hodites, were in demand for their picture shows in the 1920s and 1930s and cyclists would travel "prodigious distances" to see them. Wray took his pictures on glass slides three inches by three inches. He arranged them into sequences with names such as Wildest Britain, The Irish Paradise, A Cyclist in Lighter Vein and Old Inns and Nature and Novelist. The tradition and the slides died out with the start of the Second World War and the advent of 35mm transparency film.

Wray's pictures passed on some years after his death to George Herbert Stancer, the secretary of the Cyclists Touring Club and then to a Norfolk enthusiast, Les Reason. They are now held at the national cycle archive at Warwick University.

== Books ==
Collections of his writing were published as books, notably A Vagabond's Note-Book (1908) and The Kuklos Papers (1927). Other works included The Visitors Book (1937), observations collected from hotel visitors' books. Earlier he wrote a series of articles for the Daily News about cycling in war torn France during the first part of World War I. These were collected together in Across France in Wartime, published in J.M.Dent's Wayfarer's Library in 1916. In 1916 he translated Le Feu (English: Under Fire: The Story of a Squad), a novel by the French communist, Henri Barbusse.

== Death ==
Wray died on 16 December 1938 while under anaesthetic in the operating room of a London hospital. He was given a non-religious funeral at a crematorium in London, witnessed in heavy snow by "a handful of Kuklos’s personal friends, men and women famous in the cycling world, to whom their departed comrade had been the inspiration of many of their beliefs and ambitions." He asked for no mourning and no flowers.

Emily Wray submitted a tribute to her husband at the request of The Bicycle. She wrote:

He does not die that can bequeath

Some influence to the land he knows

That dares, persistent interwreath

Love permanent with the wild hedgerows.

He rides the loud October sky.

He does not die – He does not die.
