= Hell (Barbusse novel) =

- 1956 Chapman & Hall Reissue
- Author: Henri Barbusse
- Original title: L'Enfer
- Language: French
- Published: 1908
- English publication date: 1918

Hell (French: L'Enfer) is Henri Barbusse's second novel, written in 1908, in which the unnamed narrator spies on his fellow house guests through a peephole in his wall.

== Plot summary ==
The narrator, unmarried and friendless, books a room in a Paris boarding house. By chance he finds a hole in his wall, through which he can see the adjoining room and its inhabitants. From the other side, he witnesses lesbianism, adultery, incest, thievery, vicious proselytizing and death, musing to the reader on the philosophical implications of the events he witnesses. His voyeurism eventually convinces him to quit his room and find a fulfilling life of his own, but as he attempts to leave he is crippled with backache and blindness.

== Literary criticism ==
Hell was notably popular and widely discussed in France, selling more than a hundred thousand copies in 1917 alone. Colin Wilson gave considerable attention to Barbusse's novel in his influential work The Outsider.

== English translations ==
L'Enfer has been translated into English several times, first as The Inferno by Edward J. O'Brien for Boni and Liveright in 1918 in a heavily abridged form, then again as The Inferno by John Rodker for Joiner & Steele in 1932, and then in full as Hell by Robert Baldick for Chapman and Hall in 1966 – later reissued by Turtle Point Press in 1995.

== See also ==
- Voyeurism
- Octave Mirbeau
