= Paul Vaillant-Couturier =

French writer and politician (1892–1937)

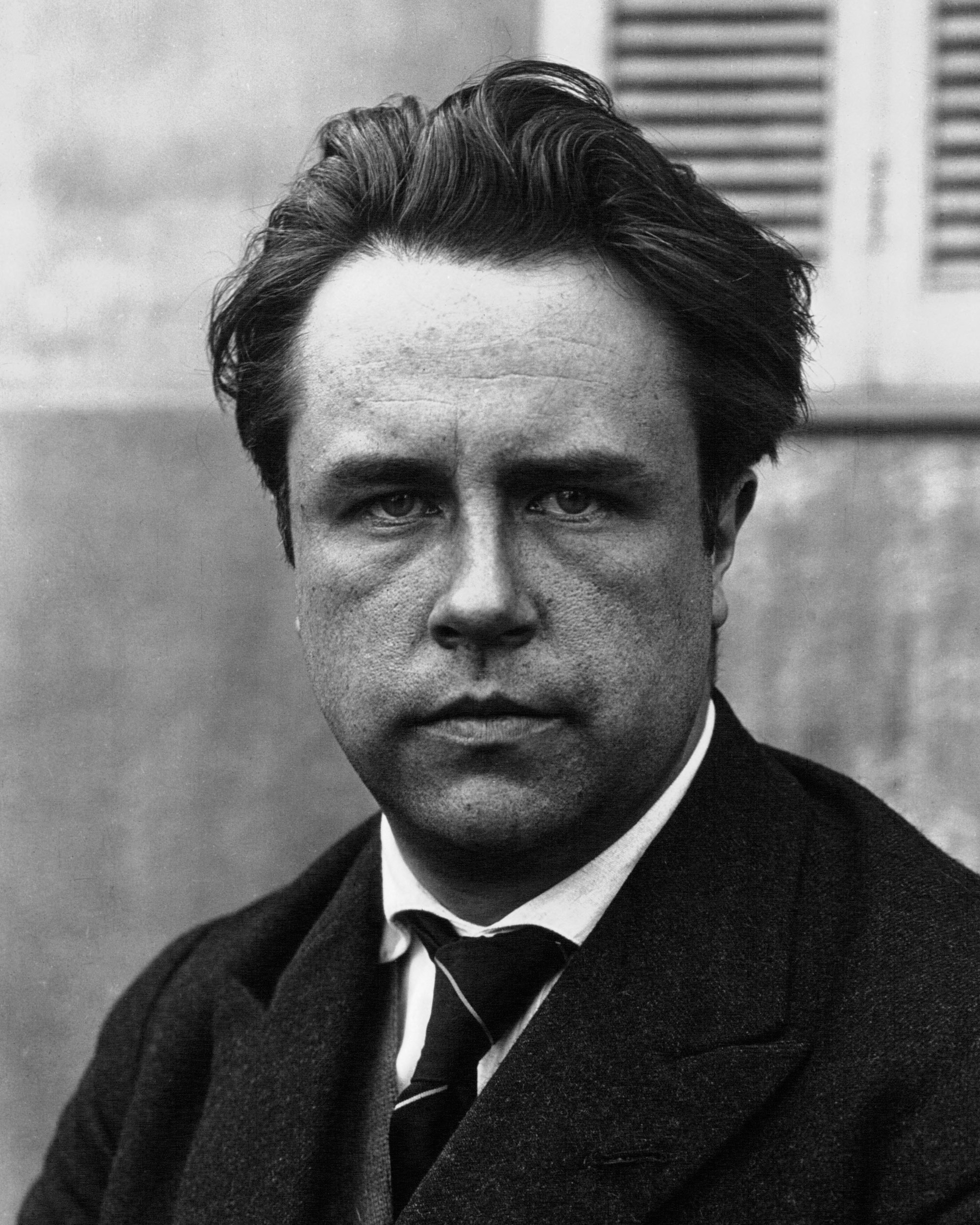
Paul Vaillant-Couturier in 1921

Paul Vaillant-Couturier (French pronunciation: [pɔl vajɑ̃ kutyʁje]; 8 January 1892 – 10 October 1937) was a French writer, journalist and communist politician. He participated in the founding of the French Communist Party (PCF) in 1920.

== Biography ==
Born into a family of actors, Vaillant-Couturier studied law at the University of Paris. From 1914 until 1918 he fought in World War I. He joined the French Section of the Workers' International in 1916, and was a member of the party's internationalist left wing. In 1917, together with Henri Barbusse and Raymond Lefebvre, Vaillant-Couturier participated in the founding of the Association républicaine des anciens combattants ('Republican Association of Former Frontline Soldiers'), a radical veterans' organization.

He wrote of his experiences during the war in several of his works, such as La Guerre des soldats and Une permission de détente from 1919 and in the poetry collection Trains rouges from 1923.

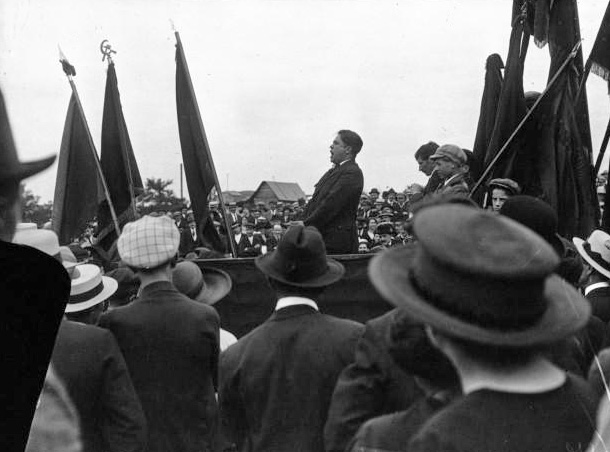
Vaillant-Couturier speaking during a demonstration, 1922

In 1920, Vaillant-Couturier was a founding member of the French Communist Party (PCF). In 1921, he was elected to the Central Committee, and later to the Politburo of the Central Committee of the PCF. He was also a delegate of the party to the Third Congress of the Comintern, held in Moscow in 1921. Vaillant-Couturier was re-elected a deputy for Paris in 1924 and served as editor in chief of L'Humanité, the central organ of the PCF, between 1926 and 1929 and again from 1935 until his death in 1937. In 1932, he participated in the founding of Association des Écrivains et Artistes Révolutionnaires, an association of revolutionary writers and artists.

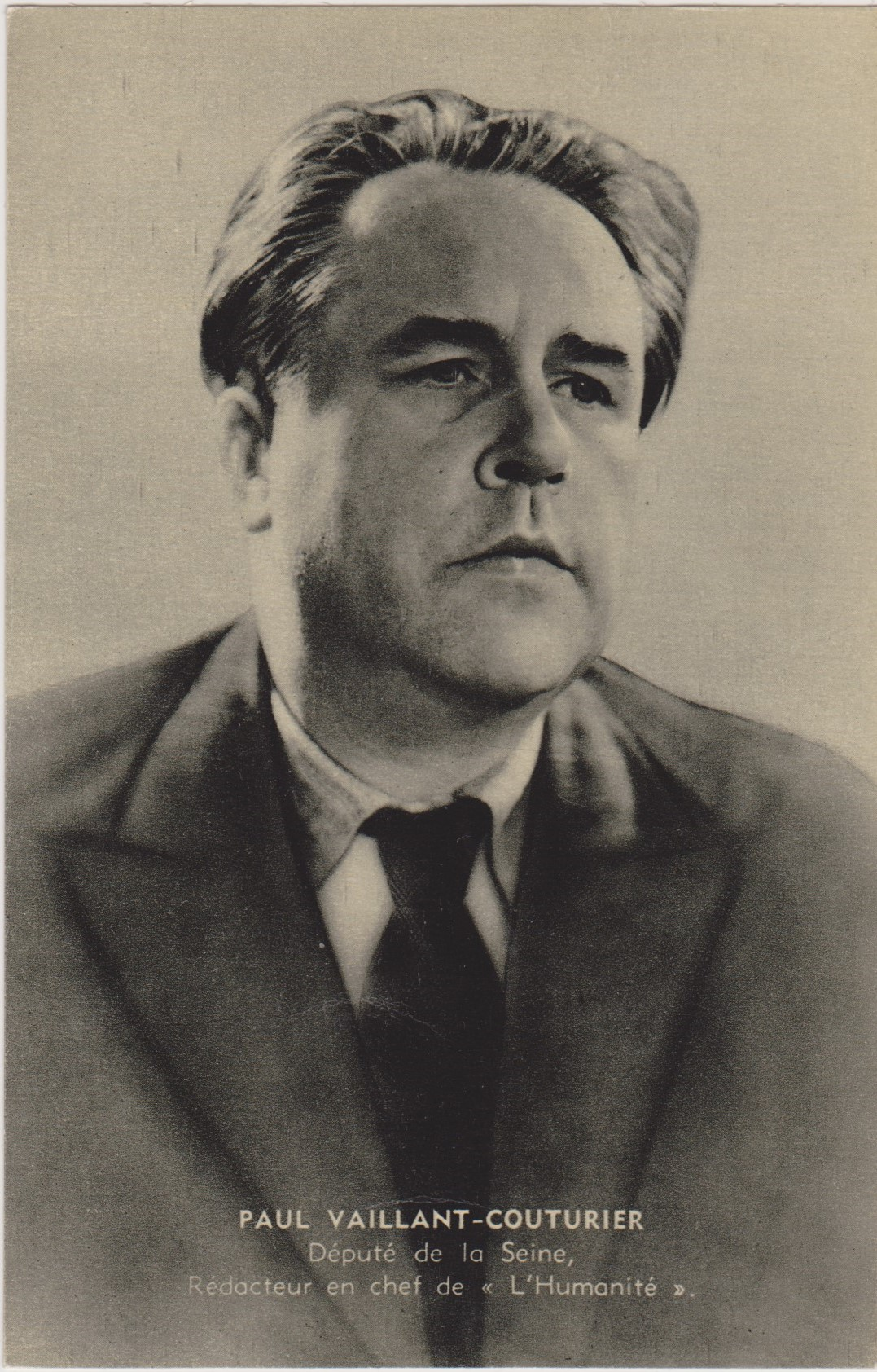
Postcard presenting Paul Vaillant-Couturier, published in 1937 by the newspaper l'Humanité.

Vaillant-Couturier spent much time in the Soviet Union, and worked at the Comintern headquarters in Moscow in 1931–1932. In 1933 he visited the Far East and met with Ho Chi Minh and other members of the Comintern's Far Eastern apparatus in Shanghai.

He lost the 1928 and 1932 parliamentary elections, but was elected a deputy again at the time of the Popular Front in 1936. As a journalist, Vaillant-Couturier made trips to China and Spain before his sudden death in 1937; his funeral was attended by thousands of people.

From 1934 until his death, Paul Vaillant-Couturier was married to Marie-Claude Vaillant-Couturier.

== Works ==
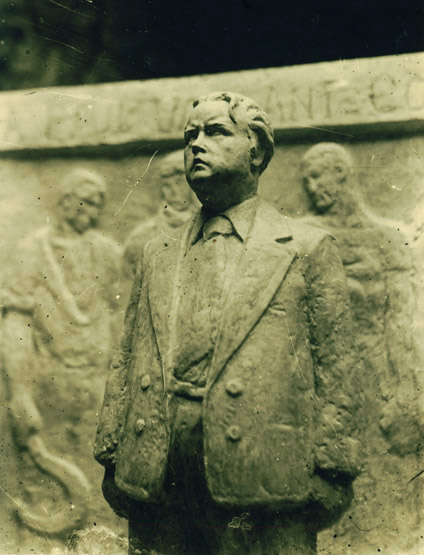
Paul Vaillant-Couturier by the sculptor Victor Nicolas (plaster model, 1950).

- La Visite du berger, Éditions du temps - Paris. 1913. OCLC 66588249
- La guerre des soldats : le champ d'honneur conseils de guerre aux armées l'hopital, Ernest Flammarion, 1919. OCLC 13213988
- Lettres à mes amis (1918-1919). Ernest Flammarion. 1920. OCLC 21532329
- Jean sans pain, histoire pour tous les enfants, Paris, Clarté, 1921. OCLC 14109480
- Trains rouges, poèmes, Paris, Clarté, 1922. OCLC 6231706
- Un mois dans Moscou la rouge, Paris, Éditions des reportages populaires, 1926. OCLC 46322978
- Le Bal des aveugles, Ernest Flammarion, 1927. OCLC 11012392
- Le Père Juillet, Léon Moussinac et Paul Vaillant-Couturier, Paris, Au sans-pareil, 1927. OCLC 31999717
- Trois conscrits; Le monstre; Asie, Paris : Bureau d'éditions, 1929. OCLC 30638157
- Les bâtisseurs de la vie nouvelle, neuf mois de voyage dans l'U.R.S.S. du plan quinquennal, Paris : Bureau d'éditions, 1932. OCLC 34316121
- Le malheur d'être jeune, Paris : Éditions nouvelles, 1935. OCLC 12335828
- Enfance : Souvenirs d'enfance et de jeunesse, Paris : Éd. sociales internationales, 1938. OCLC 156096464
- Nous ferons se lever le jour, Paris : Ed. d'Hier et d'Aujourd'hui, 1947. OCLC 6903324
- Histoire d'âne pauvre et de cochon gras, Paris : Éditions la Farandole, 1956. OCLC 26064058
- Vers les lendemains qui chantent, Paris, Éditions sociales, 1962. OCLC 3520159

== Bibliography ==
- La Vie ardente de Paul Vaillant-Couturier : quelques images de sa mémoire radieuse, Éditions de L'Humanité, 1937
- Fernande Bussières, Paul Vaillant-Couturier ou histoire d'une amitié, Éditions Subervie, 1979.
- Jean Maitron (Dir.), Dictionnaire biographique du Mouvement Ouvrier Français, Editions de l'Atelier, 1994. Notice rédigée par Annie Burger-Roussennac.
- Jean-Michel Leterrier, Paul Vaillant-Couturier : responsabilité politique et imagination culturelle, Éditions Les points sur les i, 2007.
- René Ballet, Choix de textes de Paul Vaillant-Couturier, Éditions du Réveil des combattants, 1992.
- Paul Vaillant-Couturier : l'humanité libre, L'Humanité, Hors-série du 3 juillet 2012.
