= La Semaine Sainte =

1958 novel by Louis Aragon

Holy Week
- First English-language edition
- Author: Louis Aragon
- Original title: La Semaine Sainte
- Translator: Haakon Chevalier
- Cover artist: Philip Gough
- Language: French
- Genre: Historical novel
- Publisher: Hamish Hamilton (UK); G.P. Putnam's Sons (US)
- Publication date: 1958
- Publication place: France
- English publication date: 1961
- Media type: Print
- Pages: 467

La Semaine Sainte is an historical novel by French writer Louis Aragon published in 1958. It sold over 100,000 copies.

An English translation by Haakon Chevalier was published in 1961 under the title Holy Week by Hamish Hamilton, London, to mixed reviews:

"It is a very bad book, so bad that one doesn't want to write about it, and if it weren't by Aragon, France's according-to-blurb "leading poet-novelist", one wouldn't....The translation, incidentally, is execrable throughout."

"Although the novel lacks the warmth of War and Peace and never makes us care very deeply for any of the characters, it displays a splendid range of intellectual understanding. The only recent book worthy to be compared with this tremendous panorama is Dr. Zhivago. M. Aragon's vision seems to me no less poetic than Pasternak's, and his technique as a novelist is far superior."

== Plot ==
The book covers the week of 19 to 26 March 1815, when Napoleon Bonaparte, after escaping from captivity on the island of Elba, sought to regain power from the French King Louis XVIII. The main character in the novel, the painter Théodore Géricault, who has renounced his artistic career for a military one, accompanies the king on his flight from Paris, but as the king continues to flee across the frontier into Belgium, Géricault begins to have doubts about his own loyalties and the implications of his potential choices.

== Analysis ==
The novel begins with a strange 'Author's Note': "This is not a historical novel. Any resemblance to persons who have lived, any similarity in names, places, details, can be an effect only of pure coincidence, and the Author declines responsibility for this in the name of the Inalienable Rights of the Imagination". Yet is it very definitely an historical novel, using real persons and real incidents, including the author himself and events in his own life, as well as those invented by the author's imagination.

The novel is rich in history, blending real persons and events with fictional ones. It swaps back and forth between characters, portraying their divided loyalties, and the confusion of the period. All the characters need to make a decision sooner or later as to which side to support, and what action to take: to run or fight, to run for England or Belgium, to fight for the king or for Napoleon, to save themselves, their possessions, their livelihoods or their country. Their emotions, past histories, and present fears are recreated well.

Aragon does not simply tell a simple narrative. Many of the characters have flashbacks, and even flashforwards (such as that which details the mysterious death by defenestration of Marshal Berthier in June 1815), that are introduced suddenly, without warning or introduction. Likewise, Aragon manifests himself in the novel by directly addressing the reader as himself in several digressions: he recalls his own experiences during the French occupation of Germany in 1919, during the German invasion of France in 1940, his (and his wife's) experiences and memories of Bamberg. Less personally, after describing a royalist officer raping a peasant girl, he discusses his reasons for not naming the soldier, describing the progeny of the soldier down to the present day, and explaining that he does not wish to shame the present, real, family descended from this soldier.

As part of the narrative, Aragon also discusses the political and economic policies of both Napoleon and Louis XVIII reminding the reader that the decision of whom to support was not black and white. Napoleon was liberal and forward thinking with regard to agricultural and industrial development, but his constant conscription of workers and peasants into his armies had stripped many villages of their male workforce, who returned crippled, if at all, and his wars had reduced opportunities for trade, particularly with England, destroying the industries he otherwise tried to develop. In contrast, the king's reactionary policies and the return of the aristocracy after Napoleon' exile had embittered the peasantry, but at least there were jobs and stability and peace and trade. Napoleon's return threatened new upheavals, not only within France, but also the possibility of invasion by forces from Prussia, Russia, Austria and England. How each character, historic or fictitious, reacts to these contradictions and dilemmas forms the meat of the novel. The novel ends with Théodore Géricault seeing no point in dying either for a crippled king who has fled the country, nor for supporting Napoleon and his imperial police state. Having seen the royal family across the frontier into Belgium, he feels his duty is completed and he decides to return as anonymously as possible to Paris and his former artistic career.
