= Monde (review) =

Defunct French magazine

- Former editors: Augustin Habaru
- Categories: Political magazine Cultural magazine
- Frequency: Weekly
- Founder: Henri Barbusse
- Founded: 1928
- First issue: 9 June 1928
- Final issue: 1935
- Country: France
- Based in: Paris
- Language: French

Monde was a weekly French international communist magazine. The magazine featured articles about international culture and politics. It was published in Paris, France, from 1928 until 1935, the year of the death of its founder, the writer Henri Barbusse.

== History and profile ==
The first issue of Monde appeared on 9 June 1928. The magazine was started as an alternative to mainstream communist publications in France. Henri Barbusse was the founder of the magazine which was published on a weekly basis. He also served as the director of the magazine. Augustin Habaru was the first editor-in-chief. The magazine had its headquarters in Paris.

Monde had an editorial board of which the members were elected by the stakeholders of the Societe Anonyme Monde. The magazine published some articles by George Orwell while he was living in Paris including his first article as a professional writer, "La Censure en Angleterre", which appeared on 6 October 1928.
