= Henri Barbusse =

French novelist and writer (1873–1935)

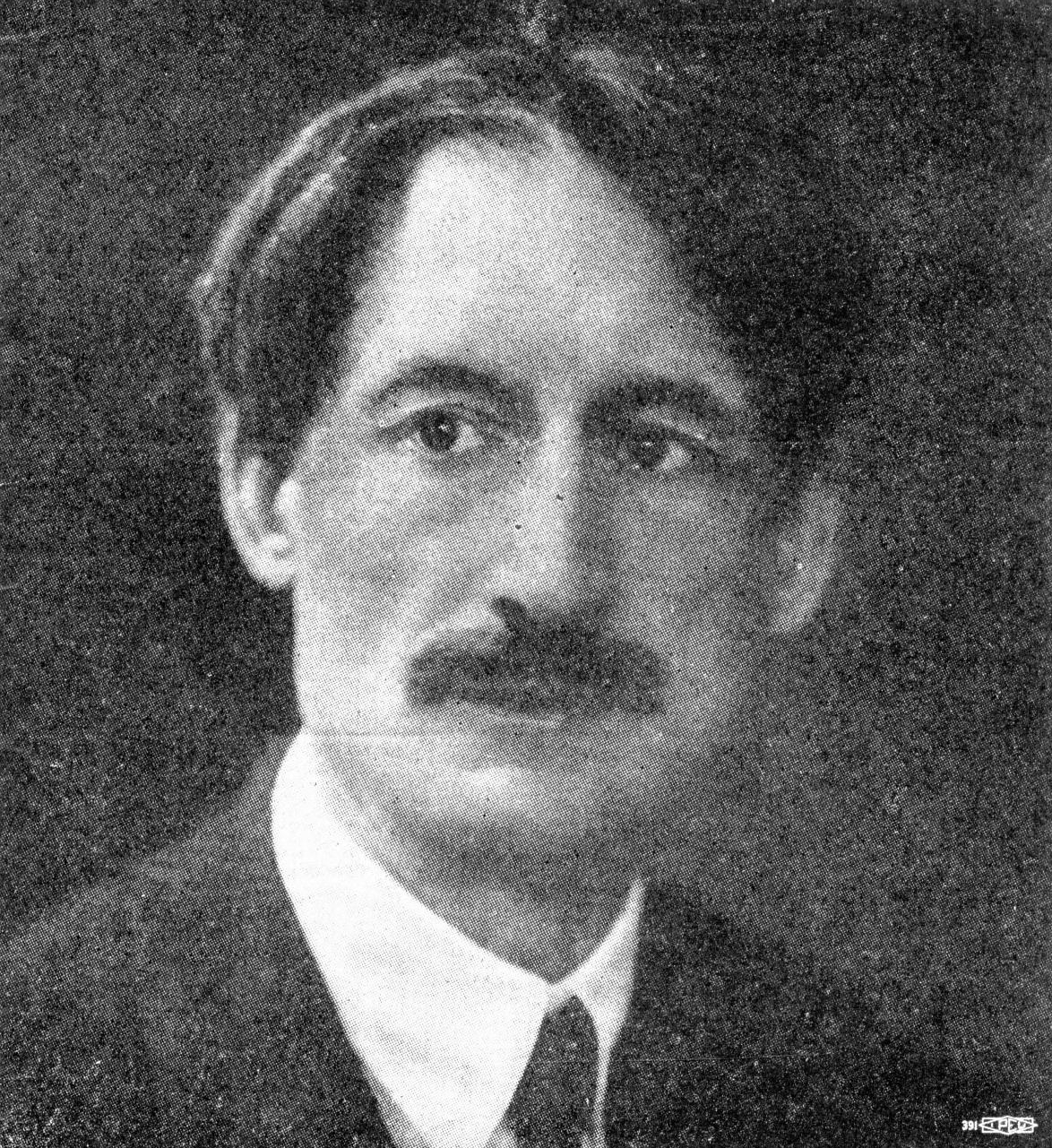
- Barbusse c. 1926
- Born: Adrien Gustave Henri Barbusse; 17 May 1873; Asnières-sur-Seine, France
- Died: 30 August 1935 (aged 62); Moscow, Russian SFSR
- Occupations: Writer, poet, journalist
- Spouse: Helyonne Holmès (m. 1898)
- Relatives: Catulle Mendès (father-in-law); Augusta Holmès (mother-in-law)
- Writing career
- Period: 1895–1935
- Genres: Novel, short story, poetry, biography, opinion journalism
- Notable work: Under Fire

Henri Barbusse (French: [ɑ̃ʁi baʁbys]; 17 May 1873 – 30 August 1935) was a French novelist, short story writer, journalist, poet and political activist. He began his literary career in the 1890s as a Symbolist poet and continued as a neo-Naturalist novelist; in 1916, he published Under Fire, a novel about World War I based on his experience which is described as one of the earliest works of the Lost Generation movement or as the work which started it; the novel had a major impact on the later writers of the movement, namely on Ernest Hemingway and Erich Maria Remarque. Barbusse is considered one of the important French writers of 1910–1939 who mingled the war memories with moral and political meditations.

Before World War I, Barbusse was a pacifist, but in 1914, he volunteered for wartime service and was awarded the Croix de guerre; during the war, he was influenced by the Communists and came to the belief that a Revolution against the imperialist governments would be the only quick way to end the war and to deal with militarism and reaction. In years following the war, his work acquired a definite political orientation; he became a member of the French Communist Party and an anti-fascist and anti-war activist. In the 1930s, he supported the Stalinist regime despite having a friendly relationship with Leon Trotsky in the middle of the 1920s and contributed to Joseph Stalin's personality cult by writing his biography, which became a 'canonical' text for the French Stalinists but was not in line with the glorification of Stalin in the USSR. He died in 1935 and did not see the events that followed, like the Moscow trials and the Nazi-Soviet pact.

He was a lifelong friend of Albert Einstein.

== Life ==
=== Early life and career ===
Barbusse was born on 17 May 1873 in Asnières-sur-Seine to Adrien Barbusse and Anne Benson. Barbusse's father was French and his mother was English. Although he grew up in a small town, he left for Paris in 1889, at age 16. In 1895, he published a poetry collection Mourners (Pleureuses), which is sometimes identified as "neo-Symbolist". On 18 April 1898, Barbusse married Helyonne Holmès, the daughter of the poet Catulle Mendès and the composer Augusta Holmès, in Croissy-sur-Seine.

In 1908, Barbusse wrote his first novel Hell (L'Enfer), in which he described the life of a young Parisian who lives in a boarding house and spies through a hole in his wall on the other boarders and sees birth, death, adultery and lesbianism. The novel produced controversy because of breaking taboos and crossing conventional moral boundaries of the time. It is identified as 'neo-Naturalist'.

=== First World War ===
In 1914, at age 41, he enlisted in the French Army and served on the Western front during World War I. Invalided out of the army three times, Barbusse served in the war for 17 months, until November 1915, when he was permanently moved into a clerical position due to pulmonary damage, exhaustion, and dysentery. On 8 June 1915, he was awarded the Croix de guerre with citation. In 1916, he participated in the Battle of Verdun. He was reformed on 1 June 1917.

Barbusse first came to fame with the publication of his novel Le Feu (translated by William Fitzwater Wray as Under Fire) in 1916, which was based on his experiences during World War I. By this time, Barbusse had become a pacifist, and his writing demonstrated his growing hatred of militarism. Le Feu drew criticism at the time for its harsh naturalism, but won the Prix Goncourt in December 1916.

=== Political and cultural activities ===
In January 1918, he left France and moved to Moscow, where he married a Russian woman and joined the Bolshevik Party. His novel, Clarté, is about an office worker who, while serving in the army, begins to realize that the imperialist war is a crime. Vladimir Lenin commented that this novel was censored in France.

The Russian Revolution had a significant influence on Barbusse's life and work. He joined the French Communist Party in 1923 and later travelled back to the Soviet Union. His later works, Manifeste aux Intellectuels (Elevations) (1930) and others, show a more revolutionary standpoint. Of these, the 1921 Le Couteau entre les dents (The Knife Between My Teeth) marks Barbusse's siding with Bolshevism and the October Revolution. Barbusse characterized the birth of Soviet Russia as "the greatest and most beautiful phenomenon in world history". The book Light (1919) and the collection of articles Words of a Fighting Man (1920) contain calls for the overthrow of capitalism. In 1925, Barbusse published Chains, showing history as the unbroken chain of suffering of people and their struggle for freedom and justice. In the publicistic book The Butchers, he exposes the White Terror in the Balkan countries.

In 1927, Barbusse participated in the Congress of Friends of the Soviet Union in Moscow. He led the World Congress Against Imperialist War (Amsterdam, 1932) and headed the World Committee Against War and Fascism, founded in 1933. He also took part in the work of the International Youth Congress (Paris, 1933) and the International Congress of Writers in Defense of Culture. Additionally, in the 1920s and 1930s, he edited the periodicals Monde (1928–1935) and Progrès Civique, which published some of George Orwell's first writings. He was also literary editor for the daily newspaper l'Humanité from 1926 to 1929.

In 1934, Barbusse sent Egon Kisch to Australia to represent the International Movement Against War and Fascism as part of his work for the Comintern. The resulting unsuccessful exclusion of Egon Kisch from Australia by the conservative Australian government succeeded in energizing Communism in Australia and resulted in Kisch's staying longer than Barbusse had intended.

An associate of Romain Rolland's and editor of Clarté, he attempted to define a "proletarian literature", akin to Proletkult and Socialist realism.

Barbusse was an Esperantist, and was honorary president of the first congress of the Sennacieca Asocio Tutmonda. In 1921, he wrote an article titled "Esperantista Laboristo" ("Esperantist worker") for Esperanto journal.

=== Support for Stalin ===
In his 1928 book Voici ce qu'on a fait de la Géorgie, Barbusse praised post-sovietization political, social, and economic conditions in Georgia and completely glossed over the brutal methods employed by Stalin. This disturbed the dying Lenin, triggering a critical response from the Georgian émigré Dathico Charachidze who published in 1929 Barbusse, les Soviets et la Géorgie, with a sympathetic preface by Karl Kautsky.

In 1930, he published a book Russie, an account of year-long living in the Soviet Union which contained flattering references to Stalin.

In 1932, Barbusse agreed to write a biography of Stalin. Originally, Stalin wanted Maxim Gorky to write it, but he did not, so the task was handed to Barbusse; the key condition was that it would be checked and subject to editorial changes in the Central Committee of the Soviet Communist Party, and Barbusse assured that he would break with the "Trotskyist elements" in the editorial of his journal Monde. It appeared in 1935 as Staline: Un monde nouveau vu à travers un homme (Stalin: A New World Seen Through the Man). Barbusse praised Stalin, whom he called in his personal notes as "great comrade", as a man with "the head of a scholar, with the figure of a worker, and with the dress of a simple soldier" and as the only true heir of Lenin; one of the phrases of the book, "Stalin is the Lenin of today", became one of the most celebrated slogans of the Stalin cult; according to Isaak Mints, the slogan was written by Stalin himself. Although Barbusse had a friendly relationship with Leon Trotsky in the middle of the 1920s, in the book he was condemned as an intriguer and a deviationist, a Menshevik at heart. Nevertheless, Aleksei Stetskii, one of the chief ideologues of the Stalin cult, was concerned by Barbusse's description of Stalin not as "the greatest theoretician of Marxism after Lenin", as he was described in the Soviet Union, but as a "man of action" and practice, while Trotsky still seemed as a "different type of leader": the opposition between Trotsky and Stalin seemed as an opposition between Trotsky's intellectualism and Stalin's anti-intellectualism. The book was published in Russian in the same year.

Victor Serge, a writer and a member of the Left Opposition, met Barbusse in the 1920s and tried to make him aware of the political repression in the USSR:

When I told him about the persecution, he pretended to have a headache, or not to hear, or to be rising to stupendous heights: "Tragic destiny of revolution, immensities, profundities, yes... yes... Ah my friend!" My jaws juddered as I realised that I was face to face with hypocrisy itself.

After this conversation, Barbusse made Serge one of the cosponsors of Monde, but removed him from the masthead after his imprisonment.

Trotsky criticised Barbusse as representative of a "pretentious ... humanitarian, lyric and pacifistical 'communism'".

== Death ==
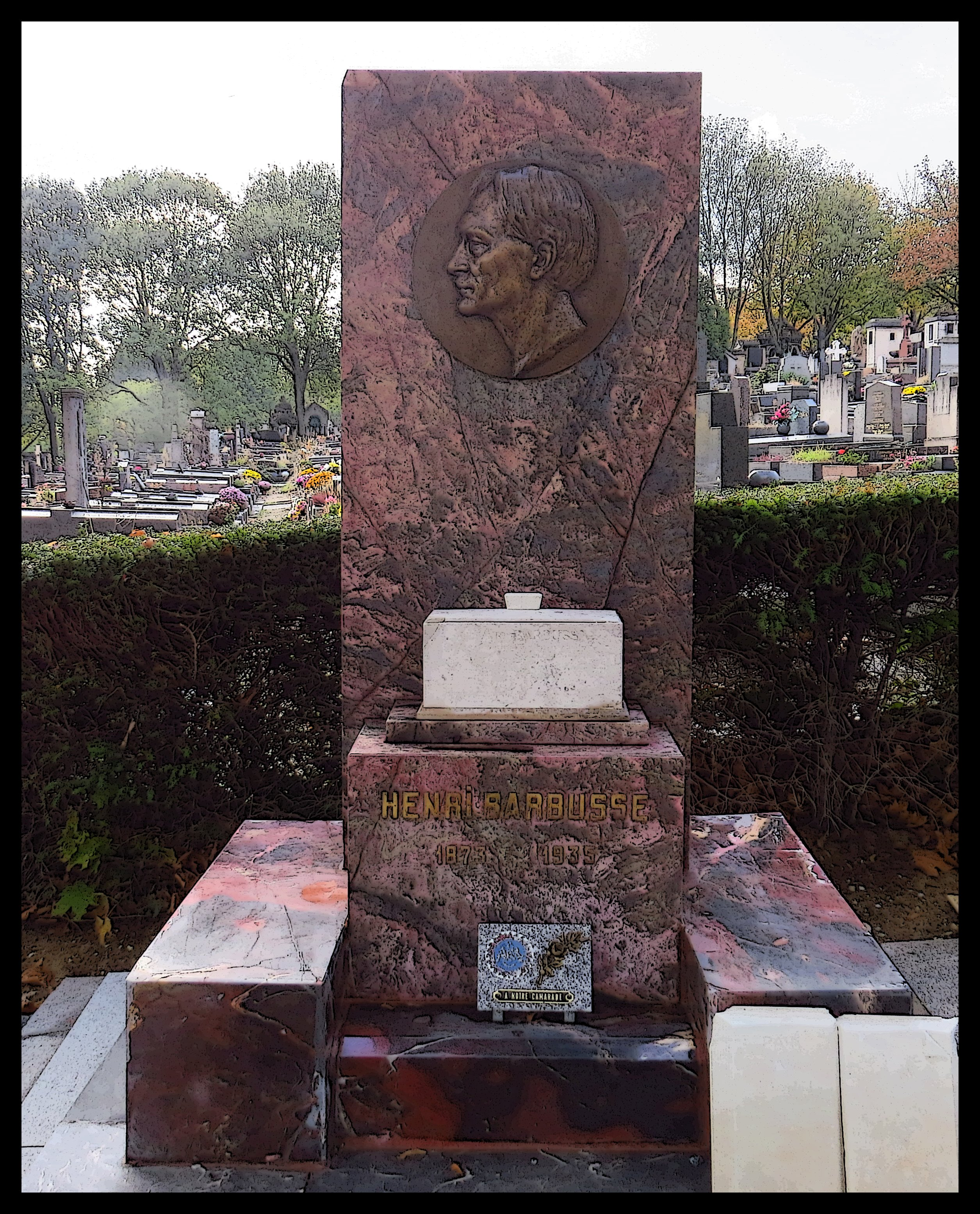
Grave of Henri Barbusse at the Père Lachaise Cemetery

While writing a second biography of Stalin in Moscow, Barbusse fell ill with pneumonia and died on 30 August 1935. His funeral drew 500,000 people and he is buried at the Père Lachaise Cemetery in Paris.

== Legacy ==
In the Spanish Civil War in December 1936 the Henri Barbusse Battalion was formed as part of the XIV International Brigade, named in honour of Henri Barbusse.

In the foreword to I Saw It Happen, a 1942 collection of eyewitness accounts of the war, the book critic Lewis Stiles Gannett wrote: "We shall be hearing and reading of this war for decades to come. No one of us can yet guess who will be its Tolstoys, its Barbusses, its Remarques and its Hemingways."

The parc Henri Barbusse was the site of the Château d'Issy.

== Works ==
- 1895 – Pleureuses; English translation: The Hired Mourners (poetry)
- 1903 – Les Suppliants; English translation: The Supplicants (prose novel)
- 1908 – L'enfer; English translation: Hell (novel)
- 1912 – Meissonier; (biography)
- 1914 - Nous Autres...; English translation: We Others... (short stories)
- 1916 – Le feu; English translation: Under Fire (novel)
- 1919 – Clarte; English translation: Light (novel)
- 1920 - Paroles d'un combattant (non-fiction articles)
- 1921 – Le couteau entre les dents; English translation: The Knife Between My Teeth (essay)
- 1921 – Quelque Coins du Coeur (prose pieces with 24 woodcuts by Frans Masereel)
- 1923 – Esperantista Laboristo; English translation: "Esperantist Worker" (magazine article)
- 1925 - Les enchaînements; English translation: Chains (1930) (novel)
- 1927 – Le Judas de Jésus
- 1928 - Faits divers (novel)
- 1930 - Russie
- 1930 – Manifeste aux intellectuels; English translation: Elevation (novel)
- 1935 – Staline: Un monde nouveau vu à travers un homme (biography); English translation: Stalin: A New World Seen Through the Man, translated by Vyvyan Holland
