= 1938 in art =

Events from the year 1938 in art.

== Events ==
- January 2 – SS Alba sinks off St Ives, Cornwall; the wreck is painted by local ex-fisherman naïve artist Alfred Wallis in several versions, one of which will subsequently be displayed in Tate St Ives, metres from the wreck.
- January 16 – International Exposition of Surrealism opens at the Galerie des Beaux-Arts in Paris.
- January 24 – Peggy Guggenheim opens her Guggenheim Jeune gallery at 30 Cork Street in London with a display of work by Jean Cocteau, followed in February by the first showing of Wassily Kandinsky's work in Britain.
- May 2 – The Royal Academy Exhibition of 1938 opens at Burlington House in London. Wyndham Lewis's Portrait of T. S. Eliot is submitted for exhibition at the Royal Academy of Arts in London but rejected (as expected by the artist), although Eliot himself approves of the painting and Augustus John resigns from the academy in reaction to its rejection.
- July 8 – Exhibition of twentieth century German art opens in London at the New Burlington Galleries, challenging the Nazi view of "degenerate art" in its home country.
- July 10 – Second Große Deutsche Kunstausstellung ("Great German Art Exhibition") opened by Adolf Hitler in the Haus der deutschen Kunst ("House of German Art") in Munich; Hitler attacks the contemporary London exhibition.
- July 13 – Kröller-Müller Museum, designed by Henry van de Velde, opens in Otterlo, Netherlands.
- September – Piet Mondrian moves from Paris to London.
- December 5–17 – Albert Namatjira exhibition in Melbourne includes over 2,000 works, the first solo display of indigenous Australian art.
- American art collector Louis J. Caldor 'discovers' the naïve paintings of Grandma Moses.

== Awards ==
- Archibald Prize: Nora Heysen – Mme Elink Schuurman

== Works ==
- Vilmos Aba-Novák – Fair in Transylvania
- Rita Angus – Head of a Maori Boy
- Thomas Hart Benton – Haystack
- Constantin Brâncuși – The Endless Column (sculpture)
- Javier Bueno – The Fighter of Madrid
- Marc Chagall – White Crucifixion
- William Coldstream – Bolton
- Charles Cundall – Building in Berkeley Square
- Salvador Dalí
  - Apparition of Face and Fruit Dish on a Beach
  - Impressions of Africa
  - Rainy Taxi
- Charles Despiau – Assia (sculpture, Museum of Modern Art, New York)
- Arthur Dove – Swing Music
- M. C. Escher – Sky and Water II (lithograph)
- Leonor Fini
  - Composition with Figures on a Terrace
  - D'Un jour à l'autre (From One Day to Another, diptych)
- Jared French - Lunchtime with Early Miners (mural) in Plymouth, Pennsylvania
- Edward Hopper – Compartment C, Car 293
- Kurt Hutton – Funfair, Southend, Essex (photograph)
- Frida Kahlo
  - Four Inhabitants of Mexico City
  - Self-Portrait with Monkey
  - The Suicide of Dorothy Hale
  - What the Water Gave Me
- Ernst Ludwig Kirchner – Violet House in Front of a Snowy Mountain
- Paul Klee - Oriental Bliss
- L. S. Lowry – Family Group
- René Magritte – Time Transfixed
- Aristide Maillol – Air
- Ronald Moody – Tacet (carved wood head)
- Paul Nash
  - Landscape from a Dream
  - Nocturnal Landscape
- John Petts – Fishwife of Ynys Mon
- Pablo Picasso
  - Femme au beret rouge-orange
  - Maya with Doll
- Walter Sickert – Sir Thomas Beecham Conducting
- Steffen Thomas – Pioneer Women
- Rex Whistler – Capriccio (dining room mural at Plas Newydd in North Wales)
- Ignacio Zuloaga – The Alcázar in Flames (Heroic Landscape of Toledo)

== Births ==
- January 2
  - David Bailey, English photographer
  - Robert Smithson, American artist (d. 1973)
- January 7 – Roland Topor, French illustrator, painter, writer and filmmaker (d. 1997)
- February 13 – Joan Brown, American figurative painter (d. 1990)
- February 22 – Paul Neagu, Romanian-born artist (d. 2004)
- March 6 – Pauline Boty, English pop art painter (d. 1966)
- March 15 – Dick Higgins, English composer, poet, printer and early Fluxus artist (d. 1998)
- April 20 – Andrew Vicari, Welsh-born portrait painter (d. 2016)
- May 12 – Paul Huxley, English painter and academic
- May 18 – Janet Fish, American Realist painter
- May 20 – Astrid Kirchherr, German photographer (d. 2020)
- July 24 – Eugene J. Martin, American visual artist (d. 2005)
- July 28 – Robert Hughes, Australian-born art critic (d. 2012)
- July 30 – Terry O'Neill, British photographer (d. 2019)
- August 19 – Robert Graham, Mexican-American sculptor (d. 2008)
- August 29 – Hermann Nitsch, Austrian performance artist
- September 1 – Per Kirkeby, Danish artist (d. 2018)
- September 25 – Bill Owens, American photographer
- September 27 – Günter Brus, Austrian performance artist
- October 10 – Daidō Moriyama, Japanese photographer
- October 15 – Brice Marden, American painter
- October 20 – Iain Macmillan, Scottish photographer (d. 2006)
- November 2 – Richard Serra, American abstract sculptor (d. 2024)
- November 10 – Claude Serre, French cartoonist (d. 1998)
- December 25 – Duane Armstrong, American painter
- date unknown
  - John Behan, Irish sculptor
  - Rotraut Klein-Moquay, German-French visual artist
  - Takeshi Mizukoshi, Japanese landscape photographer

== Deaths ==
- January 1 – Alice Bailly, Swiss painter and multimedia artist (b. 1872)
- January 19 – Rosa Mayreder, Austrian freethinker, author, painter, musician and feminist (b. 1858)
- February 3 – Niels Skovgaard, Danish sculptor and painter (b. 1858)
- February 28 – C. E. Brock, English painter and illustrator (b. 1870)
- April 7 – Suzanne Valadon, French artists' model and painter, mother of Utrillo (b. 1865)
- April 24 – John Wycliffe Lowes Forster, Canadian historical portrait painter (b. 1850)
- May 22 – William Glackens, American realist painter (b. 1870)
- June 5 – Mikuláš Galanda, Slovak modernist painter and illustrator (b. 1895)
- June 15 – Ernst Ludwig Kirchner, German Expressionist painter (b. 1880; suicide)
- June 19 – María Obligado de Soto y Calvo, Argentinian painter (b. 1857)
- June 24 – C. Yarnall Abbott, American photographer and painter (b. 1870)
- September 6 – Mary Seton Watts, British symbolist craftswoman and designer (b. 1849)
- October 24 – Ernst Barlach, German Expressionist sculptor (b. 1870)
- December 4 – Gonzalo Bilbao, Spanish painter (b. 1860)
- Antonio Fabrés, Catalan painter (b. 1854)

== See also ==
- 1938 in fine arts of the Soviet Union
