= Self-Portrait in a Velvet Dress =

1926 painting by Frida Kahlo

- Artist: Frida Kahlo
- Year: 1926
- Type: Self portrait
- Medium: Oil on canvas
- Dimensions: 78 cm × 61 cm (31 in × 24 in)
- Location: Private collection, Mexico City
- Owner: Alejandro Gómez Arias (until his death in 1990)
- Website: www.fridakahlo.org/self-portrait-in-a-velvet-dress.jsp

Self-Portrait in a Velvet Dress (Spanish: Autorretrato con traje de terciopelo or Spanish: Autorretrato con vestido de terciopelo) is a 1926 oil-on-canvas painting by Mexican artist Frida Kahlo.

== Background ==
At the age of 18, Kahlo suffered serious injuries (from which she never fully recovered and led to lifelong physical pain) when the bus in which she was travelling collided with a trolley car. During her extended period of convalescence, her parents gave her an easel and painting supplies as well as affixing a mirror to the ceiling above her bed so that she could see herself while lying on her back. It was during this recovery period that Kahlo painted Self-portrait in a Velvet Dress.

The picture is considered, if not Kahlo's first self-portrait, then at least her first significant self-portrait. It is her oldest surviving self-portrait and has been described as her "earliest important work" and "her first serious work". It has also been described as "her first real painting."

Early in her career, Kahlo was influenced by the painting of the Italian Renaissance and because of this, in Self-Portrait in a Velvet Dress, "she is portrayed in an aristocratic, somewhat melancholic pose, her neck manneristically elongated in the style of Amedeo Modigliani." The notable influence of European painting and European-influenced Mexican painting seen in this picture contrasts starkly with Kahlo's later work, which more prominently featured indigenous Mexican themes and Mexican national consciousness.

Others have noted that elements of the self-portrait, including the red dress and the slender elegant fingers, are reminiscent of Sandro Botticelli and Bronzino.

== Description ==
Self-Portrait in a Velvet Dress is described as:

"Kahlo appears half length, wearing an elegant velvet dress, against a background of stylized waves. She presents herself as a comely young woman of the time, her hair neatly parted in the centre and combed into a chignon that highlights her oval face and symmetrical features. Her compelling gaze—wide dark eyes under strongly defined brows that almost meet in the middle—expresses challenge and confidence, as if she is daring the viewer to look away."

The dress Kahlo is wearing in the portrait has a wine red color and she has been described as having a regal appearance. The self-portrait is notable for being the first time Kahlo depicted herself with a prominent unibrow, which would go on to become a staple of her work.

This self-portrait is notably less graphic than many of her later paintings.

== Interpretation ==
Scholars and critics have attempted to interpret Kahlo's expression in this early self-portrait, including suggesting, "Frida appears serene, her face a portrait of tranquil beauty. But, there's an unmistakable intensity in her gaze, perhaps a hint of the fiery spirit and passion that was soon to unfold in her subsequent works."

Laura Perez has noted an, "enormous difference between Kahlo's first self-portrait, Autorretrato con traje de terciopelo (Self-Portrait with a Velvet Dress, 1926), and those that followed, such as Autorretrato con collar (Self-Portrait with Necklace, 1933). In the latter, Kahlo no longer represents herself as desirable to a male heterosexual and Euro-identified racializing gaze through idealized femininity and Europeanization. Her masculinizing and indigenous self-representations effectively reject racialized norms of social decency and propriety."

== History ==
The painting was a gift from Kahlo to her boyfriend at the time, Alejandro Gómez Arias. She began working on the painting in late summer of 1926 after her relationship to Alejandro became strained. Self-Portrait in a Velvet Dress was Kahlo's attempt to win back Alejandro's affection and when she finished the painting and sent it to him she included a note that read in part, "Within a few days the portrait will be in your house. Forgive me for sending it without a frame. I implore you to put it in a low place where you can see it as if you were looking at me." The message also referred to the painting for Alejandro as, "your Botticelli". Kahlo's gift of the self-portrait initially had its intended effect and the couple reconnected, though Alejandro eventually moved to Europe and Kahlo stayed in Mexico to work on her painting.

The picture's title has subsequently been used by authors and poets as titles to their works.

== See also ==
- List of paintings by Frida Kahlo
- Self-Portrait with Thorn Necklace and Hummingbird
- Self-Portrait with Monkey
- The Two Fridas
- Self Portrait with Loose Hair
