= Self-Portrait with Loose Hair =

1947 painting by Frida Kahlo

- Artist: Frida Kahlo
- Year: 1947
- Type: Self-portrait
- Medium: Oil on masonite
- Dimensions: 61 cm × 45 cm (24 in × 18 in)
- Location: Private collection, Des Moines
- Website: www.fridakahlo.org/self-portrait-with-loose-hair.jsp

Self-Portrait with Loose Hair (Spanish: Autorretrato con el pelo suelto), also known as Self-Portrait with Unbound Hair, is a 1947 oil-on-masonite painting by Mexican artist Frida Kahlo.

== Description ==
In a 2012 exploration of hair as an indicator of indigenous feminine identity, Self-Portrait with Loose Hair is described as:

"In this autorretrato (self-portrait), Kahlo paints a bust of herself with her dark hair untied and cascading over her shoulder. The thick texture of her hair consumes the right portion of the image. She is wearing traditional Mexican attire. The background appears to be representative of gray stone, and a green leaf is placed near her head. At the bottom of the image, a tattered scroll spans the width of the composition and reveals loosely painted text."

The text on the picture reads, "Here I painted myself, Frida Kahlo, with my reflection in the mirror. I am 37 years old and this is July, 1947. In Coyoacán, Mexico, the place where I was born." (Note: Original Spanish text: "Aquí me pinté yo, Frida Kahlo, con mi reflejo en el espejo. Tengo 37 años y es Julio de 1947. En Coyoacán, México, el sitio en donde nací.") Kahlo was 40 years old at the time.

== Interpretation ==
Academic Sharyn Rohlfsen Udall argued that Kahlo "reveled in nonconformity and disobedience to societal norms" and that, in painting this picture, "she may have been connecting with that formidable prototype."

== History ==
Feminist activist, art collector and philanthropist Louise Noun owned the painting until 1991, when it was sold at auction to a private party, creating a $1.5 million endowment for the Iowa Women's Archives in the process. The total auction price of $1.65 million set a record for Latin American art.

== See also ==
- List of paintings by Frida Kahlo
- Self-Portrait with Thorn Necklace and Hummingbird
- Self-Portrait with Monkey
- The Two Fridas
