= What the Water Gave Me =

What the Water Gave Me may refer to:

- What the Water Gave Me (painting), 1938 painting by Frida Kahlo
- What the Water Gave Me (song), 2011 song by Florence and the Machine
