= Two Nudes in a Forest =

1939 painting by Frida Kahlo

- Dos desnudos en un bosque
- Artist: Frida Kahlo
- Year: 1939
- Type: Oil on metal
- Dimensions: 25 cm × 30.5 cm (9.8 in × 12.0 in)
- Owner: Jon and Mary Shirley

Two Nudes in a Forest is an oil painting by Mexican painter Frida Kahlo that was completed in 1939. It is also referred to as The Earth, Two Nudes in the Wood, or My Nurse and I. The painting was given to a close woman companion of Kahlo's, who some believe to be actress Dolores del Río. The two women in the painting also appear in Kahlo's 1938 painting What the Water Gave Me, and her spider monkey, which views the couple from the forest, also appears in Kahlo's 1937 Fulang-Chang and I.

In May 2016 the painting was sold for $8 million at the Christie's auction in New York.

== Interpretations ==
The two naked women in the painting, one dark-skinned and one light-skinned, are viewed as representations of Kahlo's ethnic identity as connected to her indigenous roots, but also her European ancestry, something that is also explored in The Two Fridas. The painting also brings attention to Kahlo's bisexuality, something she expressed openly in her paintings, as in Self-Portrait with Cropped Hair, and in her sexual affairs.

== See also ==
- List of paintings by Frida Kahlo
