= List of paintings by Frida Kahlo =

The following is a list of notable paintings by the Mexican artist, Frida Kahlo. It does not include drawings, studies, or watercolors.

Year	English Title	Spanish Title	Medium	Location	Image
1924	Tray with Poppies	Charola de amapolas	Oil on wood, 40.5 cm diameter	Collection of Isolda Pinedo Kahlo	
1924	Portrait of Adriana	Retrato de Adriana	Oil on canvas, 105.9 x 73.9 cm	Unknown	
1925	Still Life (Roses)	Naturaleza muerta (Rosas)	Oil on canvas, 41.2 x 30 cm	Private collection	
1925	Urban Landscape	Paisaje urbano	Oil on canvas, 34.29 x 40 cm	Private collection, Mexico City, Mexico	
1926	Self-portrait in a Velvet Dress	Autorretrato con trajede terciopelo	Oil on canvas, 79 x 58 cm	Private collection, Mexico City, Mexico	
1927	If Adelita... or The Peaked Caps	Si Adelita... o Los Cachuchas	Oil on canvas, 65.3 x 45.1 cm	Private collection, Mexico	
1927	La Adelita, Pancho Villa, and Frida	La Adelita, Pancho Villa, y Frida	Oil on canvas mounted on board, 65 x 45 cm	Tlaxcalteca Institute of Culture, Tlaxcala, Mexico	
1927	Portrait of Agustin Olmedo	Retrato de Agustin Olmedo	Oil on canvas, 79 x 59 cm	Coyoacán, Mexico	
1927	Portrait of Alicia Galant	Retrato de Alicia Galant	Oil on canvas, 107 x 93 cm	Museo Dolores Olmedo, Mexico City, Mexico	
c. 1927	Portrait of Jesús Ríos y Valles	Retrato de Jesús Ríos y Valle	Oil on canvas, dimensions unknown	Destroyed	
1927	Portrait of Miquel N. Lira	Retrato de Miquel N. Lira	Oil on canvas, 106 x 74 cm	Tlaxcalteca Institute of Culture, Tlaxcala, Mexico	
1927	Portrait of Ruth Quintanilla	Retrato de Ruth Quintanilla	Oil on canvas, dimensions unknown	Unknown	
1928	Hucha y caballo negro	Hucha and black horse	dimensions unknown	Unknown	
1928	Portrait of Alejandro Gómez Arias	Retrato de Alejandro Gómez Arias	Oil on wood, 61.5 x 41 cm	Private collection, Mexico	
1928	Portrait of Cristina, My Sister	Retrato de Cristina, Mi Hermana	Oil on wood, 99 x 81.5 cm	Private collection, Mexico City, Mexico	
1928	Sitting Girl with Duck	Niña Sentada con Pato	Oil on canvas, 100.3 x 40.3 cm	Private collection	
1928	Two Women (Salvadora and Herminia)	Dos mujeres (Salvadora y Herminia)	Oil on canvas, 69.5 x 53.3 cm	Museum of Fine Arts, Boston, Massachusetts	
1929	Girl with Necklace	Niña con collar	Oil on canvas, 57 x 46 cm	Private collection	
1929	Indian Woman Nude	Desnudo de mujer India	Oil on canvas, dimensions unknown	Unknown	
1929	Portrait of a Girl	Retrato de una niña	Oil on canvas, 118.1 x 80 cm	Frida Kahlo Museum, Coyoacán, Mexico	
1929	Portrait of a Girl with Ribbon Around her Waist	Retrato de una niña con un lazo en la cintura	Oil on canvas, dimensions unknown	Unknown	
1929	Portrait of Isolda Pinedo Kahlo	Retrato de Isolda Pinedo Kahlo	Oil on canvas, 65.5 x 44 cm	Collection of Grupo Sura, Mexico City, Mexico	
1929	Portrait of Lupe Marín	Retrato de Lupe Marín	Oil on canvas, dimensions unknown	Destroyed	
1929	Portrait of Miriam Penansky	Retrato de Miriam Penansky	Oil on canvas, 60 x 47 cm	Private collection, Gainesville, Florida	
1929	Portrait of Virginia (Little Girl)	Retrato de Virginia (Niña)	Oil on masonite, 84 x 68 cm	Museo Dolores Olmedo, Mexico City, Mexico	
1929	Self-Portrait – Time Flies	Autorretrato – El tiempo vuela	Oil on masonite, 77.5 x 61 cm	Collection of Antony Bryan	
1929	The Bus	El camion	Oil on canvas, 26 x 55.5 cm	Museo Dolores Olmedo, Mexico City, Mexico	
1930	Portrait of a Woman in White	Retrato de una mujer de blanco	Oil on canvas, 119 x 81 cm	Private collection, Berlin, Germany	
1930	Self-Portrait	Autorretrato	Oil on canvas, 65 x 54 cm	Private collection, Boston, Massachusetts, United States	
1931	Display Window in a Street in Detroit	Aparado en una calle de Detroit	Oil on metal, 30.3 x 38.2 cm	Collection of Mr. and Mrs. Abel Holtz, United States	
1931	Frieda and Diego Rivera	Frieda y Diego Rivera	Oil on canvas, 100 x 79 cm	San Francisco Museum of Modern Art, San Francisco, United States	
1931	Portrait of Dr. Leo Eloesser	Retrato de Dr. Leo Eloesser	Oil on masonite, 85.1 x 59.7 cm	University of California, School of Medicine, San Francisco, United States	
1931	Portrait of Eva Frederick	Retrato de Eva Frederick	Oil on canvas, 87 x 44 cm	Museo Dolores Olmedo, Mexico City, Mexico	
1931	Portrait of Mrs. Jean Wight	Retrato de Sra. Jean Wight	Oil on canvas, 63.5 x 46 cm	Collection of Mr. and Mrs. John Berggruen, San Francisco, United States	
1932	Frida and the Cesarean Operation	Frida y la operación cesárea	Oil on canvas, 73 x 62 cm	Frida Kahlo Museum, Coyoacán, Mexico	
1932	Henry Ford Hospital	Henry Ford Hospital	Oil on metal, 30.5 x 38 cm	Museo Dolores Olmedo, Mexico City, Mexico	
1932	My Birth	Mi nacimiento	Oil on metal, 30.5 x 35 cm	Private collection of Madonna	
1932	Portrait of Luther Burbank	Retrato de Luther Burbank	Oil on masonite, 87 x 62 cm	Museo Dolores Olmedo, Mexico City, Mexico	
1932	Self-Portrait on the Border of Mexico and The United States	Autorretrato en la frontera entre México y los Estados Unidos	Oil on metal, 31 x 35 cm	Collection of Maria Rodriquez de Reyero, New York City, United States	
1933	My Dress Hangs There	Allá cuelga mi vestido	Oil and collage on masonite, 45.7 x 49.5 cm	Hoover Gallery, San Francisco, United States	
1933	Self-Portrait	Autorretrato	Fresco mounted on metal, 62.8 x 48.2 cm	Private Collection, Monterrey	
1933	Self-Portrait – Very Ugly	Autorretrato – muy fea	Fresco mounted on masonite, 27.4 x 22.2 cm	Private collection, Dallas, Texas, United States	
1933	Self-Portrait with Necklace	Autorretrato con collar	Oil on metal, 34.5 x 29.5 cm	Collection of Jacques & Natasha Gelman, Mexico City, Mexico	
1935	A Few Small Nips	Unos cuantos piquetitos	Oil on metal with wooden frame, 38 x 48.5 cm	Museo Dolores Olmedo, Mexico City, Mexico	
1935	Self-Portrait with Curly Hair	Autorretrato con pelo rizado	Oil on tin, 19.3 x 14.7 cm	Private collection, California, United States	
1936	My Grandparents, My Parents, and I	Mis abuelos, mis padres, y yo	Oil and tempera on zinc, 30.7 x 34.5 cm	Museum of Modern Art, New York City, United States	
1937	Cactus Fruits	Tunas	Oil on metal, 20 x 24 cm	Robert Holmes Collection, Perth, Australia	
1937	Fulang-Chang and I	Fulang-Chang y yo	Oil on masonite, 40 x 28 cm	Museum of Modern Art, New York City, United States	
1937	I Belong to My Owner	Pertenezco a mi dueño	Oil on canvas, dimensions unknown	Unknown	
1937	Me and My Doll	Yo y mi muñeca	Oil on sheet metal, 40 x 31 cm	Collection of Jacques & Natasha Gelman, Mexico City, Mexico	
1937	Memory, the Heart	Recuerdo	Oil on metal, 40 x 28 cm	Collection of Michel Petitjean, Paris, France	
1937	My Nurse and I	Mi nana y yo	Oil on metal, 30.5 x 36.83 cm	Museo Dolores Olmedo, Mexico City, Mexico	
1937	Portrait of Alberto Misrachi	Retrato de Alberto Misrachi	Oil on metal, 34.3 x 26.9 cm	Collection of Ana Misrachi, Mexico City, Mexico	
1937	Portrait of Diego Rivera	Retrato de Diego Rivera	Oil on wood, 46 x 32 cm	Collection of Jacques & Natasha Gelman, Mexico City, Mexico	
1937	Self-Portrait Dedicated to Leon Trotsky	Autorretrato dedicado a Leon Trotsky	Oil on masonite, 87 x 70 cm	National Museum of Women in the Arts, Washington, DC, United States	
1937	The Deceased Dimas	El difuntito Dimas	Oil on masonite, 48 x 31 cm	Museo Dolores Olmedo, Mexico City, Mexico	
1938	Four Inhabitants of Mexico City (The Square is Theirs)	Cuatro habitantes de la Ciudad de México	Oil on canvas, 31.4 x 47.6 cm	Private collection, Palo Alto, California, United States	
1938	Fruits of the Earth	Frutos de la tierra	Oil on masonite, 40.6 x 60 cm	Collection of National Bank of Mexico, Mexico City, Mexico	
1938	Girl with Death Mask (She Plays Alone)	Niña con mascara de muerte (Ella juega solo)	Oil on metal, 14.9 x 11 cm	Nagoya City Art Museum, Nagoya, Japan	
1938	Girl with Death Mask II	Niña con mascara de muerte II	Unknown	Unknown	
1938	Itzcuintli Dog with Me	Perro Itzcuintli conmigo	Oil on canvas, 71 x 52 cm	Private collection, Dallas, Texas, United States	
1938	Pitahayas	Pitahayas	Oil on metal, 25.4 x 35.6 cm	Madison Museum of Contemporary Art, Madison, Wisconsin, United States	
1938	Remembrance of the Open Wound	Recuerdo de la herida abierta	Oil, 20.3 x 25.4 cm	Destroyed in a fire	
1938	Self-Portrait	Autorretrato	Oil on plate, 12 x 7 cm	Private collection, Paris, France	
1938	Self-Portrait (Oval Miniature)	Autorretrato (oval miniatura)	Oil on wood, 4.1 x 3.8 cm	Private collection, New York, United States	
1938	Self-Portrait with Monkey	Autorretrato con mono	Oil on masonite, 40.6 x 30.5 cm	Albright–Knox Art Gallery, Buffalo, New York	
1938	Survivor	Superviviente	Oil on metal, 17 x 12 cm	Private collection	
1938	The Frame (Self-Portrait)	El marco (autorretrato)	Oil on aluminium and glass, 28.5 x 20.7 cm	Musée National d'Art Moderne, Paris, France	
1938	The Airplane Crash	El accidente de aviación	Oil on canvas, dimensions unknown	Unknown	
1938	The Suicide of Dorothy Hale	El suicidio de Dorothy Hale	Oil on masonite, 60.4 x 48.6 cm	Phoenix Art Museum, Phoenix, Arizona, United States	
1938	They Asked for Airplanes But Were Given Straw Wings	Piden aeroplanos y les dan alas de petate	Oil on metal, 12.0 x 16.5 cm	Unknown	
1938	What the Water Gave Me	Lo que el agua me dio	Oil on canvas, 91.44 x 70.5 cm	Collection of Daniel Filipacchi, Paris, France	
1938	When I Have You, Life, How Much I Love You†	Cuando te tengo a ti, vida, cuanto te quiero	Oil on board, 55.6 x 35.6 cm	Private collection	
1938	Xochil, Flower of Life	Xochitl, flor de la vida	Oil on metal, 18 x 9.5 cm	Collection of Dr. Rodolfo Gomez, Mexico City, Mexico	
1939	The Two Fridas	Las dos Fridas	Oil on canvas, 173.5 x 173 cm	Museo de Arte Moderno, Mexico City, Mexico	
1939	Two Nudes in a Forest	Dos desnudos en un bosque	Oil on metal, 25 x 30.5 cm	Collection of Jon and Mary Shirley, Washington, United States	
1940	Retablo	Retablo	Oil on metal, 19.1 x 24.1 cm	Private collection	
1940	Self-Portrait Dedicated to Dr. Eloesser	Autorretrato dedicado al Dr. Eloesser	Oil on masonite, 59.5 x 40 cm	Lucas Museum of Narrative Art	
1940	Self-Portrait Dedicated to Sigmund Firestone	Autorretrato dedicado al Sigmund Firestone	Oil on masonite, 61 x 43 cm	Collection of Violet Gershenson, New York, United States	
1940	Self-Portrait with Cropped Hair	Autorretrato con pelo corto	Oil on canvas, 40 x 28 cm	Museum of Modern Art, New York City, United States	
1940	Self-Portrait with Monkey	Autorretrato con mono	Oil on masonite, 55.2 x 43.5 cm	Private collection of Madonna	
1940	Self-Portrait with Thorn Necklace and Hummingbird	Autorretrato con collar de espinas	Oil on canvas, 63.5 x 49.5 cm	University of Texas at Austin, Austin, Texas, United States	
1940	The Dream (The Bed)	El sueño (La cama)	Oil on canvas, 74 x 98.5 cm	Unknown	
1940	The Wounded Table	La mesa herida	Oil on wood, 122 x 244 cm	Unknown (possibly Poland or Moscow, Russia)	
1941	Flower Basket	Cesta con flores	Oil on copper plate, 64.1 cm	Private collection, Seattle, United States	
1941	Me and My Parrots	Yo y mis pericos	Oil on canvas, 82 x 62.8 cm	Collection of Mr. & Mrs. Harold H. Stream, New Orleans, Louisiana, United States	
1941	Portrait of Arija Muray	Retrato de Arija Muray	Oil on masonite, 75 x 60 cm	Frida Kahlo Museum, Coyoacán, Mexico	
1941	Self-Portrait in Red and Gold Dress (MCMXLI)	Autorretrato con vestido rojo y dorado (MCMXLI)	Oil on canvas, 37.8 x 26.9 cm	Collection of Jacques & Natasha Gelman, Mexico City, Mexico	
1941	Self-Portrait with Bonito	Autorretrato con bonito	Oil on canvas, 55 x 43.4 cm	Private collection, United States	
1941	Self-Portrait with Braid	Autorretrato con trenza	Oil on masonite, 51 x 38.7 cm	Collection of Jacques & Natasha Gelman, Mexico City, Mexico	
1942	Portrait of Lucha Maria, a Girl from Tehuacan	Retrato de Lucha Maria, una niña de Tehuacan	Oil on masonite, 54.6 x 43.2 cm	Collection of José Antonio Pérez Simón, Mexico City, Mexico	
1942	Portrait of Marucha Lavin	Retrato de Marucha Lavin	Oil on copper, 64.8 cm	Collection of Jose Domingo and Eugenia Lavin, Mexico City, Mexico	
1942	Self-Portrait with Monkey and Parrot	Autorretrato con mono y perico	Oil on masonite, 54.6 x 43.2 cm	MALBA, Buenos Aires, Argentina	
1942	Still Life (Round)	Naturaleza muerta (Tondo)	Oil on copper plate, 63 cm	Frida Kahlo Museum, Coyoacán, Mexico	
1943	Diego in My Thoughts (Thinking of Diego) (Self-Portrait as a Tehuana)	Diego en mi pensamiento (Pensando en Diego) (Autorretrato como Tehuana)	Oil on masonite, 76 x 61 cm	Collection of Jacques & Natasha Gelman, Mexico City, Mexico	
1943	Flower of Life	Flor de la vida	Oil on masonite, 27.8 x 19.7 cm	Museo Dolores Olmedo, Mexico City, Mexico	
1943	How Beautiful Life is When It Gives Us Its Riches†	Que bonita es la vida cuando nos da sus riquezas	Unknown	Unknown	
1943	Portrait of Natasha Gelman	Retrato de Natasha Gelman	Oil on canvas, 30 x 23 cm	Collection of Jacques & Natasha Gelman, Mexico City, Mexico	
1943	Roots (El Pedregal)	Raíces (El Pedregal)	Oil on metal, 30.5 x 49.9 cm	Private collection	
1943	Self-Portrait with Monkeys	Autorretrato con monos	Oil on canvas, 81.5 x 63 cm	Collection of Jacques & Natasha Gelman, Mexico City, Mexico	
1943	The Bride Frightened at Seeing Life Opened	La novia asustada al ver la vida abierta	Oil on canvas, 63 x 81.5 cm	Collection of Jacques & Natasha Gelman, Mexico City, Mexico	
1943	Thinking About Death	Pensando en la muerte	Oil on canvas mounted on masonite, 44.5 x 37 cm	Collection of Dolores Olmedo Patiño, Mexico City, Mexico	
1944	Diego and Frida 1929–1944	Diego y Frida 1929–1944	Oil on masonite, 12.3 x 7.4 cm; with frame 26 x 18.5 cm	Private collection, Mexico City, Mexico	
1944	Frida and Diego (Diego and Frida 1929–1944 II)	Frida y Diego (Diego y Frida 1929–1944 II)	Oil on masonite, 13.5 x 8.5 cm	Private collection, Mexico City, Mexico	
1944	Portrait of Alicia and Eduardo Safa	Retrato de Alicia y Eduardo Safa	Oil on canvas, 56 x 85.5 cm	Collection of Dolores Olmedo Patiño, Mexico City, Mexico	
1944	Portrait of Doña Rosita Morillo	Retrato de Doña Rosita Morillo	Oil on canvas mounted on masonite, 75.5 x 59.5 cm	Collection of Dolores Olmedo Patiño, Mexico City, Mexico	
1944	Portrait of Lupita Morillo Safa	Retrato de Lupita Morillo Safa	Oil on masonite, 58.7 x 53.3 cm	Private collection	
1944	Portrait of Mariana Morillo Safa	Retrato de Mariana Morillo Safa	Oil on canvas, 40 x 28 cm	Private collection, New York, United States	
1944	Portrait of Marte R. Gómez	Retrato de Marte R. Gómez	Oil on masonite, 32.4 x 26	Universidad Autónoma Chapingo, Texcoco, Mexico	
1944	Portrait of Marte R. Gómez	Retrato de Marte R. Gómez	Oil on masonite, 32.5 x 26.5 cm	Collection of Marte Gomez Leal, Mexico City, Mexico	
1944	Portrait of the Engineer Eduardo Morillo Safa	Retrato del Ingeniero Eduardo Morillo Safa	Oil on masonite, 41.9 x 31.2 cm	Collection of Dolores Olmedo Patiño, Mexico City, Mexico	
1944	The Broken Column	La columna rota	Oil on canvas, 43 x 33 cm	Museo Dolores Olmedo, Mexico City, Mexico	
1945	Magnolias	Magnolias	Oil on masonite, 41 x 57 cm	Collection of Balbina Azcarraga, Mexico City, Mexico	
1945	Moses	Moises	Oil on masonite, 61 x 75.6 cm	Private collection	
1945	Self-Portrait with Monkey	Autorretrato con mono	Oil on masonite, 57 x 42 cm	Collection of Robert Brady Foundation, Cuernavaca, Mexico	
1945	Self-Portrait with Small Monkey	Autorretrato con changuito	Oil on masonite, 39.5 x 34.5 cm	Museo Dolores Olmedo, Mexico City, Mexico	
1945	The Chick	El pollito	Oil on masonite, 27.2 x 22.2 cm	Museo Dolores Olmedo, Mexico City, Mexico	
1945	The Mask	La mascara (de la locura)	Oil on masonite, 40 x 30.5 cm	Museo Dolores Olmedo, Mexico City, Mexico	
1945	Without Hope	Sin esperanza	Oil on canvas mounted on masonite, 28 x 36 cm	Collection of Dolores Olmedo Patiño, Mexico City, Mexico	
1946	Landscape (Landscape of El Pedregal)	Paisaje	Oil on canvas, 20 x 27 cm	Frida Kahlo Museum, Coyoacán, Mexico	
1946	The Wounded Deer	El venado herido	Oil on masonite, 22.4 x 30 cm	Collection unknown; formerly Collection of Carolyn Farb, Houston, Texas, United States	
1946	Tree of Hope, Remain Strong	Arbol de la esperanza, mantente firme	Oil on masonite, 55.9 x 40.6 cm	Collection of Daniel Filipacchi, Paris, France	
1947	Self Portrait with Loose Hair	Autorretrato con el pelo suelto	Oil on masonite, 61 x 45 cm	Private collection, Des Moines, Iowa, United States	
1947	Sun and Life	El sol y la vida	Oil on masonite, 40 x 50 cm	Collection of Manuel Perusquia, Galería Arvil, Mexico City, Mexico	
1948	Self-Portrait	Autorretrato	Oil on masonite, 50 x 39.5 cm	Collection of Dr. Samuel Fastlicht, Mexico City, Mexico	
1949	Diego and I	Diego y yo	Oil on canvas mounted on masonite, 29.5 x 22.4 cm	MALBA, Buenos Aires, Argentina	
1949	The Love Embrace of the Universe, the Earth (Mexico), Myself, Diego, and Señor Xolotl	El abrazo de amor de el universo, la tierra (México), yo, Diego, y el Señor Xolotl	Oil on canvas, 70 x 60.5 cm	Collection of Jacques & Natasha Gelman, Mexico City, Mexico	
1950	Portrait of Frida's Family	Retrato de la familia de Frida	Oil on masonite, 41 x 59 cm	Frida Kahlo Museum, Coyoacán, Mexico	
1951	Coconuts	Cocos	Oil on masonite, 25.4 x 34.6 cm	Museo de Arte Moderno, Mexico City, Mexico	
1951	Portrait of Marta Patricia Procel	Retrato de Marta Patricia Procel	Oil pencil on masonite, 70 x 61cm	Frida Kahlo Museum, Coyoacán, Mexico	
1951	Portrait of My Father	Retrato de mi padre	Oil on masonite, 60.5 x 46.5 cm	Frida Kahlo Museum, Coyoacán, Mexico	
1951	Self-Portrait with the Portrait of Doctor Farill	Autorretrato con el retrato del Dr. Farill	Oil on masonite, 41.5 x 50 cm	Galería Arvil, Mexico City, Mexico	
1951	Still Life Dedicated to Samuel Fastlicht	Naturaleza muerta dedicado al Samuel Fastlicht	Oil on canvas, 28.2 x 36 cm	Collection of Dr. Samuel Fastlicht, Mexico City, Mexico	
1951	Still Life with Parrot and Flag	Naturaleza muerta con loro y bandera	Oil on masonite, 28 x 40 cm	Collection of Diaz Ordaz, Mexico City, Mexico	
1951	Still Life with Parrot and Fruit	Naturaleza muerta con loro y fruta	Oil on canvas, 25.4 x 29.7 cm	University of Texas at Austin, Austin, Texas, United States	
1951	The Circle	El circulo	Oil on metal, 15 cm	Collection of Dolores Olmedo Patiño, Mexico City, Mexico	
1951	Weeping Coconuts	Cocos llorando	Oil on masonite, 35.6 x 42.6 cm	Los Angeles County Museum of Art, Los Angeles, United States	
1952	Congress of People for Peace	Congreso de los pueblos por la paz	Oil and tempera on masonite, 19.1 x 25.1 cm	Unknown	
1952	Living Nature	Naturaleza viva	Oil on canvas, 44 x 59.7 cm	Collection of María Félix, Mexico City, Mexico	
1952	Self-Portrait (Unfinished)	Autorretrato (unfinished)	Oil and charcoal on canvas, 55 x 65 cm	Frida Kahlo Museum, Coyoacán, Mexico	
1952	Still Life Dedicated to Samuel Fastlicht	Naturaleza muerta dedicado al Samuel Fastlicht	Oil on canvas mounted on wood, 25.8 x 44 cm	Collection of Dr. Samuel Fastlicht, Mexico City, Mexico	
1953	Fruit of Life	Fruta de la vida	Oil on masonite, 47 x 62 cm	Collection of Raquel M. de Espinosa Ulloa, Mexico City, Mexico	
1953	Still Life with Watermelons	Naturaleza muerta con sandias	Oil on compressed wood, 40 x 60 cm	Museo de Arte Moderno, Mexico City, Mexico	
1954	Brick Kilns	Los hornos de ladrillo	Oil on masonite, 39 x 59.5 cm	Frida Kahlo Museum, Coyoacán, Mexico	
1954	Frida in Flames (Self-Portrait Inside of a Sunflower)		Oil on canvas, mounted on wood, 23.8 x 32.4 cm	Private collection, United States	
1954	Marxism Will Give Health to the Sick	El Marxismo dará salud a los enfermos	Oil on masonite, 76 x 61 cm	Frida Kahlo Museum, Coyoacán, Mexico	
1954	Portrait of Stalin (Unfinished)	Retrato de Stalin (unfinished)	Oil and pencil on masonite, 61.7 x 46.7 cm	Frida Kahlo Museum, Coyoacán, Mexico	
1954	Self-Portrait in a Landscape with the Sun Going Down	Autorretrato en un paisaje con el sol poniéndose	Unknown	Destroyed by Kahlo	
1954	Self-Portrait with a Portrait of Diego on the Breast and Maria Between the Eyebrows	Autorretrato con el retrato de Diego en el pecho y María entre las cejas	Oil on masonite, 61 x 41 cm	Private Collection, California, United States	
1954	Self-Portrait with Stalin	Autorretrato con Stalin	Oil on masonite, 59 x 39 cm	Frida Kahlo Museum, Coyoacán, Mexico	
1954	Still Life with Flag	Naturaleza muerta con bandera	Oil on masonite, 38 x 52 cm	Frida Kahlo Museum, Coyoacán, Mexico	
1954	Viva la Vida and the Dr. Juan Farill	Viva la vida y el Dr. Juan Farill	Oil on masonite, 39 x 65 cm	Private collection, Mexico City, Mexico	
1954	Viva la Vida (Long Live Life)	Viva la vida	Oil on masonite, 52 x 72 cm	Frida Kahlo Museum, Coyoacán, Mexico	

† The authenticity of When I Have You, Life, How Much I Love You and How Beautiful Life is When It Gives Us Its Riches is disputed.
