= Mizukoshi =

Mizukoshi (written 水越) is a Japanese surname. Notable people with the surname include:

- Jun Mizukoshi (水越 潤, born 1975), Japanese footballer and manager
- Takeshi Mizukoshi (水越 武, born 1938), Japanese photographer
