= Pioneer Women =

1938 memorial in Atlanta, Georgia, US

Coordinates: 33°47′13.1″N 84°22′39.1″W

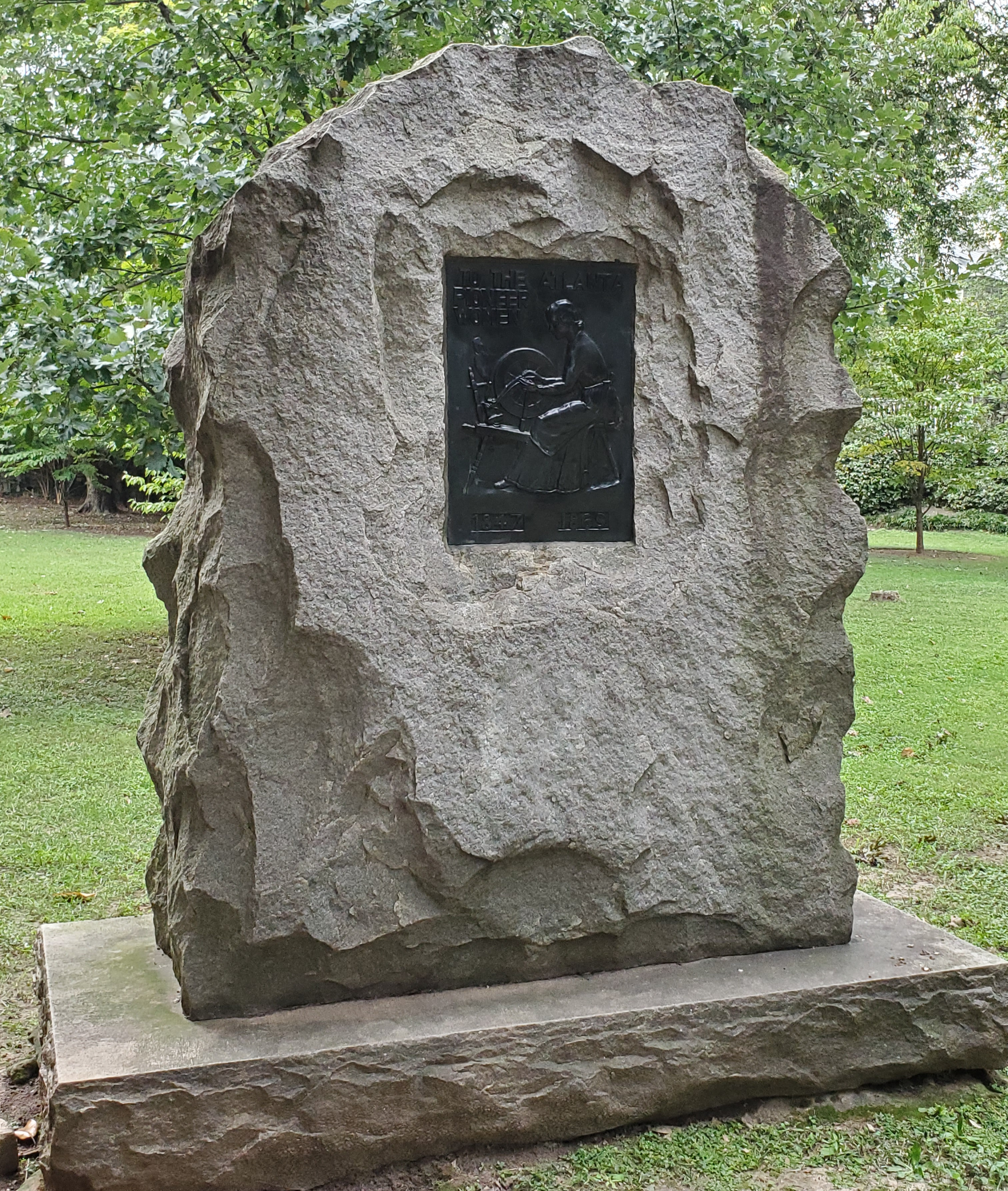
- Pioneer Women (2020)
- Location: Piedmont Park, Atlanta, Georgia, United States
- Designer: Steffen Thomas
- Material: Granite; Bronze
- Dedicated date: 1938
- Dedicated to: Former members of the Atlanta Pioneer Women's Society

Pioneer Women is a memorial in Atlanta, Georgia, United States. Located in Piedmont Park, the memorial, designed by Steffen Thomas, was dedicated in 1938 by the Atlanta Pioneer Women's Society to honor former members of the group.

== History ==
The memorial was erected in 1938 to honor group members between 1847 and 1869. Steffen Thomas designed the monument. The memorial consists of a large granite boulder affixed with bronze plaques. The plaque on one side shows a woman working at a spinning wheel. The memorial is located just north of the park's 14th Street entrance.

== See also ==
- 1938 in art
