= The Love Embrace of the Universe, the Earth (Mexico), Myself, Diego, and Señor Xolotl =

1949 painting by Frida Kahlo

- El abrazo de amor entre el Universo, la Tierra, yo, Diego y el señor Xólotl (Spanish)
- Artist: Frida Kahlo
- Year: 1949
- Type: Oil on Masonite
- Dimensions: 70 cm × 60.5 cm (28 in × 23.8 in)
- Location: Mexico City
- Owner: Jacques & Natasha Gelman

The Love Embrace of the Universe, the Earth (Mexico), Myself, Diego, and Señor Xolotl is a 1949 painting by Frida Kahlo. Created in Mexico, the 70 cm x 60.5 cm painting was painted with oil on Masonite. It was featured on the reverse of the Series F $500 peso banknote, issued in 2010.

== Themes and symbolism ==
The Love Embrace holds many layers of entwining embraces. The twofold face of the Universe, the light and dark background of planets and ethereal fog, is holding a murkier Earth (Mexico), whose breasts are lactating. The Earth (Mexico), with all her vegetation, is subsequently holding Frida Kahlo. Continuing further, Frida is then holding a nude Diego Rivera, whose forehead contains a third eye. The symbols mirror many of Kahlo's other works, including womanhood, motherhood and her relationship with Diego Rivera.

=== Womanhood ===
Art historian Chelsey Miller says about the details of The Love Embrace, "In paintings such as The Love Embrace of the Universe, the Earth (Mexico), Diego, I and Señor Xolotl it is clear that Frida felt a deep connection to the Earth and to the feminine energies [of the Earth]". This statement is reflected in Kahlo's 1943 painting Roots, which depicts Kahlo with vegetation entwined throughout her body, and the above Earth (Mexico) in The Love Embrace, which depicts vegetation all over her body. Kahlo repeated uses the iconography of a woman's body to portray the earth as the source of life.

=== Motherhood ===
The myth of Kahlo's infertility has been refuted by Ankari's critical biography that makes extensive use of original sources. Indeed, rather than being infertile, Kahlo underwent multiple abortions. Her reasons included concern for passing on her father's epilepsy, her own ill health, and importantly, her husband Diego Rivera's desire to not have children, as evidenced by the abandonment of several women who had his children. Indeed, in a discussion with two of the mothers of Diego's children, they and Kahlo decided that he himself is like a child, a conclusion evidenced in this work. Kahlo was still interested in fertility, and the stereotypical roles of women being fertile and nurturing act are depicted in the Earth (Mexico)'s lactating breasts and the multiple levels of embrace.

=== Diego Rivera ===
While Diego is being held like a baby in Frida's embrace, he is also depicted with a third eye on his forehead. This is similar to a depiction of Diego in Frida's Diego and I, also painted in 1949. A third eye often indicates a deity or person who is the epitome of wisdom and intelligence. Kahlo, who thought of Rivera as one of the most brilliant people in the world, revered his thinking and his works of art to a standard that was god-like, often referring to Diego as "The Master."

== See also ==
- List of paintings by Frida Kahlo
