= Louise Noun =

American activist (1908–2002)

Louise Frankel Rosenfield Noun
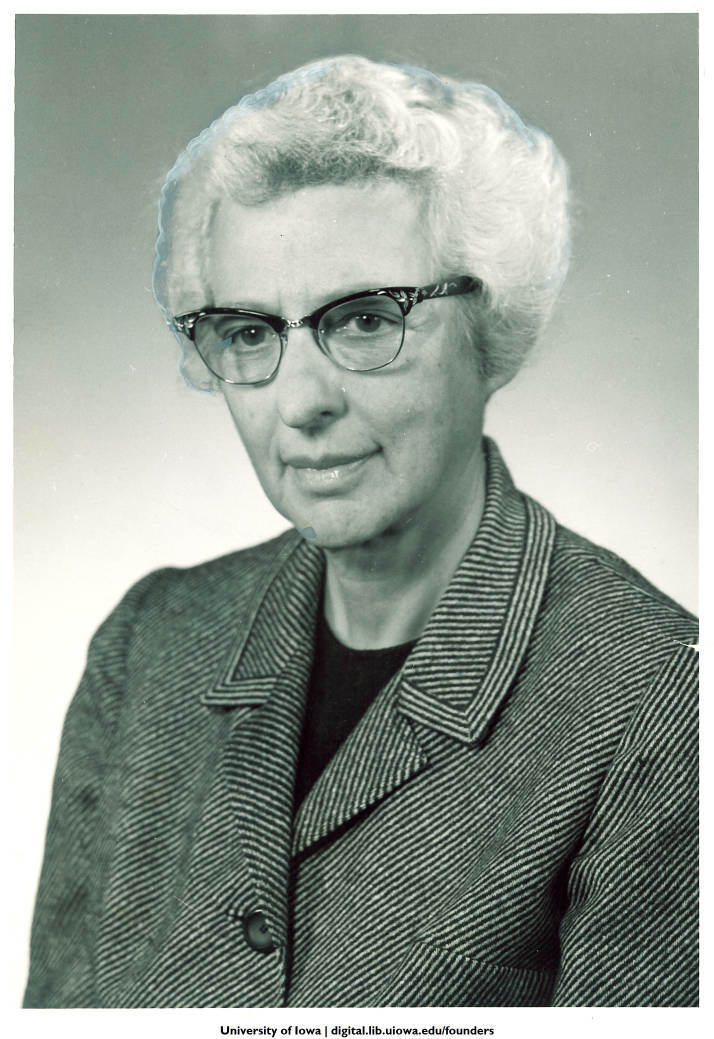
- Born: Louise Frankel Rosenfield; March 7, 1908; Des Moines, Iowa
- Died: August 23, 2002 (aged 94); Des Moines, Iowa
- Education: Grinnell College, Radcliffe College
- Known for: Art collector, Iowa Civil Liberties Union

Louise Frankel Rosenfield Noun (March 7, 1908 – August 23, 2002) was a feminist, social activist, philanthropist, and civil libertarian.

An Iowa native, Noun wrote extensively on the history of feminism in Iowa and the United States, writing four books on the subject and an autobiography. As president of the Iowa Civil Liberties Union from 1964 to 1972, she was actively involved and helped fund the Tinker v. Des Moines Independent Community School District case. In 1992, she accomplished a long-term goal and co-founded the Iowa Women's Archives at the University of Iowa with activist Mary Louise Smith. In failing health, Noun died by suicide on August 23, 2002.

== Early life and education ==
Louise Frankel Rosenfield was born on March 7, 1908, in Des Moines, Iowa. Her father, Meyer Rosenfield, was a successful owner of a Younkers department store. Her mother, Rose Frankel Rosenfield, was a community activist who was very involved in the women's suffrage movement in Iowa and was close friends with Flora Dunlap, the president of the Iowa Women's Suffrage Association and the first president of the Iowa League of Women Voters. In a 1985 interview with Howard Simmons, Noun asserted that her father was more reticent and that her mother "ran the show with a firm hand." Both parents were children of German-Jewish immigrants. Louise Rosenfield had two siblings, Ruth and Joseph.

Louise Noun attended West High School in Des Moines, attending half-day sessions due to overcrowded conditions. She finished high school at the newly established Roosevelt High School in Des Moines and graduated in 1925. Noun pursued a bachelor's degree at Grinnell College, transferring to Wellesley College for her junior year, but returning to Grinnell upon hearing of her father's declining health. She graduated from Grinnell in 1929, later earning her M.A. in art history and museum management from Radcliffe College, graduating in 1933. Noun briefly attended Drake University Law School in 1967 for one semester.

== Personal life ==
=== Marriage and child ===
In 1936, Louise married Maurice "Maurie" Noun, a successful Des Moines dermatologist. After Maurice Noun returned from serving in World War II, the couple adopted a daughter, Susan, in 1946. During these years, Noun worked as a volunteer in community affairs. The couple divorced in 1967. Soon after, Maurice suffered a fatal heart attack. Louise Noun never remarried.

=== Art collection ===
Noun began her art collection at age thirteen when she was given an oil painting by Harry Lachman on her birthday, a story that was published in the Des Moines Register. While taking graduate courses in art history at Radcliffe College, Noun's interest in art grew; she later professed that she collected, without focus, works by Arthur Dove, Lyonel Feininger, and Henry Moore. Noun first collected art by women in 1963, purchasing art by Isabel Bishop. Finding the work without a signature, Noun contacted the artist and developed a friendship. Other works by female artists collected by Noun include Natalia Goncharova, Hannah Höch, Frida Kahlo, Käthe Kollwitz, Gabriele Münter, Agnes Pelton, and Marguerite Zorach. Some female artists protested the idea of women's only art collections, citing that segregating art collections implied that a women's only art collection was of a lesser value. One artist Noun collected, Dorothea Tanning, refused to show her work in women's only art shows. She left part of her collection to the Des Moines Art Center.

== Activism ==
In 1944, Louise Noun joined the Des Moines chapter of the League of Women Voters and served as president in 1948–1949, igniting her long career of activism and philanthropy. Noun served as the president of the Iowa Civil Liberties Union (now the ACLU of Iowa) for 8 years from 1964 to 1972. In the late 1960s, Noun helped finance the landmark U.S. Supreme Court students' rights case Tinker v. Des Moines Independent Community School District, with her brother Joseph Rosenfield. Noun was a founding member of the Iowa Women's Political Caucus (1973) and the National Organization for Women (NOW) Des Moines chapter, serving as coordinator from 1972 and president from 1972 to 1974. Noun served on several committees including the Bernie Lorenz Recovery House (1988), of the Young Women's Resource Center (1975–1982), and the American Friends Service Committee. Noun founded the Chrysalis Foundation in 1989, serving as president until her death in 2002.

== Iowa Women's Archives ==
Louise Noun and Mary Louise Smith, the former chair of the Republican National Committee, worked together to found the Iowa Women's Archives at the University of Iowa Main Library. The idea was conceived by Noun in the 1960s while researching Strong-Minded Women: The Emergence of the Woman-Suffrage Movement in Iowa. To fund the archives, Noun sold Frida Kahlo's 1947 painting "Self-Portrait with Loose Hair" at Christie's New York for 1.65 million dollars. The sale set a record for the most expensive work by a Latin American artist ever sold at auction. The painting was originally purchased by Noun for $85,000 in 1983. The University of Iowa Foundation undertook fundraising to contribute half a million dollars for the archives, which opened in 1992. The Louise Noun-Mary Louise Smith Iowa Women's Archives is open to the public and currently contains over 1100 manuscript collections of personal papers and records which record women's history in Iowa and other communities.

== Louise Noun Library ==
The Louise Noun Library opened in March 2017 at Des Moines' Young Women's Resource Center.

== Death ==
Noun died on August 23, 2002, in Des Moines, Iowa. With declining health, Noun committed suicide by drug overdose, leaving behind a note denouncing the illegality of assisted suicide, which she termed her "final project" in her suicide note. This was in keeping with her personality and beliefs, friends said.

"It has kicked off a debate about the importance of people being able to control their own lives, something that was always important to her," said Gil Cranberg, who served with Ms. Noun on the national board of the American Civil Liberties Union in the 1970s.

She was preceded in death by her daughter, who died one day earlier from complications related to brain cancer. Her grandson Jason is her only immediate survivor.

== Awards and legacy ==
Noun was inducted into the Iowa Women's Hall of Fame in 1981. Among the many honors and awards Noun received after induction were:

- Arts/Humanities/Aging Honor for outstanding service awarded by the Iowa Arts Council,
- Iowa Humanities Board member;
- Iowa Women's Hall of Fame, 1981
- Doctor of Humane Letters, honorary degree awarded by Cornell College, 1985
- Doctor of Humane Letters, an honorary degree, awarded by Drake University, 1991
- Outstanding Achievement Award in the Arts, given by the Iowa Arts Council on its 25th anniversary, 1992
- Peterson-Harlan Award, which recognizes an individual, group or organization that has made significant long-term or continuing contributions to Iowa history, 1993
- The Cristine Wilson Medal for Equality and Justice, 1993
- The Des Moines Roosevelt High School Hall of Fame, 1993
- The University of Iowa Alumni Award, 1994; the Philanthropic Vision Award from the Ms. Foundation, 1995
- The Award for Lifetime Services to the Public Humanities from the Iowa Humanities Board, 1996.

== Bibliography ==
Louise Noun wrote four books on feminism in Iowa and an autobiography. Her final book, Leader and Pariah: Annie Savery and the Campaign for Women's Rights in Iowa was published posthumously by the Iowa Women's Archives in November 2002.

- Strong-Minded Women: The Emergence of the Woman-Suffrage Movement in Iowa (1969), ISBN 978-0813816029
- Iowa Women in the WPA (1999), ISBN 978-0813826479
- Journey to Autonomy: A Memoir (1990), ISBN 978-0813823584
- More Strong-Minded Women: Iowa Feminists Tell Their Stories (1992), ISBN 978-0813818191
- Leader and Pariah: Annie Savery and the Campaign for Women's Rights in Iowa (2002), ISBN 978-0874141290
