= Iowa Women's Archives =

Coordinates: 41.6595°N 91.5384°W

The Louise Noun-Mary Louise Smith Iowa Women's Archives is located on the third floor of the Main Library in the University of Iowa Libraries system in Iowa City, Iowa. It was funded when Louise Noun sold a Frida Kahlo painting titled "Self Portrait with Loose Hair" for $1.65 million through Christie's in New York on May 15, 1991. "It is fitting that the Archives was funded by the sale of a Frida Kahlo painting…[as] Kahlo's paintings have been rescued from obscurity in recent years…the IWA was meant to rescue the papers of Iowa women from obscurity, neglect, or destruction…"

The Archives was officially established in 1992 and is named after its two founders, Noun and Mary Louise Smith.

== History ==
While researching for her book, (Strong Minded Women, 1969), Noun recognized a need for an archive that would hold women's papers and history. Noun "later shared with Mary Louise Smith her frustration about the scarcity of primary sources by and about women, and the two determined to establish a repository to document the experiences and achievements of women in Iowa."

The Archives officially opened on October 28, 1992.

The first curator hired was Karen Mason, who is still working at the Archives in 2014. Mason has written papers discussing her work at the Archive. The Archive has four basic approaches to collecting papers. The Archive will publicize interest in women's papers, write letters of solicitation to individuals or groups, sponsor or attend events, or establish good working relationships with people around the state. The first collection initiative the Archive proceeded with was the African American women project in 1995, and the second was in 1998 - the Rural Women's Project.

The special projects listed below will go into more detail on the history of the Archives.

== Special Projects ==
=== "Giving Our History A Home: A Celebration of African American Women in Iowa" ===
As it is understood by the above Mission, the Archive was established to collect the papers of groups that were underrepresented in archives. After the first two years of collecting papers, the Archive noted it had only established a small collection of papers by African American women. By 1995, "the Archives was able to hire Kathryn Neal as assistant archivist to undertake the African American Women in Iowa Project." Neal created her own mission statement and plan to undertake the project of collecting papers of African American women from around the state. The plan for that project was "1. Establish a manuscripts acquisitions program for the collection of materials that pertain to African American women in Iowa; 2. Publicize the project using a variety of media methods; 3. Develop and implement an oral history program to record the experiences of African American women in Iowa; 4. Create a comprehensive guide to African American women's collections at the IWA." Through her 3 years working as an archivist, Neal was successful in accumulating a set of 50 papers for the collection.

=== Rural Women's Project ===
The Rural Women's Project began in 1998. With a grant from the Iowa Farm Bureau Foundation, the Archive was able to hire an assistant temporary archivist for two years named Doris Malkmus. As Malkmus traveled around the state, she collected diaries, account books, photo albums, and scrapbooks. When the project ended in 2001, more than 100 collections of rural women were collected, and they "provide rich resources that chronicle the lives and experiences of rural and farm women throughout Iowa's history."

=== Mujeres Latinas Project ===
This project was undertaken by the Archives in 2005 to preserve the history of Latinas in Iowa over the years. The lives of Latinas in Iowa are often those of migrant workers that travel year round following the crops. With the sort of mobile and busy life led by migrant farm workers, the women often were unable to be educated or did not have the time to learn to read or write. They did not create written papers of their own, and there were very few newspaper articles written about them. With that in mind, the Archive chose to create oral histories for these women. "Oral recordings have the added value of conveying emotion and character in a way that papers cannot. For a researcher, listening to a recording and a manner of speaking – accents, intonation, pauses, laughter, crying – creates a more intimate connection with the speaker and can contribute to a better understanding of her experience." When these women record their stories, they are also recording the stories of their families as well, because the stories of all migrant farm workers are underrepresented. In July 2016 the Iowa Women's Archives launched the Migration is Beautiful website.

=== Women's Suffrage Project ===
In 2010, 90 years after women were granted the right to vote the "Iowa Women's Archives received a grant from the State Historical Society, Inc., to create a digital collection of suffrage documents." The digital collection contains the following, and can be found at the Women's Suffrage in Iowa: A Digital Collection page:

==== Women's Suffrage in Iowa Digital Collection ====
A Collection of images and documents available through the Iowa Digital Library.

==== Iowa's Suffrage Scrapbook ====
An online exhibit that provides an overview of the suffrage movement in Iowa and includes links to other resources on women's suffrage in Iowa and beyond.

==== Women's Suffrage in Iowa: A Sneak Peek of a New Digital Collection ====
An exhibit created at the beginning of the project in summer 2010.

=== Jewish Women in Iowa Project ===
The Archive is in the process of creating the Jewish Women in Iowa Project. It is searching and calling for women in Iowa to donate papers and collections of Jewish women in Iowa to cultivate a history.
