= Joseph Rosenfield =

American lawyer and businessman

- Born: May 16, 1904
- Died: June 7, 2000 (aged 96)
- Citizenship: American
- Education: graduated from Grinnell College J.D. from the University of Iowa College of Law
- Occupations: lawyer and businessman

Joseph Frankel Rosenfield (May 16, 1904 – June 7, 2000) was an American lawyer and businessman.

Rosenfield graduated from Grinnell College in 1925 and earned a J.D. from the University of Iowa College of Law in 1928. He practiced law with a Des Moines law firm until 1947. Upon the death of his father Meyer Rosenfield in 1929, Rosenfield became the head of Younkers department store, which had merged with his family's retail business, and retired in 1964 as president and chairman of the board.

His work for Harold Hughes' election landed him on the master list of Nixon political opponents.

Rosenfield and his sister, Louise Noun, helped finance the Tinker v. Des Moines Independent Community School District to promote free speech among students protesting the Vietnam War.

His friendships with Warren Buffett and Robert Noyce were key factors in the growth of Grinnell College's endowment during his time as a Grinnell College trustee. Buffett described Rosenfield as an "extraordinarily generous and smart man" and father figure: "I'd never have wanted to replace my real father—but if after my dad's death I could have adopted Joe as my father, I would have."

In addition, Rosenfield was at one time chief minority stakeholder in the Chicago Cubs.

The Joe Rosenfield '25 Center at Grinnell College acts as a general campus center, containing the student cafeteria, administrative offices, and classrooms.
