= The Wounded Table =

Painting by Frida Kahlo

- La mesa herida (Spanish)
- Replica of The Wounded Table
- Artist: Frida Kahlo
- Year: 1940
- Medium: Oil on wood
- Dimensions: 122 cm × 244 cm (48 in × 96 in)
- Condition: lost

The Wounded Table (La mesa herida in Spanish) is an oil painting by Mexican artist Frida Kahlo. Although lost in 1955, three photos of this painting were taken between 1940 and 1944. The painting was first displayed in January 1940 at the International Surrealism Exhibit at Inés Amor's Gallery of Mexican Art in Mexico City, and a replica is currently displayed in the Kunstmuseum Gehrke-Remund, Baden-Baden, Germany. The painting was last exhibited in Warsaw in 1955, after which it disappeared, and is the subject of an ongoing international search.

== Description ==
The painting reflects ongoing themes in Kahlo's work, including Mexicanidad, indigeneity, self-portraiture, and grief/loss. Kahlo is seated at the center of the table where figures previously seen in her painting The Four Inhabitants of Mexico City also appear. The table is spattered with blood and framed by a theatrical curtain, providing a stagelike setting, and she is surrounded by a precolumbian Nayarit figurine (part of her by now ex-husband Diego Rivera's collection), a papier-mâché skeleton (often called a Judas-like figure), two children, and her pet deer Granizo.

In The Wounded Table, "Kahlo is no longer a bewildered child but an adult-sized Kahlo sitting at the table." Kahlo bleeds as a martyr for Mexicanidad, she comments on the performative aspects of Mexican identity. It supports Roger Bartr’s analysis of post-revolutionary culture. In The Wounded Table, Kahlo parodies the stereotypes of mexicanness.

A Tehuana-clad Kahlo shares a long table with the cord- and dynamite-wrapped male figure and the skeleton of Four Inhabitants. Her long dark hair is lifted up and draped over the skeleton's arm, tying the two figures together. Seated between Kahlo and the skeleton is a small Nayarit sculpture. The long arm of the sculpture extends toward Kahlo and, near her shoulder, merges with hers. Blood oozes from wounds in the table, the man's feet, and the skeleton. It pools near the hem of the Tehuana dress and splatters onto the skirt. Blood is never far removed from the heart, and in this particular work the skeleton is touched by the bloodheart linking the skeletal death figure with the heart-life.

== Attempted sale ==
In June 2019 Mexican authorities announced the arrest of a man in Morelos State who was attempting to sell the painting. Officials were tipped off when he attempted to have the contract of sale certified by a notary public. According to the documents, the painting would have been sent to a buyer in London in exchange for a Mex$20 million house in Acapulco. Mexican officials said the sale could have been a fraud since the detainee did not physically present the painting.

== See also ==
- List of paintings by Frida Kahlo
