= What the Water Gave Me (song) =

2011 promotional single by Florence and the Machine

Promotional single by Florence and the Machine

from the album Ceremonials
- Released: 23 August 2011
- Recorded: 2011
- Genre: Pop rock; alternative rock; soul; gothic rock
- Length: 5:32 (album version); 4:09 (radio edit)
- Label: Island
- Songwriters: Florence Welch; Francis White
- Producer: Paul Epworth

Music video
- "What the Water Gave Me" on YouTube

"What the Water Gave Me" is a song by English indie rock band Florence and the Machine from their second studio album, Ceremonials (2011). The song was written by lead singer Florence Welch and Francis "Eg" White, and produced by Paul Epworth. It was released on 23 August 2011 as the first promotional single from Ceremonials. After the band performed the song in Berkeley, California, on 12 June 2011, the studio version premiered on Florence and the Machine's official website. Welch decided to name the song "What the Water Gave Me" after seeing the 1938 Frida Kahlo painting of the same name. During an interview, she confirmed that the song was inspired by English writer Virginia Woolf.

"What the Water Gave Me" is a pop, pop rock and soul song performed in tempo of 124 beats per minute. It incorporates several instruments into its composition, most notably harps and guitar. The accompanying music video for the song was filmed at Abbey Road Studios and it showed the band recording and singing the song. Upon its release, the song made its way into several chart most notably at number 24 on the UK Singles Chart. It also became the second song by Florence and the Machine which charted on the US Billboard Hot 100.

== Background ==
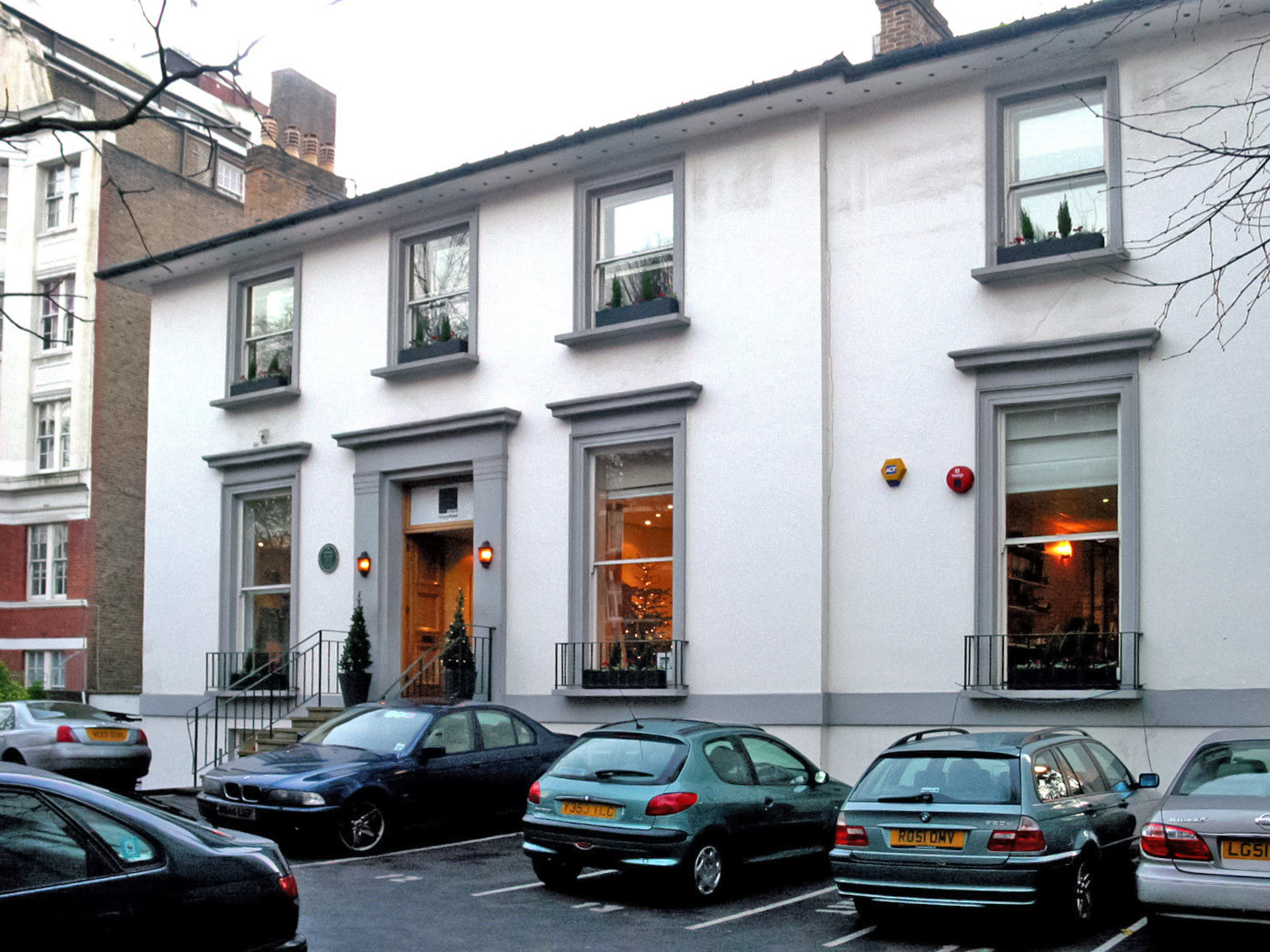
The song was recorded at Abbey Road Studios in London

"What the Water Gave Me" was written by Florence Welch and Francis "Eg" White and produced by Paul Epworth. It was recorded in London at Abbey Road Studios. The song was debuted by Florence and the Machine during a live show in Berkeley, California on 12 June 2011. After that, the band added the song to the set list of their tour, Lungs Tour and on 23 August 2011 the album version of the song premiered on Florence and the Machine's official website.

Welch elaborated on the title and meaning of the song: "It's a song for the water, because in music and art what I'm really interested in are the things that are overwhelming. The ocean seems to me to be nature's great overwhelmer. When I was writing this song I was thinking a lot about all those people who've lost their lives in vain attempts to save their loved ones from drowning. It's about water in all forms and all bodies. It's about a lot of things; Virginia Woolf creeps into it, and of course Frida Kahlo, whose painfully beautiful painting gave me the title". During an interview with NME, Welch revealed how she looked in Frida Kahlo painting by saying, "At lot of the time when I'm writing, things will just appear. I was writing the song and this book on symbolism was lying around, and it had the painting in it. It's nice to mix the ordinary with extraordinary". She further stated that the song talked about "children who are swept out to sea, and their parents go in after them and try to rescue them".

== Composition ==
According to the sheet music published on the website Musicnotes.com by Universal Music Publishing Group, "What the Water Gave Me" is a pop, pop rock and soul song set in a common time and performed in tempo of 124 beats per minute. It is written in the key of C minor and Welch's vocal range in the song runs from the musical note of A♭_{3} to E♭_{5}.

"What the Water Gave Me" is five and half minutes long and contains ethereal vocals and harps. A gospel organ and choir along with "trilling" guitars provide instrumentation in "What the Water Gave Me". According to Bill Lamb of About.com, "the song breaks down into a near a cappella chorus three minutes into the song in gorgeous fashion, but it is only a foreshadowing of what is to come". A writer for the Los Angeles Times wrote that the song consisted of "soaring gospel-rooted harmonies and tribal chants on top of ethereal harp strings and intense lyrics". Another writer for NME stated that the song starts as a gothic track from the 1980s and compared it with songs by The Cure and Siouxsie and the Banshees.

In the end of the song, Welch tries a "new, softly-softly vocal style" which is similar to Liz Fraser and Harriet Wheeler from The Sundays. Commenting the sound of the song, Jillian Mapes of Billboard said that "'What the Water Gave Me' crescendos with a tribal intensity, balancing chants against an airy, whimsical harp". Spin's William Goodman called the song "a surge of gospel-tinged pop with harp, piano, and throbbing bass driving under Welch's powerful vocals" Writing for the website HitFix, Katie Hasty said: "the harp line is just about the lightest part of the song, as the bass is overdriven and choirs, major crash cymbals and Welch's quiet-loud-quiet dynamics make for sad, bombastic, rattling – yet euphoric – poetry".

The main theme of the song is Virginia Woolf's death; her walking into the water with her pockets filled with stones is the theme of the song. A writer for The Guardian wrote that in the song, "Welch [is] mixing images of suicide with declarations of undying love over fluttering harp and robust guitar". The song references to the sun, stones and Atlas and according to NME it's an ode to the ominous inhabitants of Flora and Fauna-ville.

== Critical reception ==
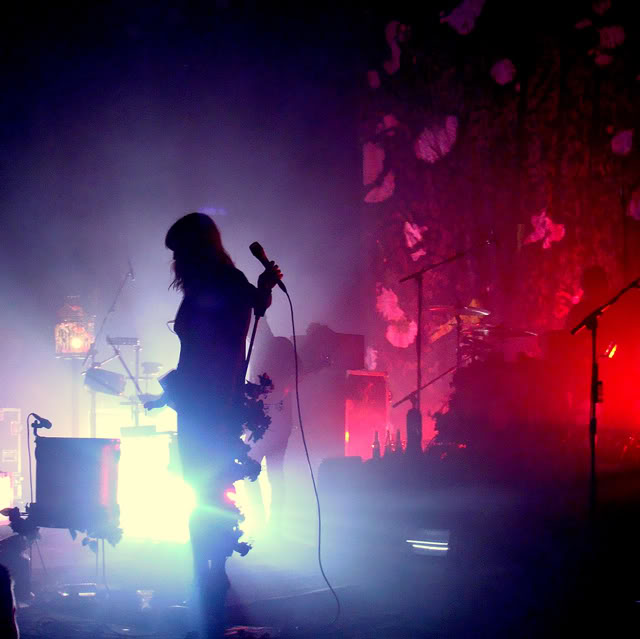
Florence and the Machine performing at the O2 ABC Glasgow during their Lungs Tour

"What the Water Gave Me" was praised by music critics, several of whom labelled the song "epic". Fan reaction towards the song was also very positive. Simon Vozick-Levinson of Rolling Stone magazine gave it a rating of three-and-a-half stars, writing that the song "opens softly, with Welch cooing slightly spooky pastoral poetry ("Time, it took us to where the water was")". However he further wrote, "soon enough, she's out-and-out howling about learning to let go after a failed relationship, ancient Greek giants and possibly drowning herself. Her veiled incantations feel like the stuff of myth, even if it's not entirely clear how the images relate to one another". Another writer of the same publication felt the song was "overwhelming in its bombast, yet delicate in its sonic detail".

Bill Lamb of the website About.com gave the song five out of five stars and complimented the powerful concept, the "explosion" of musical joy in the closing minutes, Welch's engaging, ethereal vocals and the haunting words. He added that "for the final two minutes of the song restraint is abandoned and Florence and the Machine unleash something that sounds simply like revelatory joy". He finished his review by writing, "If there is justice in the US pop music world, 'What the Water Gave Me' will be the next 'Rolling in the Deep.' It is a recording that shows us just how emotionally powerful and engaging a pop song can be". Writing for the website HitFix, Katie Hasty concluded: "For a song that goes for 5+ minutes, about a legendary writer that drowns herself, titled for a famous painted work and performed by Florence + The Machine, the word 'epic' is perfectly acceptable".

James Montgmery of MTV News praised the song calling it "epically massive" and added that it "seems destined to rule the festival circuit for the foreseeable future". A writer for The Guardian concluded that the song "has enough melody to stop it from collapsing under the weight of its own drama. This delicate balance gives the song its edge". Entertainment Weekly's Kyle Anderson praised the song calling it "lovely, passionate, and intense" and concluded that it was very different from the songs on Lungs. He ended his review by saying that Welch, "put her new-found ability to summon string sections to excellent use". A writer of NME concluded, "The track builds into the kind of re-affirming epic that anyone would be proud of. A great way to follow up 'Lungs'. We think it's a winner". Rebecca Ford of The Hollywood Reporter simply called the song "hypnotizing". Jillian Mapes from Billboard said that "The word 'epic' is almost too weak" to describe the song. The Miami New Times' S. Pajot called the song "perfect soundtrack for lovesick self-sacrifice" before adding that it was very "sleepy". On the Triple J Hottest 100 list, "What the Water Gave Me" was ranked at number 42.

== Commercial performance ==
The song debuted at number 91 on the Billboard Hot 100 which was the band's second appearance on the chart after "Dog Days Are Over" from the album Lungs. On the Australian Singles Chart, "What the Water Gave Me" debuted at number 35 on 11 September 2011 and it fell to number 43 the next week. In New Zealand, the song debuted at number 15 on 28 August 2011 and it fell to number 35 the next week. It performed better on the UK Singles Chart where it peaked at number 24 on 3 September 2011 and in Ireland where it peaked at number 13.

== Music video ==
A video for the song premiered on YouTube on 23 August 2011. Welch also shared the news about it on her official Twitter. The video shows footage of the band working with producer Paul Epworth during recording sessions at Abbey Road Studios, interspersed with shots of Welch performing the song. A writer of the magazine Rolling Stone praised the video saying that it founds the band "pushing their secular gospel sound to an explosive extreme". Leah Collins writing for Dose concluded that the video contained several kaleidoscopic performances and added that "the glimpses of the studio" proves that it was "more raucous" because of the table-dancing. Jillian Mapes of Billboard said that "Florence gets giddy in the studio and ethereal on stage" for the video. Emily Cronin of the British Elle stated, "the video packs all the witchy vocals and diaphanous gowns we could have hoped for into five and a half minutes, with a choir and one jaunty fedora thrown in". She further described the video as "taster".

== Track listing ==
- Digital download
1. "What the Water Gave Me" – 5:32

== Charts ==
Chart (2011)	Peak position
Australia (ARIA)	35
Belgium (Ultratip Bubbling Under Flanders)	2
Belgium (Ultratip Bubbling Under Wallonia)	42
Canada Hot 100 (Billboard)	72
Ireland (IRMA)	13
New Zealand (Recorded Music NZ)	15
Scotland Singles (OCC)	24
UK Singles (OCC)	24
US Billboard Hot 100	91
US Alternative Airplay (Billboard)	29
US Hot Rock & Alternative Songs (Billboard)	34

== Certifications ==
Certifications for "What the Water Gave Me"
Region	Certification	Certified units/sales
Australia (ARIA)	Gold	35,000^{^}
United States (RIAA)	Gold	500,000^{‡}
^{^} Shipments figures based on certification alone.^{‡} Sales+streaming figures based on certification alone.

== Release history ==
Region	Date	Format	Label	Ref.
United Kingdom	23 August 2011	Digital download	Island	
United States	24 August 2011	Digital download	Island	
