= Sky and Water II =

1938 lithograph print by M. C. Escher

- Artist: M. C. Escher
- Year: 1938
- Type: lithograph
- Dimensions: 62.3 cm × 40.7 cm (24.5 in × 16.0 in)

Sky and Water II is a lithograph print by the Dutch artist M. C. Escher first printed in 1938. It is similar to the woodcut Sky and Water I, which was first printed only months earlier.

== See also ==
- Tessellation

== Sources ==
- M. C. Escher—The Graphic Work; Taschen Publishers.
- M. C. Escher—29 Master Prints; Harry N. Abrams, Inc., Publishers.
