= SS Alba =

Coordinates: 50.218285°N 5.487438°W

History
- Owner: Burger B.
- Port of registry: (Panama)
- Builder: Detroit Shipbuilding Company, Wyandotte, Michigan
- Launched: 1920
- Fate: Sank 31 January 1938

General characteristics
- Tonnage: 2,310 tons
- Length: 76.5 m (251 ft)
- Beam: 13 m (43 ft)
- Installed power: Triple expansion steam engine; 2 × boilers 265 hp (198 kW)
- Propulsion: Single shaft
- Speed: 9 knots (17 km/h; 10 mph)

SS Alba was a Panamanian-registered ship owned by Burger B. that sank off St Ives in Cornwall, England on 31 January 1938.

== Shipwreck ==
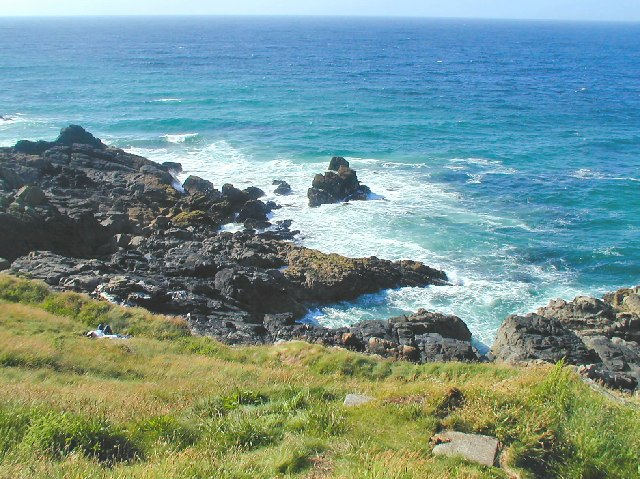
Where the SS Alba perished

Alba was seeking shelter from rough seas driven by a northwesterly gale and her captain, Joseph Horvath, guided her into St Ives Bay. He mistook the lights of Porthmeor for the lights of St Ives, and Alba went aground on the Three Brothers Rocks.

All Alba's 23 crew members were initially rescued on the first run by the local RNLI lifeboat Caroline Parsons, but the lifeboat overturned on its way to shore. With its engine not working, Caroline Parsons was driven ashore.

Using torches and lamps rescuers managed to save all the members of the RNLI's crew, but five of Alba's crew died. Three bodies were brought ashore and two others were never found. An inquest on the three was held on 2 February 1938, and returned a finding of accidental death. The Times records them as Ernest Stitanovic, first engineer aged 50 from Budapest; Gyulya Szabo, second engineer aged 28 from Tapocla, Hungary; and George Kovacs, mess-room boy aged 26 from Budapest, and notes that "The two missing bodies have not yet been recovered". Two of the crew, named as engineers Ernest Stipanovi and Gyula Szabo, are commemorated on a plaque in Barnoon cemetery. Several sources incorrectly state that only two of the crew died.

At the inquest it was asserted that the Godrevy Lighthouse shone less brightly since its recent conversion to an unmanned light, the implication being that this might have contributed to the accident.

== Specifications ==
Weighing in at 2,310 tons Alba was a steel ship built by the Detroit Shipbuilding Company in Detroit, USA, in 1920. She was 76.5 metres (251 ft) long, 13 metres (43 ft) wide and 6.5 metres (21 ft) tall, powered by steam propulsion using 2 boilers giving 265 horsepower (198 kW) and a speed of 9 knots (17 km/h; 10 mph), which may be a reason why she could not reverse fast enough on the fateful night.

== SS Alba in art ==
Alfred Wallis painted several versions of Wreck of the Alba, one of which is held by Tate St Ives.

== False alarm ==
Alba's boiler can still be seen on the beach and in September 2012 bomb disposal experts were summoned from Plymouth after holidaymakers misidentified it as an unexploded bomb.
