= Duane Armstrong =

American painter (born 1938)

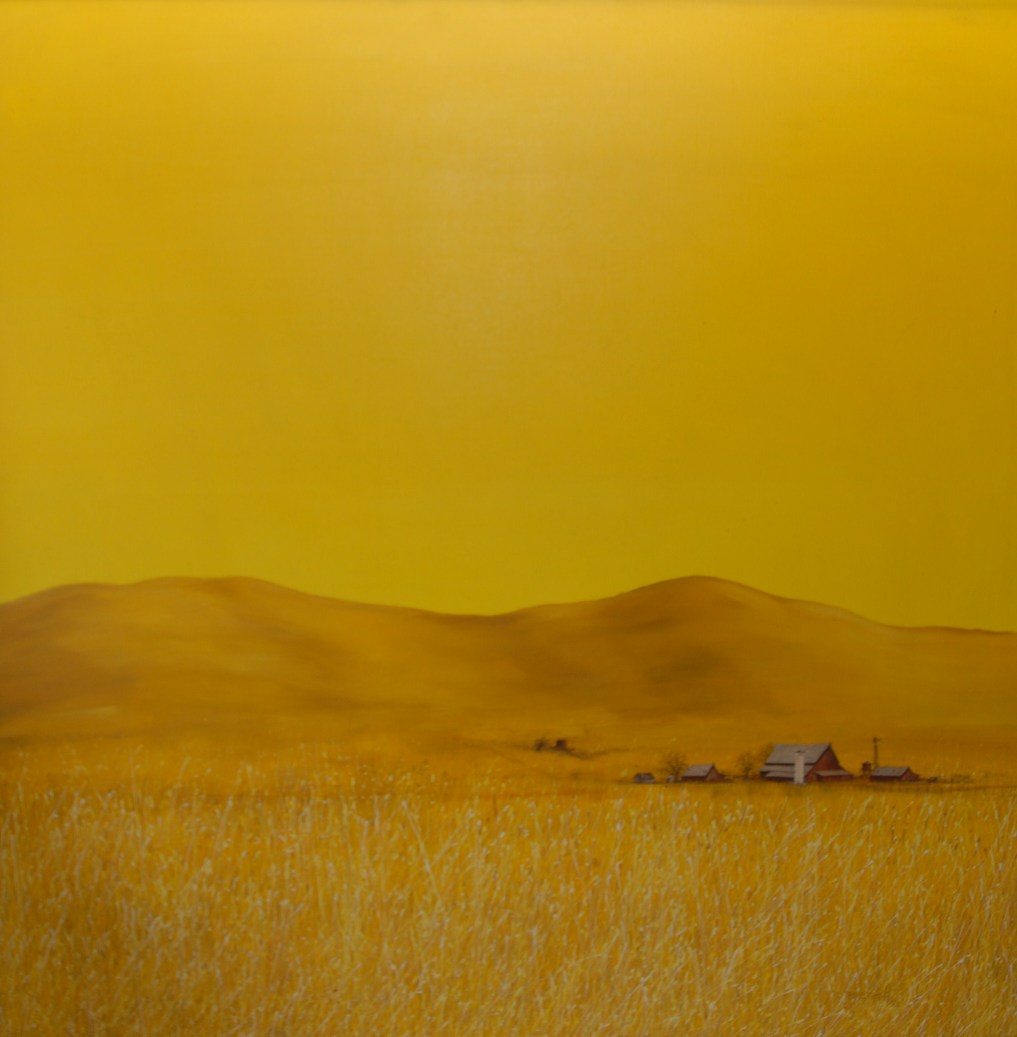
Untitled, 1975, from his "Fields of Grass" series, by Duane Armstrong

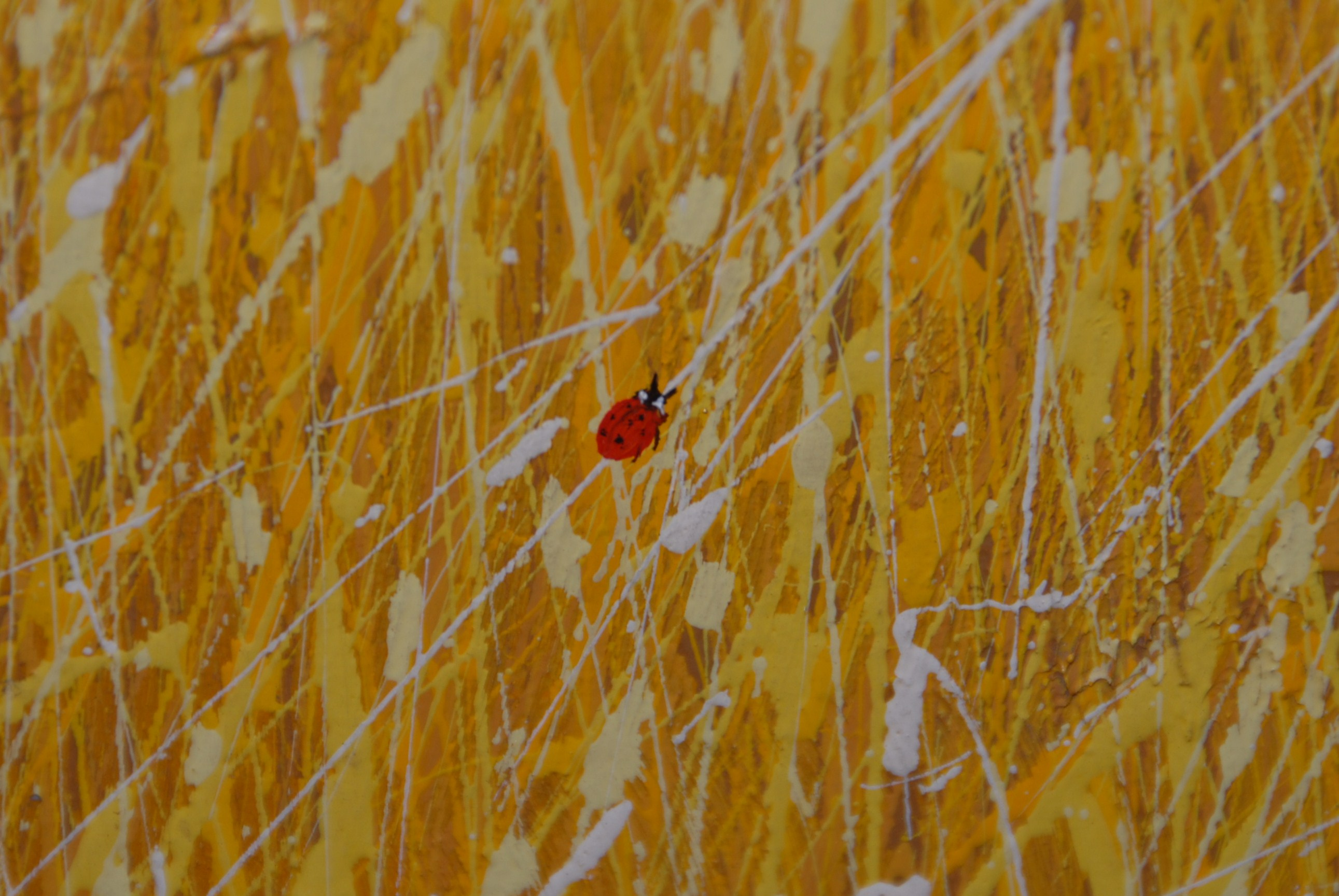
Duane Armstrong ladybug from Untitled, 1975, "Fields of Grass" series

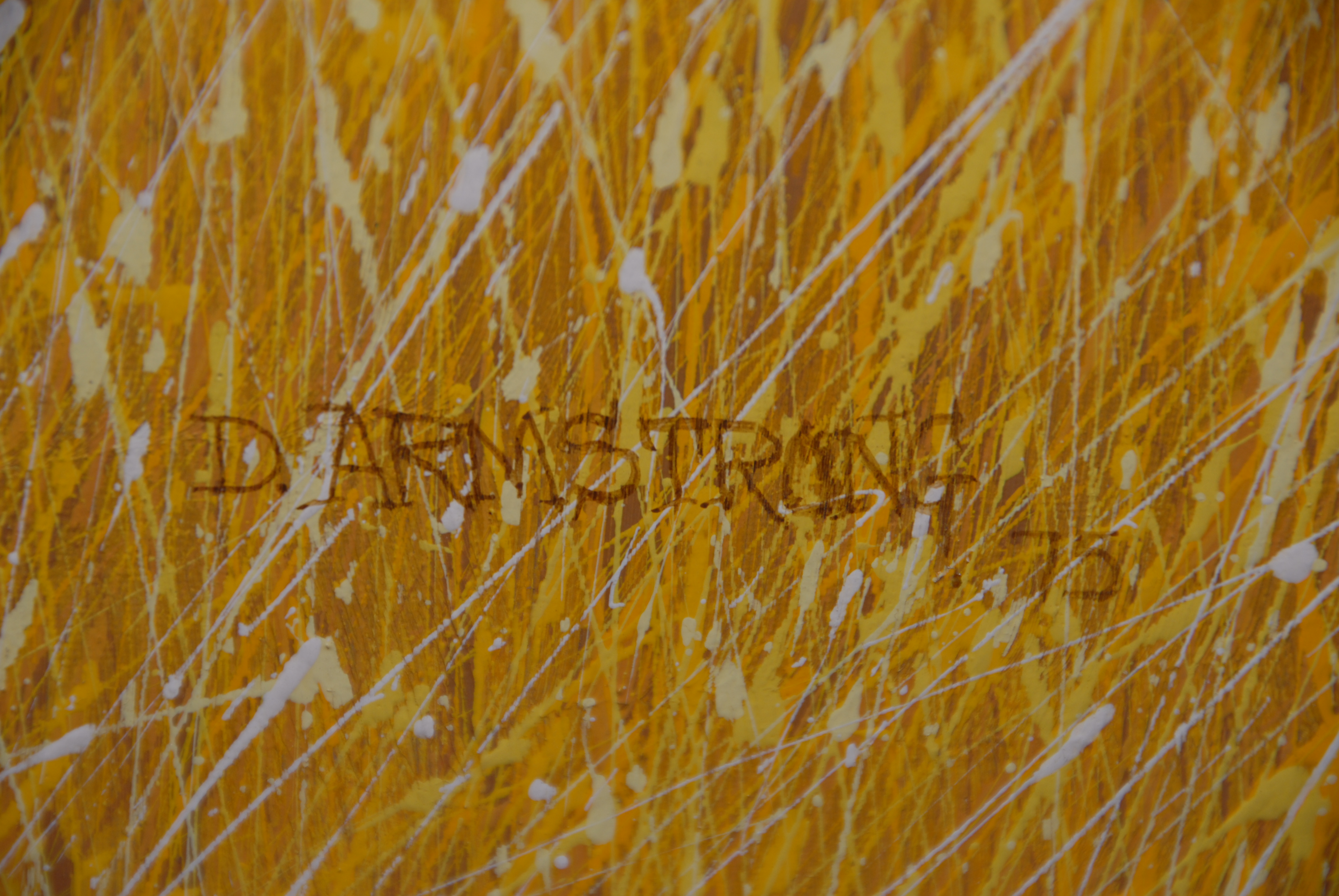
Duane Armstrong signature from Untitled, 1975

Duane Albert Armstrong (born December 25, 1938) is an American painter, best known for his oil on canvas paintings. He was born in Fresno California, and was raised near San Luis Obispo California. His foster mother taught him to paint as a child.

His best-known works are his "Fields of Grass" series of oil on canvas paintings, which depict California landscapes and are noted for their inclusion of a small ladybug near the bottom of some or all of the paintings in the series. A story claims that he began adding the ladybug to his "Fields of Grass" paintings after a customer saw one in another painting and requested he add it to the painting she just bought.

Armstrong has painted over 7,000 paintings, over 185 of which are in print, including reproductions by Heritage Publications, Illinois Moulding Co., Windsor Art Co., Turner Art Co., Continental Art Co., and Art Market International. His work is included in the exhibitions of Stanford University, the de Saisset Museum at Santa Clara University, and in the Cal Poly Graphic Communication Support Program Gallery.

== Galleries and exhibitions ==
- A.D.I. Gallery, San Francisco, California (1970–1975)
- Art About Gallery, Capitola, California (1981)
- Art Design and Investment Company, San Francisco, California (1970–1975)
- Artworks International, Santa Clara, California (1983–1987)
- The Beverly Hills Art Show (1980)
- Bridgeway Gallery, Sausalito, California (1985–1989)
- C.R. Ebert Gallery, San Jose, California (1987)
- The Carter Gallery, Los Angeles, California (1967–1974)
- Chabot Galleries, Cupertino & San Jose, California (1973–1977)
- The Copenhagen Gallery, Solvang, California (1969–1973)
- Discovery Gallery, Mill Valley, California (1982)
- Distelheim Gallery, Chicago, Illinois (1968)
- E.W. Norwitt Company, San Francisco, California (1974)
- The Encounter, Boulder Creek, California (1975–1984)
- Erica's Gallery, Carmel, Saratoga & Ventura, California (1972–1990)
- Erickson's Gallery, Palo Alto, California (1967–1977)
- Fine Arts Association, Playa Del Rey, California (1976–1977)
- The Friendship Gallery, Los Gatos, California (1987)
- Gallery 21, Salt Lake City, Utah (1968–1970)
- Gallery DeTours, Carmel & San Francisco, California (1967–1974)
- Gilbert Gallery, San Francisco & Palm Springs, California (1966–1974)
- Haakman Gallery, Palm Springs & Ventura, California (1987–present)
- Les Cousins Gallery, Concord, California (1980)
- The Lincoln Gallery, Carmel, California (1969)
- Los Robles Gallery, Palo Alto, California (1967)
- M.G.M. Grand Hotel Gallery, Reno, Nevada (1986)
- Margaret Keene Gallery, Honolulu, Hawaii (1973)
- Masters International Gallery, Campbell, California (1967–1974)
- The Mulberry Gallery, Capitola, California (1985)
- Norwood Gallery, Denver, Colorado (1967–1973)
- The Palette Gallery, San Jose, California (1975–1978)
- The Phoenix Gallery, Willow Glen, California (1984)
- Parkhurst Galleries, Queen Mary Lines,
- Long Beach & Laguna Beach, California (1975)
- Parks Art Gallery, San Jose, California (1963)
- Paul Masson Mountain Winery, Saratoga, California (1986)
- Rene Andrew Galleries, Sacramento, California (1988)
- Studio Gallery, Beverly Hills, California (1999)
- Swanson Galleries, Carmel, San Francisco,
- Sausalito & Washington, D.C. (1976–1981)
- The Tate Gallery, San Francisco, California (1981)
- The Thompson Gallery, Los Gatos, California (1967)
- Triton Museum, San Jose, California (1968)
- The Waldon Gallery, Los Gatos, California (1968–1970)
- West View Gallery, Willow Glen, California (1985)
- The Young Gallery, San Jose California (1977)
