= Takeshi Mizukoshi =

Japanese photographer (born 1938)

Takeshi Mizukoshi (水越 武, Mizukoshi Takeshi; born May 1, 1938) is a Japanese photographer.
