= What the Water Gave Me (painting) =

Painting by Frida Kahlo

- Lo que el agua me dio (Spanish)
- Artist: Frida Kahlo
- Year: 1938
- Type: Oil on canvas
- Dimensions: 91 cm × 70.5 cm (36 in × 27.75 in)
- Location: Collection of Daniel Filipacchi, Paris

What the Water Gave Me (Lo que el agua me dio in Spanish) is an oil painting by Frida Kahlo that was completed in 1938. It is sometimes referred to as What I Saw in the Water.

Frida Kahlo’s What the Water Gave Me has been called her biography. As the scholar Natascha Steed points out, "her paintings were all very honest and she never portrayed herself as being more or less beautiful than she actually was." With this piece she reflected on her life and memories. Kahlo released her unconscious mind through the use of what seems to be an irrational juxtaposition of images in her bathwater. In this painting, Frida paints herself, precisely her legs and feet, lying in a bath of grey water.

The painting was included in Kahlo's first solo exhibit at the Julien Levy Gallery in New York City in November 1938. It is now part of the private collection of Surrealist art collector Daniel Filipacchi.

== Description ==
Kahlo's toes point up from the water in a bathtub and are reflected back into the water. They dominate the painting, and, along with an underwater view of her thighs, are all that can be seen of her in this self-portrait. In the water float remnants of Kahlo's life. There is an island which holds a volcano erupting a skyscraper, a dead woodpecker perched upon a tree, and a small skeleton resting upon a hill. From this island a tight rope begins which creates a diamond-like shape within the center of the tub, and eventually wraps around the neck of a naked female figure, who floats Ophelia-like. From this female figure, who may represent Kahlo herself, the rope returns into the hand of a faceless man lounging on the edge of the island, who seems to be watching the woman that he is distantly strangling.

Also floating in the bathtub are an empty Mexican dress, a seashell full of bullet-holes, a couple that resemble Kahlo's parents from her earlier painting My Grandparents My Parents and I, and two female lovers who later reappear in her 1939 painting Two Nudes in a Forest.

== Interpretations ==
The painting references traditional and ancient iconography, mythology and symbolism, eroticism and botany all mapped out onto a scene depicting the legs of the artist herself (as signified by her wounded right foot) submerged in bath water. References to Kahlo's earlier works and influences have been noted. These include themes from her painting My Parents, My Grandparents and I (1936), allusions to fifteenth-century painter Hieronymus Bosch's The Garden of Earthly Delights in her attention to flora and fauna, and a reference to her political position by documenting the clash of the old and the new in the dramatic detail of a skyscraper burning inside a volcano. Among the various elements of macabre that are visible, a skeleton and a nude bather choked by a rope stand out.

What the Water Gave Me was Frida's memoir of her life, depicting life and death and comfort and loss. In the midst of her vision lies the way in which Frida found herself submerged by her life. Frida is quoted saying "I drank to drown my pain, but the damned pain learned how to swim, and now I am overwhelmed by this decent and good behavior." Scholar Graham Watt stated that a common feature of Kahlo's paintings is duality, as Kahlo painted "the body she lost and the body she had, her heterosexual and lesbian affairs, traditional and modern ways, Mexican and European, the closeness and treachery of those she loved, sadness and joy as well as the community of her world view and the loneliness of her position." Frida found only her hardships in her bath. In this portrait Kahlo appears lifeless as she lies in a bathtub submerged in water, her legs barely visible but her feet emerge from the water. Her right foot is bleeding and deformed, reflecting what was happening to her body while she suffered in pain.

Of the 30-plus operations she endured, most were on her back, right leg and right foot. Hence the wreckage in the painting over her right leg; between the toes of her right foot is a bleeding crack. Along with Kahlo‘s childhood polio that caused more than a slight deformity in her right leg. The spina bifida Kahlo suffered from is a congenital deformity, which results from incomplete closure of neural tube and a partially fused spinal cord. This decreased circulation to her limbs, together with polio and the 1925 streetcar accident, was the root of Kahlo’s chronic battle with neuropathic pain.

Like What the Water Gave Me, Frida’s paintings were very personal. It is written by Leticia Pérez Alonso that “in Kahlo’s painting the viewer ends up identifying with the represented object, and thus the distance between both of them is dissolved.” In order to bring her viewers as deep into her life as possible, the strong details in her painting made it so that the distance between the self and the other is obliterated so that they are to share in the same experience. Kahlo returned to the same symbols and figures that can be seen in her other paintings.

The Volcano itself is the cornerstone of this painting as it is a strong symbol of her no longer suppressing her feelings about her body, her relationship to her husband, Diego Rivera; the source of most of her passion, pain, and her self-worth. In her diary, Kahlo described herself as “the one who gave birth to herself.” A scholar concluded that she was starting to discover and experience both her own self and the world about her at a new more conscious level.” The eruption of the volcano mirrors her inevitable eruption.

What the Water Gave Me is a symbol of its own; a symbol of self-discovery. With this painting Frida Kahlo demonstrated her ability as a surreal artist who through her method of aggressive visual imagery, rather than verbal language, can convey the trauma of her own existence by putting herself on trial all while simultaneously creating art.

According to the critic Bertram Wolfe, Kahlo's paintings appeared to bring together surrealism and a "deep-rooted Mexican tradition".

On the basis of this painting, Kahlo was labeled a surrealist. Before this she never considered herself a “surrealist” she just utilized this portrait as her platform to express her hurt and expel her demons.

André Breton saw Kahlo's art as Surrealist, saying of her work, "The promises of fantasy are filled with greater splendor by reality itself!" For Breton, this work was exemplary of her Surrealism.

== Namesakes ==
- What the Water Gave Me: Poems after Frida Kahlo is a collection of poems by Pascale Petit released in 2010 that were inspired by and reference Kahlo's work. With regards to the present painting, Petit makes Kahlo say that it reveals "my half-drowned thoughts bobbing around my legs". Other descriptions of various elements seen in the painting include "The Empire State Building spewing gangrene / over my shin" and a "giant / one-legged quetzal pierced by a tree".
- "What the Water Gave Me" is a song by Florence and the Machine, and the first song released from their second studio album, Ceremonials (2011). It was written by Florence Welch with Francis White and produced by Paul Epworth. Welch decided to give the name to the song after viewing a Frida Kahlo work.

== See also ==
- List of paintings by Frida Kahlo
