= Mary Louise Smith (politician) =

American politician from Iowa (1914–1997)

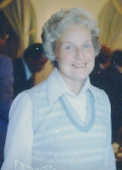

49th Chair of the Republican National Committee
- In office September 16, 1974 – January 15, 1977
- Preceded by: George H. W. Bush
- Succeeded by: Bill Brock

Personal details
- Born: Mary Louise Epperson; October 6, 1914 Eddyville, Iowa, U.S.
- Died: August 22, 1997 (aged 82) Des Moines, Iowa, U.S.
- Party: Republican
- Education: University of Iowa (BA)

Mary Louise Smith (October 6, 1914 – August 22, 1997), a U.S. political organizer and women's rights activist, was the second woman to become chair of a major political party in the United States after Jean Westwood and was the first woman to become chair of the RNC.

== Life and career ==
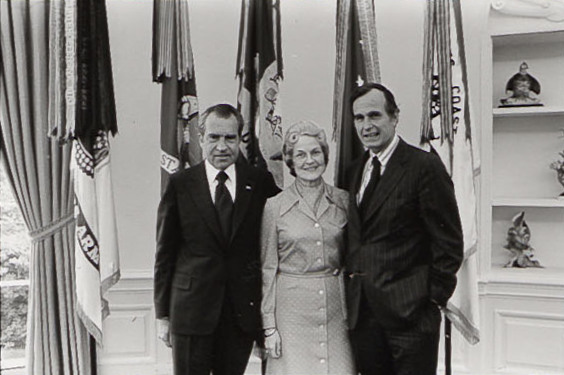
Smith with President Richard Nixon and George H. W. Bush in 1974

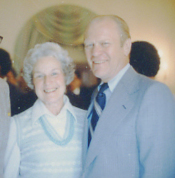
Smith with President Gerald Ford in 1974

Born Mary Louise Epperson in Eddyville, Iowa, she married medical student Elmer M. Smith while both were studying at the University of Iowa. She graduated in 1935 with a degree in social work administration and worked for the Iowa Employment Relief Administration in Iowa City.

After moving to Eagle Grove she became active in civic life and Republican Party politics. She became membership chair of the Iowa Council of Republican Women in 1961 and was elected vice-chairwoman of the Wright County Republican Central Committee the following year. She was elected national committeewoman for Iowa in 1964, a post she held for the next twenty years.

In 1974, during the wake of the Watergate scandal, President Gerald Ford named her the first female chair of the Republican National Committee. She held that post until 1977, and in that role became the first woman of her party, and second woman of a major party, to organize a presidential nominating convention, the 1976 Republican National Convention in Kansas City. In 1977, she was inducted in the Iowa Women's Hall of Fame. In 1978, she served as Co-Manager of the Committee for Governor Ray in the successful fourth re-election campaign of Iowa Governor Robert D. Ray.

In 1979, the Supersisters trading card set was produced and distributed; one of the cards featured Smith's name and picture.

She campaigned for George H. W. Bush in the 1980 primaries, but supported Ronald Reagan both in the 1980 and 1984 general elections. Reagan appointed her vice-chairwoman of the United States Commission on Civil Rights in 1981, but declined to re-appoint her in 1984. Smith was a social liberal, while the party and the electorate was shifting to the right. In 1991, President George H.W. Bush appointed her to the board of directors of the U.S. Institute of Peace (USIP). Influenced by her husband's experiences as a medic during the Vietnam War, Smith had become active in movements to establish a national peace institute, and she served with USIP until her death.

Smith was active in such organizations as the Republican Mainstream Committee, Iowa Women's Political Caucus, and Planned Parenthood of Greater Iowa. She was a staunch advocate of the Equal Rights Amendment. In 1995, Iowa State University established the Mary Louise Smith Chair in Women and Politics in her honor, and numerous other awards and recognitions are named for her throughout the state.

Smith died of lung cancer in Des Moines at age 82.

Party political offices
Preceded by George H. W. Bush	Chair of the Republican National Committee; 1974–1977	Succeeded by Bill Brock
