= Self-Portrait with Thorn Necklace and Hummingbird =

1940 painting by Frida Kahlo

- Autorretrato con Collar de Espinas y Colibrí (Spanish)
- Artist: Frida Kahlo
- Year: 1940
- Medium: Oil on canvas on masonite
- Dimensions: 61.2 cm × 47 cm (24.11 in × 18.5 in)
- Location: Harry Ransom Center, Austin

Self-Portrait with Thorn Necklace and Hummingbird (Spanish: Autorretrato con Collar de Espinas y Colibrí) is a 1940 self-portrait by Mexican painter Frida Kahlo which also includes a black cat, a monkey, and two dragonflies. It was painted after Kahlo's divorce from Diego Rivera and the end of her affair with photographer Nickolas Muray.

Muray bought the portrait shortly after it was painted, and it is currently part of the Nickolas Muray collection at the Harry Ransom Center at the University of Texas at Austin.

== Background ==
Frida Kahlo was a Mexican painter active between 1925 and 1954. She began painting while bedridden due to a bus accident that left her seriously injured. Most of her work consists of self-portraits, which deal directly with her struggle with medical issues, infertility, and her troubled marriage to Rivera. Painting self-portraits was therapeutic, allowing Kahlo to create a separate Frida on which to project her anguish and pain. Scholars have interpreted her self-portraits as a way for Kahlo to reclaim her body from medical issues and gender conformity. In particular, scholars have interpreted her self-portraits in the context of the tradition of male European artists using the female body as the subject of their paintings and an object of desire. Kahlo, using her own image, reclaims this use from the patriarchal tradition. The autobiographical details of her life found in these works as well as her characteristic brows, elaborate hair, and vibrant Mexican clothing has made her a popular figure in Mexico and the United States.

Kahlo was a big supporter of the Mexican Revolution, so much so that she attempted to change her birth date to correspond with the beginning of the Revolution in 1910. At the onset of this movement, a so-called "cult of Mexican femininity" gained popularity, which Jolie Olcott describes as "selflessness, martyrdom, self-sacrifice, an erasure of self and the negation of one’s outward existence." In rejection of this limited conception of femininity, Kahlo fashioned herself as a Mexican counterpart to the flappers of the United States and Europe in the 1920s. Later, inspired by Rivera's concept of Mexicanidad, a passionate identification with Mexican pre-Hispanic indigenous roots, she donned the identity of the Tehuana woman. The Tehuana had a great deal of equality with their male Zapotec counterparts and represented strength, sensuality, and exoticism.

== Visual analysis ==
This rather small painting (approximately 24 by 18 inches (61 cm × 46 cm)) shows Kahlo in a frontal position and directly confronting the viewer's gaze from the canvas with leaves behind her in the background. Her bold eyebrows hold the emphasis on her face, as a thorn necklace strangles her throat, trailing down her chest like the roots of a tree. A small black hummingbird, which appears to be dead and stiff, hangs with its wings outstretched like a pendant from her throat. She is surrounded by insects and animals, setting the scene of a lush, but suffocatingly dense jungle. A spider monkey sits behind her right shoulder, its eyes focused on its hands, playing with the thorn necklace. Above her head, two dragonflies float in mid-air, above two butterfly clips nesting in the elaborate hairstyle that crowns her head. A black cat with striking ice blue eyes peers up from the foliage over her left shoulder.

== Symbolism ==
Kahlo's identification with indigenous Mexican culture affected her painting aesthetic. By using powerful iconography from indigenous Mexican culture, Kahlo situates herself in a tradition of rebellion against colonial forces and male rule. The dead hummingbird which hangs around her neck is considered a good luck charm for falling in love in Mexican folklore. An alternative interpretation is that the hummingbird pendant is a symbol of Huitzilopochtli, the Aztec god of war. Meanwhile, the cat is symbolic of bad luck and death and the monkey is a symbol of evil. The natural landscape, which normally symbolizes fertility, contrasts with the deathly imagery in the foreground. Rivera gave Kahlo a spider monkey as a gift, thus suggesting that it could be a symbol of Rivera, especially since he inflicts pain upon Kahlo by tugging the thorn necklace hard enough to make her bleed. Alternatively, the thorn necklace could allude to Christ's crown of thorns, thus likening herself to a Christian martyr, and representing the pain and anguish she felt after her failed romantic relationships. In line with this interpretation, the butterflies and dragonflies could symbolize her resurrection.

== Exhibition history ==
The University of Texas at Austin acquired the painting in 1966. Since 1990, it has appeared in several exhibitions internationally:

- "Fer", Philadelphia Museum of Art, February 20, 2008 - May 18, 2008
- Harry Ransom Center, University of Texas at Austin, May 5, 2009 - March 21, 2010
- "In Wonderland: The Surrealist Activities of Women Artists in Mexico and the United States", Los Angeles County Museum of Art, January 29, 2012 – May 6, 2012; Musée national des beaux-arts du Québec, Quebec City, June 7, 2012 - September 3, 2012; Museo de Arte Moderno, Mexico City, September 27, 2012 - Jan. 13, 2013.
- "Frida Kahlo", Scuderie del Quirinale, Rome, March 20, 2014 - August 31, 2014
- Harry Ransom Center, University of Texas at Austin, September 5, 2014 - April 26, 2015
- "Frida: Art, Garden, Life", New York Botanical Garden, May 16, 2015 - November 1, 2015.
- "Frida Kahlo and Arte Popular", Museum of Fine Arts, Boston, February 27, 2019 - June 19, 2019.

== See also ==
- Self-portraiture
- List of paintings by Frida Kahlo
