= Alejandro Gómez Arias =

Mexican lawyer, journalist, essayist and student leader (1906–1990)

Portrait of Alejandro Gómez Arias by Frida Kahlo, 1928

Alejandro Gómez Arias (Note: In this Mexican name, the surname is Gómez and the second or maternal family name is Arias.) (1906–1990) was a Mexican lawyer, journalist, essayist, teacher, political commentator and orator. He was one of the leaders of the 1929 student movement that resulted in the autonomy of the National University of Mexico, serving as president of its strike committee and of the Confederación Nacional de Estudiantes. He subsequently pursued a career in journalism and teaching, edited the literary magazine Fábula. Hojas de México, and became the founding director of Radio Universidad in 1937. He was also involved in the founding of the Partido Popular in 1948 and was associated with the creation of El Colegio Nacional. In 1979 the National University awarded him an honorary doctorate in recognition of his contribution to Mexican public and intellectual life.

He is probably best known in the Anglosphere as being the first boyfriend of the artist Frida Kahlo, and was present when she was injured in a serious traffic accident while they were both students.

== Biography ==
=== Early life ===
Gómez Arias was born in 1906. (Note: Some sources give his birth date as 3 April 1903. Sources differ on whether his birthplace was Oaxaca de Juárez or Mexico City. In a 1989 interview with the news magazine Proceso, Gómez Arias stated that he was born in Oaxaca.) He attended the Escuela Nacional Preparatoria (English: National Preparatory School): there he was a member of the student group the "Cachuchas", with whom he engaged in student journalism. The group brought together students interested in literature, politics and social questions; its members subsequently pursued careers in law, medicine, literature, politics and the arts, and many of them became leading figures of the Mexican intellectual elite. They were rebellious, opposed to everything conservative, and performed pranks, staged plays, and debated philosophy and Russian classics.

=== Relationship with Frida Kahlo ===
At the Escuela Nacional Preparatoria he met Frida Kahlo, and became her first boyfriend, although her parents did not approve of their relationship. Gómez Arias and Kahlo were often separated from each other, due to the political instability and violence of the period, and exchanged passionate love letters. He was with Kahlo in September 1925, when the bus in which they were travelling was struck by an electric streetcar and Kahlo sustained serious injuries. She was impaled by an iron handrail, which was removed by Gómez Arias and others.

=== University ===
Gómez Arias travelled to Europe, and upon his return, he studied law at the University of Mexico. In 1928, he won an oratory contest sponsored by the newspaper El Universal.

Gómez Arias became prominent nationally during the student movement of 1929. The immediate dispute concerned reforms at the Escuela Nacional de Jurisprudencia (English: National School of Jurisprudence), particularly the introduction of additional examinations and attendance requirements, but the conflict developed into a wider movement concerning the relationship between the university and the Mexican state. The student movement advocated for university autonomy.

On 9 May 1929 students voted to strike, and a strike committee was established the following day with Gómez Arias as its president and Ricardo García Villalobos as secretary. The committee sought support from other university schools and pressed the university authorities to address the students' demands.

Gómez Arias also served as president of the Confederación Nacional de Estudiantes (English: National Confederation of Students). During the 1929 confrontation he became one of the principal public spokespersons for the student movement. On 23 May he sent a letter to the authorities describing the violence that had accompanied the conflict and arguing that the students wanted the university's life to be organised according to its own rules, rather than by the government. He rejected the government's accusation that the strike was primarily political, and presented university self-government as the central issue.

President of Mexico Emilio Portes Gil ultimately accepted the principle of university autonomy. On 10 July 1929 he promulgated the new Organic Law of the University, establishing it as an autonomous institution named the Universidad Nacional Autónoma de México (English: National Autonomous University of Mexico) or UNAM. The Instituto Nacional de Estudios Históricos de las Revoluciones de México (English: National Institute of Historical Studies of the Revolutions of Mexico) later described Gómez Arias as one of the principal figures associated with the movement that produced the university's autonomy.

=== Radio UNAM ===
One of Gómez Arias's most enduring institutional contributions was his role in the establishment of university broadcasting. The project for a university radio service developed in the 1930s, and he became its founding director. On 14 June 1937 Radio UNAM began broadcasting under the name "Radio Universidad Nacional Autónoma de México", the original station transmitting on medium wave and initially broadcasting for four hours a day.

In his inaugural address, he presented the radio service as an instrument for extending the University's educational and cultural work beyond Mexico City. He envisaged broadcasts that would disseminate scientific and cultural material and make the University's intellectual resources available to audiences throughout Mexico and abroad. He also argued that the station should provide a forum for different political and social viewpoints rather than serve as a vehicle for a single ideology. The station's sound archive, the "Fonoteca Alejandro Gómez Arias", now bears his name; it was formally established in 1987, and contains recordings documenting the history of Radio UNAM and Mexican cultural and intellectual life.

=== Teaching, journalism and Fábula ===
Gómez Arias combined his legal training with teaching and journalism. He taught literature and history and later worked in university and cultural education. He also became involved in editorial work and political commentary.

In 1934 he and the writer Miguel N. Lira directed the literary magazine Fábula. Hojas de México (English: Fable. Leaves of Mexico). The magazine appeared monthly from January to September 1934 and published nine issues. It was deliberately open to writers from different generations and literary tendencies rather than functioning as the organ of a single literary school. Gómez Arias was primarily responsible for the editorial side of the publication, seeking contributors and correcting their manuscripts, while Lira handled much of the printing and typography. The magazine published essays, poetry, short fiction, reproductions of artwork and photographs and provided a platform for both established and younger Mexican writers. The magazine's contributors included writers such as Xavier Villaurrutia, Salvador Novo, Alfonso Reyes, Julio Torri and Agustín Yáñez.

Gómez Arias subsequently became a prolific newspaper and magazine writer, his journalism dealing principally with Mexican political and social affairs. In later life he was particularly associated with the magazine Siempre! (English: Always!), to which he contributed political commentary over many years.

=== Political activity ===
Gómez Arias participated in Mexican political movements without making a conventional career as an elected politician. As a young man he supported José Vasconcelos's presidential campaign of 1929 and remained associated with the generation of intellectuals and activists that had emerged from the university movement.

He was subsequently involved in the political and intellectual circles around the labour leader Vicente Lombardo Toledano and politician Narciso Bassols. He was among the founders of the Partido Popular in 1948 and served on its initial leadership. The party was founded under Lombardo Toledano's leadership and advocated, among other objectives, nationalisation, opposition to imperialism, equality between men and women, and popular education.

Gómez Arias was among the promoters of El Colegio Nacional (English: the National College) and delivered the institution's official inaugural address on 15 May 1943, on behalf of the Secretary of Public Education, Octavio Véjar Vázquez, who was representing President Manuel Ávila Camacho. In his address he described the new institution as a means of bringing together leading figures in Mexican science, literature, philosophy and the arts. His speech was subsequently published as Discurso oficial (1943) and has been cited in studies of the intellectual history of El Colegio Nacional.

=== Later career and recognition ===
Gómez Arias continued to write and comment on Mexican public affairs during the second half of the twentieth century. His memoir, Memoria personal de un país, was published in 1990 and records his recollections of the university movement, Mexican political life and the intellectual circles and cultural environment in which he had participated.

In 1977 he received the Premio Nacional de Periodismo 'José Joaquín Fernández de Lizardi', a national prize for journalism awarded by the Club de Periodistas de Mexico.

In 1979, during the commemorations of the fiftieth anniversary of university autonomy, the Universidad Nacional Autónoma de México awarded Gómez Arias an honorary doctorate. He was among sixteen Mexican and foreign intellectuals and academics recognised by the university in connection with the anniversary; other recipients included Claude Lévi-Strauss, Octavio Paz, Rufino Tamayo, Edmundo O'Gorman and Alexander Oparin. His honorary doctorate recognised his connection with the university and, in particular, his role in the movement that established its autonomy.

Gómez Arias lived for many years with Teresa Salazar Mallén, who was commonly described as his wife. According to biographer Martha Zamora, an investigation of the Mexico City civil register found no record that the couple ever legally married. However, an official notarial notice published after Gómez Arias's death described him as Salazar Mallén's late husband.

He died in Mexico City on 3 March 1990.

== Writings ==
Gómez Arias wrote on law, education, university affairs and Mexican intellectual life. His early legal-philosophical thesis Al margen de Kelsen: notas sobre el sentido estético del derecho (On the Margins of Kelsen: Notes on the Aesthetic Sense of Law) was published in Mexico in 1938 by the Facultad de Derecho y Ciencias Sociales of the Universidad Nacional Autónoma de México. The work examined the ideas associated with the Austrian jurist Hans Kelsen. His study Justo Sierra, a biographical study of the writer Justo Sierra, examined Sierra's conception of the university. Other writings by Gómez Arias included articles on the 1929 university movement and university reform, including "Algunas consideraciones sobre la Reforma Universitaria del 29" (English: "Some considerations regarding the University Reform of 1929") in the journal Medio Siglo in 1953.

== Selected publications ==
- Gómez Arias, Alejandro; Lira, Miguel N., eds. (1934). Fábula. Hojas de México [Fable. Leaves of Mexico] (in Spanish).
- Gómez Arias, Alejandro (1936). Justo Sierra. Colección Biografías populares (in Spanish). México: Universidad Nacional Autónoma de México.
- ————— (1938). Al margen de Kelsen: Notas sobre el sentido estetico del derecho [On the Margins of Kelsen: Notes on the Aesthetic Sense of Law] (Bachelor of Law thesis) (in Spanish). Mexico: Facultad de Derecho, UNAM.
- ————— (June 1953). "Algunas consideraciones sobre la Reforma Universitaria del 29" [Some considerations regarding the University Reform of 1929]. Medio Siglo (in Spanish). II (2 (April–May–June)): 25.
- ————— (1984). Imagen y obra escogida [Image and selected work] (in Spanish). México: Universidad Nacional Autónoma de México.
- ————— (1990). Memoria personal de un país [A country's personal memoir] (in Spanish). Grijalbo. ISBN 978-9700500614.
- ————— (1992). Díaz Arciniega, Victor (ed.). De viva voz. Antología [In Person: An Anthology] (in Spanish). México: Universidad Nacional Autónoma de México.
- ————— (1994). ————— (ed.). En el centro de la mira. Antología [In the Crosshairs: An Anthology] (in Spanish). México: Universidad Nacional Autónoma de México.

== Sources ==
- Alonso-Minutti, Ana R. (2023). "The Composer as Intellectual: Mario Lavista and El Colegio Nacional". Mario Lavista: Mirrors of Sounds. Currents in Latin American and Iberian Music. OUP USA. pp. 289–321. ISBN 978-0190212728.
- Ankori, Gannit (2002). Imaging Her Selves: Frida Kahlo's Poetics of Identity and Fragmentation. Greenwood Press. ISBN 978-0-313-31565-7.
- Barson, Tanya (2005). "'All Art is At Once Surface and Symbol': A Frida Kahlo Glossary". In Dexter, Emma (ed.). Frida Kahlo. Tate Modern. ISBN 1-85437-586-5.
- Burrus, Christina (2005). "The Life of Frida Kahlo". In Dexter, Emma (ed.). Frida Kahlo. Tate Modern. ISBN 1-85437-586-5.
- Flores, Miguel Ángel (11 March 1989). "Un malentendido: Alejandro Gómez Arias no donó parte de su biblioteca a la UAM: esta la adquirió" [A Misunderstanding: Alejandro Gómez Arias Did Not Donate Part of His Library to the UAM; the University Acquired It]. Proceso (in Spanish). Archived from the original on 11 April 2019.
- Garone Gravier, Marina; Treviño Salazar, Elizabeth; Cruz Quintana, Fernando, eds. (2023). Forja de palabras. Historias de la producción editorial en México [Forging Words: Stories of Publishing in Mexico] (in Spanish). Universidad Autónoma de Aguascalientes (UAA). ISBN 978-607-8909-98-8.
- Garza, Eloy (28 January 2021). "Alejandro Gómez Arias: uno de los grandes periodistas hoy olvidado" [Alejandro Gómez Arias: one of the great journalists, now forgotten.]. SDP Noticias (in Spanish).
- González, Zurisaddai (13 January 2024). "Qué fue de Alejandro Gómez Arias, el novio de Frida Kahlo que iba en el tranvía durante el accidente y la abandonó" [What happened to Alejandro Gómez Arias, Frida Kahlo's boyfriend who was on the streetcar during the accident and abandoned her?]. Infobae (in Spanish).
- González Calderón, Carlos Hugo (July 2006). "Alejandro Gómez Arias: la batalla por la dignidad" [Alejandro Gómez Arias: The Battle for Dignity]. Proyecto Ensayo Hispánico (in Spanish).
- Heliodoro Valle, Rafael (May–June 1939). "Documentos de la Sociología en Hispanoamérica (1938–1939)" [Documents on Sociology in Spanish America (1938–1939)]. Revista Mexicana de Sociología (in Spanish). 1 (2). Universidad Nacional Autónoma de México (UNAM): 169–176.
- Herrera, Hayden (2002). Frida: A Biography of Frida Kahlo. Harper Perennial. ISBN 9780060085896.
- Herrera Santillán, Donovan (November 2025). "Fábula. Hojas de México" [Fable. Leaves of Mexico]. Revista de la Universidad de México (in Spanish).
- Ibarra Ferrer, Santiago; Varela Ruiz, Margarita (2017). "La memoria sonora de Radio UNAM: un referente de investigación y educación" [The audio archive of Radio UNAM: a benchmark for research and education]. Revista Digital Universitaria (in Spanish). Vol. 18, no. 5.
- Kettenmann, Andrea (2003). Kahlo. Taschen. pp. 17–18. ISBN 978-3-8228-5983-4.
- Maranzani, Barbara (17 June 2020). "How a Horrific Bus Accident Changed Frida Kahlo's Life". Biography. Archived from the original on 22 April 2022.
- Marsiske, Renate (October–December 1982). "El movimiento estudiantil de 1929 y la autonomía de la Universidad Nacional de México" [The 1929 Student Movement and the Autonomy of the National University of Mexico] (PDF). Revista de la Educación Superior (in Spanish). Asociación Nacional de Universidades e Instituciones de Educación Superior (ANUIES). pp. 5–30.
- Radio UNAM (1937). "Historia" [History]. Radio UNAM (in Spanish).
- Radio UNAM (3 April 2016). "80 años de Radio UNAM" [80 Years of Radio UNAM]. Radio UNAM (in Spanish).
- Soberón, Guillermo (2015). "Documentos de la autonomía universitaria: Encumbramiento de Autononomia Universitaria a un Nivel Constitucional" [Documents on University Autonomy: Elevating University Autonomy to a Constitutional Level] (PDF). Academia Nacional de Medicina de México (in Spanish). p. 14.
- Universidad Nacional Autónoma de México (UNAM) (2019). "La autonomía, cada vez más cercana" [Autonomy, ever closer]. Gaceta UNAM (in Spanish).
- Woods, Richard D. (1994). "Mexican Autobiography: An Essay and Annotated Bibliography". Biblioteca Virtual Miguel de Cervantes. Trinity University.
- Zamora, Martha (2015). En Busca de Frida [In Search of Frida] (in Spanish). ISBN 978-6079084028.
