= Steffen Thomas =

German painter

- Born: Steffen Wolfgang George Thomas; January 7, 1906; Fürth, Germany
- Died: January 27, 1990 (aged 84); Atlanta, Georgia
- Education: School of Applied Arts, Nuremberg; Academy of Fine Arts, Munich
- Known for: painting, sculpture, mosaic, watercolor, drawing, printmaking
- Movement: Expressionism
- Website: http://www.steffenthomas.org

Steffen Wolfgang George Thomas (January 7, 1906 – January 27, 1990) was an artist and poet. He was born in Fürth, Germany, but lived most of his adult life in Atlanta, Georgia. His most notable pieces are public monuments; however, he also worked in other media (including, but not limited to painting, sculpture, mosaic, printmaking, encaustic, and watercolor). His art is greatly influenced by Expressionism.

== History and background ==
Thomas was born in 1906 in Fürth, Germany. He expressed a strong passion for art from an early age. After Thomas's father witnessed his son carving angel faces in the marble foundation of their home, he later apprenticed Thomas to a stone carver, providing Thomas a useful skill, but also a creative outlet to cultivate his artistic talents.

Following his apprenticeship, Thomas was accepted to the School of Applied Arts, Nuremberg, and then to the Academy of Fine Arts, Munich. His focus was drawing and sculpture based on the classical model. Thomas achieved “Master” status at age twenty-one and was given his own studio.

Thomas quickly tired of his artistic life in Germany and longed for greater endeavors. In 1928, Thomas realized his dream of moving to America. He spent brief periods in Florida, Illinois, and Alabama, but eventually settled in Atlanta, Georgia, in 1930. In 1931 Thomas created a bust of journalist Henry W. Grady which became the central display of the Georgia Newspaper Hall of Fame.

A few houses down from Thomas lived a school teacher named Sara Douglass. Thomas was introduced to Douglass through her mother over a conversation about gardening, and after a two-month courtship they were married (1933) at Fulton County Courthouse. Thomas briefly returned to Germany after his move to America, but did not visit again until 1972. While his family remained in Germany, Thomas found his artistic life belonged in his adoptive country and he became an American citizen in 1935.

In 1941, Sara and Steffen purchased fifty acres near Stone Mountain, Georgia, and subsequently built a home and artist studio. The couple raised four children, Steffen, Robin, Douglass, and Lisa. Thomas continually worked on the complex by hand, and it became a popular destination, visited by friends, family, and tourists.

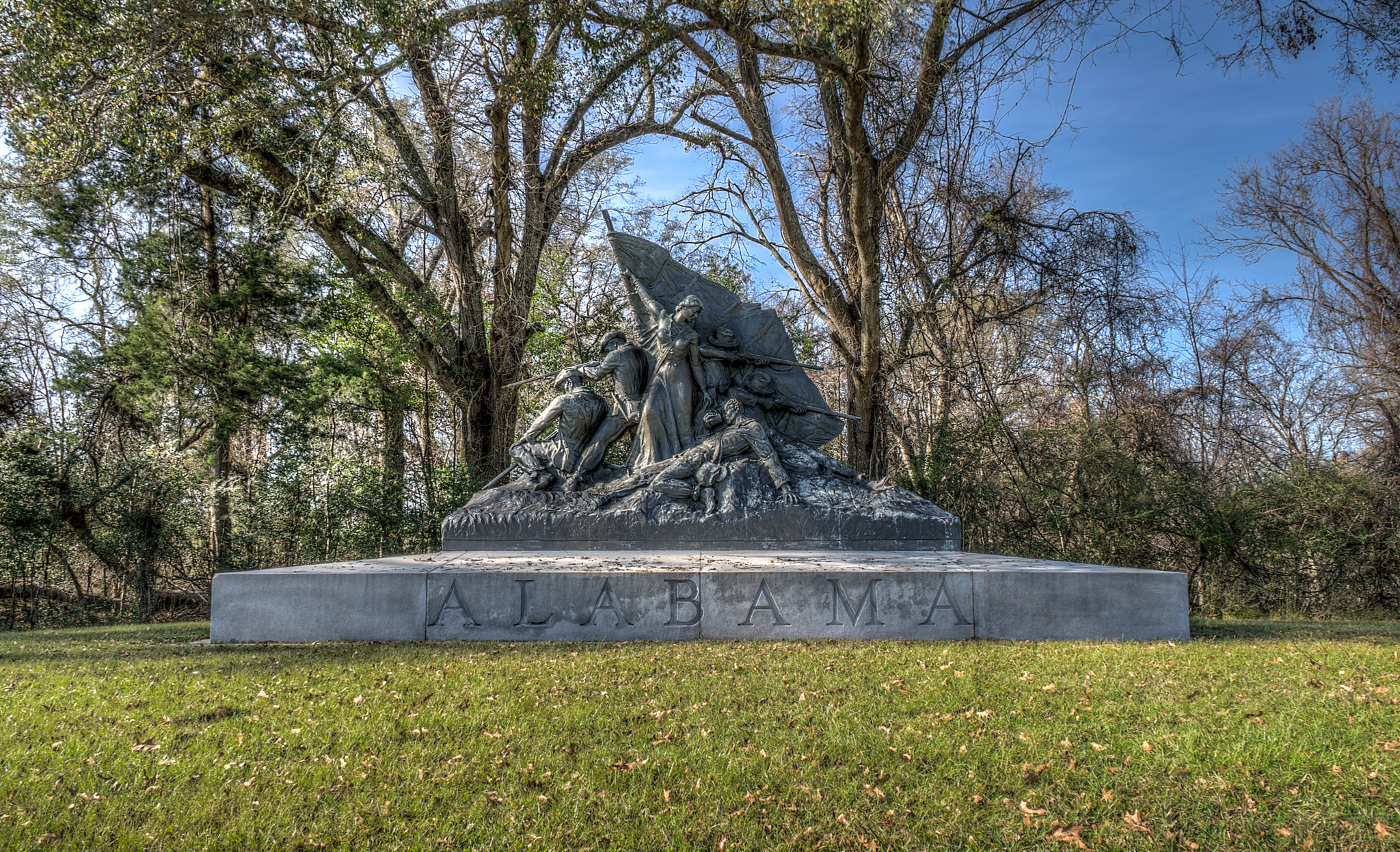
Alabama Memorial at the Vicksburg National Military Park

Thomas supported his family through public commissions and portraiture. Among the most notable monuments are the Alabama Memorial (1951) installed at the Vicksburg National Military Park, the statue of Eugene Talmadge, Georgia State Capitol Collection, and the Trilon (c.1950) located on the corner of Peachtree and 15th Street in Atlanta. Thomas also created numerous busts commemorating prominent Georgians: Chief Justice Richard Russell Jr., Georgia State College for Women (currently Georgia College and State University), Milledgeville, GA; Martha Berry, Berry Schools (currently Berry College), Berry, GA; Joel Chandler Harris, Atlanta Public Schools; Moina Michael, “The Poppy Lady”, Georgia State Capitol, Atlanta, GA; portrait head of Franklin D. Roosevelt, Little White House, Warm Springs, GA; and George Washington Carver, Tuskegee Institute (currently Tuskegee University), Tuskegee, AL.

Thomas found acclaimed success with public works; however, with the refusal of his proposal for the Stone Mountain Civil War Memorial (a twenty-year plan in the making), he became disenchanted with seeking public commissions, and naturally turned his focus toward creating works to express his personal artistic ideals. Essentially, he was free to create art without the restraints often associated with commissioned projects.

From his days at the academy, Thomas did not take criticism well. He lost a Palm Beach commission when he substituted his own imagery in place of the Gothic specifications of the patron. He was notoriously hypersensitive to gallery owners, collectors, and patrons that did not appreciate his art. Thomas had a distinct artistic vision that was difficult to change once he set his mind to creating. Art Historian Anthony Janson comments on Thomas's attitude toward his art, “What better way to shield one’s work (and oneself) from criticism that to avoid the confrontation altogether by keeping all but true believers from seeing it?”

In 1970, Thomas returned to a midtown Atlanta studio, selling his Stone Mountain estate. He continued his work until his death with the same passion and intensity from his student days.

== Artistic relevance ==
Thomas was formally trained in sculpture, drawing, and the classical arts at the Academy of Fine Arts, Munich. While in Germany, his art wholly reflected the classical tradition; however, by the time he settled in Atlanta, his aesthetic made a change toward the abstract. From his student days he was largely influenced by other artistic movements, but especially by Expressionism and post-Cubism. He also experimented with materials and worked with every available medium, a technique he continued throughout his career. Creativity was first and foremost the driving factor for Thomas.

Pamina, (1955), Steffen Thomas Museum of Art, permanent collection

Thomas admitted that as a young man he did not understand the importance of the Expressionists’ vision, but later in life he fully recognized the influence of the movement on his own work.

Thomas came to the United States in search of the Romantic ideal of prosperity and freedom. Once he arrived, he took advantage of every opportunity available. He served as Arts Supervisor for the National Youth Administration (WPA program), from 1939 to 1941, served as a representative of the Georgia Artists Association with the Georgia Art Commission, and on the advisory board of UNICEF.

Thomas had an affinity for representing the female form in his art. Dorothy Joiner notes the “preponderance of female subjects [in Thomas’s art]: goddesses, nudes, mothers, contemporary celebrities…famous women from literature, unidentified girls.”

Thomas was enraptured by the feminine form from his earliest artistic period. As a student, Thomas was asked to create the highest form of labor, in which he responded by creating a mother and child figure, calling it Laboré (1927–28). Laboré represents Thomas's respect and admiration for motherhood and the relationship between a mother and child. This theme reoccurs throughout Thomas's artistic career. Art historian Anthony Janson terms the women figures in Thomas's oeuvre as muses. They tend to resemble his wife, Sara, although the muses appear in works prior to their introduction. The feminine figures are likened to the classical tradition but are not specifically based on classical notions. They are classically inspired, but stylistically modern. For Thomas, the muses represent femininity, but also humanity.

Thomas also explored subjects such as philosophy, religion, literature, and mythology. While he was largely influenced by his early training and the Expressionist movement, his work was often dictated by subjects he found intriguing. He believed that art must transcend time and culture; therefore, he simplified and abstracted his own works to universally translate to the viewer. While his work is sometimes difficult to interpret literally, he often includes symbols or imagery portraying universally understood emotions.

Due to Thomas's use of symbol and abstraction, Alan Aiches places him stylistically and philosophically between the movements of Die Brücke and Der Blaue Reiter, two generations of German art.

While Thomas is not directly aligned with a specific German or American movement of art, he is considered to be an Expressionist. However, he was influenced by art from many periods dating back to antiquity. He was not characteristically German Expressionist, although, the genre greatly influenced his creations. Aiches writes the following: “When viewing and contemplating the works of the early twentieth century German Expressionists, I feel the same intense and simultaneous infusion of philosophy and craft that is so apparent in Thomas’ sculpture and painting.”

Thomas worked in various media: watercolor, sculpture, encaustic, welded copper, mosaic, and drawing to name a few, but he also repeatedly created frames for his pieces. The carvings incorporated mosaics and mixed media, and often were recycled from discarded objects. The desire to make frames correlated with Thomas’s need to experiment and manipulate materials. He also added natural elements such as sand to his works to create dimension and depth.

Janson describes Thomas’s style: “There is a consistent artist personality at work, even though his output is extremely varied. It shows an endless fascination with the possibilities to be explored in different media, whose techniques he set out to master with real virtuosity. This was, by all accounts, a counterpart to his innate curiosity. More generally, it was tied to the unfolding of his imagination, which took place in the peace of self-imposed isolation.”

Thomas continued to create art well into the last years of his life, although, his sight and health were failing. However, in his final years, Thomas returned to central themes found throughout his oeuvre indicating his lifelong fervor for the creative.

Thomas's art has achieved numerous awards and honors throughout the state of Georgia, such as Atlanta Beautiful Commission, Award for Excellence from the Atlanta Urban Design Commission, and the Governor's Award in the Arts. His art can be found in the collections at the High Museum of Art, Atlanta; the Georgia Museum of Art, Athens; the Georgia Capitol Museum, Atlanta; the Museum of Arts and Sciences, Macon; and Lamar Dodd Center, Lagrange.

== Steffen Thomas Museum of Art ==
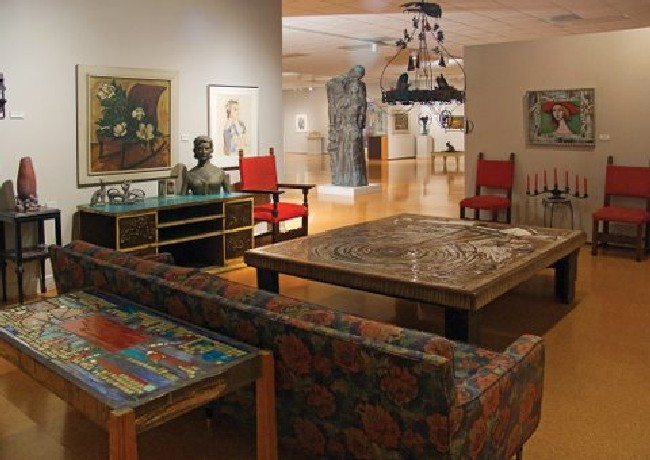
Interior of Steffen Thomas Museum of Art (2011)

Thomas’s wife and lifelong muse, Sara, conceived the idea to create a museum dedicated to the memory of her husband and his art. She founded the Steffen Thomas Museum and Archives (Steffen Thomas Museum of Art) in Buckhead in 1997. The museum houses an extensive collection of Thomas’s art and is dedicated to the research and documentation of his life’s work. The Steffen Thomas Museum of Art is one of the few organizations in the country dedicated to one artist.

The Steffen Thomas Museum of Art’s mission is “dedicated to providing art education programs and projects for children and families in rural Northeast and Middle Georgia communities. Using Georgia artist Steffen Thomas's work as examples of creative expression the museum provides opportunities for children to develop their own talents, a deeper understanding of themselves, of their connections to all living things and of their responsibility for preserving the environment.”

Elizabeth d’Huart, previous Director of the Steffen Thomas Museum of Art, writes of the artist: “Thomas’s early work is classical in style, particularly his sculptures in cast bronze, reflecting his rigorous European training. As the years passed, his style evolved, becoming looser and more interpretive, moving from realistic to expressionist exuberance. His mosaics and watercolors convey his passion for light and color, and his sculptures provide excellent examples of captured and arrested motion…His interest in politics, philosophy, and religion are evidenced by themes and motifs that are represented and repeated in a multiplicity of genres and mediums.”
