= The Two Fridas =

1939 painting by Frida Kahlo

- Las dos Fridas (Spanish)
- Artist: Frida Kahlo
- Year: 1939
- Medium: Oil on canvas
- Movement: Naïve art; Surrealism
- Dimensions: 173.5 cm × 173 cm (68.3 in × 68 in)
- Location: Museo de Arte Moderno, Mexico City

The Two Fridas (Las dos Fridas in Spanish) is an oil painting by Mexican artist Frida Kahlo. The painting was the first large-scale work done by Kahlo and is considered one of her most notable paintings. It is a double self-portrait, depicting two versions of Kahlo seated together. One is wearing a white European style Victorian dress, while the other is wearing a traditional Tehuana dress. The painting is housed at the Museo de Arte Moderno in Mexico City.

== History ==
Kahlo painted The Two Fridas in 1939, the same year she divorced artist Diego Rivera, although they remarried a year later. According to Kahlo's friend, Fernando Gamboa, the painting was inspired by two paintings that Kahlo saw earlier that year at the Louvre: Théodore Chassériau's The Two Sisters and the anonymous Gabrielle d'Estrées and One of Her Sisters.

In January 1940, The Two Fridas was exhibited along with The Wounded Table at the International Surrealist Exhibition in Mexico City.

The painting remained in Kahlo's possession until it was acquired by the Instituto Nacional de Bellas Artes (INBA) in 1947. The INBA transferred it to the Museo de Arte Moderno on December 28, 1966, where it is presently housed.

== Subject ==
Some art historians have suggested that the two figures in the painting represent Frida's dual heritage. Her father, Guillermo Kahlo, was German; while her mother, Matilde Calderon, was Mexican. Another interpretation is that the Tehuana Frida is the one who was adored by her husband Diego Rivera, while the European Frida is the one that was rejected by him. In Frida's own recollection, the image is of a memory of a childhood imaginary friend.

Both Fridas hold items in their respective laps; the Mexican Frida holds a miniature portrait of her husband Diego Rivera, while the European Frida holds forceps. Blood spills onto the European Frida's white dress from a broken blood vessel that the forceps have cut. The blood vessel connects the two Fridas, winding its way from their hands through their hearts. The work alludes to Kahlo's life of constant pain and surgical procedures and the Aztec tradition of human sacrifice. Because this piece was completed by Kahlo shortly after her divorce, the European Frida is missing a piece of herself, her Diego.

Each Frida shows an open heart. The heart of the Mexican Frida is healthy, whereas the heart of the European Frida is open and cut. One interpretation of this is that it not only shows two separate personalities but indicates the constant pain that Frida is going through. The tragic motor accident that left her bedridden and then with medical problems throughout her life is shown through the two figures; one is weak while the other is strong. Although the two figures appear separate, a vein connecting them further symbolises that despite the differences in the two figures they both make up one Frida; together they make the self-portrait.

== Impact ==
Hispanic studies professor Sarah M. Misemer suggests that Kahlo's multi-racial representation seen in The Two Fridas reflects the impact that the colonial era had on racial demographics in Mexico. Additionally, Misemer argues that Kahlo's representation of herself as a multi-racial individual serves as a cultural symbol for the Mexican nation.

Kahlo's work has inspired the creation of cultural products. For example, the painting The Two Fridas inspired a play called Las Dos Fridas (1998) by Bárbara Córcega, María del Carmen Farías, and Abraham Oceransky. In this play, two separate actresses play different versions of Kahlo named Espina (Thorn) and Flor (Flower). Although these characters have different names, they are supposed to be the same person. Espina wears a Tehuana outfit, like the indigenous representation of Kahlo seen in the painting, whereas Flor wears a suit from the 1940s. In the original play, Espina and Flor were played by two of its writers, Córcega and Farías.

The play begins with Flor asking Espina about Kahlo's identity. Espina then explains different aspects of Kahlo's identity, such as her gender and career. Historians argue that these various understandings of Kahlo's identity, which Espina and Flor carry, suggest the multi-faceted nature of Kahlo's own identity. This multifaceted nature of her identity is expanded through the set of the play; a sketch of a self-portrait of Kahlo is a prop on the stage. The play then moves to the two versions of Kahlo acting out various scenes from her own life, with an emphasis on her struggles in her marriage with Rivera, who had numerous affairs with other women during their marriage. Specifically, the play addresses the shame Kahlo feels and her denial regarding Rivera's affairs. The play also highlights how Kahlo used her physical pain to manipulate Rivera into staying with her. Misemer's studies suggest that Kahlo's medical conditions and pain prevented Rivera from ending their relationship.

== See also ==
- Self-portraiture
- List of paintings by Frida Kahlo
