= Self-Portrait with Monkey =

Painting by Frida Kahlo

- Autorretrato con mono (Spanish)
- Artist: Frida Kahlo
- Year: 1938
- Type: Oil on masonite
- Dimensions: 40.6 cm × 30.5 cm (16.0 in × 12.0 in)
- Location: Albright–Knox Art Gallery, Buffalo, New York

Self-Portrait with Monkey (Autorretrato con mono in Spanish) is an oil on masonite painting by Mexican artist Frida Kahlo, commissioned in 1938 by A. Conger Goodyear, then president of the Museum of Modern Art in New York City. It is one of the many self-portraits painted by Kahlo for friends and patrons during her career.

The commission came after Goodyear attended Kahlo's first solo exhibition in November 1938 at the Julien Levy Gallery in New York. There, Goodyear admired Kahlo's 1937 painting Fulang-Chang and I, which depicted Kahlo with her pet monkey, but Kahlo had already promised this painting to her friend Mary Schapiro Sklar.

The original is housed at the Buffalo AKG Art Museum formerly the Albright–Knox Art Gallery in Buffalo, New York.

== See also ==
- Self-portraiture
- List of paintings by Frida Kahlo
