= List of accolades received by Frida =

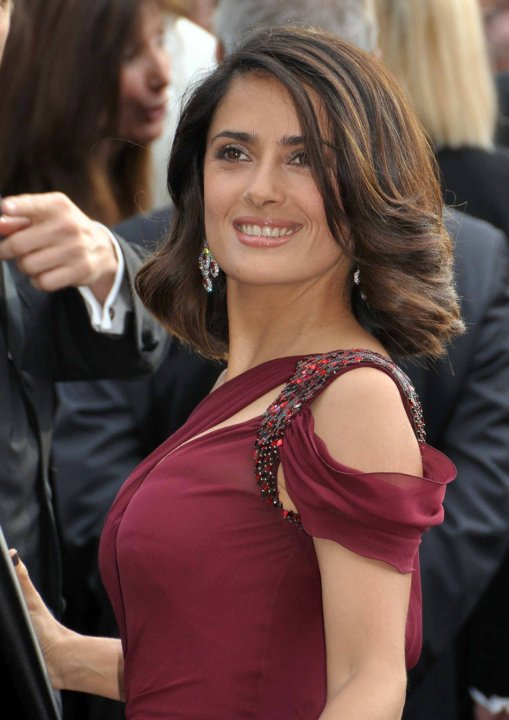
- Actress Salma Hayek received multiple award nominations for her portrayal of Frida Kahlo.
Awards & nominations
Award	Won	Nominated
Academy Award	2	6
American Film Institute Awards	1	1
American Society of Cinematographers	0	1
Bangkok International Film Festival	0	1
British Academy Film Awards	1	4
Broadcast Film Critics Association	0	2
Chicago Film Critics Association	0	2
Chicago International Film Festival	0	1
Costume Designers Guild	0	1
Dallas-Fort Worth Film Critics Association	0	1
GLAAD Media Awards	0	1
Goldene Kamera	1	1
Golden Globe Award	1	2
Make-Up Artists and Hair Stylists Guild	0	4
Imagen Awards	4	4
National Board of Review Awards	1	1
Satellite Award	2	5
Screen Actors Guild Award	0	2
Venice Film Festival	1	2
Visual Effects Society	0	1
World Soundtrack Awards	2	3
- Total number of wins and nominations
Totals	16	46
- References

Frida is a 2002 biographical film about Mexican painter Frida Kahlo, directed by Julie Taymor. It was adapted from Hayden Herrera's 1983 Frida: A Biography of Frida Kahlo by Clancy Sigal, Diane Lake, Gregory Nava and Anna Thomas. Actress Salma Hayek was cast as Kahlo, while Alfred Molina portrays her husband Diego Rivera. The film premiered at the Venice Film Festival on August 29, 2002, where it competed for the Golden Lion. Frida then went on to play at the Toronto International Film Festival and the Chicago International Film Festivals. The film received a limited release in the United States from October 25, 2002. As of October 2012, Frida has earned over $56 million in its total worldwide gross at the box office.

Frida garnered various awards and nominations following its release, with most of the nominations recognising Hayek and Molina's performances, composer Elliot Goldenthal's score and the hair and makeup teams. The film received six nominations from the 75th Academy Awards and came away with two awards for Best Makeup and Best Original Score respectively. The American Film Institute placed Frida on their Top Ten Movies of the Year list, as did the National Board of Review of Motion Pictures. The film received four nominations from the British Academy Film Awards and Judy Chin, Beatrice DeAlba, John E. Jackson and Regina Reyes went on to win the BAFTA Award for Best Makeup and Hair.

For their performances as Kahlo and Rivera, Hayek and Molina were nominated for Best Actress and Best Supporting Actor at the British Academy Film Awards, Broadcast Film Critics Association, Chicago Film Critics Association and the Screen Actors Guild Awards. At the Imagen Awards, Hayek and Molina won Best Actress and Best Actor respectively, while the film won Best Drama Picture. Hayek was also nominated for Best Actress at the 60th Golden Globe Awards and named Best International Actress by the Goldene Kamera. Goldenthal gathered a total of five awards for his score, including a Golden Globe, Satellite Award and the World Soundtrack Award for Best Original Score of the Year. "Burn It Blue", an original song written by Goldenthal and Taymor for the film, earned two award nominations.

Frida's hair stylists and makeup artists earned four nominations at Make-Up Artists and Hair Stylists Guild, but came away empty handed. Costume designer Julie Weiss won a Satellite Award for Best Costume Design, before going on to garner a nomination from the Costume Designers Guild. Jeremy Dawson and Daniel Schrecker received a nomination for Best Supporting Visual Effects in a Motion Picture from the Visual Effects Society.

== Awards and nominations ==
Award	Date of ceremony	Category	Recipients and nominees	Result
Academy Awards	March 23, 2003	Best Actress	Salma Hayek	Nominated
Academy Awards	March 23, 2003	Best Production Design	Felipe Fernández del Paso & Hania Robledo	Nominated
Academy Awards	March 23, 2003	Best Costume Design	Julie Weiss	Nominated
Academy Awards	March 23, 2003	Best Makeup	John E. Jackson & Beatrice De Alba	Won
Academy Awards	March 23, 2003	Best Original Score	Elliot Goldenthal	Won
Academy Awards	March 23, 2003	Best Original Song	"Burn It Blue" – Elliot Goldenthal and Julie Taymor	Nominated
American Film Institute Awards	December 16, 2002	Top Ten Movies of the Year	Frida	Won
American Society of Cinematographers	February 16, 2003	Outstanding Achievement in Cinematography	Rodrigo Prieto	Nominated
Bangkok International Film Festival	January 21, 2003	Golden Kinnaree Award	Frida	Nominated
British Academy Film Awards	February 23, 2003	Best Actress	Salma Hayek	Nominated
British Academy Film Awards	February 23, 2003	Best Costume Design	Julie Weiss	Nominated
British Academy Film Awards	February 23, 2003	Best Makeup and Hair	Judy Chin, Beatriz De Alba, John E. Jackson, Regina Reyes	Won
British Academy Film Awards	February 23, 2003	Best Supporting Actor	Alfred Molina	Nominated
Broadcast Film Critics Association	January 17, 2003	Best Actress	Salma Hayek	Nominated
Broadcast Film Critics Association	January 17, 2003	Best Supporting Actor	Alfred Molina	Nominated
Chicago Film Critics Association	January 8, 2003	Best Actress	Salma Hayek	Nominated
Chicago Film Critics Association	January 8, 2003	Best Supporting Actor	Alfred Molina	Nominated
Chicago International Film Festival	October 18, 2002	Best Feature	Frida	Nominated
Costume Designers Guild	March 16, 2003	Excellence in Period/Fantasy Film	Julie Weiss	Nominated
Dallas-Fort Worth Film Critics Association	January 6, 2003	Best Actress	Salma Hayek	Nominated
GLAAD Media Awards	May 31, 2003	Outstanding Wide Release Film	Frida	Nominated
Goldene Kamera	February 4, 2003	Best International Actress	Salma Hayek	Won
Golden Globe Awards	January 19, 2003	Best Actress	Salma Hayek	Nominated
Golden Globe Awards	January 19, 2003	Best Original Score	Elliot Goldenthal	Won
Make-Up Artists and Hair Stylists Guild	February 16, 2003	Best Character Hair Styling	Beatrice De Alba	Nominated
Make-Up Artists and Hair Stylists Guild	February 16, 2003	Best Period Hair Styling	Beatrice De Alba	Nominated
Make-Up Artists and Hair Stylists Guild	February 16, 2003	Best Period Makeup	Judy Chin, Maryann Marchetti, John E. Jackson	Nominated
Make-Up Artists and Hair Stylists Guild	February 16, 2003	Best Special Makeup Effects	Matthew W. Mungle, Judy Chin, John E. Jackson	Nominated
Imagen Awards	May 29, 2003	Best Actor	Alfred Molina	Won
Imagen Awards	May 29, 2003	Best Actress	Salma Hayek	Won
Imagen Awards	May 29, 2003	Best Drama Picture	Frida	Won
Imagen Awards	May 29, 2003	Creative Achievement	Salma Hayek	Won
National Board of Review Awards	December 4, 2002	Top 10 Films	Frida	Won
Satellite Awards	January 12, 2003	Best Actress	Salma Hayek	Nominated
Satellite Awards	January 12, 2003	Best Art Direction	Felipe Fernández del Paso and Hania Robledo	Nominated
Satellite Awards	January 12, 2003	Best Costume Design	Julie Weiss	Won
Satellite Awards	January 12, 2003	Best Original Score	Elliot Goldenthal	Won
Satellite Awards	January 12, 2003	Best Supporting Actor	Alfred Molina	Nominated
Screen Actors Guild Awards	March 9, 2003	Outstanding Performance by a Female Actor in a Leading Role	Salma Hayek	Nominated
Screen Actors Guild Awards	March 9, 2003	Outstanding Performance by a Male Actor in a Supporting Role	Alfred Molina	Nominated
Venice Film Festival	September 6, 2002	Golden Lion	Frida	Nominated
Venice Film Festival	September 6, 2002	Mimmo Rotella Foundation Award	Julie Taymor	Won
Visual Effects Society	February 19, 2003	Best Supporting Visual Effects in a Motion Picture	Jeremy Dawson and Daniel Schrecker	Nominated
World Soundtrack Awards	October 11, 2003	Best Original Score of the Year	Elliot Goldenthal	Won
World Soundtrack Awards	October 11, 2003	Best Original Song Written for a Film	"Burn It Blue" – Elliot Goldenthal and Julie Taymor	Nominated
World Soundtrack Awards	October 11, 2003	Soundtrack Composer of the Year	Elliot Goldenthal	Won
