= 75th Academy Awards =

- Official poster by Alex Swart
- Date: March 23, 2003
- Site: Kodak Theatre; Hollywood, Los Angeles, California, U.S.
- Hosted by: Steve Martin
- Preshow hosts: Jann Carl; Chris Connelly; Jim Moret; Shaun Robinson
- Produced by: Gilbert Cates
- Directed by: Louis J. Horvitz

Highlights
- Best Picture: Chicago
- Most awards: Chicago (6)
- Most nominations: Chicago (13)

TV in the United States
- Network: ABC
- Duration: 3 hours, 30 minutes
- Ratings: 33.04 million 20.58% (Nielsen ratings)

The 75th Academy Awards ceremony, presented by the Academy of Motion Picture Arts and Sciences (AMPAS) took place on March 23, 2003, at the Kodak Theatre in Hollywood, Los Angeles. During the ceremony, AMPAS presented Academy Awards (commonly referred to as Oscars) in 24 categories honoring films released in 2002. The ceremony, televised in the United States by ABC, was produced by Gilbert Cates and was directed by Louis J. Horvitz. Actor Steve Martin hosted for the second time, having previously presided over the 73rd ceremony held in 2001. Three weeks earlier in a ceremony at Regent Beverly Wilshire Hotel in Beverly Hills, California held on March 1, the Academy Awards for Technical Achievement were presented by host Kate Hudson.

Chicago won six awards, including Best Picture. Other winners included The Pianist with three awards, Frida and The Lord of the Rings: The Two Towers with two, and 8 Mile, Adaptation, Bowling for Columbine, The ChubbChubbs!, The Hours, Nowhere in Africa, Road to Perdition, Spirited Away, Talk to Her, This Charming Man, and Twin Towers with one. The telecast garnered about 33 million viewers in the United States, making it the least-watched and lowest-rated televised Oscar ceremony to that point.

== Winners and nominees ==
The nominees for the 75th Academy Awards were announced on February 11, 2003, at the Samuel Goldwyn Theater in Beverly Hills, California, by Frank Pierson, president of the Academy, and Academy Award winning-actress Marisa Tomei. Chicago received the most nominations with thirteen; Gangs of New York came in second with ten.

The winners were announced during the awards ceremony on March 23, 2003. Chicago became the first musical film to win Best Picture since 1968's Oliver! At age 29, Adrien Brody was the youngest person to win Best Actor. With her 13th nomination, Meryl Streep became the most nominated actor in Oscar history. Meanwhile, Best Actor nominee Jack Nicholson earned his 12th nomination, extending his record as the most nominated male performer. Julianne Moore was the ninth performer to earn two acting nominations in the same year. "Lose Yourself" from 8 Mile became the first hip hop song to win the Best Original Song award.

=== Awards ===
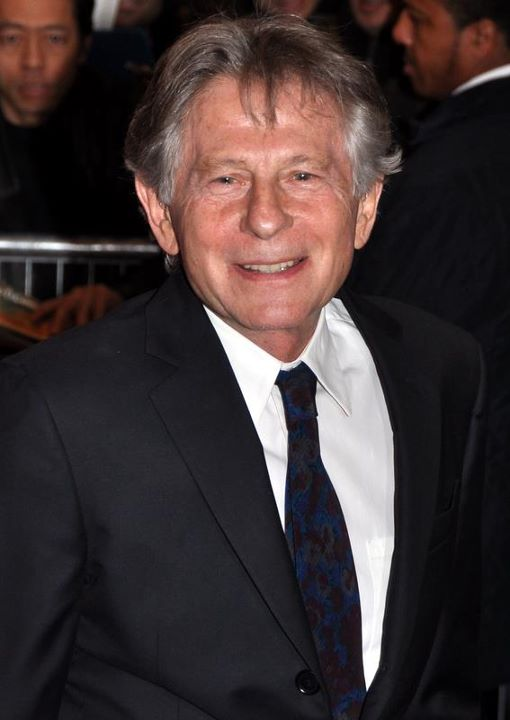
Roman Polanski, Best Director winner

Adrien Brody, Best Actor winner

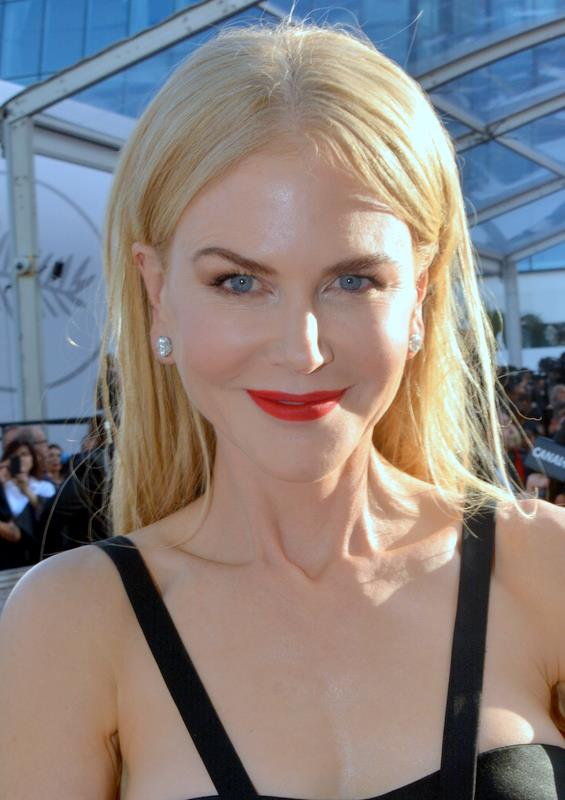
Nicole Kidman, Best Actress winner

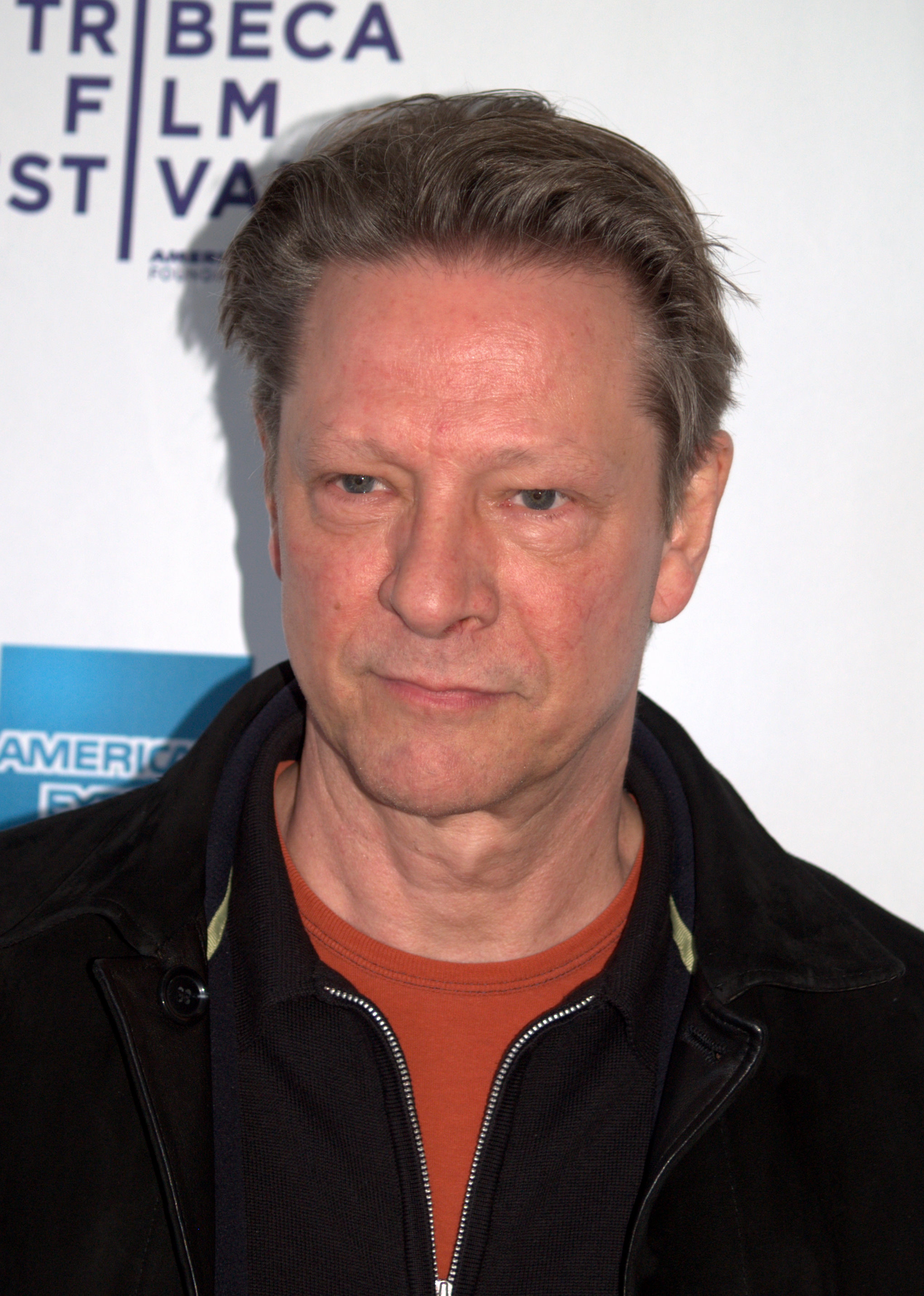
Chris Cooper, Best Supporting Actor winner

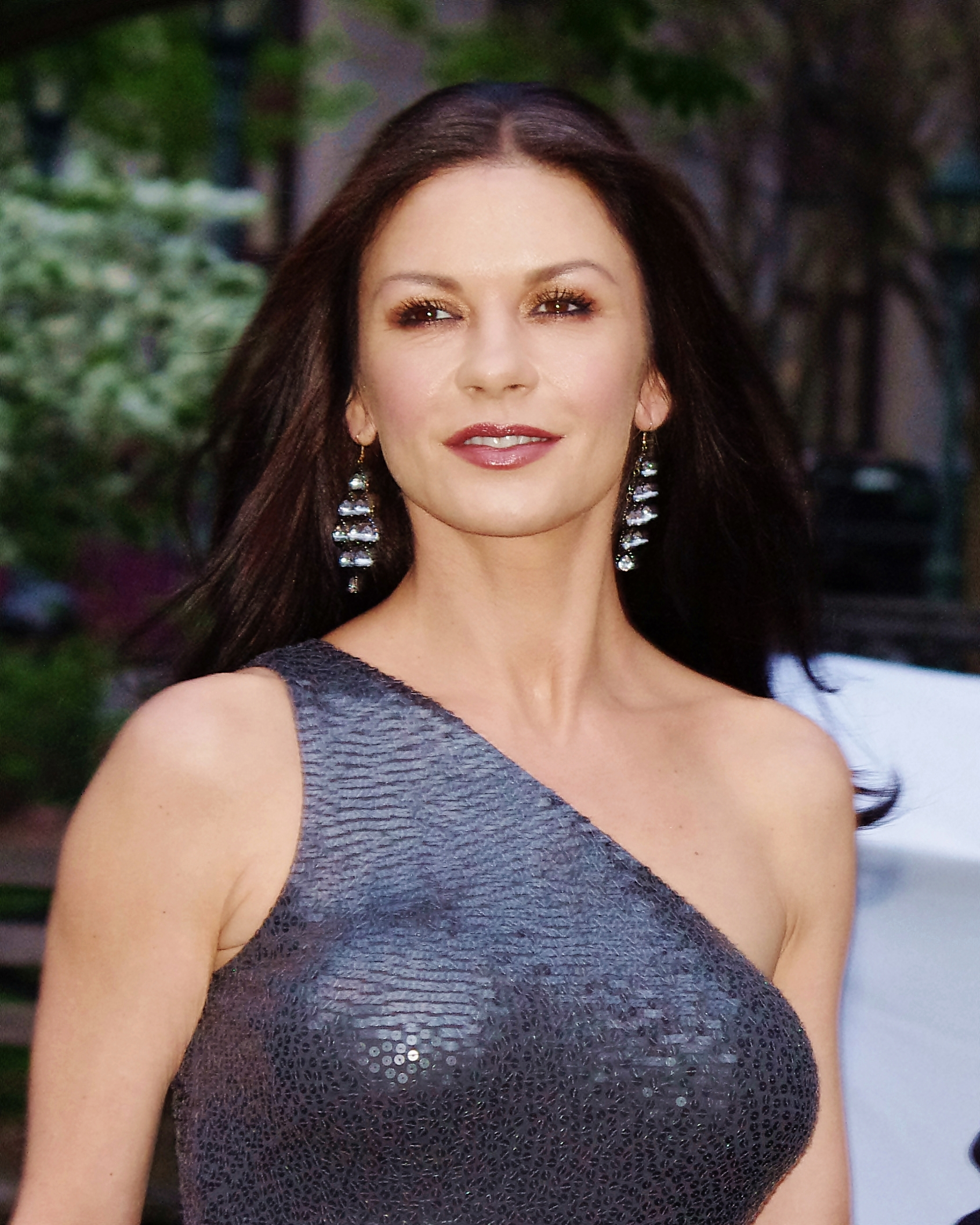
Catherine Zeta-Jones, Best Supporting Actress winner

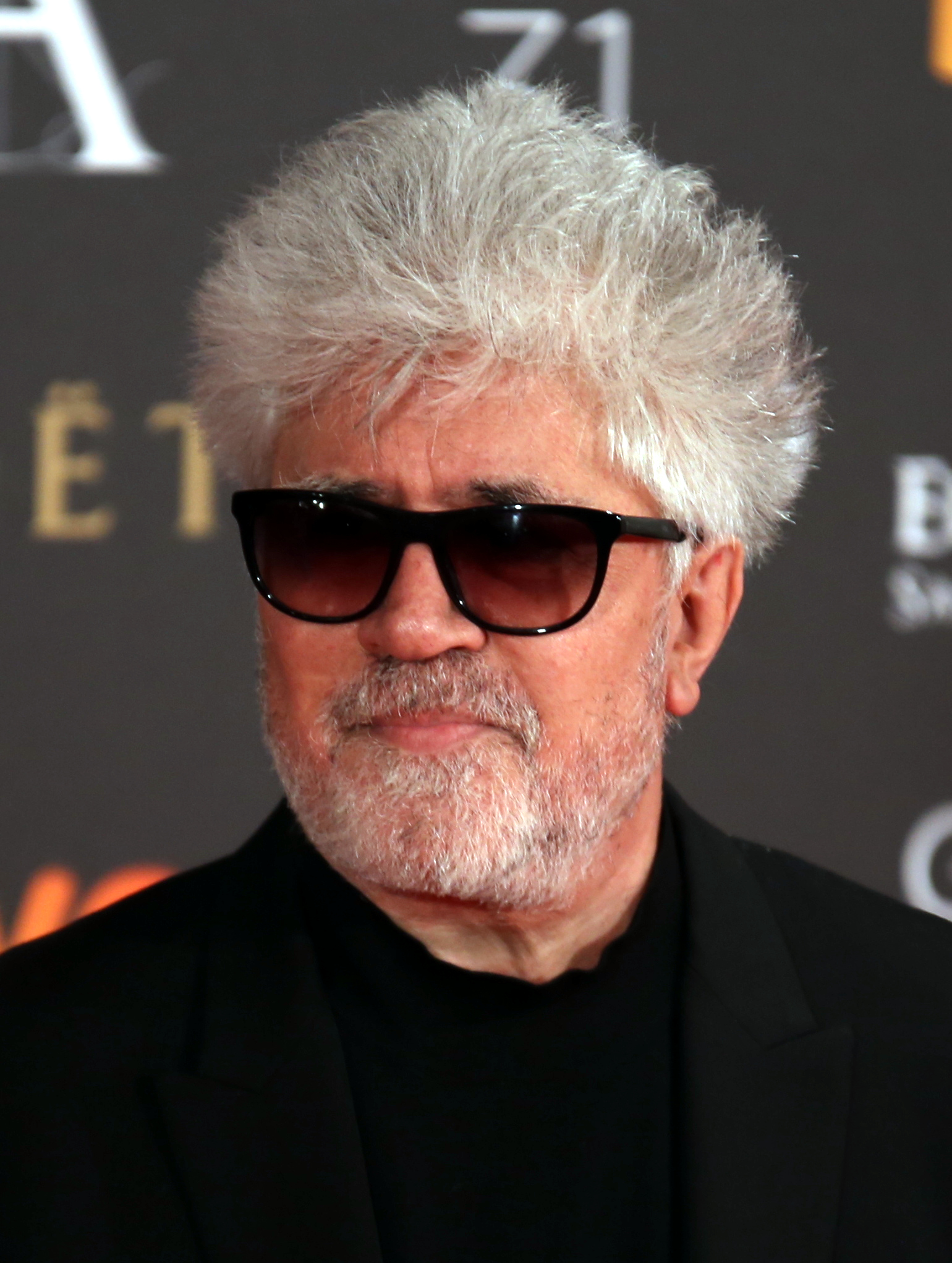
Pedro Almodóvar, Best Original Screenplay winner

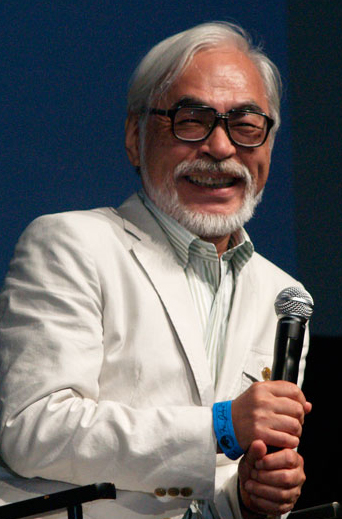
Hayao Miyazaki, Best Animated Feature Film winner

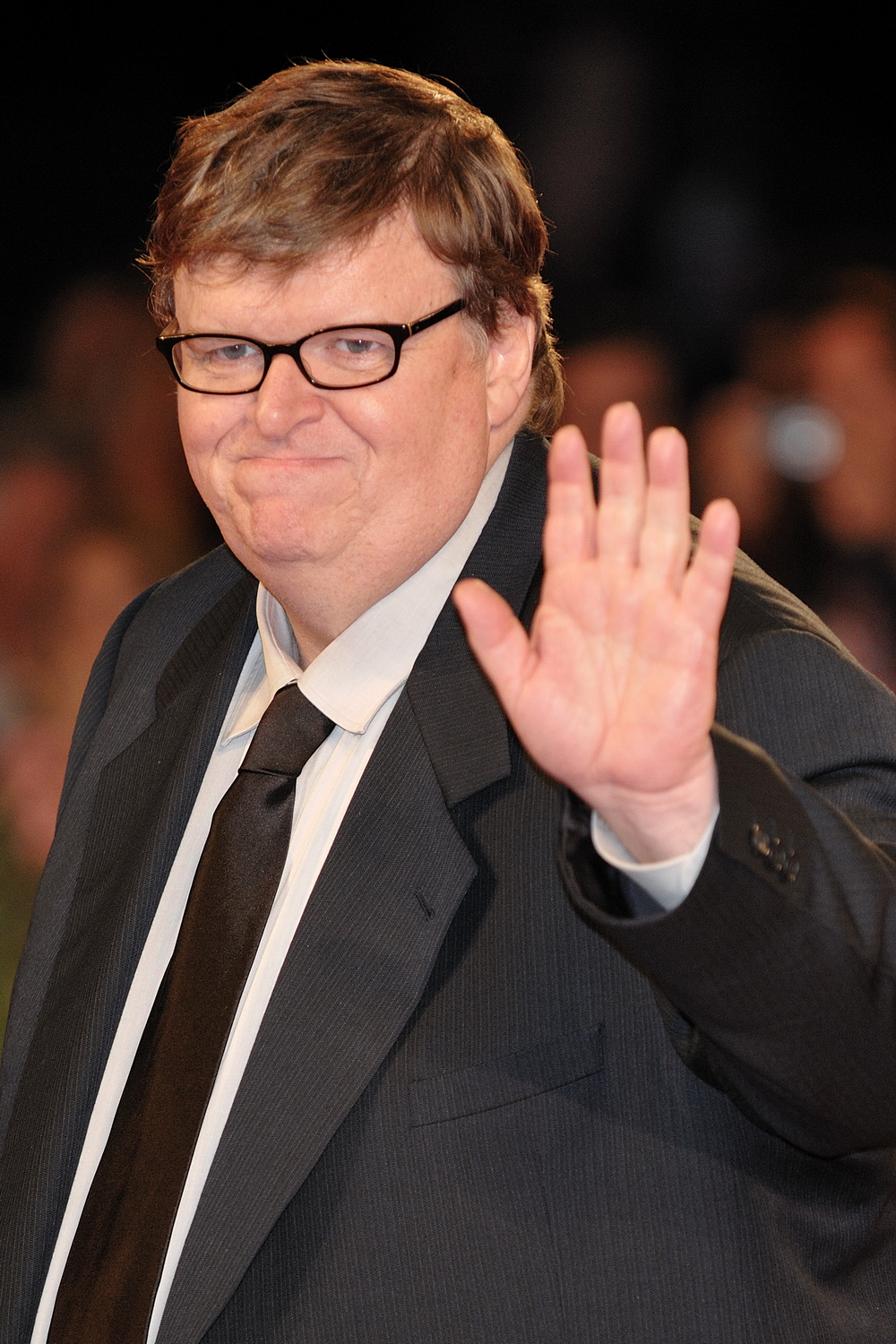
Michael Moore, Best Documentary Feature co-winner

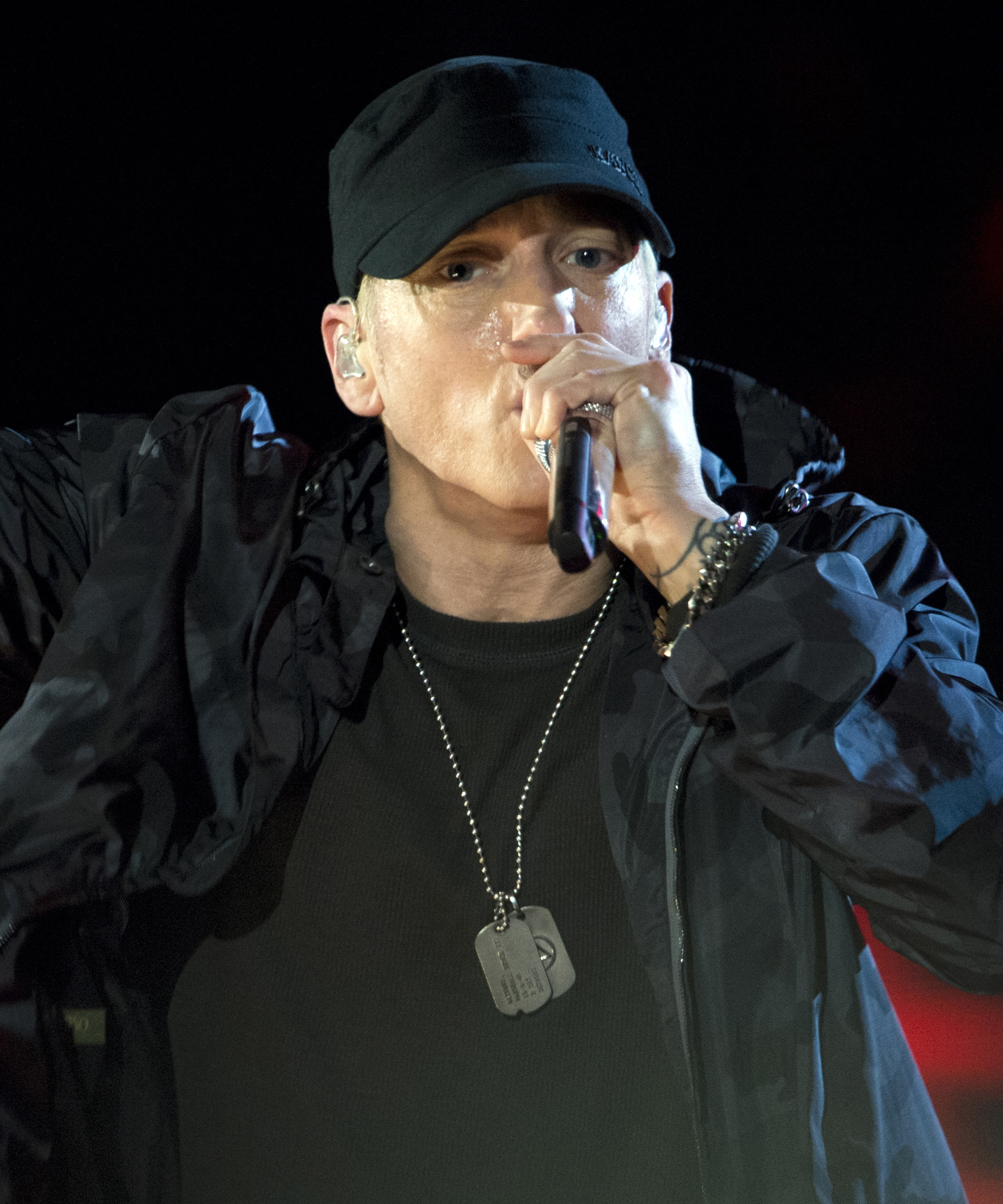
Eminem, Best Original Song co-winner

Winners are listed first, highlighted in boldface, and indicated with a double dagger (‡).

**Best Picture**: **Chicago – Martin Richards, producer**‡; Gangs of New York – Alberto Grimaldi and Harvey Weinstein, producers; The Hours – Scott Rudin and Robert Fox, producers; The Lord of the Rings: The Two Towers – Barrie M. Osborne, Fran Walsh, and Peter Jackson, producers; The Pianist – Roman Polanski, Robert Benmussa, and Alain Sarde, producers	**Best Directing**: **Roman Polanski – The Pianist**‡; Rob Marshall – Chicago; Martin Scorsese – Gangs of New York; Stephen Daldry – The Hours; Pedro Almodóvar – Talk to Her
**Best Actor in a Leading Role**: **Adrien Brody – The Pianist as Władysław Szpilman**‡; Nicolas Cage – Adaptation as Charlie Kaufman / Donald Kaufman; Michael Caine – The Quiet American as Thomas Fowler; Daniel Day-Lewis – Gangs of New York as Bill "The Butcher" Cutting; Jack Nicholson – About Schmidt as Warren R. Schmidt	**Best Actress in a Leading Role**: **Nicole Kidman – The Hours as Virginia Woolf**‡; Salma Hayek – Frida as Frida Kahlo; Diane Lane – Unfaithful as Constance "Connie" Sumner; Julianne Moore – Far from Heaven as Cathleen "Cathy" Whitaker; Renée Zellweger – Chicago as Roxie Hart
**Best Actor in a Supporting Role**: **Chris Cooper – Adaptation as John Laroche**‡; Ed Harris – The Hours as Richard "Richie" Brown; Paul Newman – Road to Perdition as John Rooney; John C. Reilly – Chicago as Amos Hart; Christopher Walken – Catch Me If You Can as Frank Abagnale Sr.	**Best Actress in a Supporting Role**: **Catherine Zeta-Jones – Chicago as Velma Kelly**‡; Kathy Bates – About Schmidt as Roberta Hertzel; Julianne Moore – The Hours as Laura McGrath Brown; Queen Latifah – Chicago as Matron "Mama" Morton; Meryl Streep – Adaptation as Susan Orlean
**Best Writing (Original Screenplay)**: **Talk to Her – Pedro Almodóvar**‡; Far from Heaven – Todd Haynes; Gangs of New York – Screenplay by Jay Cocks, Steven Zaillian, and Kenneth Lonergan; Story by Jay Cocks; My Big Fat Greek Wedding – Nia Vardalos; Y Tu Mamá También – Carlos Cuarón and Alfonso Cuarón	**Best Writing (Adapted Screenplay)**: **The Pianist – Ronald Harwood (based on the book by Władysław Szpilman)**‡; About a Boy – Peter Hedges, Chris Weitz and Paul Weitz (based on the book by Nick Hornby); Adaptation – Charlie Kaufman and Donald Kaufman (Note: Charlie Kaufman was the sole screenwriter of Adaptation, but he was credited as "Charlie Kaufman and Donald Kaufman", with Donald being his fictional twin brother in a film. In consequence, he was nominated under both names.) (based on the book The Orchid Thief by Susan Orlean); Chicago – Bill Condon (based on the play by Maurine Dallas Watkins); The Hours – David Hare (based on the novel by Michael Cunningham)
**Best Animated Feature Film**: **Spirited Away – Hayao Miyazaki**‡; Ice Age – Chris Wedge; Lilo & Stitch – Chris Sanders; Spirit: Stallion of the Cimarron – Jeffrey Katzenberg; Treasure Planet – Ron Clements	**Best Foreign Language Film**: **Nowhere in Africa (Germany) in German – Caroline Link**‡; The Crime of Father Amaro (Mexico) in Spanish – Carlos Carrera; Hero (China) in Mandarin – Zhang Yimou; The Man Without a Past (Finland) in Finnish – Aki Kaurismäki; Zus & Zo (Netherlands) in Dutch – Paula van der Oest
**Best Documentary (Feature)**: **Bowling for Columbine – Michael Moore and Michael Donovan**‡; Daughter from Danang – Gail Dolgin and Vicente Franco; Prisoner of Paradise – Malcolm Clarke and Stuart Sender; Spellbound – Jeffrey Blitz and Sean Welch; Winged Migration – Jacques Perrin	**Best Documentary (Short Subject)**: **Twin Towers – Bill Guttentag and Robert David Port**‡; The Collector of Bedford Street – Alice Elliott; Mighty Times: The Legacy of Rosa Parks – Robert Hudson and Bobby Houston; Why Can't We Be a Family Again? – Roger Weisberg and Murray Nossel
**Best Short Film (Live Action)**: **This Charming Man – Martin Strange-Hansen and Mie Andreasen**‡; Fait D'Hiver – Dirk Beliën and Anja Daelemans; I'll Wait for the Next One... (J'Attendrai Le Suivant...) – Philippe Orreindy and Thomas Gaudin; Inja (Dog) – Steven Pasvolsky and Joe Weatherstone; Johnny Flynton – Lexi Alexander and Alexander Buono	**Best Short Film (Animated)**: **The ChubbChubbs! – Eric Armstrong**‡; Das Rad – Chris Stenner and Heidi Wittlinger; The Cathedral – Tomek Baginski; Mike's New Car – Pete Docter and Roger L. Gould; Mt. Head – Kōji Yamamura
**Best Music (Original Score)**: **Frida – Elliot Goldenthal**‡; Catch Me If You Can – John Williams; Far from Heaven – Elmer Bernstein; The Hours – Philip Glass; Road to Perdition – Thomas Newman	**Best Music (Original Song)**: **"Lose Yourself" from 8 Mile – Music by Eminem, Jeff Bass, and Luis Resto; Lyrics by Eminem**‡; "Burn It Blue" from Frida – Music by Elliot Goldenthal; Lyrics by Julie Taymor; "Father and Daughter" from The Wild Thornberrys Movie – Music and Lyrics by Paul Simon; "The Hands That Built America" from Gangs of New York – Music and Lyrics by Bono, The Edge, Adam Clayton, and Larry Mullen; "I Move On" from Chicago – Music by John Kander; Lyrics by Fred Ebb
**Best Sound**: **Chicago – Michael Minkler, Dominick Tavella, and David Lee**‡; Gangs of New York – Tom Fleischman, Eugene Gearty and Ivan Sharrock; The Lord of the Rings: The Two Towers – Christopher Boyes, Michael Semanick, Michael Hedges and Hammond Peek; Road to Perdition – Scott Millan, Bob Beemer and John Patrick Pritchett; Spider-Man – Kevin O'Connell, Greg P. Russell and Ed Novick	**Best Sound Editing**: **The Lord of the Rings: The Two Towers – Ethan Van der Ryn and Michael Hopkins**‡; Minority Report – Gary Rydstrom and Richard Hymns; Road to Perdition – Scott A. Hecker
**Best Art Direction**: **Chicago – Art Direction: John Myhre; Set Decoration: Gordon Sim**‡; Frida – Art Direction: Felipe Fernández del Paso; Set Decoration: Hania Robledo; Gangs of New York – Art Direction: Dante Ferretti; Set Decoration: Francesca Lo Schiavo; The Lord of the Rings: The Two Towers – Art Direction: Grant Major; Set Decoration: Dan Hennah and Alan Lee; Road to Perdition – Art Direction: Dennis Gassner; Set Decoration: Nancy Haigh	**Best Cinematography**: **Road to Perdition – Conrad Hall (posthumous award)**‡; Chicago – Dion Beebe; Far from Heaven – Edward Lachman; Gangs of New York – Michael Ballhaus; The Pianist – Paweł Edelman
**Best Makeup**: **Frida – John Jackson and Beatrice De Alba**‡; The Time Machine – John M. Elliott Jr. and Barbara Lorenz	**Best Costume Design**: **Chicago – Colleen Atwood**‡; Frida – Julie Weiss; Gangs of New York – Sandy Powell; The Hours – Ann Roth; The Pianist – Anna B. Sheppard
**Best Film Editing**: **Chicago – Martin Walsh**‡; Gangs of New York – Thelma Schoonmaker; The Hours – Peter Boyle; The Lord of the Rings: The Two Towers – Michael J. Horton; The Pianist – Hervé de Luze	**Best Visual Effects**: **The Lord of the Rings: The Two Towers – Jim Rygiel, Joe Letteri, Randall William Cook, and Alex Funke**‡; Spider-Man – John Dykstra, Scott Stokdyk, Anthony LaMolinara and John Frazier; Star Wars: Episode II – Attack of the Clones – Rob Coleman, Pablo Helman, John Knoll and Ben Snow

=== Honorary Award ===
- To Peter O'Toole, whose remarkable talents have provided cinema history with some of its most memorable characters.

=== Films with multiple nominations and awards ===
Films with multiple nominations
Nominations	Film
13	Chicago
10	Gangs of New York
9	The Hours
7	The Pianist
6	Frida
6	Road to Perdition
6	The Lord of the Rings: The Two Towers
4	Adaptation
4	Far from Heaven
2	Talk to Her
2	About Schmidt
2	Catch Me If You Can
2	Spider-Man

Films with multiple awards
Awards	Film
6	Chicago
3	The Pianist
2	Frida
2	The Lord of the Rings: The Two Towers

== Presenters and performers ==
The following individuals presented awards or performed musical numbers.

=== Presenters ===
Name(s)	Role
Randy Thomas; Neil Ross	Announcers for the 75th Annual Academy Awards
Cameron Diaz	Presenter of the award for Best Animated Feature Film
Keanu Reeves	Presenter of the award for Best Visual Effects
Jennifer Connelly	Presenter of the award for Best Supporting Actor
Jennifer Lopez	Presenter of the award for Best Art Direction
John Travolta	Introducer of the performance of Best Original Song nominee "I Move On"
Jennifer Garner; Mickey Mouse	Presentations of the award for Best Animated Short Film
Jennifer Garner	Presenter of the award for Best Live Action Short Film
Mira Sorvino	Presenter of the award for Best Costume Design
Brendan Fraser	Presenter of the film The Lord of the Rings: The Two Towers on the Best Picture segment
Steve Martin	Introducer of the performance of Best Original Song nominee "Father and Daughter"
Nia Vardalos	Presenter of the award for Best Makeup
Sean Connery	Presenter of the award for Best Supporting Actress
Matthew McConaughey	Presenter of the film Gangs of New York on the Best Picture segment
Kate Hudson	Presenter of the segment of the Academy Awards for Technical Achievement and the Gordon E. Sawyer Award
Renée Zellweger	Presenter of the award for Best Original Score
Julie Andrews	Presenter of the montage highlighting past Academy Award telecast musical numbers
Gael García Bernal	Introducer of the performance of Best Original Song nominee "Burn it Blue"
Salma Hayek	Presenter of the award for Best Foreign Language Film
Julianne Moore	Presenter of the awards for Best Sound and Best Sound Editing
Diane Lane	Presenter of the award for Best Documentary Feature
Jack Valenti	Presenter of the award for Best Documentary Short Subject
Julia Roberts	Presenter of the award for Best Cinematography
Kathy Bates	Presenter of the montage interviewing previous acting Oscar winners
Colin Farrell	Introducer of the performance of Best Original Song nominee "The Hands That Built America"
Geena Davis	Presenter of the award for Best Film Editing
Susan Sarandon	Presenter of the "In Memoriam" tribute
Hilary Swank	Presenter of the film The Hours on the Best Picture segment
Barbra Streisand	Presenter of the award for Best Original Song
Dustin Hoffman	Presenter of the film The Pianist on the Best Picture segment
Meryl Streep	Presenter of the Academy Honorary Award to Peter O'Toole
Halle Berry	Presenter of the award for Best Actor
Denzel Washington	Presenter of the award for Best Actress
Olivia de Havilland	Presenter of the Oscar Family Album segment
Frank Pierson	Remarks by the AMPAS President
Richard Gere	Presenter of the film Chicago on the Best Picture segment
Marcia Gay Harden	Presenter of the award for Best Adapted Screenplay
Ben Affleck	Presenter of the award for Best Original Screenplay
Harrison Ford	Presenter of the award for Best Director
Kirk Douglas; Michael Douglas	Presenters of the award for Best Picture

=== Performers ===
Name(s)	Role	Performed
Bill Conti	Musical Conductor and Arranger	Orchestral
Queen Latifah; Catherine Zeta-Jones	Performers	"I Move On" from Chicago
Paul Simon	Performer	"Father and Daughter" from The Wild Thornberrys Movie
Lila Downs; Caetano Veloso	Performers	"Burn It Blue" from Frida
U2	Performers	"The Hands That Built America" from Gangs of New York

== Ceremony information ==
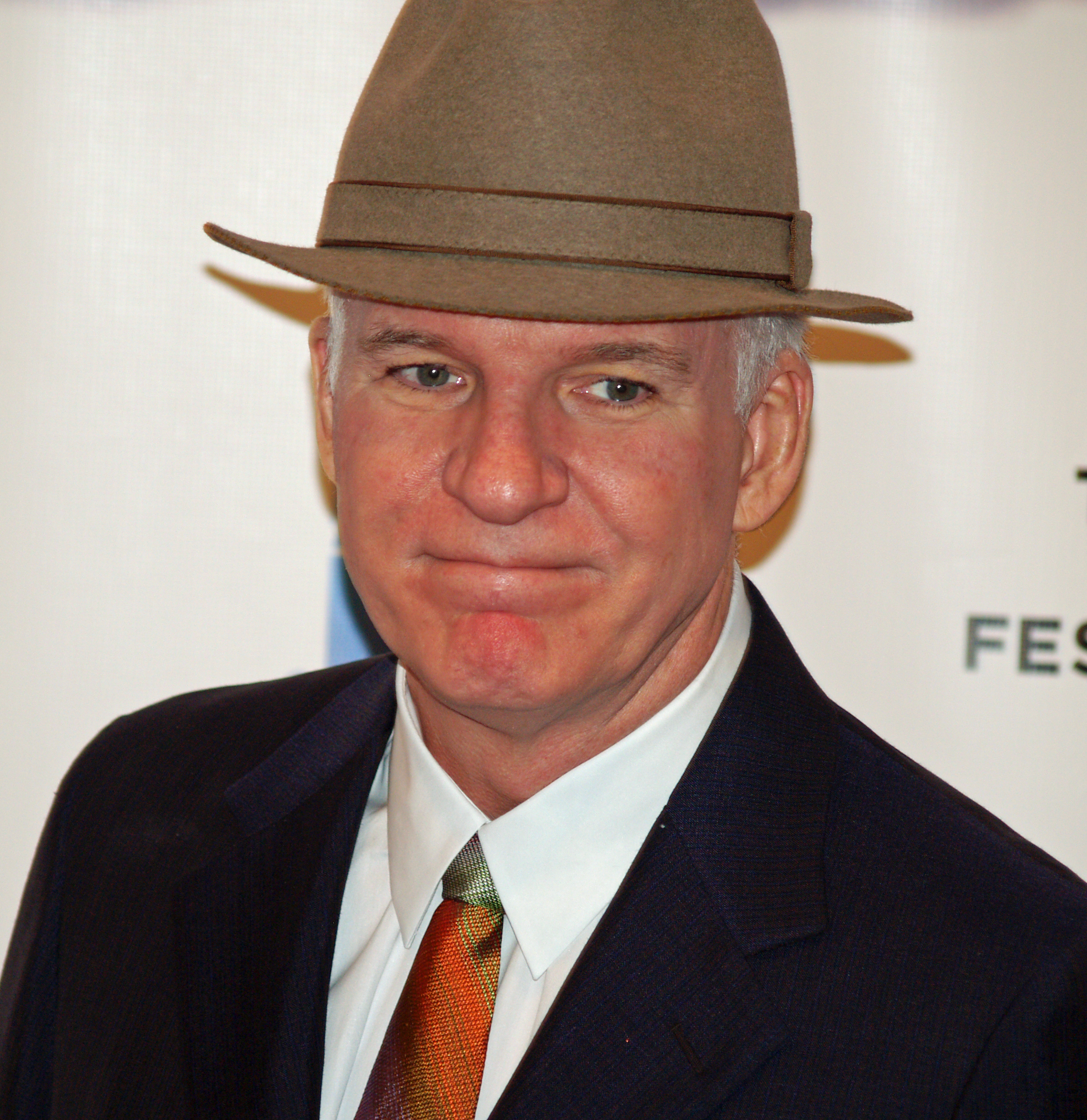
Steve Martin hosted the 75th Academy Awards

In November 2002, the Academy hired veteran Oscar telecast producer Gilbert Cates to oversee the telecast for the eleventh time. "With ten shows under his belt, no other living producer even comes close to the depth of his experience," said AMPAS president Frank Pierson in a press release announcing the selection. "Gil practically invented the awards show as a stylistic genre. We're privileged to have him present a very special event to celebrate the 75th anniversary of the Oscars." A few days later, actor and comedian Steve Martin was chosen to emcee the upcoming telecast. Cates explained his reason to bring back the veteran comedian saying, "A host who's witty, clever, sharp, intelligent, quick on his feet and always on top of the unfolding action. Wait, I've forgotten something. Oh yeah, and outrageously funny." According to the article published in the Los Angeles Times, Cates approached actor and veteran Oscar host Billy Crystal for emceeing duties. However, as time passed and Crystal was still undecided regarding the job, Cates offered the hosting role to Martin. In a statement, Martin expressed that he was honored to be selected to emcee the telecast joking, "I'm very pleased to be hosting the Oscars again, because fear and nausea always make me lose weight." In addition, this was the first Academy Award ceremony to be broadcast in high-definition.

Furthermore, the American-led invasion of Iraq affected the telecast and its surrounding events. Hours after news that the war had commenced several actors such as Cate Blanchett, Jim Carrey, and Will Smith resigned from their roles as presenters citing safety concerns and respect for military families. Despite pleas from broadcaster ABC to postpone the proceedings up to a week, AMPAS president Pierson and ceremony producer Cates refused to delay the gala to a different date citing unavailability of the Kodak Theatre during that time. Pierson also stated that moving the festivities to a different venue would be too expensive for the Academy. However, they also announced that the red carpet festivities would be severely curtailed. The bleacher seats situated along Hollywood Boulevard would also be dismantled, and ticket holders for those seats would receive rain checks that were good towards the following year's event. Periodically during commercial breaks, ABC News anchor and journalist Peter Jennings gave news brief updates regarding the events happening overseas.

To celebrate the 75th anniversary of the Academy Awards, 59 actors who have received both competitive and honorary awards appeared seated onstage together during a segment called Oscar's Family Album. Each former winner was acknowledged by announcers Randy Thomas and Neil Ross with the films he or she won for. At the end of the segment newly minted winners Adrien Brody, Chris Cooper, Nicole Kidman, and Catherine Zeta-Jones, along with Honorary Oscar recipient Peter O'Toole, joined them.

=== Box office performance of nominated films ===
At the time of the nominations announcement on February 11, the combined gross of the five Best Picture nominees at the US box office was $486 million, with an average of $97.3 million per film. The Lord of the Rings: The Two Towers was the highest earner among the Best Picture nominees with $321 million in domestic box office receipts. The film was followed by Gangs of New York ($70.1 million), Chicago ($64.5 million), The Hours ($21.8 million), and finally The Pianist ($9.1 million).

Of the top 50 grossing movies of the year, 47 nominations went to 14 films on the list. Only The Lord of the Rings: The Two Towers (2nd), My Big Fat Greek Wedding (5th), Ice Age (9th), Catch Me If You Can (11th), Lilo & Stitch (13th), Road to Perdition (23rd), Spirit: Stallion of the Cimarron (35th), Gangs of New York (37th), and Chicago (41st) were nominated for Best Picture, Best Animated Feature, or any of the directing, acting, or screenwriting awards. The other top 50 box office hits that earned nominations were Spider-Man (1st), Star Wars: Episode II: Attack of the Clones (3rd), Minority Report (16th), 8 Mile (22nd), and The Time Machine (44th).

=== Bowling for Columbine acceptance speech ===
Shortly after winning the Academy Award for Best Documentary Feature, Bowling for Columbine director Michael Moore spoke out against U.S. President George W. Bush and the Iraq War, which had just started three days prior. He further criticized the president by stating, "We live in a time where [sic] we have fictitious election results that elects [sic] a fictitious president. We live in a time where [sic] we have a man sending us to war for fictitious reasons." The speech was received with a cacophony of boos, applause, and standing ovations from the audience at the theater. Moments after the speech concluded, in order to lighten the mood, host Martin joked, "The Teamsters are helping Michael Moore into the trunk of his limo."

=== Critical response ===
The show received a positive reception from most media publications. Television critic Robert Bianco of USA Today commended Martin's hosting performance writing that, "Luckily for viewers, Martin has two other qualities that are essential to a good Academy Awards host: wit and insider status. He used both to his and our advantage, winning the crowd's confidence and then gleefully mocking them all night." He also noted that the political remarks from presenters and speeches "a touch of tension to what is so often a dull evening." Pittsburgh Post-Gazette television columnist Rob Owen raved that "Martin radiates class and wit, something often lacking in awards show hosts. From jokes about the allegedly scaled-down ceremony to reaction to his return to the Oscar stage, Martin entertained consistently." He also quipped that even the segments honoring Oscar history "seemed tighter and less tedious." Tom Shales of The Washington Post gave high marks to Martin commenting, "Helping immeasurably to make it a great show was Steve Martin, who served as host for the second time and triumphed as a welcome sardonic voice amid all the usual piousness and self-adulation." He also commented that despite the toned-down atmosphere, the speeches and tributes provided several heartfelt and memorable moments desperately needed in uncertain times.

Some media outlets were more critical of the show. Television critic Ken Tucker of Entertainment Weekly bemoaned, "A wonderful, intelligent Oscar host two years ago, Martin on this night looked as though he'd thrown in the towel backstage and let comedy writer Bruce Vilanch come up with a batch of gormless ain't-Hollywood-goofy lines to absolve him of responsibility for being hilarious." Chicago Tribune columnist Steve Johnson lamented, "Martin in his second turn hosting Hollywood's big night was, especially in the early going, slightly off-key, his attempt to keep a jovial face on things understandable but eventually coming to seem a touch disrespectful." He went on to say, "Except for the Moore line, he simply was not able to perform a perhaps impossible task, putting people at ease about attending, or watching, a party as a war raged, visible to anyone who flipped over to CNN." David Zurawik of The Baltimore Sun quipped, "As the rest of the world saw televised images of captives and corpses identified as American soldiers, we watched host Steve Martin and a theater full of celebrities celebrating their self importance. Try as they might last night in the capital of Fantasy Land to create a program that would transport us beyond current events, they never came close." He also complained that many of the evening's comments and jokes seemed tone deaf and disrespectful in light of the war.

=== Ratings and reception ===
The American telecast on ABC drew in an average of 33.04 million people over its length, which was a 21% decrease from the previous year's ceremony. An estimated 62.55 million total viewers watched all or part of the awards. The show also earned lower Nielsen ratings compared to the previous ceremony with 20.58% of households watching over a 40.34 share. In addition, it garnered a lower 18–49 demo rating with a 12.55 rating over a 35.37 share among viewers in that demographic. Many media outlets observed that cable news coverage of the Iraq War diverted home viewers' attention from the ceremony and therefore contributed to the lower ratings. At the time, it earned the lowest viewership for an Academy Award telecast since figures were compiled beginning with the 46th ceremony in 1974 and the lowest ratings for any broadcast since Nielsen Media Research kept track of such data since the 33rd ceremony in 1961.

In July 2003, the ceremony presentation received eight nominations at the 55th Primetime Emmys. Two months later, the ceremony won three of those nominations for Outstanding Art Direction For A Variety Or Music Program (Roy Christopher), Outstanding Lighting Direction (Electronic, Multi-camera) for a Variety, Music or Comedy Program (Robert Barnhart, Robert A. Dickinson, Andy O'Reilly), and Outstanding Music Direction (Bill Conti).

== "In Memoriam" ==
The annual "In Memoriam" tribute, presented by actress Susan Sarandon, honored the following people.

- Lew Wasserman – Executive
- Richard Sylbert – Production designer
- Eddie Bracken – Actor
- George Sidney – Director
- Katy Jurado – Actress
- Jack Brodsky – Producer
- Dudley Moore – Actor, comedian, musician
- John Frankenheimer – Director
- Rod Steiger – Actor
- Norman Panama – Writer, director, producer
- Horst Buchholz – Actor
- J. L. Thompson – Director
- Leo McKern – Actor
- Kay Rose – Sound editor
- Milton Berle – Comedian, actor
- Ward Kimball – Animator
- Margaret Booth – Editor
- Signe Hasso – Actress
- Daniel Taradash – Writer
- Richard Crenna – Actor
- Walter Scharf – Composer, conductor
- Rosemary Clooney – Singer, actress
- Charles Guggenheim – Documentarian
- Kim Hunter – Actress
- Adolph Green – Screenwriter, lyricist
- Alberto Sordi – Actor
- Marvin Mirisch – Executive
- Conrad Hall – Cinematographer
- George Roy Hill – Director
- Richard Harris – Actor
- James Coburn – Actor
- Billy Wilder – Director

== See also ==
- 9th Screen Actors Guild Awards
- 23rd Golden Raspberry Awards
- 45th Grammy Awards
- 55th Primetime Emmy Awards
- 56th British Academy Film Awards
- 57th Tony Awards
- 27th Laurence Olivier Awards
- 60th Golden Globe Awards
- List of submissions to the 75th Academy Awards for Best Foreign Language Film

== Bibliography ==
- Osborne, Robert (2013). 85 Years of the Oscar: The Complete History of the Academy Awards. New York, United States: Abbeville Publishing Group. ISBN 978-0-7892-1142-2.
- Pond, Steve (2005), The Big Show: High Times and Dirty Dealings Backstage at the Academy Awards, New York, United States: Faber and Faber, ISBN 0-571-21193-3.
