= Man at the Crossroads =

1933 fresco by Diego Rivera

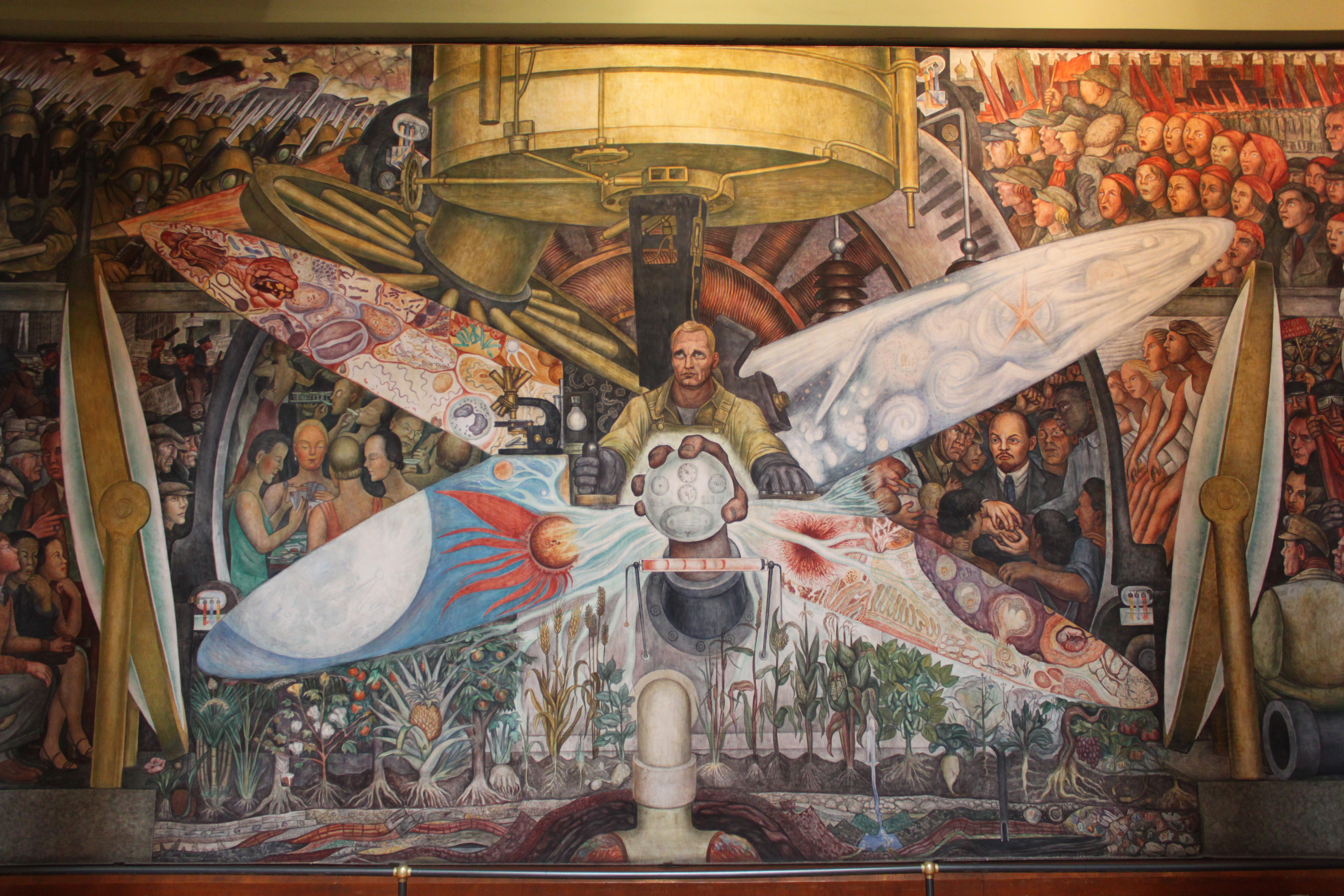
- The recreated version of the painting, known as Man, Controller of the Universe
- Artist: Diego Rivera
- Year: 1933
- Medium: Fresco
- Movement: Mexican muralist
- Dimensions: 4.85 m × 11.45 m (15.9 ft × 37.6 ft)
- Condition: Destroyed; a smaller replica made by Rivera in 1934 is located in the Palacio de Bellas Artes
- Location: 30 Rockefeller Plaza, New York City

Man at the Crossroads (1933) was a fresco by Mexican painter Diego Rivera. Originally slated to be installed in the lobby of the RCA Building at Rockefeller Center in New York City, the fresco showed aspects of contemporary social and scientific culture. As originally installed, it was a three-paneled artwork. A central panel, depicting a worker controlling machinery, was flanked by two other panels, The Frontier of Ethical Evolution and The Frontier of Material Development, which respectively represented socialism and capitalism.

The Rockefeller family approved of the fresco's idea: showing the contrast of capitalism as opposed to communism. However, after the New York World-Telegram complained about the piece, calling it "anti-capitalist propaganda", Rivera added images of Vladimir Lenin and a Soviet May Day parade in response. When these were discovered, Nelson Rockefeller – at the time a director of the Rockefeller Center – wanted Rivera to remove the portrait of Lenin, but Rivera was unwilling to do so.

In May 1933, Rockefeller ordered Man at the Crossroads to be plastered over and thereby destroyed before it was finished, resulting in protests and boycotts from other artists. The fresco was peeled off in 1934 and replaced by a mural from Josep Maria Sert three years later. Only black-and-white photographs exist of the original incomplete fresco, taken when Rivera suspected it might be destroyed. Using the photographs, Rivera repainted the composition in Mexico under the variant title Man, Controller of the Universe.

The controversy over the fresco was significant because Rivera's communist ideals contrasted with the theme of Rockefeller Center, even though the Rockefeller family themselves admired Rivera's work. The creation and destruction of the fresco is dramatized in the films Cradle Will Rock (1999) and Frida (2002). The reactions to the fresco's controversy have been dramatized in Archibald MacLeish's 1933 collection Frescoes for Mr. Rockefeller's City as well as in E. B. White's 1933 poem "I paint what I see: A ballad of artistic integrity".

== Commission ==
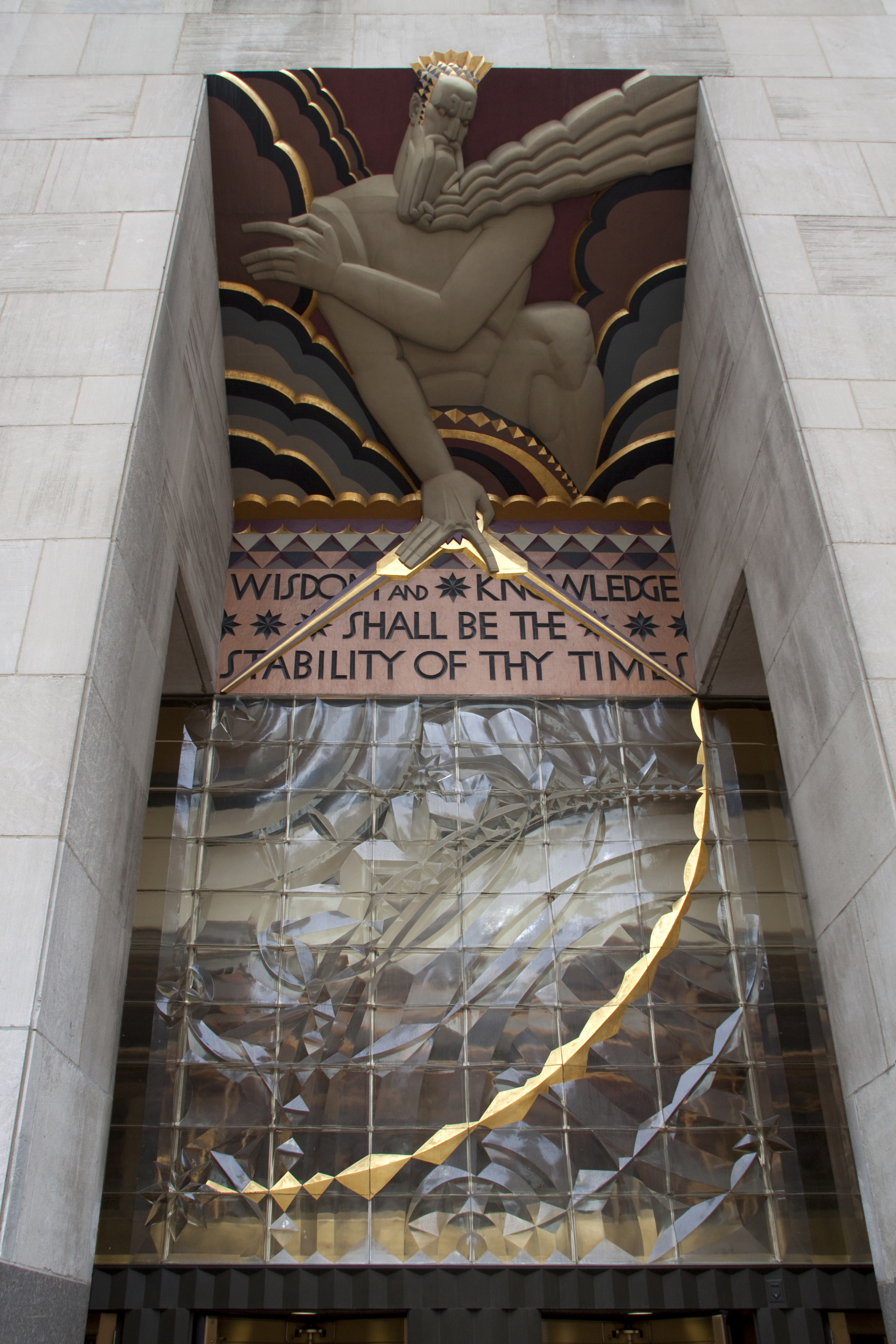
30 Rockefeller Plaza, where Man at the Crossroads was originally installed

John D. Rockefeller Jr., a businessman and member of the Rockefeller family, was heavily involved in the construction of Rockefeller Center in the 1930s. He wanted to have a 63 by 17 feet (19.2 by 5.2 m) mural placed on the lobby wall of the RCA Building (now 30 Rockefeller Plaza), the largest structure in Rockefeller Center. Meanwhile, his wife, Abby Aldrich Rockefeller, was a patron of the socialist Mexican artist Diego Rivera. This had been the case since winter 1931–1932, when Abby purchased many of Rivera's pieces at a Museum of Modern Art (MoMA) exhibition.

At the time, Rivera was painting a controversial fresco in Detroit entitled Detroit Industry, commissioned by the Rockefellers' friend, Edsel Ford, who later became a MoMA trustee. Rivera had recently been kicked out of Communist Party USA for accepting commissions from wealthy patrons, and his commission for Detroit Industry did not help improve the Communist Party's views of him.

The writer Daniel Okrent states that a key event in Man at the Crossroad's conception occurred during a luncheon that Abby hosted in January 1932, at which Rivera was a guest. Abby suggested that a mural by Rivera would be a positive addition to Rockefeller Center. The entire Rockefeller family became close friends with Rivera and his wife Frida Kahlo over the next few months, which led to the decision to commission Rivera for the RCA Building's mural. Rivera was given the theme "Man at the Crossroads Looking with Hope and High Vision to the Choosing of a New and Better Future", since John wanted the painting to make people pause and think. The historian Alan Balfour writes that the Rockefellers had full knowledge of Rivera's communist activities, but hired him anyway.

Rivera was officially commissioned by Todd, Robertson & Todd, the development agents for Rockefeller Center. The full commission had planned for Man at the Crossroads to be a three-paneled mural. The two panels to either side, The Frontier of Ethical Evolution and The Frontier of Material Development, would respectively contrast capitalism and socialism. According to Rivera's verbal description of the planned mural, the center panel would depict a person at the literal intersection of these two ideals (namely, the "man at the crossroads").

The RCA Building lobby's wall had such a prominent position within Rockefeller Center that John and Abby Rockefeller's son Nelson had originally wanted Henri Matisse and Pablo Picasso to create the paintings on either side of Man at the Crossroads. Nelson had chosen these artists because he favored their modern style. Rivera's artistic renown made his commission all the more fitting, since it was so prominently located. However, neither of the other two artists were available: Matisse was already completing commissions for Philadelphia's Barnes Foundation at the time, while Picasso never responded to the wire that requested a meeting with "Pierre Picasso". Josep Maria Sert and Frank Brangwyn were later hired to paint other murals in their place. Sert would paint murals on the northern corridor, while Brangwyn would paint murals on the southern corridor.

Rivera did not agree with principal Rockefeller Center architect Raymond Hood's suggestion that the mural be commissioned exclusively in grayscale colors. He also declined to take part in an artistic competition prior to the announcement of his commission, and wanted to withdraw from the project when it was announced that neither Matisse nor Picasso would be painting at the RCA Building. He eventually acquiesced after Nelson convinced Hood to remove his grayscale requirement and allowed Rivera to paint Man at the Crossroads in a fresco format. However, Rivera withdrew again after Sert and Brangwyn were announced as the new artists, calling them "two inferior painters". He eventually rejoined the project by fall 1932.

As part of the contract, Rivera would be paid $21,000 for the work. This was considerably more than the $10,000 he had been paid for Detroit Industry, which he continued painting even as he was negotiating for Man at the Crossroads. According to Daniel Okrent, Rivera did not read the fine print of the contract that he signed, which stipulated that in exchange for the $21,000, Rockefeller Center Inc. would hold full ownership of Man at the Crossroads; this would lead to a controversy when the work was later removed from the RCA Building.

Rivera showed Abby the sketch of his proposed work in November 1932. Nelson and John also looked at the sketch, and Nelson concluded that there was nothing controversial about the planned mural. Rivera and the Rockefellers signed a contract in which they agreed that the sketch was the final plan for the mural, and that the completed work could not be different from what was on that sketch. In March 1933, Rivera traveled from Detroit to New York so he could work on the RCA Building mural. He employed artists from around the world in his six-person crew, which also included the artists Ben Shahn and Lucienne Bloch. Rivera's assistants converted his small sketch to full-size 1-square-foot (0.093 m^{2}) pieces of tracing paper, which would then be painted onto the wall. Also in March 1933, Webster B. Todd, one of the contractors working on the construction of Rockefeller Center, requested sketches of Man at the Crossroads because he was concerned about the mural's potential controversial effect. Even so, Rivera did not express worry about any potential issues, even expressing pride over his work when The New York Times wrote a lengthy profile on him on April 2, 1933. The Rockefellers did not show concern either, and the complex's publicist Merle Crowell took credit for the New York Times article.

== Work ==
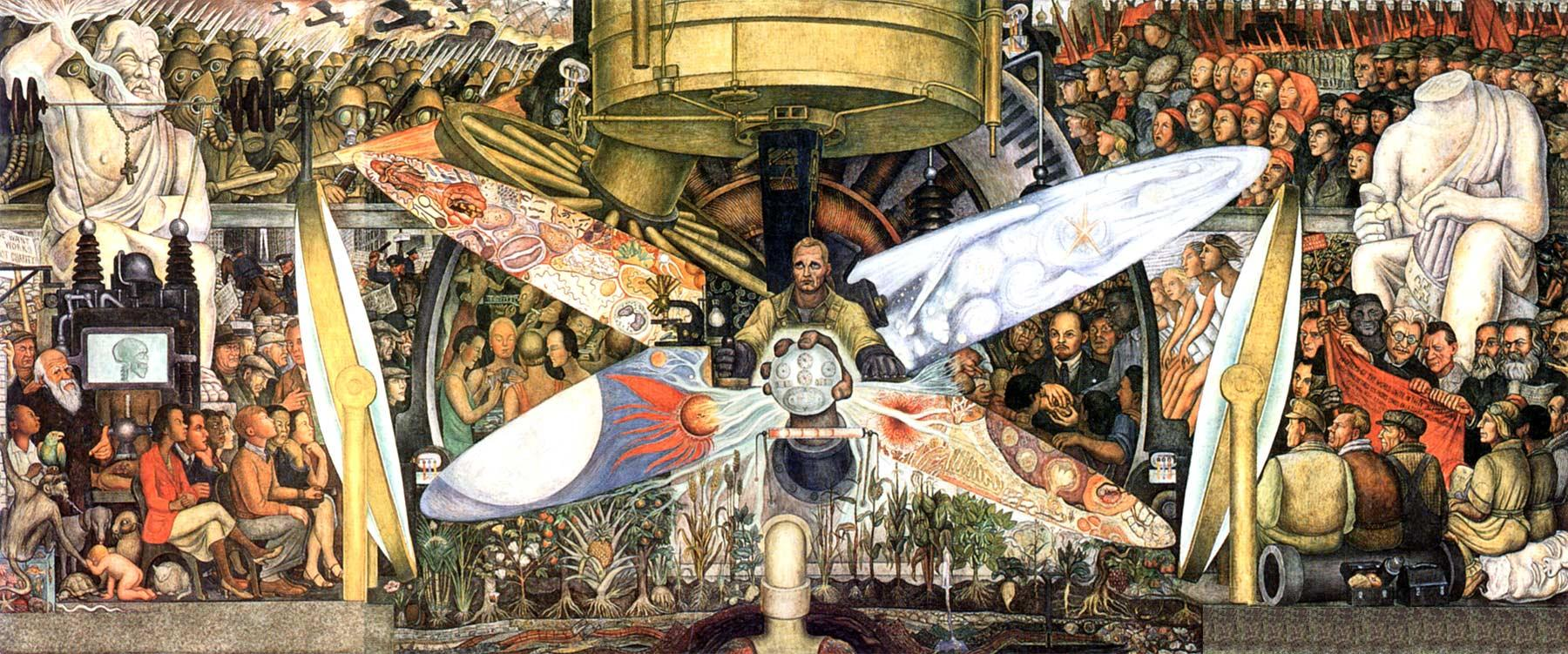
The Fresco in its entirety

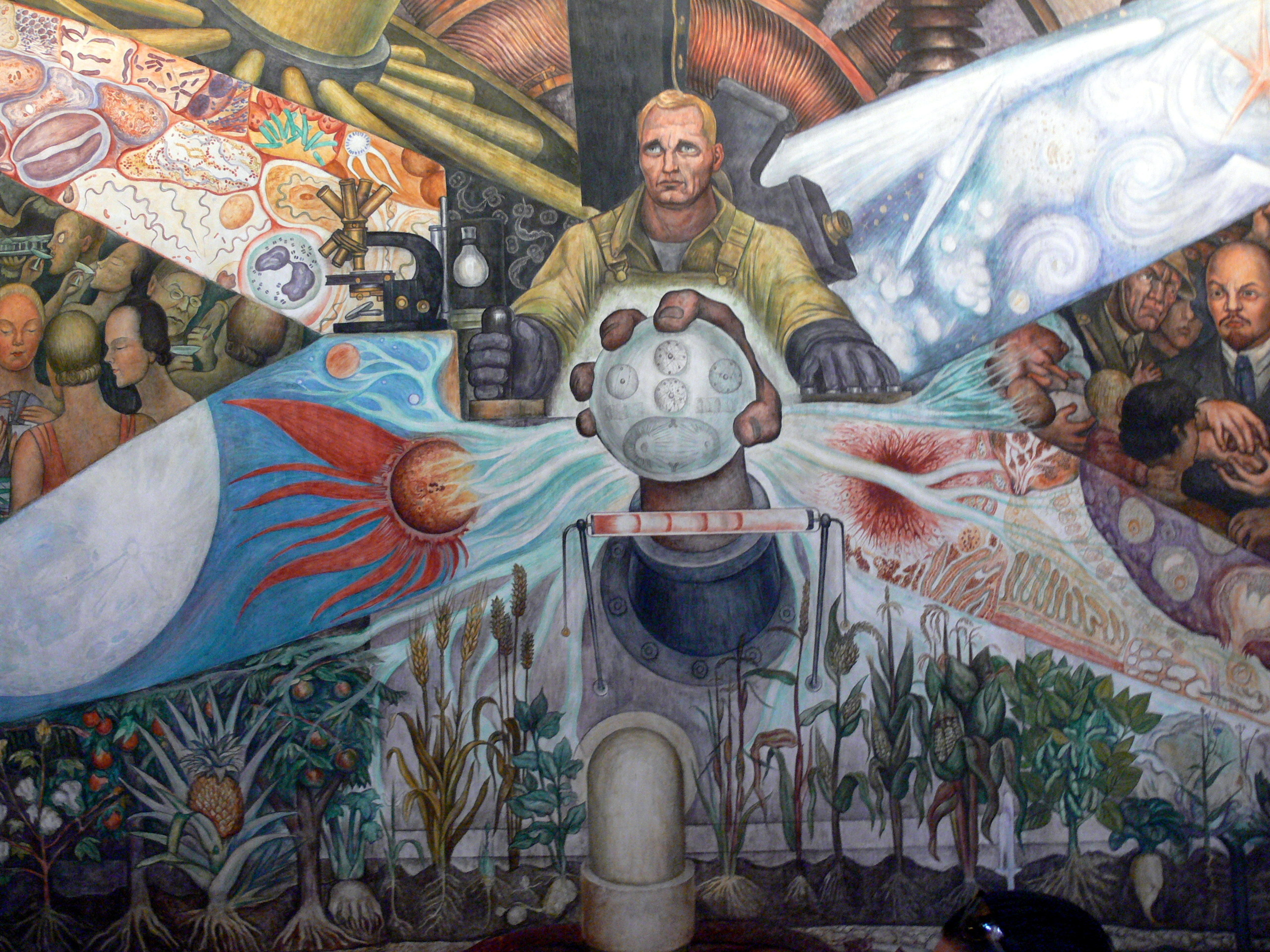
The central scene

Rivera's composition depicted many aspects of contemporary social and scientific culture, and as with his other paintings, contained influences from Communism. In the center, a workman was depicted controlling machinery. Before him, a giant fist emerged holding an orb depicting the recombination of atoms and dividing cells in acts of chemical and biological generation. From the central figure four propeller-like shapes stretched to the corner of the composition, depicting arcs of light created by giant lenses anchoring the left and right edges of the space. Rivera described these as "elongated ellipses". Within these, cosmological and biological forces such as exploding suns and cell-forms were depicted. These represented the discoveries made possible by the telescope and the microscope.

Between and beyond the arcs were scenes of modern social life. Wealthy society women were seen playing cards and smoking at the left. Opposite, on the right, Lenin was seen holding hands with a multi-racial group of workers. Soldiers and war machinery occupied the top left above the society women, and a Russian May Day rally with red flags was seen at the right, above Lenin. For Rivera, this represented contrasting social visions: the "debauched rich" watched by the unemployed while war raged, and a socialist utopia ushered in by Lenin. Beyond the giant lenses to left and right were depicted figures contemplating the central scene, behind which were gigantic classical statues. The one on the left depicted an angry Jupiter, whose raised hand holding a thunderbolt had been severed by a lightning strike. This comprised The Frontier of Ethical Evolution. The one on the right was a headless seated Caesar. This comprised The Frontier of Material Development. For Rivera these represented the replacement of superstition by scientific mastery of nature, and the overthrow of authoritarian rule by liberated workers.

The bottom part of the painting was to depict the controlled growth of natural resources, in the form of a variety of plants emerging from their roots, visible in a cut-away view under the soil. This portion of the original mural was never completed, and it exists only in the later recreation of the composition in Mexico.

== Destruction ==
=== Initial controversy ===
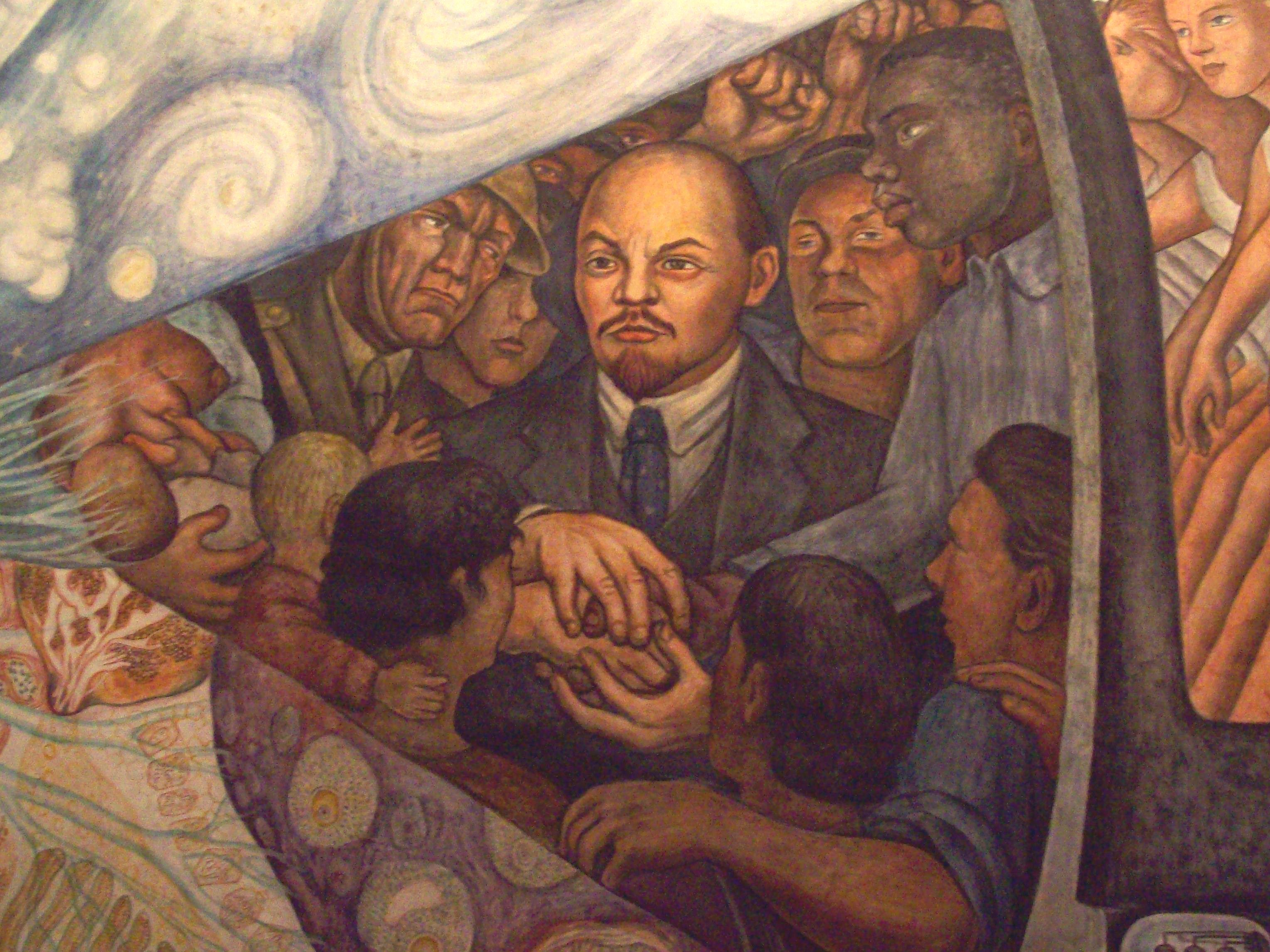
The controversial portrait of Lenin, as seen in the recreated painting.

On 24 April 1933, the New York World-Telegram published an article attacking the mural as anti-capitalist propaganda. As a defiant response to the article, Rivera or one of his assistants added a portrait of Lenin to the mural, which had not been apparent in initial sketches. The Rockefellers did not express any visible concern about the mural. On April 28, to ensure that the late addition of Lenin would be undetected, Rivera sent his assistants to make sure that there was no trace of the Lenin portrait in the blueprints and outlines for Man at the Crossroads. Rivera thought that if anyone were to check the blueprints, they would not be able to discern the hidden portrait of Lenin unless they looked closely. He believed that his close relationship with the Rockefellers would permit the surreptitious addition of the portrait. The Lenin portrait would still have gone unnoticed if not for a mistake made by workmen applying a final coat of paint to the wall above Rivera's mural. Some of the paint dripped onto the mural, and when Raymond Hood went to examine the drip, he found the portrait of Lenin.

Following the discovery of Lenin's portrait, Nelson Rockefeller delayed the mural's planned May 1 unveiling. He wrote to Rivera to request that the painter remove the picture of Lenin. The portrait was the only thing about Man at the Crossroads that offended the Rockefeller family, despite the presence of other overtly Communist icons such as the hammer and sickle. A letter of reply from Rivera, written on May 6, politely declined to remove Lenin's portrait, but by way of a compromise, offered to add Abraham Lincoln to the work. Rivera also said that he would be amenable to adding portraits of other American icons such as the abolitionists Nat Turner, John Brown, or Harriet Beecher Stowe, but he refused to remove the portrait of Lenin:

"Rather than mutilate the conception [of the mural], I shall prefer the physical destruction of the conception in its entirety, but preserving, at least, its integrity."

Daniel Okrent states that Rivera did not write the letter himself, instead leaving the task to Ben Shahn, the assistant most strongly opposed to Nelson's request to remove the Lenin portrait.

Nelson then left the decision about the future of the mural to Todd, Robertson & Todd. Hugh Robertson, one of the firm's principals, had written a reply to Rivera by May 9. In the letter, Robertson wrote that Rivera had deceived Rockefeller Center Inc. in the contract he made with them, and thus, Rivera was compelled to remove the Lenin portrait immediately. However, it was unclear whether Rivera understood that the painting belonged to Rockefeller Center Inc. After reading the letter, Rivera went back to his painting.

=== Removal ===
On 10 May 1933, as Rivera and his assistants worked on the mural, they were scrutinized throughout the day during what Rivera called "the battle of Rockefeller Center". By the evening, Robertson had ordered that Rivera stop all work on the mural. Rivera was paid in full, but the mural was covered in stretched canvas and left incomplete. He was unsatisfied with the monetary payment, saying that he intended to complete the mural: "I will not change my mural even if I lose in the courts." Rivera's net profit from Man at the Crossroads only amounted to US$7,000 (equivalent to $174,100 in 2025), a third of his total payment, after accounting for all expenses. He promised to reproduce the mural at any building that asked him to do so. On May 12, two days after the stop-work order was announced, Rivera was also dismissed from a commission at Chicago's Century of Progress exhibition, where he had been hired to paint a mural for General Motors' pavilion. An architect for GM cited the controversy surrounding Man at the Crossroads as the grounds for Rivera's dismissal.

The concealment of Man at the Crossroads was itself controversial. The artist John Sloan, the writer Lewis Mumford, and the photographer Alfred Stieglitz all showed support toward Rivera's position, while the Communist Party was stuck between endorsing a former member or his wealthy patron. The painter Edwin Blashfield supported Rivera's dismissal because the premise of Man at the Crossroads was contrary to the U.S. government. In May 1933, Rockefeller Center Inc. announced that the mural would "remain hidden for an indefinite time". Within days of the stop-work order, artists' groups had drawn up manifestos to demand that Rivera be able to complete his mural.

In December 1933, Rockefeller Center developer John R. Todd proposed that Man at the Crossroads be moved to MoMA, and suggested that Rivera could be re-hired to finish the mural. Rockefeller Center Inc. agreed to this proposal, but it was never carried out because the Rockefeller Center's management had not permitted Rivera's team to lay the plaster onto a specially built metal substructure which had been developed by Rivera and his principal assistant Clifford Wight so that Rivera's frescoes could be removed from the buildings they decorated if necessary. The mural remained covered until February 1934, when workmen peeled the mural off the wall. Rivera said that the mural's destruction "will advance the cause of the labor revolution", while Rockefeller Center Inc. simply issued a two-sentence press release saying that the walls had been replastered, resulting in the mural's demolition.

=== Reactions ===
The destruction caused widespread controversy, with many artists vowing to boycott any future exhibitions or commissions at Rockefeller Center. Ralph Stackpole and Bernard Zakheim created paintings in which figures held up newspapers with headlines alluding to the Man at the Crossroads controversy. The communist New Workers School in Manhattan was one of the entities that protested the destruction of Man at the Crossroads. Its leader Bertram Wolfe was one of Rivera's associates and would later become his biographer. Rivera painted 21 frescoes and gave them to the school as a gift for their protests. The protests largely stopped when Robertson released Rivera's previous correspondence about preferring the mural's destruction.

== Aftermath ==
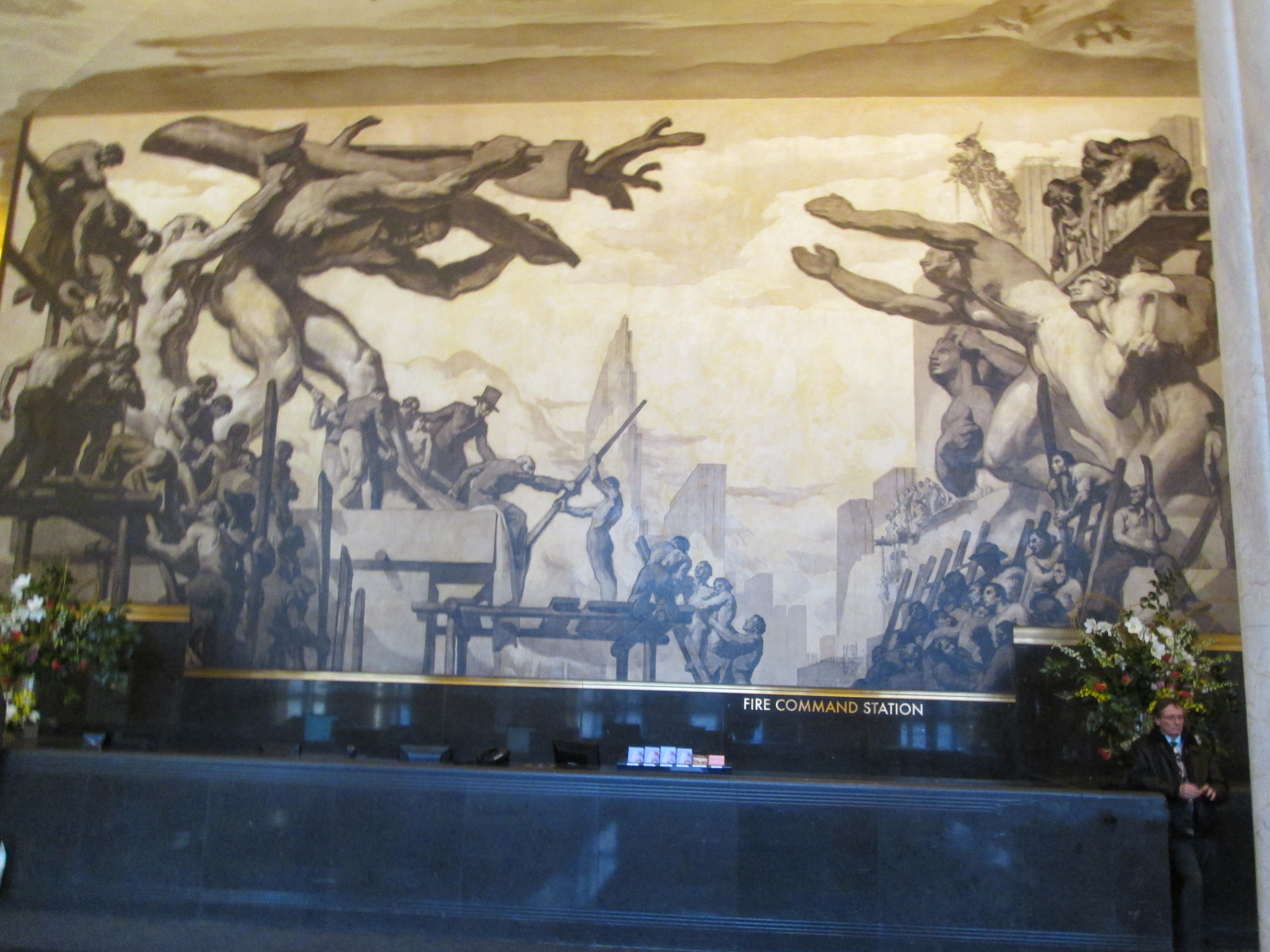
Information desk panel, American Progress, the Triumph of Man's Accomplishments Through Physical and Mental Labor, by Josep Maria Sert, the mural that replaced Man at the Crossroads

Despite the disagreement over Man at the Crossroads, Nelson Rockefeller still admired Rivera's work, and the two had an amicable relationship. Years afterward, he would collect paintings and loan them to Rivera's art shows. However, according to Daniel Okrent, his mother felt "betrayed" by Rivera, and they were not known to see each other again after the dispute had subsided. As a result of the controversy, John Rockefeller saw to it that no artwork would be commissioned for Rockefeller Center without his explicit approval. As for Rivera, Bertram Wolfe wrote that the artist commissioned paintings for movements that opposed the Rockefellers' "continued rule".

After Man at the Crossroads was demolished, Brangwyn was asked to exclude Jesus Christ from his own mural in the RCA Building's lobby, which depicted the Sermon on the Mount. John R. Todd reportedly made the request because Christ could have been depicted in many different ways, but unlike with Man at the Crossroads, there was very little controversy. Brangwyn wrote to John Rockefeller to ask for reconsideration of this request. Brangwyn's mural, completed in December 1933, ultimately featured a depiction of Christ with his back turned. At the mural's unveiling, Todd said that Rockefeller Center management had not cajoled Brangwyn in any way.

Meanwhile, replacements for Man at the Crossroads were being considered, and Rockefeller Center Inc. approached many artists for possible offers. Initially, Picasso showed interest in the commission, but Todd declined the offer because Picasso refused to show a preview of what he was going to paint, and because Picasso would not negotiate from his stated price of $32,000. In 1937, Sert agreed to paint the replacement mural for $27,000. The mural, titled American Progress, depicts a vast allegorical scene of men constructing modern America, and contains figures of Abraham Lincoln, Mahatma Gandhi, and Ralph Waldo Emerson. American Progress wraps around the west wall of 30 Rockefeller Plaza's Grand Lobby.

According to American Heritage magazine, the controversy influenced Franklin D. Roosevelt’s reaction to the idea of a Federal Art Project and similar New Deal-funded public art initiatives: “Commenting on the suggestion that the federal government should undertake a relief program for unemployed artists, Roosevelt expressed some misgiving: he didn't want, he told a friend in 1933, ‘a lot of young enthusiasts painting Lenin's head on the Justice Building.’“ The New Deal art programs were ultimately funded and persisted until the height of World War II, and in the end, “The New Deal administration did its best to give American artists easy rein, recognizing that freedom and originality are inseparable. There were exceptional cases, especially in connection with over a thousand murals executed under Treasury Department auspices for United States post offices across the country; but in general the absence of censorship was remarkable.”

== Man, Controller of the Universe ==
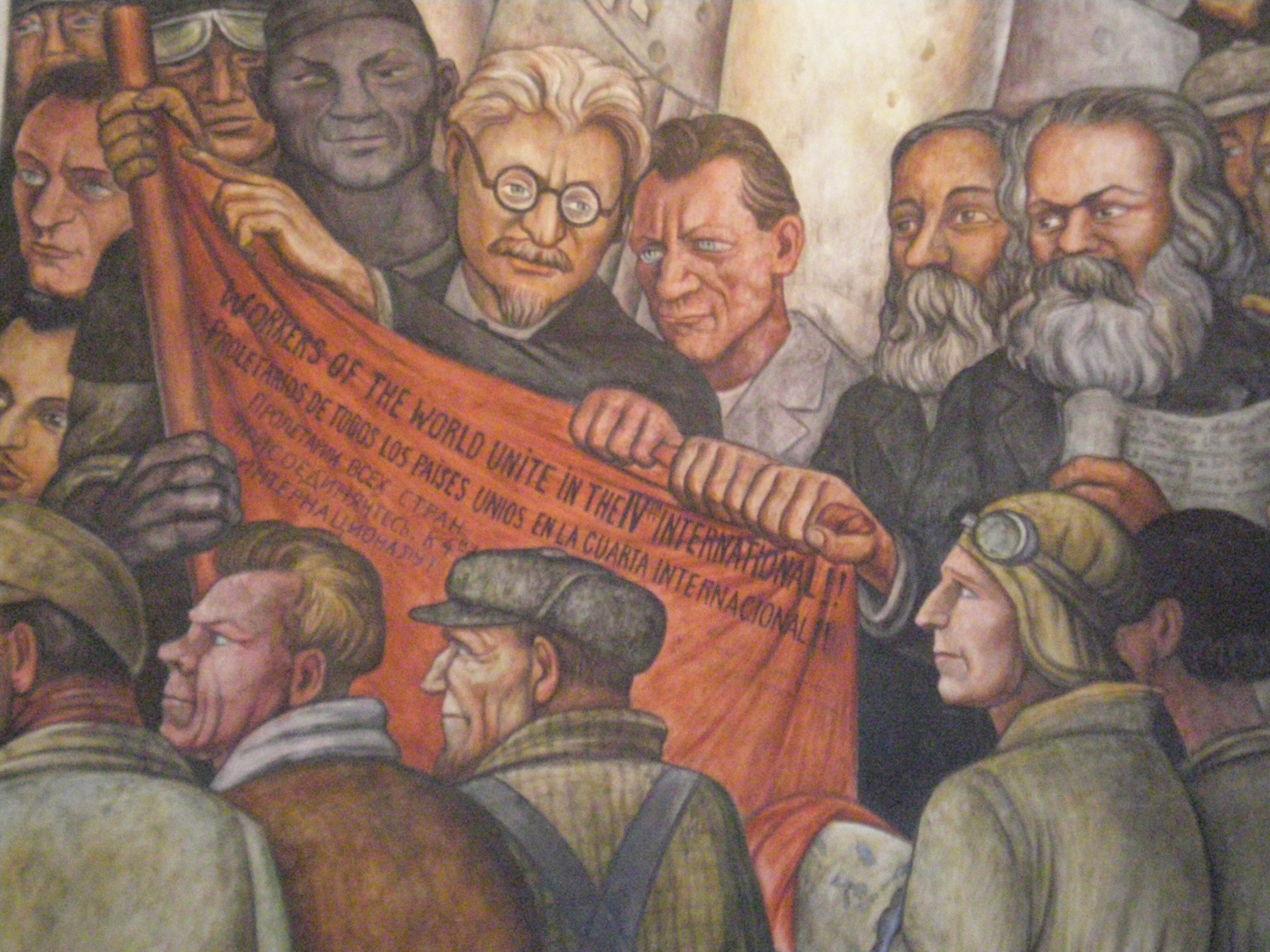
Detail of Man, Controller of the Universe, fresco at Palacio de Bellas Artes showing Leon Trotsky, Friedrich Engels, and Karl Marx

Concerned that Nelson Rockefeller would destroy the work, Rivera had asked Lucienne Bloch to take photographs of the mural before it could be destroyed. In late 1933, Rivera went to Mexico City and persuaded the Mexican government to let him repaint the mural on a blank wall at the Palacio de Bellas Artes. In his biography of Rivera, Bertram Wolfe stated that the artist did not care for the location of the mural this time around. Rather, Wolfe wrote, Rivera had been "looking for a public place where he could let men see what kind of painting it was that these 'patrons of the arts' had chosen to destroy".

Using the photographs as a reference, Rivera repainted the mural, though at a smaller scale, where it was renamed Man, Controller of the Universe. The composition was almost identical, but the central figure was moved slightly to be aligned with the supporting mast of the cylindrical telescope above him. The new version includes a portrait of Leon Trotsky (then exiled in Mexico) alongside Karl Marx and Friedrich Engels at the right. Others appear at the left, including Charles Darwin. Beside Darwin is John Rockefeller Jr, a lifelong teetotaler, drinking in a nightclub with a woman. Above their heads is a dish of syphilis bacteria.

== Cultural significance ==
The Rockefeller–Rivera dispute has become an emblem of the relationship of politics, aesthetics, creative freedom and economic power. Some works dramatized the incident, and a few went so far as to lampoon it. The American poet Archibald MacLeish's 1933 collection Frescoes for Mr. Rockefeller's City was inspired by the incident. It included six poems about the mural in which both Nelson Rockefeller and Rivera were criticized. The New Yorker published E. B. White's poem "I paint what I see: A ballad of artistic integrity", an imaginary debate between Nelson Rockefeller and Rivera, on May 20, 1933. The incident has also been dramatized in the American films Cradle Will Rock (1999) and Frida (2002), both set in the 1930s.

Other works focused specifically on Nelson Rockefeller's and Diego Rivera's conduct during the dispute over Man at the Crossroads. In her 1983 biography Frida, Hayden Herrera mentions that Kahlo wrote, "one could fight against [the Rockefellers] without being stabbed in the back". This referred to Rockefeller and Rivera's continued relationship even after the controversy had passed. Cary Reich writes in The Life of Nelson A. Rockefeller that the controversy was an instance of Nelson's "princely tendency [...] to have surrogates handle his dirty work".

The Simpsons parodied Rivera's commission in the Season 32 episode "Now Museum, Now You Don't."

== See also ==
- List of works by Diego Rivera
- Life of Washington, mural by Viktor Arnautoff
- Freedom for Humanity, mural by Mear One
- América Tropical, mural by David Siqueiros
- LAPD Red Squad raid on John Reed Club art show
- "Now Museum, Now You Don't", an episode of The Simpsons where the mural's commissioning and destruction is loosely retold

== Sources ==
- Aguilar-Moreno, Manuel; Cabrera, Erika (2011). Diego Rivera: A Biography: A Biography. Greenwood Biographies. ABC-CLIO. ISBN 978-0-313-35407-6.
- Balfour, Alan (1978). Rockefeller Center: Architecture as Theater. McGraw-Hill, Inc. ISBN 978-0-070-03480-8.
- Reich, Cary (1996). The Life of Nelson A. Rockefeller: Worlds to Conquer, 1908–1958. New York: Doubleday. ISBN 978-0-385-24696-5.
- Okrent, Daniel (2003). Great Fortune: The Epic of Rockefeller Center. Penguin Books. ISBN 978-0142001776.
- Paquette, Catha (2017). At the Crossroads: Diego Rivera and his Patrons at MoMA, Rockefeller Center, and the Palace of Fine Arts. Austin: University of Texas Press. ISBN 978-1477311004.
- Roussel, Christine (May 17, 2006). The Art of Rockefeller Center. New York: W.W. Norton & Company. ISBN 978-0-3930-6082-9.
- Smith, Richard Norton (2014). On His Own Terms: A Life of Nelson Rockefeller. Random House. ISBN 978-0-375-50580-5.
- Wolfe, Bertram David (1943). Diego Rivera, his life and times. Alfred A. Knopf. ASIN B000RY5E6Y.
