= Mighty Times =

Mighty Times can refer to:

- Mighty Times: The Legacy of Rosa Parks, a 2002 documentary film directed by Robert Houston
- Mighty Times: The Children's March, a 2004 documentary film, also directed by Robert Houston
