= A Killing Affair =

A Killing Affair may refer to:

- A Killing Affair (1977 film), a television crime drama film starring Elizabeth Montgomery and O. J. Simpson
- A Killing Affair (1986 film), a drama film starring Peter Weller
