= This Charming Man (film) =

2002 film

- Directed by: Martin Strange-Hansen
- Written by: Flemming Klem; Martin Strange-Hansen
- Produced by: Mie Andreasen; Kim Magnusson; Tivi Magnusson
- Starring: Martin Buch; Camilla Bendix
- Cinematography: Kim Hattesen
- Edited by: Mahi Rahgozar
- Release date: 2 October 2002
- Running time: 30 minutes
- Country: Denmark
- Language: Danish

This Charming Man (Danish: Der Er En Yndig Mand) is a 2002 Danish short comedy film directed by Martin Strange-Hansen. It won an Oscar in 2003 for Best Short Subject.

== Cast ==
- Martin Buch as Lars Hansen; El Hassan
- Camilla Bendix as Ida
- Farshad Kholghi as Omid
- Martin Hestbæk as Niels
- Michel Castenholt as Pelle
- Niels Martin Eriksen as Magnus
- Anette Støvelbæk as Receptionist Arbejdsformidlingen
- Charlotte Munksgaard as Amanda Pedersen
- Benjamin Boe Rasmussen as Nabo #1
- Thomas Baldus as Nabo #2
- Cecilie Thomsen as Guide på Kronborg
