= Robert Houston (actor) =

American actor and director

- Born: 1955 (age 70–71); California, U.S.
- Other name: Robert Huston
- Occupations: Film actor, director
- Known for: The Hills Have Eyes (1977); Mighty Times: The Children's March (2004)
- Awards: Academy Award for Best Documentary Short Film (2005); Daytime Emmy Award for Outstanding Children's Special (2005)

Robert "Bobby" Houston (born 1955) is an American filmmaker and actor. He made his acting debut in The Hills Have Eyes (1977) before becoming a film director and screenwriter. His films include Shogun Assassin (1980) and Bad Manners (1984). Later in his career, Houston became a successful documentarian. He won an Emmy Award for the film Mighty Times: The Legacy of Rosa Parks (2002) and an Academy Award for the film Mighty Times: The Children's March (2004) in 2005.

== Life and career ==
Houston first came to prominence with his performance of the character Bobby in Wes Craven's 1977 horror film The Hills Have Eyes. He would reprise his role in the sequel, The Hills Have Eyes Part II (1984).

In June 1977, Houston was recruited by photographer Christopher Makos to model nude for Pop artist Andy Warhol at his Factory in New York. Warhol created a silkscreen painting based on a Polaroid photo of Houston doing a handstand for his Torsos series. In the book The Andy Warhol Diaries, Warhol mentioned in a November 7, 1977, diary entry that Houston was writing a movie he had assigned to him about "kids who commit suicide."

Houston and film producer David Weisman acquired the rights for the film Baby Cart at the River Styx, which had been adapted from the Lone Wolf & Cub Japanese action film. They re-edited, re-scored, and co-wrote a script for the English-dubbed film they retitled Shogun Assassin (1980). Houston also wrote and directed several independent films in the 1980s, including the teen comedy Bad Manners (1984).

Houston is also the author of the novel Monday, Tuesday, Wednesday, which served as the basis for the 1986 film A Killing Affair.

Houston studied documentary filmmaking at Harvard University in Cambridge, Massachusetts before moving to Los Angeles. He transitioned from writing to directing until his partner died of AIDS in 1995. He then opened up a bookstore in Ojai, California, and to finance the store he would direct documentaries.

Houston and his partner Robert Hudson formed their own company, Tell The Truth Pictures, to promote and distribute the documentary film Rock The Boat (1998). It had screened at film festivals titled The Human Race. The film follows a crew of HIV+ sailors who enter the Trans-Pacific Yacht Race from Los Angeles to Hawaii.

He would go on to direct Mighty Times: The Legacy of Rosa Parks (2002) and Mighty Times: The Children's March (2004). Both films were nominated for an Academy Award for Best Documentary Short Film, which the latter won in 2005. The Legacy of Rosa Parks won the Daytime Emmy Award for Outstanding Children's Special after airing on HBO in 2005.

After he was fired from HBO, he moved to the Berkshires. There he met his current partner Eric Shamie, owner of Moon in the Pond Farm in Sheffield, Massachusetts. Houston started buying homes and fixing them up. He also developed The Green Houses, a sustainable co-housing community, and opened Scout House, a boutique in Great Barrington, Massachusetts.

== Awards ==
Houston won an Academy Award for the documentary film Mighty Times: The Children's March (2004) in the category Documentary Short Film at the 77th Academy Awards in 2005.

== Filmography ==
Year	Title	Actor	Director	Writer	Distribution	Note
1977	The Hills Have Eyes	Yes	No	No	Vanguard	credited at Robert Huston
1979	Cheerleaders Wild Weekend	Yes	No	No		
1979	1941	Yes	No	No	Universal Pictures	
1980	Shogun Assassin	No	Yes	Yes	New World Pictures	
1984	Bad Manners	No	Yes	Yes	New World Pictures	credited as Bobby Houston
1984	The Hills Have Eyes Part II	Yes	No	No	Castle Hill Productions	
1986	A Killing Affair	No	No	Yes	Prism Entertainment	based on a novel by Houston
1998	Rock The Boat	No	Yes	Yes		documentary
2002	Mighty Times: The Legacy of Rosa Parks	No	Yes	Yes	Teaching Tolerance	documentary short
2004	Mighty Times: The Children's March	No	Yes	Yes	HBO	documentary short

== Bibliography ==
- Monday, Tuesday, Wednesday (novel)
