= Hania Robledo =

Art director

- Other name: Rebeca Hania Robledo Richards
- Occupation: Art director
- Years active: 1998-present

Hania Robledo is an art director.

She was nominated at the 75th Academy Awards in the category of Best Art Direction for her work on the film Frida. Her nomination was shared with Felipe Fernández del Paso.

== Selected filmography ==
- The Mask of Zorro (1998)
- Frida (2002)
- Nacho Libre (2006)
- Beverly Hills Chihuahua (2008)
- Vantage Point (2008)
- Elysium (2013)
