= Frieda and Diego Rivera =

1931 painting by Frida Kahlo

- Frieda y Diego Rivera (Spanish)
- Artist: Frida Kahlo
- Year: 1931
- Medium: Oil on canvas
- Movement: Naïve art; Surrealism
- Dimensions: 100.01 cm × 78.74 cm (39.37 in × 31.00 in)
- Location: San Francisco Museum of Modern Art, San Francisco

Frieda and Diego Rivera (Frieda y Diego Rivera in Spanish) is a 1931 oil painting by Mexican artist Frida Kahlo. This portrait was created two years after Frida Kahlo and Diego Rivera married, and is widely considered a wedding portrait.

The painting shows Kahlo standing next to her husband and fellow artist, Rivera. Rivera, portrayed as a painter, holds a palette and four brushes in his right hand while Kahlo tilts her head towards him. Both are looking out toward the viewer, unsmiling. Kahlo holds her bright red shawl with her left hand. Rivera and Kahlo hold hands in the center of the portrait. Rivera is physically much larger than Kahlo. The pigeon or dove at the upper right carries a banner that reads: "Aquí nos veis, a mí, Frida Kahlo, junto con mi amado esposo Diego Rivera. Pinté estos retratos en la bella ciudad de San Francisco, California, para nuestro amigo Mr. Albert Bender y fue en el mes de abril del año 1931" ("Here you see us, me Frieda Kahlo, with my dearest husband Diego Rivera. I painted these pictures in the delightful city of San Francisco California for our companion Mr. Albert Bender, and it was in the month of April of the year 1931.”) The work had been commissioned by Albert M. Bender, an art collector and supporter of Rivera.

There are many interpretations of the work. Hayden Herrera, author of Frida: A Biography of Frida Kahlo (1983), interprets the work simply as Kahlo depicting herself as the husband of the great artist, Rivera. Other authors, such as Margaret Lindauer, investigate the larger context in which the work was created. The banner is supportive of Lindauer's interpretation because it places Kahlo in the producer/professional artist role.

In 1936 Bender gave the painting to the San Francisco Museum of Modern Art (SFMOMA) in San Francisco, California, where it forms part of the permanent collection and is generally on public display.

== See also ==
- List of paintings by Frida Kahlo
