= Mighty Times: The Children's March =

2004 American documentary film by Robert Houston

- Film poster
- Directed by: Robert Houston and Robert Hudson
- Produced by: Robert Hudson
- Cinematography: Geoffrey George
- Edited by: Mark H. Brewer; Sean P. Keenan
- Music by: Don Davis
- Production company: Southern Poverty Law Center
- Distributed by: HBO
- Release date: 2004
- Running time: 40 minutes
- Country: United States
- Language: English

Mighty Times: The Children's March is a 2004 American short documentary film about the Birmingham, Alabama civil rights marches in the 1960s, highlighting the bravery of young activists involved in the 1963 Children's Crusade. It was directed by Robert Houston and produced by Robert Hudson. In 2005, the film won an Oscar at the 77th Academy Awards for Documentary Short Subject. The film was co-produced by the Southern Poverty Law Center and HBO.

== Cast ==
- Dominiqua Alexis as Interviewed Protester (as Dominiqua Lint)
- Rico E. Anderson as D.J. Shelley "The Playboy" Stewart
- Josh Evans as Police Interrogator / Firefighter
- Kali Hawk as Lenore, Protester on the news
- Jessica Joy Kemock as Townsperson
- Tony Otto as Birmingham Police Officer
- Jeremy Rodriguez as Joe
- Rick Sharp as Jail Interrogator reenactment
- Stephen Keber as Bull Connor

== See also ==
- Civil rights movement in popular culture
- Birmingham campaign
