= A Killing Affair (1986 film) =

- Theatrical release poster
- Directed by: David Saperstein
- Written by: David Saperstein
- Based on: Monday, Tuesday, Wednesday by Robert Houston
- Produced by: Peter R. McIntosh; Michael Rauch
- Starring: Peter Weller; Kathy Baker; John Glover; Bill Smitrovich
- Cinematography: Dominique Chapuis
- Edited by: Patrick McMahon
- Music by: John Barry
- Distributed by: Hemdale Film Corporation; Prism Entertainment
- Release date: July 15, 1988
- Running time: 100 minutes
- Country: United States
- Language: English
- Budget: $2.5 to $5 million
- Box office: $35,000

A Killing Affair is a 1986 American crime drama film starring Peter Weller, Kathy Baker, John Glover, and Bill Smitrovich. The film was written and directed by David Saperstein, based on the novel Monday, Tuesday, Wednesday by Robert Houston.

== Plot ==
During World War II, outsider Baston Morris comes to a tiny town looking for work at the local mill. He meets up with the town's evil employer, Pink Gresham, who abuses the men and has affairs with the women. Pink toys with Baston's plight but keeps the upper hand with his pistol and chases Baston away.

Baston then meets Pink's wife, Maggie, and spins a tale of her husband's philandering and Pink's personal involvement with Baston's affairs at his hometown in the next county.

The subplot contains stories of Maggie's brother, Shep Sheppard, who is a fundamentalist preacher that has followed his father's misogynistic ways. Sheppard sides with Pink when it comes to laying down the law, and a hunt ensues for Baston after stories are revealed of him being an axe murderer.

== Cast ==
- Peter Weller as Baston Morris
- Kathy Baker as Maggie Gresham
- John Glover as Sheb Sheppard
- Bill Smitrovich as Pink Gresham
- Rhetta Hughes as Vinia
- Amy Fields as Bessie Gresham

== Production ==
This film was based on the novel Monday, Tuesday, Wednesday by Robert Houston.

It was filmed in Juliette, Georgia. The film takes place in West Virginia.

Despite being completed in 1985, the film did not find a distributor in the US until the following year and was not released until 1988. The film was released in the UK as My Sister's Keeper.
