= Clancy Sigal =

American novelist (1926–2017)

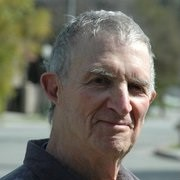
- Sigal in 2002
- Born: September 6, 1926; Chicago, Illinois
- Died: July 16, 2017 (aged 90); Los Angeles, California
- Education: University of California, Los Angeles
- Occupations: Journalist; Screenwriter; Novelist
- Spouse: Janice Tidwell
- Children: 1
- Awards: PEN Lifetime Achievement Award; National Book Award nominee, Going Away
- Website: ClancySigal.com

Clancy Sigal (September 6, 1926 – July 16, 2017) was an American writer, and the author of dozens of essays and seven books, the best-known of which is the autobiographical novel Going Away (1961).

== Early life and education ==
Sigal was born in Chicago, Illinois, to a poor family. His father, Leo Sigal, and mother, Jennie Persily, were both labor organizers; He "acquired his chutzpah and resilience in 30s Chicago," Kim Howells wrote in The Guardian, "raised by his tough Jewish mother in a neighborhood blighted by gangsters, poverty and violence." He later wrote a book about his mother, A Woman of Uncertain Character (2007). There he describes joining the Communist Party at 15. Marc Cooper, reviewing the book for the Los Angeles Times, explained that "Nothing, he figured, could be a greater affront to Jennie, who was an ardent socialist but an even more ardent anti-Communist." During World War II, "The army saved my life," he later wrote. The high point of his time as a soldier in Occupied Germany, he later said, came when "I went AWOL to the Nuremberg War Crimes trial bent on shooting Hermann Goering." After the war he worked as an organizer in Detroit for the auto workers' union, but was expelled in a purge of communists and fellow travelers. He then moved to Los Angeles and enrolled at the University of California, Los Angeles (UCLA) under the G.I. Bill; he was managing editor of the student newspaper, the Daily Bruin. His "drinking buddies," he later wrote, "included the later Watergate conspirators, Bob Haldeman and John Ehrlichman, the latter of whom reported me regularly to the FBI."

== Career ==
After graduating from UCLA in 1950, he got a job at Columbia Pictures, but was fired by Columbia boss Harry Cohn for making copies of radical leaflets on studio equipment (he dropped the leaflets over Los Angeles from an airplane). He then went to work as a Hollywood agent, during the blacklist years of the 1950s—the basis of his memoir Black Sunset. He was subpoenaed by the House Committee on Un-American Activities, he wrote in that book, but his hearing was abruptly cancelled. Soon after, in 1957, he left Los Angeles and the U.S.—the story he told in Going Away—and settled in Great Britain.

In 1961 he published Going Away. The book is set in 1956 and tells the story of the author's drive from Los Angeles to New York "to look at America and figure out why it isn't my country any longer." It won a National Book Award nomination. John Leonard later wrote in the New York Times: "Better than any other document I know, Going Away identified, embodied and re‐created the postwar American radical experience. It was as if On the Road had been written by somebody with brains.... (Sigal's) intelligence is always ticking. His ear is superb. His sympathies are promiscuous. His sin is enthusiasm."

In London he lived with Doris Lessing, with whom he had a four-year affair. She portrayed him as "Saul Green" in The Golden Notebook. He later wrote about those years in The Secret Defector. The New York Times Book Review declared about that book, "Lenin and Stalin may have fallen, but Mr. Sigal still stands, dispensing his memories of the left with wit, irony and sheer pratfall comedy." In London he ran an underground operation for U.S. Army deserters, which he later wrote about for the London Review of Books. Sigal was involved with efforts to assist US draft resistors, including Richard Haygood, and helped coordinate accommodation for American exiles in Britain. He worked with groups such as Group 68: Americans in Britain for United States Withdrawal from Southeast Asia and the Union of American Exiles in Britain (UAEB) to coordinate these resistance efforts. He was also part of the Philadelphia Association experiment with R. D. Laing at Kingsley Hall, drawing on his experiences there for his satirical novel Zone of the Interior. The novel could not find a British publisher in the 1970s willing to risk the libel laws.

Sigal was The Observer correspondent for the 1984 Los Angeles Olympic Games, and after 30 years in England decided to return to Los Angeles after falling in love there with writer Janice Tidwell. They soon married, and became a screenwriting team. Together they wrote the screenplay for the Oscar-winning 2002 Salma Hayek film Frida. In 2016 he published his Hollywood memoir, Black Sunset: Hollywood Sex, Lies, Glamour, Betrayal and Raging Egos. "The beauty of Black Sunset," Paul Buhle wrote in the Los Angeles Review of Books, "will be found in the details, lovingly or painfully described, page after page . . . Clancy Sigal brings the innocent and guilty back, once more, at close range, and proves himself the liveliest of literary nonagenarians in the process."

His final book, The London Lover: My Weekend that Lasted Thirty Years, a memoir of his London years, was published in 2018. A feature documentary on his life by Kurt Jacobsen and Warren Leming entitled Clancy Sigal: Lord of the Gadflies, premiered at the Santa Fe Film Festival in February 2023 and since screened at several other festivals.

== Awards ==
- National Book Award, runner up for Going Away
- 2007: PEN Center USA, Lifetime Achievement Award presented by Gore Vidal

== Personal life ==
Sigal's first marriage, to Margaret Walters in 1980, ended in divorce in 1989. In 1995, Sigal had a son, Joseph, with his second wife, Janice Tidwell. Sigal died July 16, 2017, in Los Angeles, California, of congestive heart failure.

== Work and publications ==
=== Books ===
- Weekend in Dinlock, Houghton Mifflin, 1960.
- Going Away: A Report, A Memoir. Houghton Mifflin, 1961. National Book Award nominee.
- Zone of the Interior, New York: Thomas W. Crowell, 1976. Published in the UK by Pomona Press, 2005. ISBN 1-904590-10-1
- The Secret Defector, New York: HarperCollins, 1992
- A Woman of Uncertain Character: The amorous and radical adventures of my mother Jennie (who always wanted to be a respectable Jewish mom) by her bastard son (2006) New York: Carroll & Graf. ISBN 0-7867-1748-3
- Hemingway Lives! Why Reading Ernest Hemingway Matters Today, OR Books, 2013
- Black Sunset: Hollywood Sex, Lies, Glamour, Betrayal and Raging Egos Soft Skull Press, 2016
- The London Lover: My Weekend that Lasted Thirty Years Bloomsbury, 2018. (ISBN 9781408885802)

=== Journalism, Essays, Stories, Reviews ===
- Essays and articles for The Guardian (64 items)
- Reviews for The New York Review of Books
- Writings for the Paris Review
- Writings for the Huffington Post

=== Films ===
- Frida (2002) screenwriting credit
- In Love and War (1996) screenwriting credit
- The Trap: What Happened to Our Dream of Freedom? (2007) BBC Documentary. acting credit: "as himself."
- Nelson Algren: The End is Nothing, the Road is All. (2015) Documentary. acting credit: "as himself."
- Clancy Sigal: Lord of the Gadflies ("as himself")
