= Frida (2002 film) =

American biographical film directed by Julie Taymor

- Promotional poster
- Directed by: Julie Taymor
- Screenplay by: Clancy Sigal; Diane Lake; Gregory Nava; Anna Thomas
- Based on: Frida: A Biography of Frida Kahlo by Hayden Herrera
- Produced by: Sarah Green; Salma Hayek; Jay Polstein; Lizz Speed; Nancy Hardin; Lindsay Flickinger; Roberto Sneider
- Starring: Salma Hayek; Alfred Molina; Geoffrey Rush; Valeria Golino; Mía Maestro; Roger Rees
- Cinematography: Rodrigo Prieto
- Edited by: Françoise Bonnot
- Music by: Elliot Goldenthal
- Production company: Ventanarosa
- Distributed by: Miramax Films
- Release dates: August 29, 2002 (Venice); October 25, 2002 (United States)
- Running time: 123 minutes
- Country: United States
- Languages: English; Spanish; French; Russian
- Budget: $12 million
- Box office: $56.3 million

Frida is a 2002 American biographical film directed by Julie Taymor, about the Mexican surrealist artist Frida Kahlo. Salma Hayek stars as Kahlo and Alfred Molina plays her husband Diego Rivera. The film was adapted by Clancy Sigal, Diane Lake, Gregory Nava, Anna Thomas, and unofficially by Edward Norton from a 1983 biography of Kahlo by Hayden Herrera.

Frida premiered at the 59th Venice International Film Festival on August 29, 2002. Upon its release in U.S. theaters by Miramax Films on October 25, the film received generally positive reviews from critics, and grossed $56.3 million on a $12 million production budget. At the 75th Academy Awards, Frida received six nominations, winning for Best Makeup and Best Original Score. Hayek's universally acclaimed performance garnered Best Actress nominations at the Oscars, the Golden Globes, the Baftas and the SAG Awards.

In 2025, it was selected for preservation in the United States National Film Registry by the Library of Congress as being "culturally, historically or aesthetically significant."

== Plot ==
In 1925, Frida Kahlo suffers a traumatic accident at the age of 18 on board a wooden-bodied bus that collides with a streetcar. Impaled by a metal pole, she sustains injuries that will plague her for the rest of her life. To help her through convalescence, her father brings her a canvas to paint on.

Once regaining the ability to walk with a cane, Frida visits muralist Diego Rivera, demanding an honest critique of her paintings. Rivera falls in love with her work, and they begin a dysfunctional relationship. When he proposes, she tells him she expects loyalty from him, if not fidelity. Throughout the marriage, Rivera has affairs with a wide array of women. At the same time, the bisexual Kahlo takes on male and female lovers, including, in one case, the same woman as Rivera.

The couple travels to NYC in 1934, so Rivera may paint the mural Man at the Crossroads, at the behest of the Rockefeller family, inside Rockefeller Center. While living in the US, Kahlo suffers a miscarriage and travels back to Mexico for her mother's funeral. Rivera refuses to compromise his communist vision of the work to the needs of the patron, Nelson Rockefeller; as a result, the mural is destroyed. The pair return to Mexico, with Rivera more reluctant.

Kahlo's sister, Cristina, moves in with them at their San Ángel studio home as Rivera's assistant. Soon afterward, Kahlo discovers Rivera is sleeping with her. Leaving him, she subsequently sinks into alcoholism after moving back to her family's Coyoacán home.

They reunite during a Día de los Muertos celebration where he asks her to welcome and house Leon Trotsky, who has been granted political asylum in Mexico. Trotsky expresses his love for Kahlo's work during an excursion to Teotihuacan, and they begin an affair. Soon, his wife learns of the affair, forcing the couple to leave the safety of Kahlo's home.

Kahlo leaves for Paris when Diego realizes she was unfaithful to him with Trotsky. Rivera had little problem with Kahlo's other affairs, but Trotsky was too important to be intimately involved with his wife. When she returns to Mexico, he asks for a divorce.

In 1940, Trotsky is assassinated in Mexico City. Initially, Rivera is suspected by police of orchestrating the assassination. When they fail to locate him, Kahlo is arrested. Cristina arrives and escorts her out of prison, explaining that Rivera convinced President Cárdenas to release her.

Kahlo has her toes removed when her doctor notices they have become gangrenous. Rivera remorsefully asks her to remarry him, and she agrees. Kahlo's health worsens, leading to the amputation of a leg and bronchopneumonia, which leaves her bedridden. In 1953, Kahlo's bed is carried from her home to a museum to attend her first solo exhibition in her native country.

== Cast ==
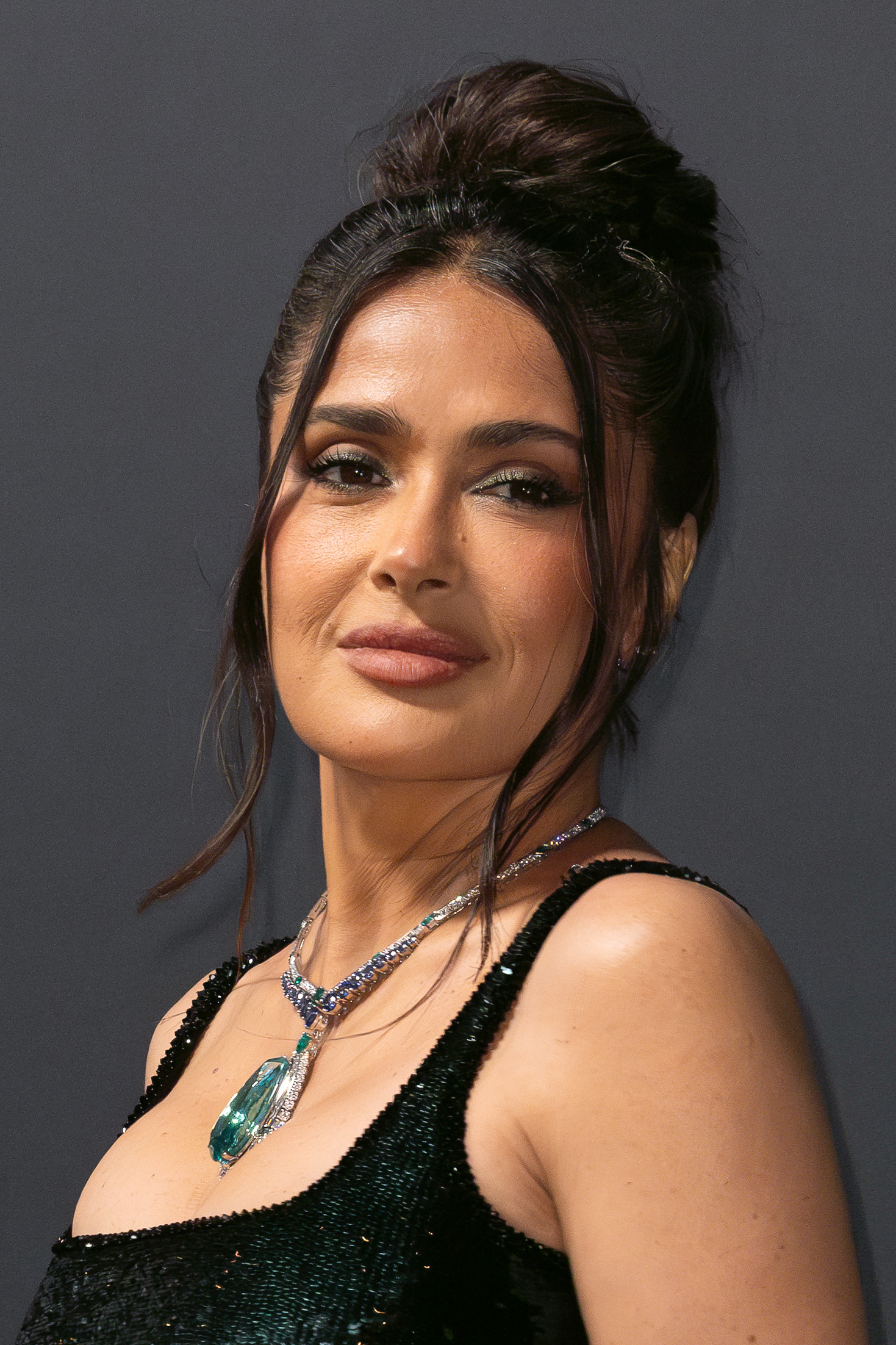
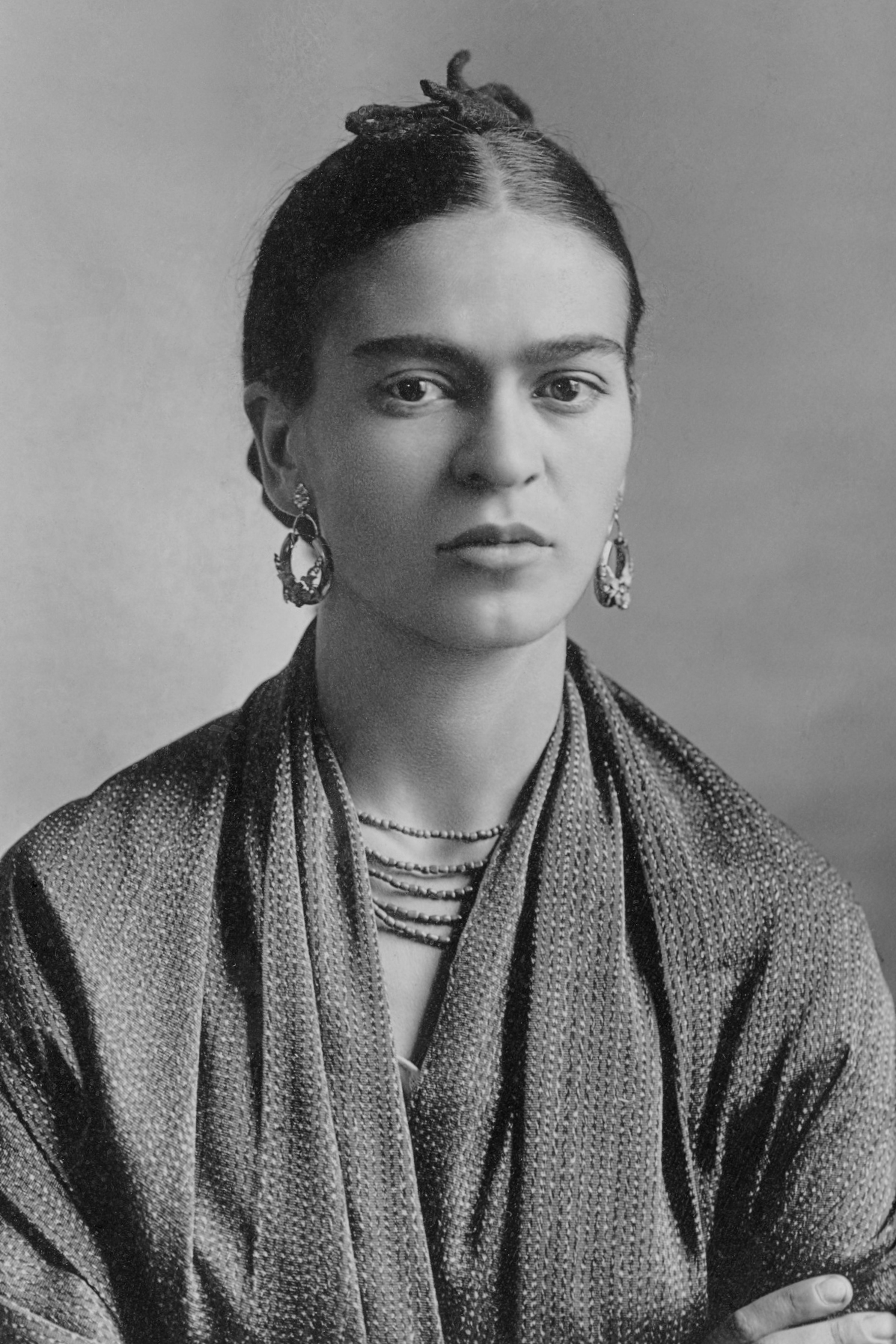
Salma Hayek (left) portrayed Mexican painter Frida Kahlo (right).
- Salma Hayek as Frida Kahlo
- Alfred Molina as Diego Rivera
- Geoffrey Rush as Leon Trotsky
- Mía Maestro as Cristina Kahlo
- Ashley Judd as Tina Modotti
- Antonio Banderas as David Alfaro Siqueiros
- Edward Norton as Nelson Rockefeller
- Diego Luna as Alejandro Gómez Arias
- Margarita Sanz as Natalia Sedova
- Patricia Reyes Spíndola as Matilde Kahlo
- Roger Rees as Guillermo Kahlo
- Valeria Golino as Lupe Marín
- Omar Rodriguez (aka Omar Chagall) as André Breton
- Felipe Fulop as Jean Van Heijenoort
- Saffron Burrows as Gracie
- Karine Plantadit-Bageot as Josephine Baker

== Allusions and paintings ==
The passengers in the bus Kahlo rides in that crashes with a streetcar are based on subjects in the painter's 1929 portrait, The Bus. Other Kahlo paintings either shown directly or depicted in the film by the characters include Frieda and Diego Rivera (1931), What the Water Gave Me (1938), The Two Fridas (1939), The Broken Column (1944), and The Wounded Deer (1946).

The film's stop motion animation sequence (created by The Brothers Quay) depicting the initial stages of Kahlo's recovery at the hospital after the accident is inspired by the Mexican holiday Day of the Dead. The gown Valeria Golino wears at Kahlo's 1953 Mexican solo art exhibition is a replica of the dress that her character, Lupe Marín, wore in Rivera's 1938 portrait of her.

== Production ==
The film version of Frida Kahlo's life was initially championed by Nancy Hardin, a former book editor and Hollywood-based literary agent, turned early "female studio executive", who, in the mid-1980s wished to "make the transition to independent producing." Learning of Hayden Herrera's biography of Kahlo, Hardin saw Kahlo's life as very contemporary, her "story ... an emblematic tale for women torn between marriage and career." Optioning the book in 1988, Hardin "tried to sell it as an epic love story in the tradition of Out of Africa, attracting tentative interest from actresses such as Meryl Streep and Jessica Lange, but receiving rejection from the film studios.

Kahlo's art gained prominence, and "in May 1990 one of Kahlo's self-portraits sold at Sotheby's for $1.5 million, the highest price ever paid at auction for a Latin American painting." Madonna "announced her plans to star in a film based on Frida's life", and Robert De Niro's Tribeca Productions reportedly "envisioned a joint biography of Rivera and Kahlo." In the spring of 1991, director Luis Valdez began production on a New Line feature about Frida Kahlo starring Laura San Giacomo in the lead. San Giacomo's casting received objections due to her non-Hispanic ethnicity, and New Line complied with the protesters' demands, and left the then-titled Frida and Diego in August 1992 citing finances. Hardin's project found itself swamped by similar ones:

When I first tried to sell the project ... there was no interest because nobody had heard of Frida. A few years later, I heard the exact opposite – that there were too many Frida projects in development, and nobody wanted mine.

Valdez was contacted early on by Salma Hayek, then unknown in the U.S., who sent "her [promo] reel to the director and phoned his office", but was ultimately told she was then too young for the role. By 1993, Valdez had retitled the film The Two Fridas with San Giacomo and Ofelia Medina both playing the portraitist. Raúl Juliá was cast as Diego Rivera, but his death further delayed the movie. At the same time, Hardin approached HBO, and with "rising young development executive and producer" Lizz Speed (a former assistant to Sherry Lansing) intended to make a television movie, hopeful that Brian Gibson (director of "What's Love Got to Do With It, the story of Tina Turner" and The Josephine Baker Story) would direct. Casting difficulties proved insurmountable, but Speed joined Hardin in advocating for the project, and after four years in development, the two took the project from HBO to Trimark and producer Jay Polstein (with assistant Darlene Caamaño). At Trimark, Salma Hayek became interested in the role, having "been fascinated by Kahlo's work from the time she was 13 or 14" – although not immediately a fan:

At that age I did not like her work ... I found it ugly and grotesque. But something intrigued me, and the more I learned, the more I started to appreciate her work. There was a lot of passion and depth. Some people see only pain, but I also see irony and humor. I think what draws me to her is what Diego saw in her. She was a fighter. Many things could have diminished her spirit, like the accident or Diego's infidelities. But she wasn't crushed by anything.

Hayek was so determined to play the role that she sought out Dolores Olmedo Patino, longtime-lover of Diego Rivera, and, after his death, administrator to the rights of Frida and Rivera's art, which Rivera had "willed ... to the Mexican people", bequeathing the trust to Olmedo. Hayek personally secured access to Kahlo's paintings from her, and began to assemble a supporting cast, approaching Alfred Molina for the role of Rivera in 1998. According to Molina, "She turned up backstage [of the Broadway play 'Art'] rather sheepishly, and asked if I would like to play Diego". Molina went on to gain 35 pounds to play Rivera. When producer Polstein left Trimark, however, the production faltered again, and Hayek approached Harvey Weinstein and Miramax, and the company purchased the film from Trimark; Julie Taymor came onto the project as director. Meanwhile, in August 2000 it was announced that Jennifer Lopez would star in Valdez's take on the story, The Two Fridas, by then being produced by American Zoetrope. Nonetheless, it was Hayek and Miramax who began production in Spring, 2001 on what was to become simply titled Frida. Edward Norton rewrote the script at least once but was not credited as a writer.

=== Filming ===
Filming took place from April 7 through June 2001 and was shot entirely in Mexico.

Among the on location places shot were three UNESCO world heritage sites: Teotihuacan, Xochimilco, and Puebla's historic centre. Other on location sites include Rivera and Kahlo's Juan O'Gorman-designed San Ángel studio house and the San Ildefonso National Preparatory School. Replicas of the Casa Azul (Kahlo's Coyoacán house) and the RCA Building's lobby were built at Churubusco Studios in Mexico City and shot in Stage 4 there.

For scenes depicting Diego completing a mural, crew members stretched a canvas across a scaffold placed in front of the painter's actual artwork. This "makeshift 'mural'" included sketched outlines and painted portions. The optical "illusion" of a work in progress was achieved through the canvas "flattened" by a camera shooting from a distance and therefore "blending" the edges into the fixed mural.

Salma Hayek wore over fifty costumes as Frida. Some pieces were purchased from street vendors in Mexico City.

=== Sexual misconduct by producer Harvey Weinstein ===
In a December 2017 op-ed for The New York Times, Hayek stated that Weinstein attempted to thwart the making of the film because Hayek had refused to grant him sexual favors and that he had threatened to shut down the film unless Hayek agreed to include a full-frontal nude sex scene with herself and another woman. In response, Weinstein claimed that none of the sexual allegations made by Hayek was accurate and that he did not recall pressuring Hayek "to do a gratuitous sex scene."

== Release ==
On August 29, 2002, Frida made its world premiere opening at the Venice International Film Festival. Frida's American premiere was at the Los Angeles County Museum of Art in Los Angeles on October 14 of that year. It had its Mexican premiere on November 8, 2002, at Mexico City's Palace of Fine Arts.

=== Box office ===
Frida grossed $25.9 million in the United States and Canada and $30.4 million in other countries for a worldwide total of $56.3 million, against a production budget of $12 million. It was initially shown in five theaters and earned $205,996 upon its opening weekend in the United States. The following week the film expanded to forty-seven theaters, earning $1,323,935. By late December 2002, Frida was playing in 283 theaters and had earned over $20 million.

=== Critical reception ===
Review aggregator Rotten Tomatoes reports that 77% of 159 critics have given the film a positive review, with an average rating of 6.88/10. The website's critical consensus reads, "Frida is a passionate, visually striking biopic about the larger-than-life artist." Metacritic, which assigns a score of 1–100 to individual film reviews, gives the film an average rating of 61 based on 38 reviews, indicating "generally favorable reviews".

Stella Papamichael from the BBC gave the film three out of five stars and stated

Julie Taymor's biography of Mexican painter Frida Kahlo connects the dots between art and anguish. The disparity lies in the fact that Frida settles for tickling a fancy where it should be packing a punch. Although involving and sprightly, it offers the kind of guilty pleasure a Fine Arts student might derive from a glossy cartoon strip.

Film critic Roger Ebert awarded Frida three and a half stars and commented: "Sometimes we feel as if the film careens from one colorful event to another without respite, but sometimes it must have seemed to Frida Kahlo as if her life did, too." Ebert thought Taymor and the writers had "obviously struggled with the material", though he called the closing scenes "extraordinary."

The New York Post's Jonathan Foreman praised the score and Taymor's direction, saying that she "captures both the glamorous, deeply cosmopolitan milieu Kahlo and Rivera inhabited, and the importance Mexico had in the '30s for the international left." He added that the odd accents adopted by the likes of Judd and Rush let the authenticity down.

Andrew Pulver from The Guardian gave the film three stars and proclaimed that it is "a substantial film, its story told with economy and clarity."

== Accolades ==
The American Film Institute included Frida in their Movies of the Year 2002, Official Selection. Their rationale was:

Frida is a movie about art that is a work of art in itself. The film's unique visual language takes us into an artist's head and reminds us that art is best enjoyed when it moves, breathes and is painted on a giant canvas, as only the movies can provide.

== Soundtrack ==
- Frida (soundtrack)
