= Hayden Herrera =

Art historian and biographer

- Born: Hayden Philips; November 20, 1940 (age 85); Boston, Massachusetts, USA
- Education: Radcliffe College; BA, 1964, Barnard College; MA, Hunter College; PhD, 1981, CUNY Graduate Center
- Occupation: Author
- Notable work: Frida: A Biography of Frida Kahlo
- Spouse(s): Desmond Heath Phillip Herrera (m. 1961, divorced)
- Relatives: William Phillips

Hayden Herrera (née Philips; born November 20, 1940) is an American author and historian. Her book Frida: A Biography of Frida Kahlo was turned into a movie in 2002 and Herrera's biography Arshile Gorky: His Life and Work was named a finalist for the 2004 Pulitzer Prize for Biography or Autobiography.

== Early life and education ==
Herrera was born on November 20, 1940 to parents Elizabeth and John Phillips and grandfather William Phillips. Growing up in Vermont, she attended North Country School and The Putney School before enrolling at Radcliffe College. After leaving Radcliffe to pursue painting, she married Harvard University alumnus Phillip Herrera in 1961. She returned to schooling and graduated with her Bachelor of Arts from Barnard College in 1964 and her Master's degree from Hunter College.

While pursuing her PhD at the Graduate Center of the City University of New York, Herrera travelled to Mexico City with friends who encouraged her to attend Frida Kahlo's art show. She had not heard of Kahlo before. In 1976, she wrote an article about Kahlo, which she submitted to a publishing agency, and centered her thesis around the artist in 1981.

== Career ==
Following her graduation, Herrera formally published her thesis as her first book titled Frida: A Biography of Frida Kahlo, which was met with positive reviews from critics. She subsequently published two more books in the 1990s; Mary Frank and Matisse: A Portrait, which earned her a 1996 Guggenheim Fellowship. At the turn of the century, her first book was chosen to be adapted into a studio film Frida starring Salma Hayek. It was a breakthrough role for Hayek, who was nominated for Best Actress for the Academy Award, BAFTA Award, Golden Globe Award, and Screen Actors Guild Award. Two years later, her biography Arshile Gorky: His Life and Work was named a finalist for the 2004 Pulitzer Prize for Biography or Autobiography. Following her divorce, she married psychiatrist Desmond Heath and moved to North Salem, New York.

== See also ==
- Women in the art history field
