= Robert Hudson (producer) =

American film director and producer

Robert Hudson (born May 23, 1960, in Seattle, Washington) is an American documentary filmmaker. He won an Academy Award in the category Documentary Short Subject for the film Mighty Times: The Children's March.

== Filmography ==
- Rock the Boat (1998)
- A Place At The Table (2001)
- Mighty Times: The Legacy of Rosa Parks (2002)
- Mighty Times: The Children's March (2004)
