= Mighty Times: The Legacy of Rosa Parks =

2002 film

- Directed by: Robert Houston
- Written by: Robert Houston
- Produced by: Bill Couturié; Dulanie M. Ellis; Robert Hudson
- Cinematography: Geoffrey George
- Edited by: Nancy Barber
- Production company: Tell the Truth Pictures
- Distributed by: Teaching Tolerance
- Release date: 2002
- Running time: 40 minutes
- Country: United States
- Language: English

Mighty Times: The Legacy of Rosa Parks is a 2002 American short documentary film directed by Robert Houston and produced by Robert Hudson about the 1955/56 Montgomery bus boycott led by Rosa Parks.

== Accolades ==
It was nominated for an Academy Award for Best Documentary Short and won the Daytime Emmy Award for Outstanding Children's Special (the latter award earned in 2005 after airing on HBO).

== Cast ==
- Coretta Scott King as herself (archive footage)
- Martin Luther King Jr. as himself (archive footage)
- Nick LaTour as Narrator
- E. D. Nixon as himself (archive footage)
- Rosa Parks as herself (archive footage)

== See also ==
- List of documentary films
- The Rosa Parks Story
- Civil rights movement in popular culture
