= Frida: A Biography of Frida Kahlo =

1983 book by Hayden Herrera

- First edition
- Author: Hayden Herrera
- Cover artist: Frida Kahlo, Self-Portrait with Monkey (1940)
- Language: English
- Genre: Biographical novel
- Publisher: Harper & Row
- Publication date: 1983
- ISBN: 0-06-011843-1

Frida: A Biography of Frida Kahlo is a 1983 book by Hayden Herrera about the life of Mexican artist Frida Kahlo, her art, and her relationship with muralist Diego Rivera.

The book has 25 chapters divided into six parts, as well as photos of Kahlo and her paintings. Within each section, there are biographical details about Kahlo's life, copies of letters that Kahlo wrote, and descriptions and analyses of her paintings.

A major 2002 studio film, Frida, adapted from the book, stars Salma Hayek as Kahlo. A second edition of the book was published in 2002 with a cover inspired by the film.
