= Wilderness Tips =

1991 collection of short stories by Margaret Atwood

- First edition
- Author: Margaret Atwood
- Cover artist: Frida Kahlo, The Wounded Deer, 1946
- Language: English
- Genre: Short story collection
- Publisher: McClelland and Stewart
- Publication date: 1991
- Publication place: Canada
- Media type: Print (hardcover)
- ISBN: 0-7710-0819-8

Wilderness Tips is a collection of short stories by Margaret Atwood, published in 1991 by McClelland and Stewart. It was a finalist for the Governor General's Award. Certain stories were previously published in The New Yorker, Saturday Night, Playboy, Harper's and Vogue.

Several of the stories are fictionalized portrayals of Atwood's contemporaries in Canadian literature. The mysterious poet Selena in "Isis in Darkness" is based on Gwendolyn MacEwen, and the journalist Marcia in "Hack Wednesday" is based on June Callwood. One story, "Uncles", prompted a feud between Atwood and Robert Fulford, who claimed to have been the model for the character Percy Marrow, described in the story as a "peeled potato with a little tuft of fuzz on top".

== Contents ==
- "True Trash"
- "Hairball"
- "Isis in Darkness"
- "The Bog Man"
- "Death by Landscape"
- "Uncles"
- "The Age of Lead"
- "Weight"
- "Wilderness Tips"
- "Hack Wednesday"
