= The Frame (painting) =

Painting by Frida Kahlo

- El marco (Spanish)
- Artist: Frida Kahlo
- Year: 1938
- Type: Oil on aluminum, framed in glass
- Dimensions: 28.5 cm × 20.7 cm (11.2 in × 8.1 in)
- Location: Musée National d'Art Moderne; Paris

The Frame (El marco in Spanish) is a 1938 self-portrait by Frida Kahlo. The painting features Kahlo's self-portrait in oil on a sheet of aluminum framed in glass which she purchased from a market in Oaxaca, Mexico. Although the glass frame is included as part of the painting, the flowers, birds, and other details on the frame were painted prior to being purchased by Kahlo.

The painting is notable as the first work by a 20th-century Mexican artist to be purchased by a major international museum, when it was acquired by the Louvre in 1939. The painting is now shown at the Musée National d'Art Moderne in the Centre Pompidou in Paris. It was the only sale Kahlo made in her Paris exhibition. Upon Kahlo's death in 1954, the New York Times stated that she was "said to have been the first woman artist to sell a picture to the Louvre."

== See also ==
- List of paintings by Frida Kahlo
- The Frida Kahlo Museum (La Casa Azul)
