= The Dream (The Bed) =

1940 self-portrait by Frida Kahlo

- El sueño (La cama) (Spanish)
- Artist: Frida Kahlo
- Year: 1940
- Medium: Oil on canvas
- Movement: Surrealism
- Dimensions: 74 cm × 98 cm (29 in × 39 in)
- Location: Private collection

The Dream (The Bed) (Spanish: El sueño (La cama)) is a 1940 self-portrait by Mexican artist Frida Kahlo.

It shows Kahlo asleep in a wooden bed that appears to float among clouds, wrapped in vines and leaves, while a papier-mâché skeleton wired with sticks of dynamite lies on the canopy above her. Commentators have connected the imagery to Kahlo's chronic pain and long periods of enforced bed rest following a near-fatal bus accident in her youth, and to her preoccupation with the line between sleep and death.

The year it was painted was also marked by her remarriage to Diego Rivera and the assassination of her former lover Leon Trotsky. The auction house, Sotheby's noted that the painting was one of few of its calibre remaining in private hands and emphasized its psychological intensity and signature surrealist imagery.

In November 2025, the painting was sold for $54.7 million at Sotheby's in New York City as the star lot of the Exquisite Corpus evening auction of Surrealist art. The price set a new auction record for a work by a woman artist, surpassing Georgia O'Keeffe's Jimson Weed/White Flower No. 1 (sold for $44.4 million in 2014), and also exceeded Kahlo's own record for a Latin American artist set by Diego y yo in 2021.

The Exquisite Corpus auction featured more than 80 Surrealist works by artists including René Magritte and Salvador Dalí.

The painting had been unseen publicly for nearly three decades until prior to its sale, when it was exhibited in London, Abu Dhabi, Hong Kong, Paris, and New York City. The motif of the bed reflects periods of immobility in her life following a near-fatal bus accident.

== Background ==
Kahlo painted El sueño (La cama) in 1940, a period often described as turbulent in her personal life. The year followed her 1939 divorce from Diego Rivera and coincided with both their remarriage in December 1940 and the assassination of her former companion Leon Trotsky in Mexico City. At the same time, she continued to deal with chronic pain and medical complications stemming from the streetcar accident she suffered at age eighteen, which left her undergoing repeated surgeries and long stretches confined to bed.

The painting belongs to a group of self-portraits from the late 1930s and early 1940s in which Kahlo explored themes of bodily injury, emotional upheaval, and mortality through hybrid imagery that draws on Mexican folk art, Catholic symbolism, and elements associated with Surrealism.

== Description and interpretation ==
The work depicts Kahlo lying on a carved, colonial-style bed that appears to float in a cloudy sky. She is covered by a gold blanket and entwined in leafy vines. Above her rests a skeletal figure on the bed's canopy, its body bound with sticks of dynamite and a lit fuse. The skeleton recalls papier-mâché figures used in popular festivities in Mexico, while the explosive motif introduces a sense of latent danger.

Writers have read the composition as a meditation on the "porous boundary" between sleep and death and as a visualization of Kahlo's fear of dying in her sleep, shaped by years of illness and surgical trauma. The motif of the bed, which recurs throughout Kahlo's work, has been linked to the bed as a literal and symbolic space where she painted, convalesced and imagined alternate realities.

Although the painting is frequently discussed in the context of Surrealism, Kahlo herself resisted the label. In a frequently cited remark, she stated: "I never painted dreams. I painted my own reality."

== Provenance and exhibition history ==
According to Sotheby's, the painting measures approximately 74 × 98 cm (29 × 38.5 in) and was first handled by the Mexico City gallery Galería Misrachi before entering private collections. In 1980 it was sold at Sotheby's in New York for about $51,000, a fraction of its later record price. It subsequently remained in private ownership.

The work was widely exhibited in major Kahlo retrospectives and group shows in the late 20th century, including exhibitions in Mexico, the United States and Europe, before effectively disappearing from public view after the late 1990s. Ahead of the 2025 auction, it was sent on a public preview tour with stops in London, Abu Dhabi, Hong Kong, Paris and New York City, marking its first public display in nearly three decades.

== 2025 auction record ==
Sotheby's offered El sueño (La cama) in its 20 November 2025 Exquisite Corpus evening sale of Surrealist art in New York, where it carried a pre-sale estimate of $40–60 million. After several minutes of bidding, the painting hammered within estimate and achieved a final price of $54.7 million with fees. The buyer was not publicly identified.

The sale set a new auction benchmark for a woman artist, surpassing Georgia O'Keeffe's Jimson Weed/White Flower No. 1, and also reset the auction record for a Latin American artwork, eclipsing the $34.9 million paid for Kahlo's 1949 painting Diego y yo in 2021. Critics and commentators noted that the canvas is one of relatively few Kahlo paintings still in private hands and that its export has prompted debate about the international circulation of works by an artist whose work is considered an artistic monument under Mexican law.

== See also ==
- List of paintings by Frida Kahlo
