= Frida Kahlo =

Mexican painter (1907–1954)

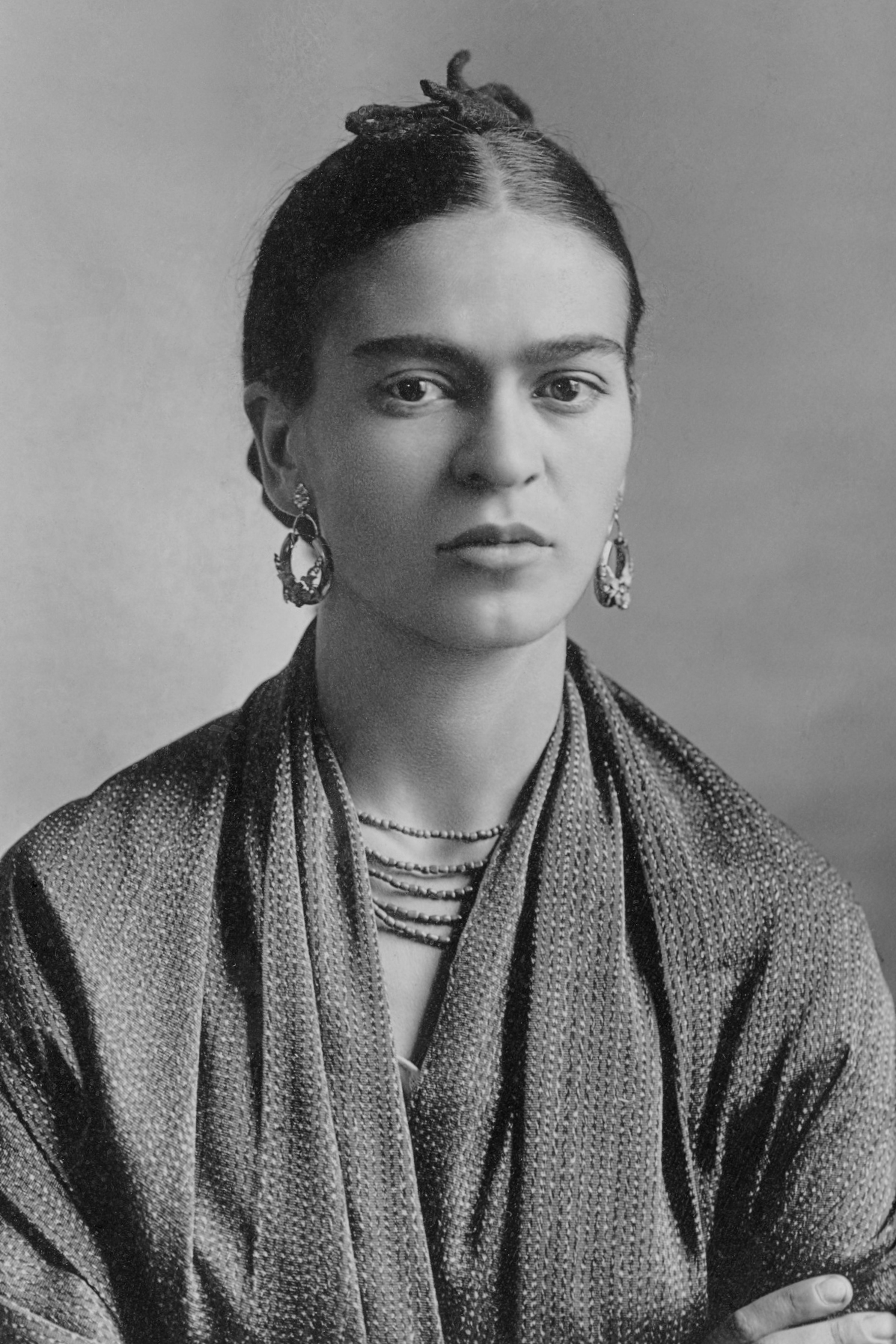
- Kahlo in 1932
- Born: Magdalena Carmen Frida Kahlo y Calderón; 6 July 1907; Coyoacán, Mexico City, Mexico
- Died: 13 July 1954 (aged 47); Coyoacán, Mexico City, Mexico
- Resting place: Cremated; ashes located in the Frida Kahlo Museum, Coyoacán
- Other names: Magdalena Carmen Frieda Kahlo y Calderón; Frieda Kahlo
- Occupation: Painter
- Notable work: Memory, the Heart; The Love Embrace of the Universe, the Earth (Mexico), Myself, Diego, and Señor Xolotl, Self-Portrait with Thorn Necklace and Hummingbird, The Wounded Deer, The Dream (The Bed)
- Movement: Surrealism; Magic realism; Naïve
- Spouses: Diego Rivera (m. 1929; div. 1939) (m. 1940)
- Father: Guillermo Kahlo
- Relatives: Cristina Kahlo (sister)

Magdalena Carmen Frida Kahlo y Calderón (Spanish pronunciation: [ˈfɾiða ˈkalo]; 6 July 1907 – 13 July 1954) was a Mexican painter known for her many portraits, self-portraits, and works inspired by the nature and artifacts of Mexico. Inspired by the country's popular culture, she employed a naïve folk art style to explore questions of identity, postcolonialism, gender, class, and race in Mexican society. Her paintings often had strong autobiographical elements and mixed realism with fantasy. In addition to belonging to the post-revolutionary Mexicayotl movement, which sought to define a Mexican identity, Kahlo has been described as a surrealist or magical realist. She is also known for painting about her experience of chronic pain. Her 1940 self-portrait titled The Dream (The Bed) holds the record for the most expensive work by a female artist ever auctioned, at $54.7 million.

Born to a German father and a mestiza mother (of Purépecha descent), Kahlo spent most of her childhood and adult life at La Casa Azul, her family home in Coyoacán – now publicly accessible as the Frida Kahlo Museum. Although she contracted polio in 1913, which left her disabled, Kahlo had been a promising student headed for medical school until being injured in a bus accident at the age of 18, which caused her lifelong pain and medical problems. During her recovery, she returned to her childhood interest in art with the idea of becoming an artist. Around the same time, she approached artist Diego Rivera, whom she had encountered several years prior when he was painting a mural in her school auditorium, to ask for his opinion whether she should pursue a career as a painter or find another means to support herself. According to Rivera, the two began their "courtship in earnest" shortly after this encounter.

Kahlo's interests in politics and art led her to join the Mexican Communist Party in 1927, through which she once again met fellow Mexican artist Diego Rivera, according to Zelazko. The couple married in 1929 and spent the late 1920s and early 1930s travelling together in Mexico and the United States. During this time, she developed her artistic style, drawing her main inspiration from Mexican folk culture, and painted mostly small self-portraits that mixed elements from pre-Columbian and Catholic beliefs. Her paintings raised the interest of surrealist artist André Breton, who arranged for Kahlo's first solo exhibition at the Julien Levy Gallery in New York in 1938; the exhibition was a success and was followed by another in Paris in 1939. While the French exhibition was less successful, the Louvre purchased a painting from Kahlo, The Frame, making her the first Mexican artist to be featured in their collection. Throughout the 1940s, Kahlo participated in exhibitions in Mexico and the United States and worked as an art teacher. She taught at the Escuela Nacional de Pintura, Escultura y Grabado ("La Esmeralda") and was a founding member of the Seminario de Cultura Mexicana. Kahlo's always-fragile health began to decline in the same decade. While she had had solo exhibitions elsewhere, she had her first solo exhibition in Mexico in 1953, shortly before her death in 1954 at the age of 47.

Kahlo's work as an artist remained relatively unknown until the late 1970s, when her work was rediscovered by art historians and political activists. By the early 1990s, not only had she become a recognized figure in art history, but she was also regarded as an icon for Chicanos, the feminism movement, and the LGBTQ+ community. Kahlo's work has been celebrated internationally as emblematic of Mexican national and Indigenous traditions and by feminists for what is seen as its uncompromising depiction of the female experience and form.

== Artistic career ==
=== Early career ===
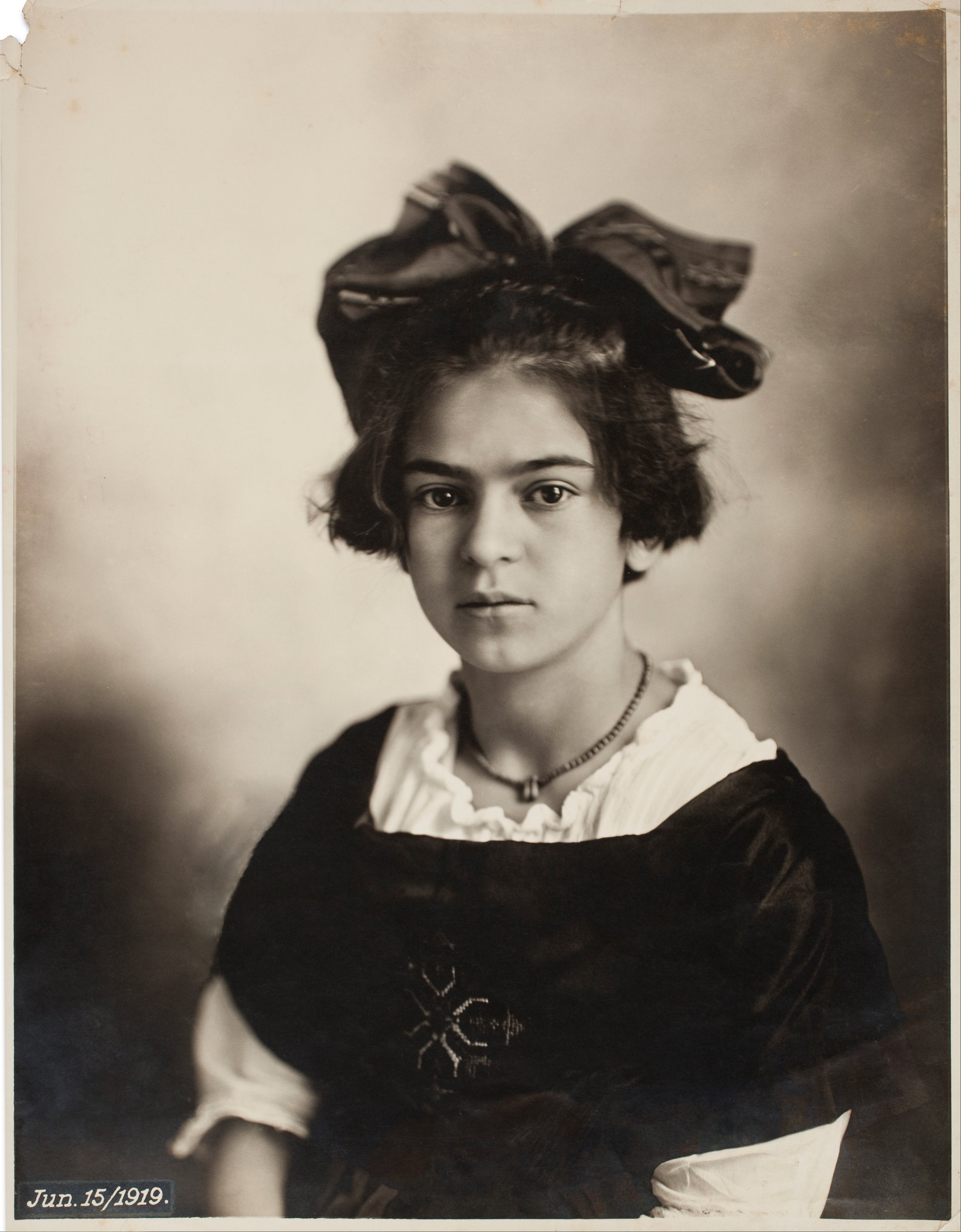
Kahlo on 15 June 1919, aged 11

Kahlo enjoyed art from an early age, receiving drawing instruction from printmaker Fernando Fernández (who was her father's friend) and filling notebooks with sketches. In 1925, she began to work outside of school to help her family. After briefly working as a stenographer, she became a paid engraving apprentice for Fernández. He was impressed by her talent, although she did not consider art as a career at this time.

A severe bus accident at the age of 18 left Kahlo in lifelong pain. Confined to bed for three months following the accident, Kahlo began to paint. She started to consider a career as a medical illustrator, as well, which would combine her interests in science and art. Her mother provided her with a specially-made easel, which enabled her to paint in bed, and her father lent her some of his oil paints. She had a mirror placed above the easel, so that she could see herself. Painting became a way for Kahlo to explore questions of identity and existence. She explained, "I paint myself because I am often alone and I am the subject I know best." She later stated that the accident and the isolating recovery period made her desire "to begin again, painting things just as [she] saw them with [her] own eyes and nothing more."

Most of the paintings Kahlo made during this time were portraits of herself, her sisters, and her school friends. Her early paintings and correspondence show that she drew inspiration especially from European artists, in particular Renaissance masters such as Sandro Botticelli and Bronzino and from avant-garde movements such as Neue Sachlichkeit and Cubism. On moving to Morelos in 1929 with her husband Diego Rivera, Kahlo was inspired by the city of Cuernavaca where they lived. She changed her artistic style and increasingly drew inspiration from Mexican folk art. Art historian Andrea Kettenmann states that she may well have been influenced by Adolfo Best Maugard's treatise on the subject, for she incorporated many of the characteristics that he outlined – for example, the lack of perspective and the combining of elements from pre-Columbian and colonial periods of Mexican art. Her identification with La Raza, the people of Mexico, and her profound interest in its culture remained important facets of her art throughout the rest of her life.

=== Work in the United States ===
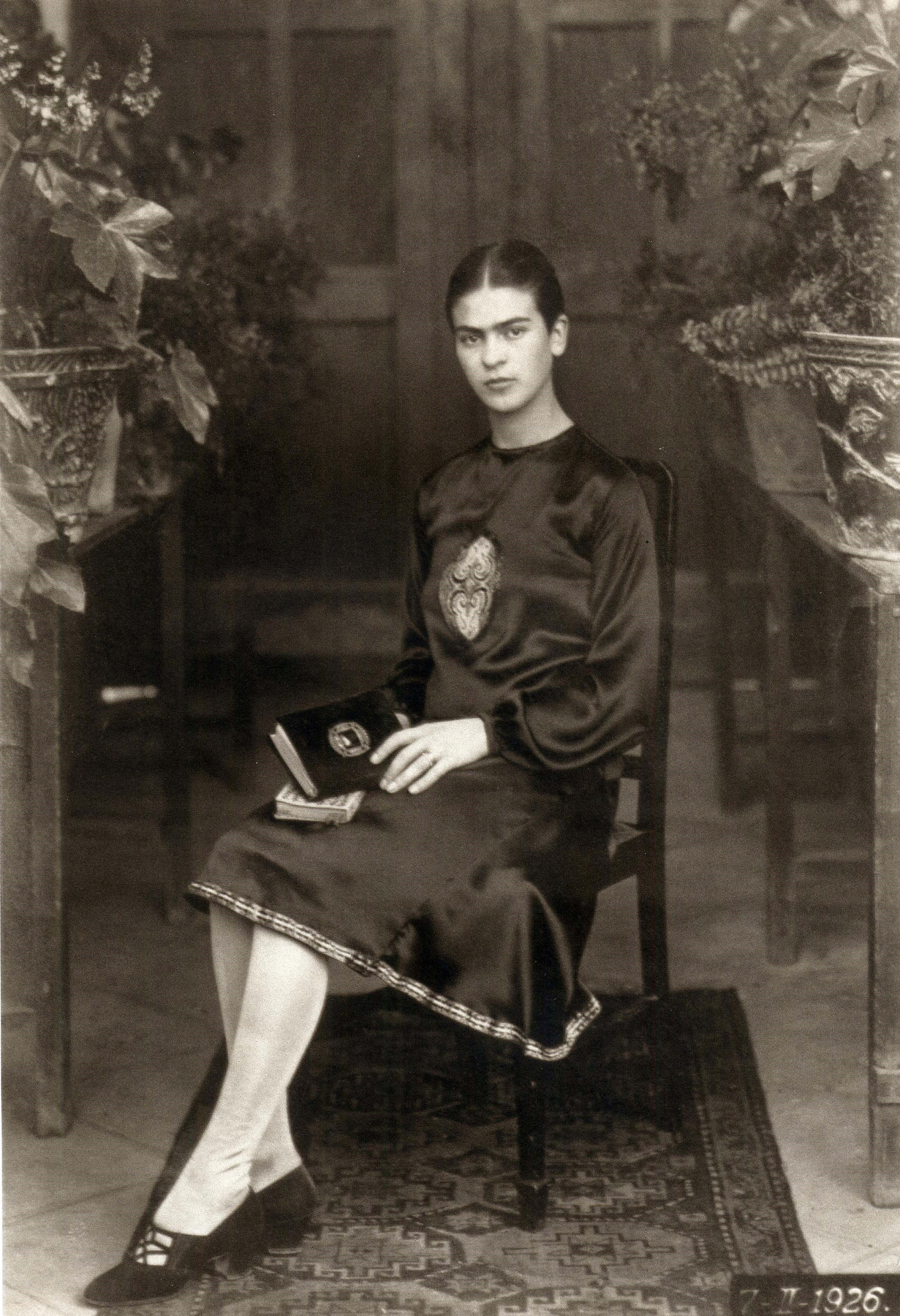
Kahlo in 1926

When Kahlo and Rivera moved to San Francisco in 1930, Kahlo was introduced to American artists such as Edward Weston, Ralph Stackpole, Timothy L. Pflueger, and Nickolas Muray. The six months spent in San Francisco were a productive period for Kahlo, who further developed the folk art style she had adopted in Cuernavaca. In addition to painting portraits of several new acquaintances, she made Frieda and Diego Rivera (1931), a double portrait based on their wedding photograph, and The Portrait of Luther Burbank (1931), which depicted the eponymous horticulturist as a hybrid between a human and a plant. Although she still publicly presented herself as simply Rivera's spouse rather than as an artist, she participated for the first time in an exhibition, when Frieda and Diego Rivera was included in the Sixth Annual Exhibition of the San Francisco Society of Women Artists in the Palace of the Legion of Honor.

On moving to Detroit with Rivera, Kahlo experienced numerous health problems related to a failed pregnancy. Despite these health problems, as well as her dislike for the capitalist culture of the United States, Kahlo's time in the city was beneficial for her artistic expression. She experimented with different techniques, such as etching and frescos, and her paintings began to show a stronger narrative style. She also began placing emphasis on the themes of "terror, suffering, wounds, and pain". Despite the popularity of the mural in Mexican art at the time, she adopted a diametrically opposed medium, votive images or retablos, religious paintings made on small metal sheets by amateur artists to thank saints for their blessings during a calamity. Amongst the works she made in the retablo manner in Detroit are Henry Ford Hospital (1932), My Birth (1932), and Self-Portrait on the Border of Mexico and the United States (1932). While none of Kahlo's works were featured in exhibitions in Detroit, she gave an interview to the Detroit News on her art; the article was condescendingly titled "Wife of the Master Mural Painter Gleefully Dabbles in Works of Art".

=== Return to Mexico City and international recognition ===
Upon returning to Mexico City in 1934 Kahlo made no new paintings, and only two in the following year, due to health complications. In 1937 and 1938, however, Kahlo's artistic career was extremely productive, following her divorce and then reconciliation with Rivera. She painted more "than she had done in all her eight previous years of marriage", creating such works as My Nurse and I (1937), Memory, the Heart (1937), Four Inhabitants of Mexico (1938), and What the Water Gave Me (1938). Although she was still unsure about her work, the National Autonomous University of Mexico exhibited some of her paintings in early 1938. She made her first significant sale in the summer of 1938 when film star and art collector Edward G. Robinson purchased four paintings at $200 each. Even greater recognition followed when French Surrealist André Breton visited Rivera in April 1938. He was impressed by Kahlo, immediately claiming her as a surrealist and describing her work as "a ribbon around a bomb". He not only promised to arrange for her paintings to be exhibited in Paris but also wrote to his friend and art dealer, Julien Levy, who invited her to hold her first solo exhibition at his gallery on the East 57th Street in Manhattan.

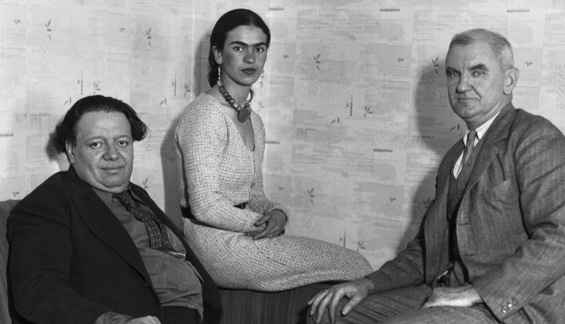
Rivera, Kahlo, and Anson Goodyear

In October, Kahlo traveled alone to New York, where her colorful Mexican dress "caused a sensation" and made her seen as "the height of exotica". The exhibition opening in November was attended by famous figures such as Georgia O'Keeffe and Clare Boothe Luce and received much positive attention in the press, although many critics adopted a condescending tone in their reviews. For example, Time wrote that "Little Frida's pictures ... had the daintiness of miniatures, the vivid reds, and yellows of Mexican tradition and the playfully bloody fancy of an unsentimental child". Despite the Great Depression, Kahlo sold half of the 25 paintings presented in the exhibition. She also received commissions from A. Conger Goodyear, then the president of the MoMA, and Clare Boothe Luce, for whom she painted a portrait of Luce's friend, socialite Dorothy Hale, who had committed suicide by jumping from her apartment building. During the three months she spent in New York, Kahlo painted very little, instead focusing on enjoying the city to the extent that her fragile health allowed. She also had several affairs, continuing the one with Nickolas Muray and engaging in ones with Levy and Edgar Kaufmann, Jr.

In January 1939, Kahlo sailed to Paris to follow up on André Breton's invitation to stage an exhibition of her work. When she arrived, she found that he had not cleared her paintings from the customs and no longer even owned a gallery. With the aid of Marcel Duchamp, she was able to arrange for an exhibition at the Renou et Colle Gallery. Further problems arose when the gallery refused to show all but two of Kahlo's paintings, considering them too shocking for audiences, and Breton insisted that they be shown alongside photographs by Manuel Alvarez Bravo, pre-Columbian sculptures, 18th- and 19th-century Mexican portraits, and what she considered "junk": sugar skulls, toys, and other items he had bought from Mexican markets.

The exhibition opened in March, but received much less attention than she had received in the United States, partly due to the looming Second World War, and made a loss financially, which led Kahlo to cancel a planned exhibition in London. Regardless, the Louvre purchased The Frame, making her the first Mexican artist to be featured in their collection. She was also warmly received by other Parisian artists, such as Pablo Picasso and Joan Miró, as well as the fashion world, with designer Elsa Schiaparelli designing a dress inspired by her and Vogue Paris featuring her on its pages. However, her overall opinion of Paris and the Surrealists remained negative; in a letter to Muray, she called them "this bunch of coocoo lunatics and very stupid surrealists" who "are so crazy 'intellectual' and rotten that I can't even stand them anymore".

In the United States, Kahlo's paintings continued to raise interest. In 1941, her works were featured at the Institute of Contemporary Art in Boston, and, in the following year, she participated in two high-profile exhibitions in New York, the Twentieth-Century Portraits exhibition at the MoMA and the Surrealists' First Papers of Surrealism exhibition. In 1943, she was included in the Mexican Art Today exhibition at the Philadelphia Museum of Art and Women Artists at Peggy Guggenheim's The Art of This Century gallery in New York.

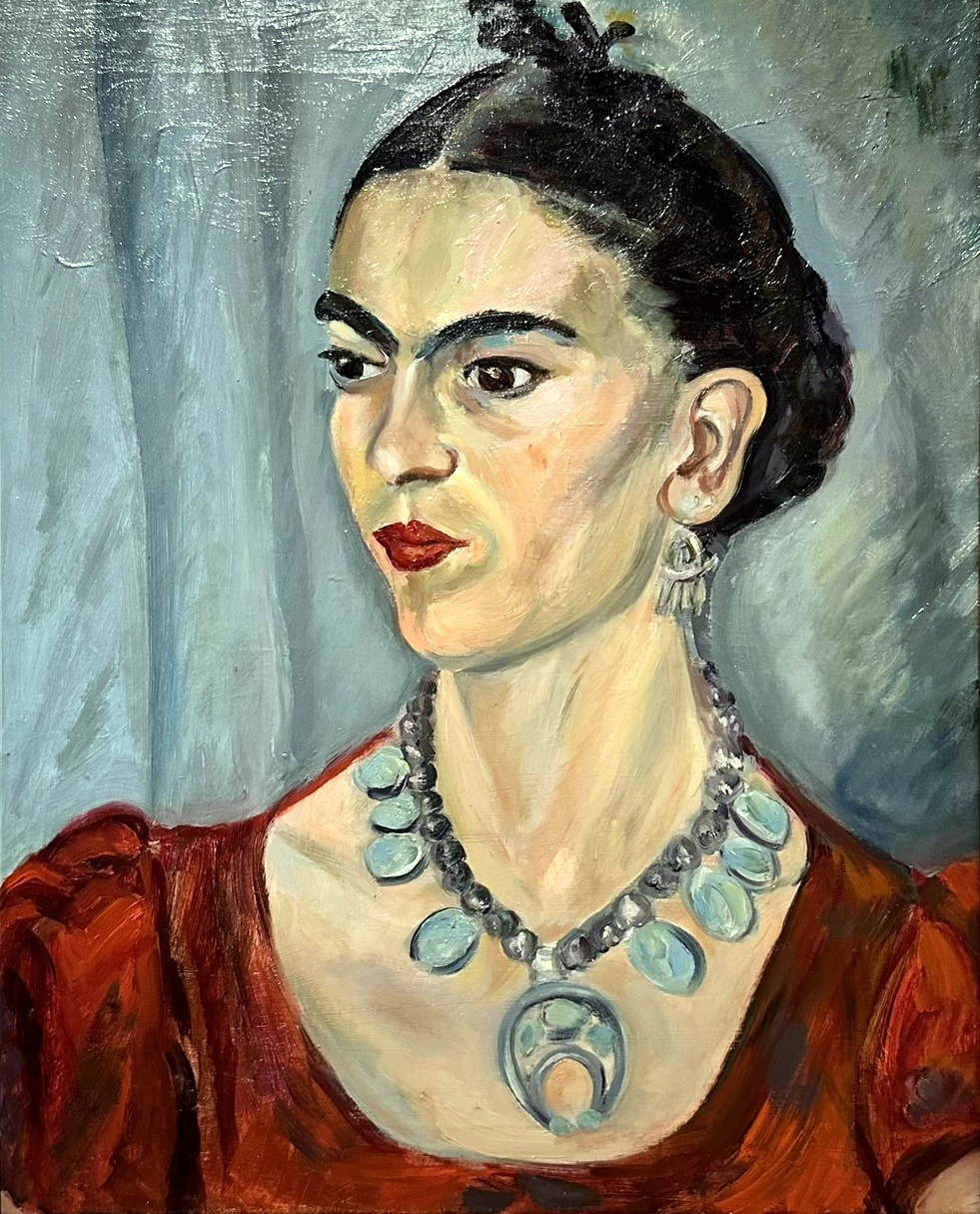
A portrait of Kahlo by Magda Pach, wife of Walter Pach, in the Smithsonian American Art Museum (1933)

Kahlo gained more appreciation for her art in Mexico as well. She became a founding member of the Seminario de Cultura Mexicana, a group of twenty-five artists commissioned by the Ministry of Public Education in 1942 to spread public knowledge of Mexican culture. As a member, she took part in planning exhibitions and attended a conference on art. In Mexico City, her paintings were featured in two exhibitions on Mexican art that were staged at the English-language Benjamin Franklin Library in 1943 and 1944. She was invited to participate in "Salon de la Flor", an exhibition presented at the annual flower exposition. An article by Rivera on Kahlo's art was also published in the journal published by the Seminario de Cultura Mexicana.

In 1943, Kahlo accepted a teaching position at the recently reformed, nationalistic Escuela Nacional de Pintura, Escultura y Grabado "La Esmeralda". She encouraged her students to treat her in an informal and non-hierarchical way and taught them to appreciate Mexican popular culture and folk art and to derive their subjects from the street. When her health problems made it difficult for her to commute to the school in Mexico City, she began to hold her lessons at La Casa Azul. Four of her students – Fanny Rabel, Arturo García Bustos, Guillermo Monroy, and Arturo Estrada – became devotees, and were referred to as "Los Fridos" for their enthusiasm. Kahlo secured three mural commissions for herself and her students.

Kahlo struggled to make a living from her art until the mid to late 1940s, as she refused to adapt her style to suit her clients' wishes. She received two commissions from the Mexican government in the early 1940s. She did not complete the first one, possibly due to her dislike of the subject, and the second commission was rejected by the commissioning body. Nevertheless, she had regular private clients, such as engineer Eduardo Morillo Safa, who ordered more than thirty portraits of family members over the decade. Her financial situation improved when she received a 5000-peso national prize for her painting Moses (1945) in 1946 and when The Two Fridas was purchased by the Museo de Arte Moderno in 1947. According to art historian Andrea Kettenmann, by the mid-1940s, her paintings were "featured in the majority of group exhibitions in Mexico". Further, Martha Zamora wrote that she could "sell whatever she was currently painting; sometimes incomplete pictures were purchased right off the easel".

=== Later years ===
External images
- The Broken Column (1944)
- Moses (1945)
- Without Hope (1945)
- Tree of Hope, Stand Fast (1946)

Even as Kahlo was gaining recognition in Mexico, her health was declining rapidly, and an attempted surgery to support her spine failed. Her paintings from this period include Broken Column (1944), Moses (1945), Without Hope (1945), Tree of Hope, Stand Fast (1946), and The Wounded Deer (1946), reflecting her poor physical state. During her last years, Kahlo was mostly confined to the Casa Azul. She painted mostly still lifes, portraying fruit and flowers with political symbols such as flags or doves. She was concerned about being able to portray her political convictions, stating that "I have a great restlessness about my paintings. Mainly because I want to make it useful to the revolutionary communist movement... until now I have managed simply an honest expression of my own self ... I must struggle with all my strength to ensure that the little positive my health allows me to do also benefits the Revolution, the only real reason to live." She also altered her painting style: her brushstrokes, previously delicate and careful, were now hastier, her use of color more brash, and the overall style more intense and feverish.

Photographer Lola Alvarez Bravo understood that Kahlo did not have long to live, and thus staged her first solo exhibition in Mexico at the Galería Arte Contemporaneo in April 1953. Though Kahlo was initially not due to attend the opening, as her doctors had prescribed bed rest for her, she ordered her four-poster bed to be moved from her home to the gallery. To the surprise of the guests, she arrived in an ambulance and was carried on a stretcher to the bed, where she stayed for the duration of the party. The exhibition was a notable cultural event in Mexico and also received attention in mainstream press around the world. The same year, the Tate Gallery's exhibition on Mexican art in London featured five of her paintings.

In 1954, Kahlo was again hospitalized in April and May. That spring, she resumed painting after a one-year interval. Her last paintings include the political Marxism Will Give Health to the Sick (c. 1954) and Frida and Stalin (c. 1954) and the still-life Viva La Vida (1954).

=== Self-portraits ===
- Self-portrait on the Border of Mexico and the United States (1932)
- Henry Ford Hospital (1932)
- Self-Portrait Dedicated to Leon Trotsky (1937)
- The Two Fridas (1939)
- The Dream (The Bed) (1940). In 2025, this painting sold for $54.7m, setting a record for the highest sale price at auction for any work by any female artist.
- Self-Portrait with Thorn Necklace and Hummingbird (1940)
- Self-Portrait with Cropped Hair

== Style and influences ==
Self-portrait in a Velvet Dress, 1926

Estimates vary on how many paintings Kahlo made during her life, with figures ranging from fewer than 150 to around 200. Her earliest paintings, which she made in the mid-1920s, show influence from Renaissance masters and European avant-garde artists such as Amedeo Modigliani. Towards the end of the decade, Kahlo derived more inspiration from Mexican folk art, drawn to its elements of "fantasy, naivety, and fascination with violence and death". The style she developed mixed reality with surrealistic elements and often depicted pain and death.

One of Kahlo's earliest champions was Surrealist artist André Breton, who claimed her as part of the movement as an artist who had supposedly developed her style "in total ignorance of the ideas that motivated the activities of my friends and myself". This was echoed by Bertram D. Wolfe, who wrote that Kahlo's was a "sort of 'naïve' Surrealism, which she invented for herself". Although Breton regarded her as mostly a feminine force within the Surrealist movement, Kahlo brought postcolonial questions and themes to the forefront of her brand of Surrealism. Breton also described Kahlo's work as "wonderfully situated at the point of intersection between the political (philosophical) line and the artistic line". While she subsequently participated in Surrealist exhibitions, she stated that she "detest[ed] Surrealism", which to her was "bourgeois art" and not "true art that the people hope from the artist". Some art historians have disagreed whether her work should be classified as belonging to the movement at all. According to Andrea Kettenmann, Kahlo was a symbolist concerned more in portraying her inner experiences. Emma Dexter has argued that, as Kahlo derived her mix of fantasy and reality mainly from Aztec mythology and Mexican culture instead of Surrealism, it is more appropriate to consider her paintings as having more in common with magical realism, or an unrelated movement known as New Objectivity. It combined reality and fantasy and employed similar style to Kahlo's, such as flattened perspective, clearly outlined characters and bright colours.

=== Mexicanidad ===
Similarly to many other contemporary Mexican artists, Kahlo was heavily influenced by Mexicanidad, a romantic nationalism that had developed in the aftermath of the revolution. The Mexicanidad movement claimed to resist the "mindset of cultural inferiority" created by colonialism, and placed special importance on Indigenous cultures. Before the revolution, Mexican folk culture – a mixture of Indigenous and European elements – was disparaged by the elite, who claimed to have purely European ancestry and regarded Europe as the definition of civilization which Mexico should imitate. Kahlo's artistic ambition was to paint for the Mexican people, and she stated that she wished "to be worthy, with my paintings, of the people to whom I belong and to the ideas which strengthen me". To enforce this image, she preferred to conceal the education she had received in art from her father and Ferdinand Fernandez and at the preparatory school. Instead, she cultivated an image of herself as a "self-taught and naive artist".

When Kahlo began her career as an artist in the 1920s, muralists dominated the Mexican art scene. They created large public pieces in the vein of Renaissance masters and Russian socialist realists: they usually depicted masses of people, and their political messages were easy to decipher. Although she was close to muralists such as Rivera, José Clemente Orozco and David Alfaro Siquieros and shared their commitment to socialism and Mexican nationalism, the majority of Kahlo's paintings were self-portraits of relatively small size. Particularly in the 1930s, her style was especially indebted to votive paintings or retablos, which were postcard-sized religious images made by amateur artists. Their purpose was to thank saints for their protection during a calamity, and they normally depicted an event, such as an illness or an accident, from which its commissioner had been saved. The focus was on the figures depicted, and they seldom featured a realistic perspective or detailed background, thus distilling the event to its essentials. Kahlo had an extensive collection of approximately 2,000 retablos, which she displayed on the walls of La Casa Azul. According to Laura Mulvey and Peter Wollen, the retablo format enabled Kahlo to "develop the limits of the purely iconic and allowed her to use narrative and allegory".

Many of Kahlo's self-portraits mimic the classic bust-length portraits that were fashionable during the colonial era, but they subverted the format by depicting their subject as less attractive than in reality. She concentrated more frequently on this format towards the end of the 1930s, thus reflecting changes in Mexican society. Increasingly disillusioned by the legacy of the revolution and struggling to cope with the effects of the Great Depression, Mexicans were abandoning the ethos of socialism for individualism. This was reflected by the "personality cults", which developed around Mexican film stars such as Dolores del Río. According to Schaefer, Kahlo's "mask-like self-portraits echo the contemporaneous fascination with the cinematic close-up of feminine beauty, as well as the mystique of female otherness expressed in film noir." By always repeating the same facial features, Kahlo drew from the depiction of goddesses and saints in Indigenous and Catholic cultures.

Out of specific Mexican folk artists, Kahlo was especially influenced by Hermenegildo Bustos, whose works portrayed Mexican culture and peasant life, and José Guadalupe Posada, who depicted accidents and crime in satiric manner. She also derived inspiration from the works of Hieronymus Bosch, whom she called a "man of genius", and Pieter Bruegel the Elder, whose focus on peasant life was similar to her own interest in the Mexican people. Another influence was the poet Rosario Castellanos, whose poems often chronicle a woman's lot in the patriarchal Mexican society, a concern with the female body, and tell stories of immense physical and emotional pain.

=== Symbolism and iconography ===
Self-Portrait with Thorn Necklace and Hummingbird (1940), Harry Ransom Center

Kahlo's paintings often feature root imagery, with roots growing out of her body to tie her to the ground. This reflects in a positive sense the theme of personal growth; in a negative sense of being trapped in a particular place, time and situation; and in an ambiguous sense of how memories of the past influence the present for good or ill. In My Grandparents and I, Kahlo painted herself as a ten-year old, holding a ribbon that grows from an ancient tree that bears the portraits of her grandparents and other ancestors while her left foot is a tree trunk growing out of the ground, reflecting Kahlo's view of humanity's unity with the earth and her own sense of unity with Mexico. In Kahlo's paintings, trees serve as symbols of hope, of strength and of a continuity that transcends generations. Additionally, hair features as a symbol of growth and of the feminine in Kahlo's paintings and in Self-Portrait with Cropped Hair, Kahlo painted herself wearing a man's suit and shorn of her long hair, which she had just cut off. Kahlo holds the scissors with one hand menacingly close to her genitals, which can be interpreted as a threat to Rivera—whose frequent unfaithfulness infuriated her—or a threat to harm her own body like she has attacked her own hair, a sign of the way that women often project their fury against others onto themselves. Moreover, the picture reflects Kahlo's frustration not only with Rivera, but also her unease with the patriarchal values of Mexico as the scissors symbolize a malevolent sense of masculinity that threatens to "cut up" women, both metaphorically and literally. In Mexico, the traditional Spanish values of machismo were widely embraced, but Kahlo was always uncomfortable with machismo.

As she suffered for the rest of her life from the bus accident in her youth, Kahlo spent much of her life in hospitals and undergoing surgery, much of it performed by quacks who Kahlo believed could restore her back to where she had been before the accident. Many of Kahlo's paintings are concerned with medical imagery, which is presented in terms of pain and hurt, featuring Kahlo bleeding and displaying her open wounds.

In 1929, she painted "The Bus", alluding to her accident: visible are the passengers sitting on benches as well as the man in the blue overalls who removed the piece of handrail that pierced her body and another passenger, holding what could be a bag of gold dust which was scattered over Frida's naked body during the crash. Many of Kahlo's medical paintings, especially dealing with childbirth and miscarriage, have a strong sense of guilt, of a sense of living one's life at the expense of another who has died so one might live.

Although Kahlo featured herself and events from her life in her paintings, they were often ambiguous in meaning. She did not use them only to show her subjective experience but to raise questions about Mexican society and the construction of identity within it, particularly gender, race, and social class. Historian Liza Bakewell has stated that Kahlo "recognized the conflicts brought on by revolutionary ideology":

What was it to be a Mexican? – modern, yet pre-Columbian; young, yet old; anti-Catholic yet Catholic; Western, yet New World; developing, yet underdeveloped; independent, yet colonized; mestizo, yet not Spanish nor Indian.

To explore these questions through her art, Kahlo developed a complex iconography, extensively employing pre-Columbian and Christian symbols and mythology in her paintings. In most of her self-portraits, she depicts her face as mask-like, but surrounded by visual cues which allow the viewer to decipher deeper meanings for it. Aztec mythology features heavily in Kahlo's paintings in symbols including monkeys, skeletons, skulls, blood, and hearts; often, these symbols referred to the myths of Coatlicue, Quetzalcoatl, and Xolotl. Other central elements that Kahlo derived from Aztec mythology were hybridity and dualism. Many of her paintings depict opposites: life and death, pre-modernity and modernity, Mexican and European, male and female.

In addition to Aztec legends, Kahlo frequently depicted two central female figures from Mexican folklore in her paintings: La Llorona and La Malinche as interlinked to the hard situations, the suffering, misfortune or judgement, as being calamitous, wretched or being "de la chingada". For example, when she painted herself following her miscarriage in Detroit in Henry Ford Hospital (1932), she shows herself as weeping, with dishevelled hair and an exposed heart, which are all considered part of the appearance of La Llorona, a woman who murdered her children. The painting was traditionally interpreted as simply a depiction of Kahlo's grief and pain over her failed pregnancies. But with the interpretation of the symbols in the painting and the information of Kahlo's actual views towards motherhood from her correspondence, the painting has been seen as depicting the unconventional and taboo choice of a woman remaining childless in Mexican society.

Kahlo often featured her own body in her paintings, presenting it in varying states and disguises: as wounded, broken, as a child, or clothed in different outfits, such as the Tehuana costume, a man's suit, or a European dress. She often wore masculine clothes as part of her deliberate challenge to gender norms and cultural expectations. She used her body as a metaphor to explore questions on societal roles. Her paintings often depicted the female body in an unconventional manner, such as during miscarriages, and childbirth or cross-dressing. In depicting the female body in graphic manner, Kahlo positioned the viewer in the role of the voyeur, "making it virtually impossible for a viewer not to assume a consciously held position in response".

According to Nancy Cooey, Kahlo made herself through her paintings into "the main character of her own mythology, as a woman, as a Mexican, and as a suffering person ... She knew how to convert each into a symbol or sign capable of expressing the enormous spiritual resistance of humanity and its splendid sexuality". Similarly, Nancy Deffebach has stated that Kahlo "created herself as a subject who was female, Mexican, modern, and powerful", and who diverged from the usual dichotomy of roles of mother/whore allowed to women in Mexican society. Due to her gender and divergence from the muralist tradition, Kahlo's paintings were treated as less political and more naïve and subjective than those of her male counterparts up until the late 1980s. According to art historian Joan Borsa

the critical reception of her exploration of subjectivity and personal history has all too frequently denied or de-emphasized the politics involved in examining one's own location, inheritances and social conditions ... Critical responses continue to gloss over Kahlo's reworking of the personal, ignoring or minimizing her interrogation of sexuality, sexual difference, marginality, cultural identity, female subjectivity, politics and power.

== Personal life ==
=== 1907–1924: Family and childhood ===
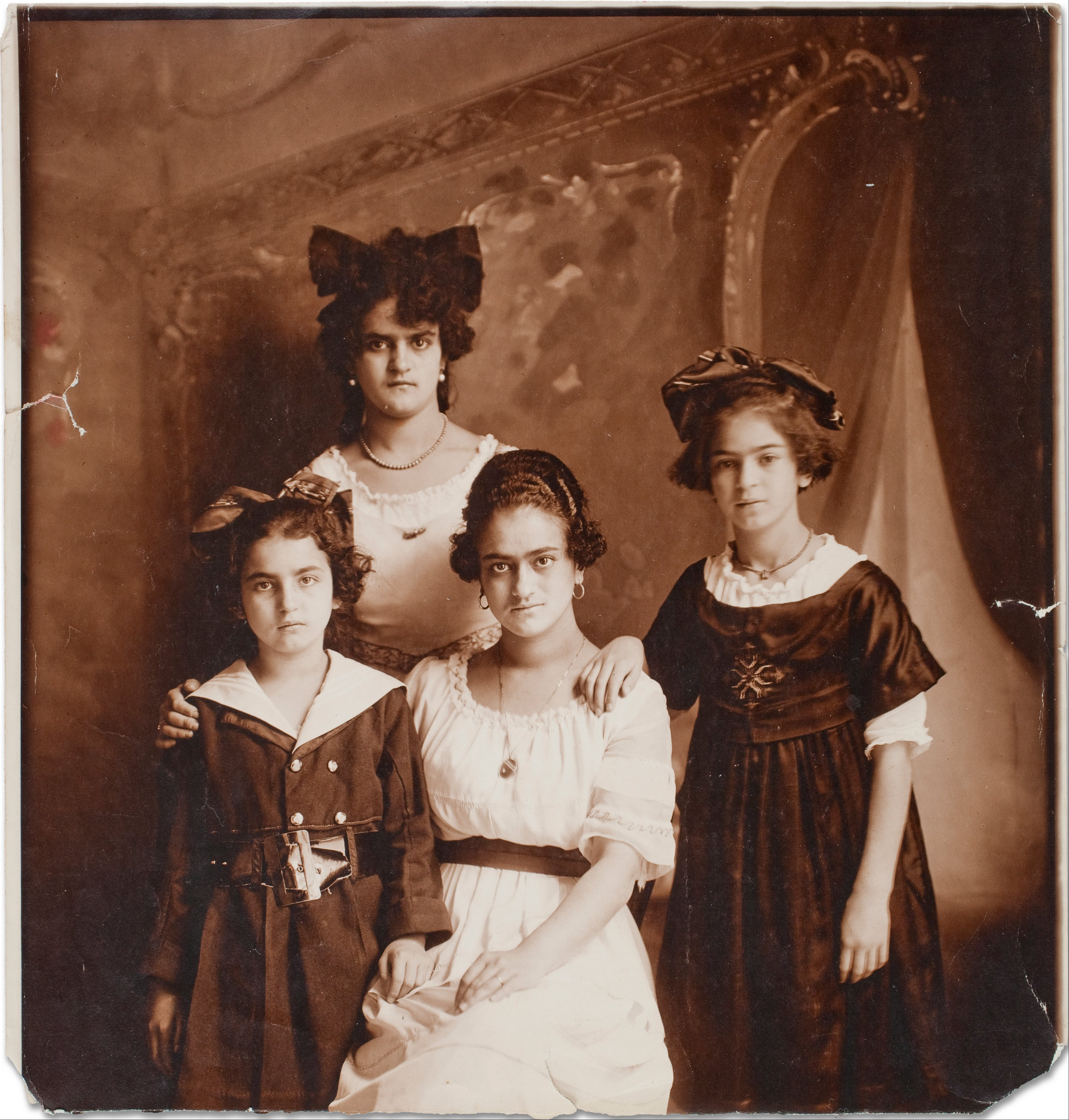
Kahlo (on the right) and her sisters Cristina, Matilde, and Adriana, photographed by their father, 1916

Magdalena Carmen Frida Kahlo y Calderón (Note: Kahlo was given her first two names so that she could be baptized according to Catholic traditions, but was always called Frida. She preferred to spell her name "Frieda" until the late 1930s, when she dropped the 'e' as she did not wish to be associated with Germany during Hitler's rule.) was born on 6 July 1907 in Coyoacán, a village on the outskirts of Mexico City. Kahlo stated that she was born at the family home, La Casa Azul (The Blue House), but according to the official birth registry, the birth took place at the nearby home of her maternal grandmother. Kahlo's parents were photographer Guillermo Kahlo (1871–1941) and Matilde Calderón y González (1876–1932), and they were thirty-six and thirty, respectively, when she was born. Originally from Germany, Guillermo had immigrated to Mexico in 1891, after epilepsy caused by an accident ended his university studies. Although Kahlo said her father was Jewish and her paternal grandparents were Jews from the city of Arad, this claim was challenged in 2006 by a pair of German genealogists who discovered he came from a Lutheran family. Matilde was born in Oaxaca to an Indigenous father and a mother of Spanish descent. In addition to Kahlo, the marriage produced daughters Matilde (1899–1951), Adriana (1902–1968), and Cristina (1908–1964). She had two half-sisters from Guillermo's first marriage, María Luisa and Margarita, but they were raised in a convent.

Kahlo later described the atmosphere in her childhood home as often "very, very sad". Both parents were often sick, with her father suffering from frequent epileptic episodes and her mother from various chronic ailments such as gallstones, depression and breast cancer. Furthermore, it appears their marriage was devoid of love. Her relationship with her mother, Matilde, was extremely tense. Kahlo described her mother as "kind, active and intelligent, but also calculating, cruel and fanatically religious". Her father Guillermo's photography business suffered greatly during the Mexican Revolution, as the overthrown government had commissioned works from him, and the long civil war limited the number of private clients.

When Kahlo was six years old, she contracted polio, which eventually made her right leg grow shorter and thinner than the left. (Note: Given Kahlo's later problems with scoliosis and with her hips and limbs, neurologist Budrys Valmantas has argued that she had a congenital condition, spina bifida, which was diagnosed by Dr. Leo Eloesser when she was a young adult. Psychologist and art historian Dr. Salomon Grimberg disagrees, stating that Kahlo's problems were instead the result of not wearing an orthopedic shoe on her affected right leg, which led to damage to her hips and spine.) The illness forced her to be isolated from her peers for months, and she was bullied. While the experience made her reclusive, it made her Guillermo's favorite due to their shared experience of living with disability. Kahlo credited him for making her childhood "marvelous ... he was an immense example to me of tenderness, of work (photographer and also painter), and above all in understanding for all my problems." He taught her about literature, nature, and philosophy, and encouraged her to play sports to regain her strength, despite the fact that most physical exercise was seen as unsuitable for girls. He also taught her photography, and she began to help him retouch, develop, and color photographs.

Due to polio, Kahlo began school later than her peers. Along with her younger sister Cristina, she attended the local kindergarten and primary school in Coyoacán and was homeschooled for the fifth and sixth grades. While Cristina followed their sisters into a convent school, Kahlo was enrolled in a German school due to their father's wishes. She was soon expelled for disobedience and was sent to a vocational teachers school. Her stay at the school was brief, as she was sexually abused by a female teacher.

In 1922, Kahlo was accepted to the elite National Preparatory School, where she focused on natural sciences with the aim of becoming a physician. The institution had only recently begun admitting women, with only 35 girls out of 2,000 students. She performed well academically, was a voracious reader, and became "deeply immersed and seriously committed to Mexican culture, political activism and issues of social justice". The school promoted indigenismo, a new sense of Mexican identity that took pride in the country's Indigenous heritage and sought to rid itself of the colonial mindset of Europe as superior to Mexico. Particularly influential to Kahlo at this time were nine of her schoolmates, with whom she formed an informal group called the "Cachuchas" – many of them would become leading figures of the Mexican intellectual elite. They were rebellious and against everything conservative and pulled pranks, staged plays, and debated philosophy and Russian classics. To mask the fact that she was older and to declare herself a "daughter of the revolution", she began saying that she had been born on 7 July 1910, the year the Mexican Revolution began, which she continued throughout her life. She fell in love with Alejandro Gómez Arias, the leader of the group and her first love. Her parents did not approve of the relationship. Gómez Arias and Kahlo were often separated from each other, due to the political instability and violence of the period, so they exchanged passionate love letters.

=== 1925–1930: Bus accident and marriage to Diego Rivera ===
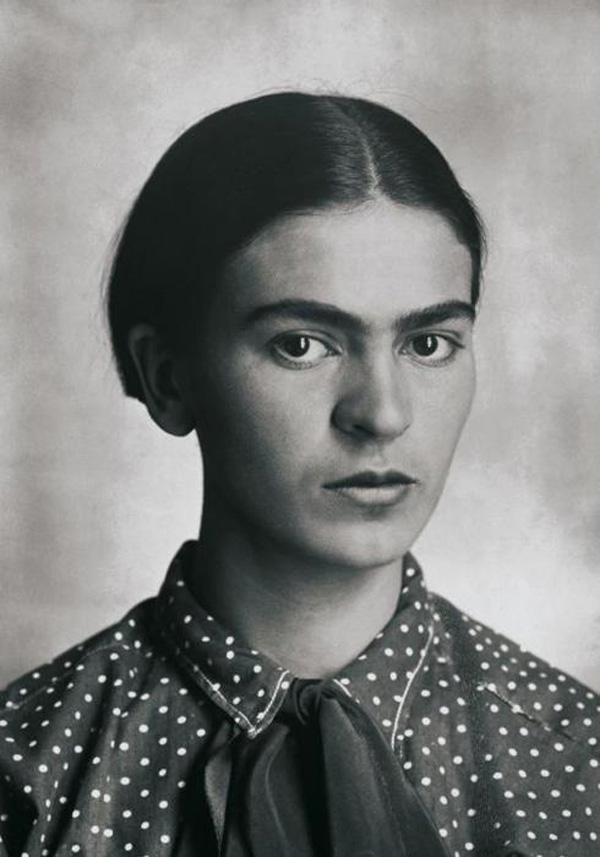
Kahlo photographed by her father in 1926

On 17 September 1925, Kahlo and her boyfriend, Gómez Arias, were on their way home from school. They boarded one bus, but they got off the bus to look for an umbrella that Kahlo had left behind. They then boarded a second bus, which was crowded, and they sat in the back. The driver attempted to pass an oncoming electric streetcar. The streetcar crashed into the side of the wooden bus, dragging it a few feet. Several passengers were killed in the accident. While Gómez Arias only suffered minor injuries, Frida was impaled by an iron handrail that went through her pelvis. She later described the injury as "the way a sword pierces a bull". The handrail was removed by Gómez Arias and others, which was incredibly painful for Kahlo.

Kahlo suffered many injuries: her pelvic bone had been fractured, her abdomen and uterus had been punctured by the rail, her spine was broken in three places, her right leg was broken in eleven places, her right foot was crushed and dislocated, her collarbone was broken, and her shoulder was dislocated. She spent a month in hospital and two months recovering at home before being able to return to work. As she continued to experience fatigue and back pain, her doctors ordered X-rays, which revealed that the accident had also displaced three vertebrae. As treatment she had to wear a plaster corset which confined her to bed rest for the better part of three months.

The accident ended Kahlo's dreams of becoming a physician and caused her pain and illness for the rest of her life; her friend Andrés Henestrosa stated that Kahlo "lived dying". During her painful recovery, she frequently wrote passionate and vulnerable letters to Gómez Arias which are partly preserved in the Google Arts & Culture Exhibit. He remained by her side for more than a year into her convalescence, then left for Europe in the early spring of 1927 and broke off the relationship shortly after returning to Mexico in autumn of the same year.

Kahlo's bed rest was over by late 1927, and she began socializing with her old school friends, who were now at university and involved in student politics. She joined the Mexican Communist Party (PCM) and was introduced to a circle of political activists and artists, including the exiled Cuban communist Julio Antonio Mella and the Italian-American photographer Tina Modotti.

At one of Modotti's parties in June 1928, Kahlo was introduced to Diego Rivera. They had met briefly in 1922 when he was painting a mural at her school. Shortly after their introduction in 1928, Kahlo asked him to judge whether her paintings showed enough talent for her to pursue a career as an artist. Rivera recalled being impressed by her works, stating that they showed "an unusual energy of expression, precise delineation of character, and true severity ... They had a fundamental plastic honesty, and an artistic personality of their own ... It was obvious to me that this girl was an authentic artist".

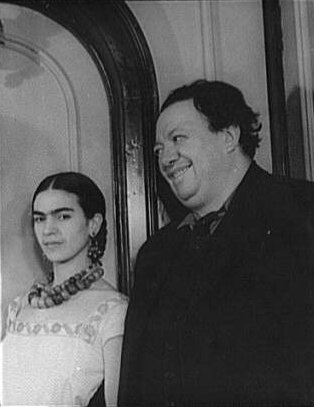
Kahlo with husband Diego Rivera in 1932

Kahlo soon began a relationship with Rivera, who was 21 years her senior and had two common-law wives. Kahlo and Rivera were married in a civil ceremony at the town hall of Coyoacán on 21 August 1929. Her mother opposed the marriage, and both parents referred to it as a "marriage between an elephant and a dove", referring to the couple's differences in size; Rivera was tall and overweight while Kahlo was petite and fragile. Regardless, her father approved of Rivera, who was wealthy and therefore able to support Kahlo, who could not work and had to receive expensive medical treatment. The wedding was reported by the Mexican and international press, and the marriage was subject to constant media attention in Mexico in the following years, with articles referring to the couple as simply "Diego and Frida".

Soon after the marriage, in late 1929, Kahlo and Rivera moved to Cuernavaca in the rural state of Morelos, where he had been commissioned to paint murals for the Palace of Cortés. Around the same time, she resigned her membership of the PCM in support of Rivera, who had been expelled shortly before the marriage for his support of the leftist opposition movement within the Third International.

During the civil war Morelos had seen some of the heaviest fighting, and life in the Spanish-style city of Cuernavaca sharpened Kahlo's sense of a Mexican identity and history. Similar to many other Mexican women artists and intellectuals at the time, Kahlo began wearing traditional Indigenous Mexican peasant clothing to emphasize her mestiza ancestry: long and colorful skirts, huipils and rebozos, elaborate headdresses and masses of jewelry. She especially favored the dress of women from the allegedly matriarchal society of the Isthmus of Tehuantepec, who had come to represent "an authentic and indigenous Mexican cultural heritage" in post-revolutionary Mexico. The Tehuana outfit allowed Kahlo to express her feminist and anti-colonialist ideals.

=== 1931–1933: Travels in the United States ===
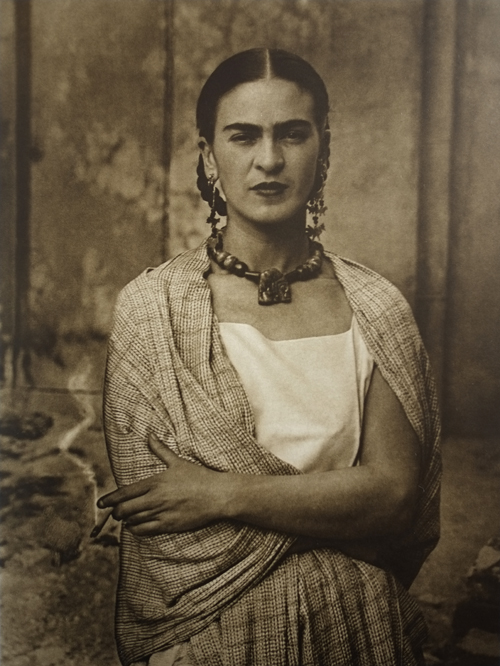
Frida photographed in 1932 by her father, Guillermo

After Rivera had completed the commission in Cuernavaca in late 1930, he and Kahlo moved to San Francisco, where he painted murals for the Luncheon Club of the San Francisco Stock Exchange and the California School of Fine Arts. The couple was "feted, lionized, [and] spoiled" by influential collectors and clients during their stay in the city. Her long love affair with Hungarian-American photographer Nickolas Muray most likely began around this time.

Kahlo and Rivera returned to Mexico for the summer of 1931, and in the fall traveled to New York City for the opening of Rivera's retrospective at the Museum of Modern Art (MoMA). In April 1932, they headed to Detroit, where Rivera had been commissioned to paint murals for the Detroit Institute of Arts. By this time, Kahlo had become bolder in her interactions with the press, impressing journalists with her fluency in English and stating on her arrival to the city that she was the greater artist of the two of them.

Of course he [Rivera] does well for a little boy, but it is I who am the big artist

— Frida Kahlo in interview with the Detroit News, 2 February 1933

The year spent in Detroit was a difficult time for Kahlo. Although she had enjoyed visiting San Francisco and New York City, she disliked aspects of American society, which she regarded as colonialist, as well as most Americans, whom she found "boring". She disliked having to socialize with capitalists such as Henry and Edsel Ford, and was angered that many of the hotels in Detroit refused to accept Jewish guests. In a letter to a friend, she wrote that "although I am very interested in all the industrial and mechanical development of the United States", she felt "a bit of a rage against all the rich guys here, since I have seen thousands of people in the most terrible misery without anything to eat and with no place to sleep, that is what has most impressed me here, it is terrifying to see the rich having parties day and night while thousands and thousands of people are dying of hunger." Kahlo's time in Detroit was also complicated by a pregnancy. Her doctor agreed to perform an abortion, but the medication used was ineffective. Kahlo was deeply ambivalent about having a child and had already undergone an abortion earlier in her marriage to Rivera. Following the failed abortion, she reluctantly agreed to continue with the pregnancy, but miscarried in July, which caused a serious hemorrhage that required her being hospitalized for two weeks. Less than three months later, her mother died from complications of surgery in Mexico.

External images
- Henry Ford Hospital (1932)
- Self-portrait on the Border of Mexico and the United States (1932)
- My Dress Hangs There (1933)
- My Birth (1932)

Kahlo and Rivera returned to New York in March 1933, for he had been commissioned to paint a mural for the Rockefeller Center. During this time, she only worked on one painting, My Dress Hangs There (1933). She also gave further interviews to the American press. In May, Rivera was fired from the Rockefeller Center project and was instead hired to paint a mural for the New Workers School. Although Rivera wished to continue their stay in the United States, Kahlo was homesick, and they returned to Mexico soon after the mural's unveiling in December 1933.

=== 1934–1949: La Casa Azul and declining health ===
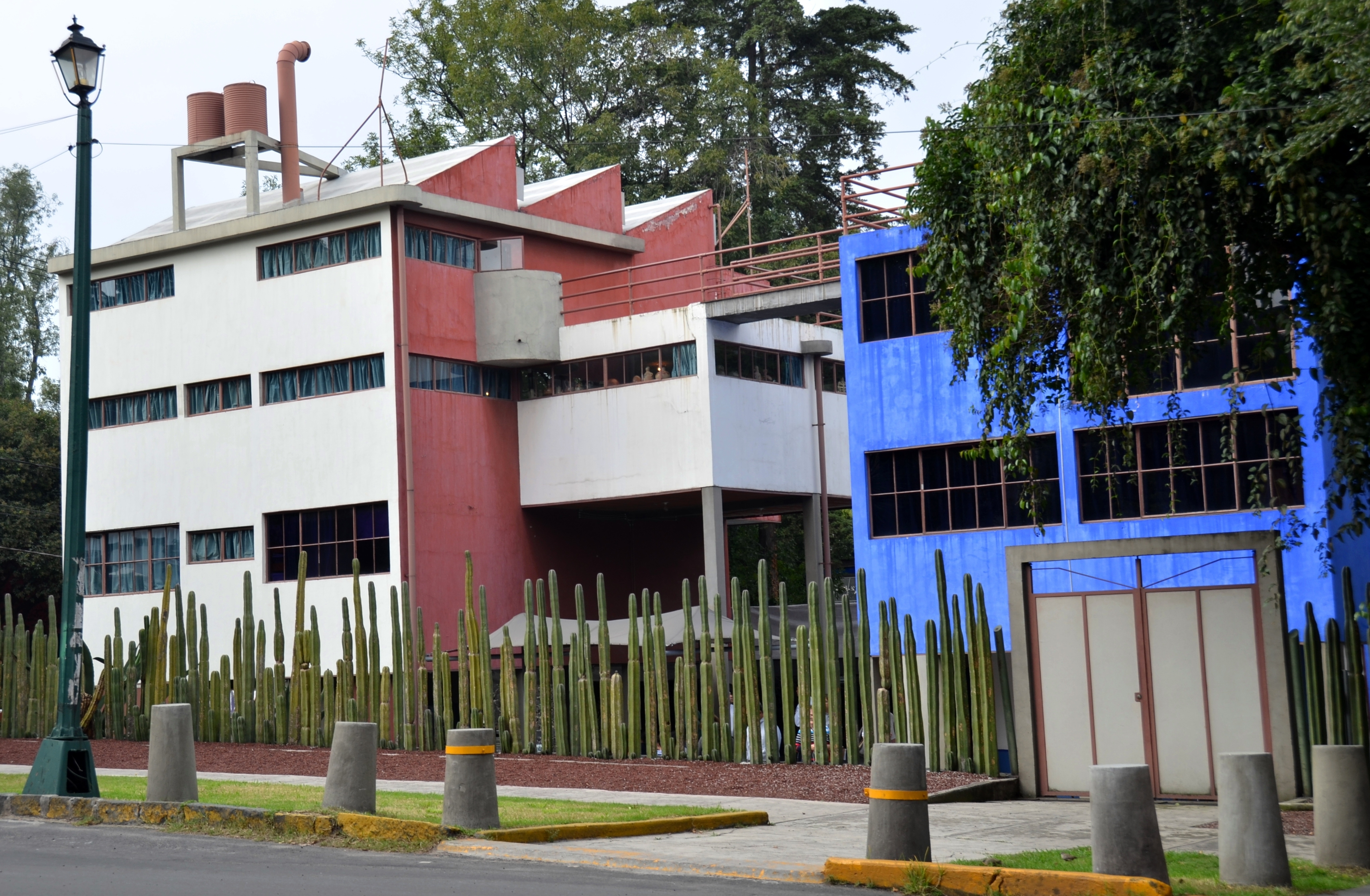
Kahlo and Rivera's houses in San Ángel. They lived there from 1934 until their divorce in 1939, after which it became his studio.

Back in Mexico City, Kahlo and Rivera moved into a new house in the wealthy neighborhood of San Ángel. Commissioned from Le Corbusier's student Juan O'Gorman, it consisted of two sections joined by a bridge; Kahlo's was painted blue and Rivera's pink and white. The bohemian residence became an important meeting place for artists and political activists from Mexico and abroad.

Kahlo once again experienced health problems – undergoing an appendectomy, two abortions, and the amputation of gangrenous toes – and her marriage to Rivera had become strained. He was not happy to be back in Mexico and blamed Kahlo for their return. While he had been unfaithful to her before, he now embarked on an affair with her younger sister Cristina, which deeply hurt Kahlo's feelings. After discovering the affair in early 1935, she moved to an apartment in central Mexico City and considered divorcing him. She also had an affair of her own with American artist Isamu Noguchi.

Kahlo was reconciled with Rivera and Cristina later in 1935 and moved back to San Ángel. She became a loving aunt to Cristina's children, Isolda and Antonio. Despite the reconciliation, both Rivera and Kahlo continued their infidelities. She also resumed her political activities in 1936, joining the Fourth International and becoming a founding member of a solidarity committee to provide aid to the Republicans in the Spanish Civil War. Having embraced the Fourth International and Trotskyism, she and Rivera successfully petitioned the Mexican government to grant asylum to former Soviet leader Leon Trotsky and offered La Casa Azul for him and his wife Natalia Sedova as a residence. The couple lived there from January 1937 until April 1939, with Kahlo and Trotsky not only becoming good friends but also having a brief affair. Kahlo painted Self-Portrait Dedicated to Leon Trotsky in 1937 during their time together in Mexico City, including a written inscription to Trotsky in the painting on a letter that Kahlo's figure holds. Later, Kahlo shifted her political views, embracing Stalinism, which caused a rift between her and Trotsky. Nevertheless, Trotsky attempted to rekindle his relationship with Frida, writing to her and pleading with her not to abandon him, but she never replied.

External images
- A Few Small Nips (1935)
- My Nurse and I (1937)
- Four Inhabitants of Mexico (1938)

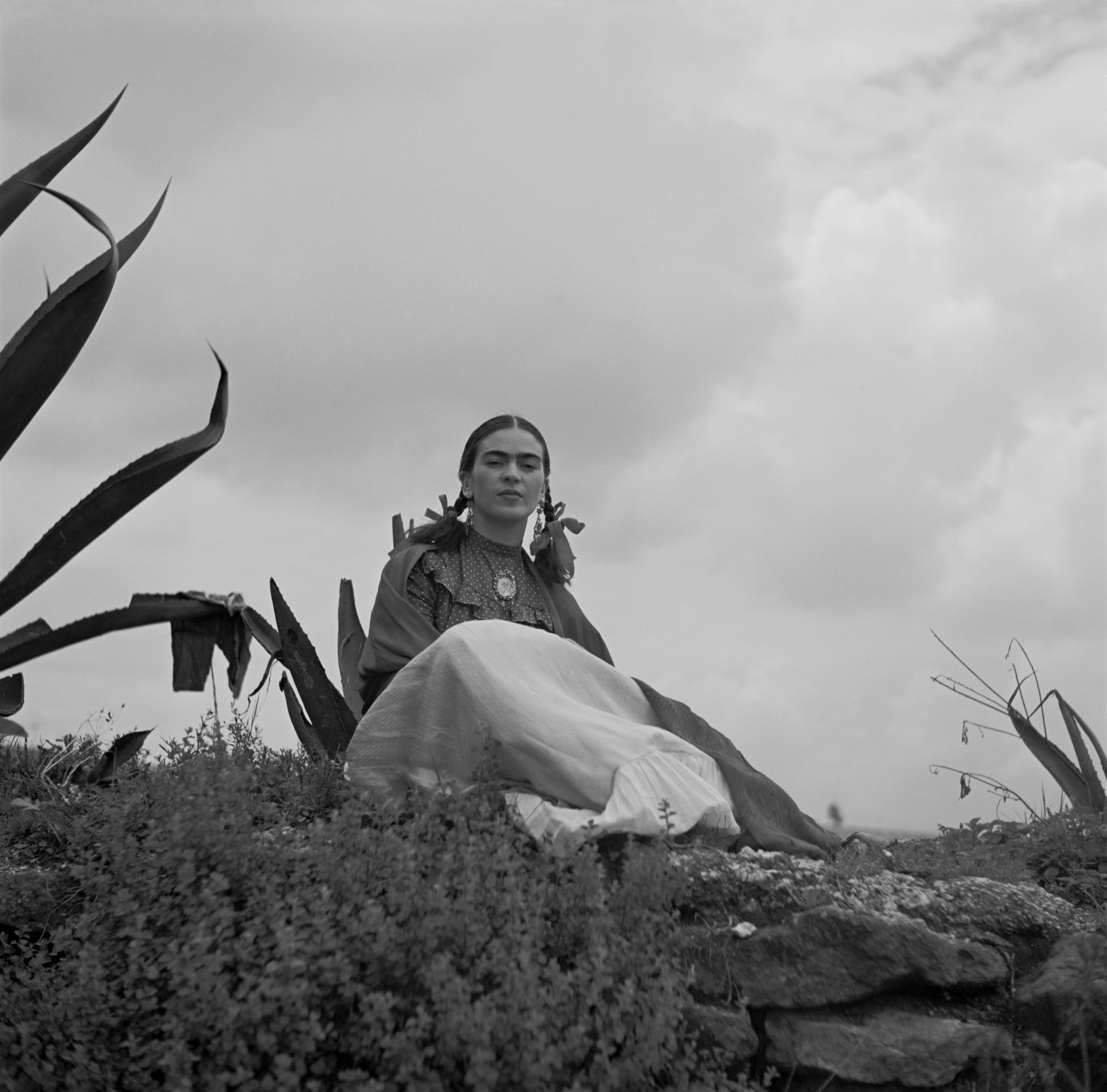
1937 photograph by Toni Frissell, from a fashion shoot for Vogue

After opening an exhibition in Paris, Kahlo sailed back to New York. She was eager to be reunited with Muray, but he decided to end their affair, as he had met another woman whom he was planning to marry. Kahlo traveled back to Mexico City, where Rivera requested a divorce from her. The exact reasons for his decision are unknown, but he stated publicly that it was merely a "matter of legal convenience in the style of modern times ... there are no sentimental, artistic, or economic reasons". According to their friends, the divorce was mainly caused by their mutual infidelities. He and Kahlo were granted a divorce in November 1939, but remained friendly; she continued to manage his finances and correspondence.

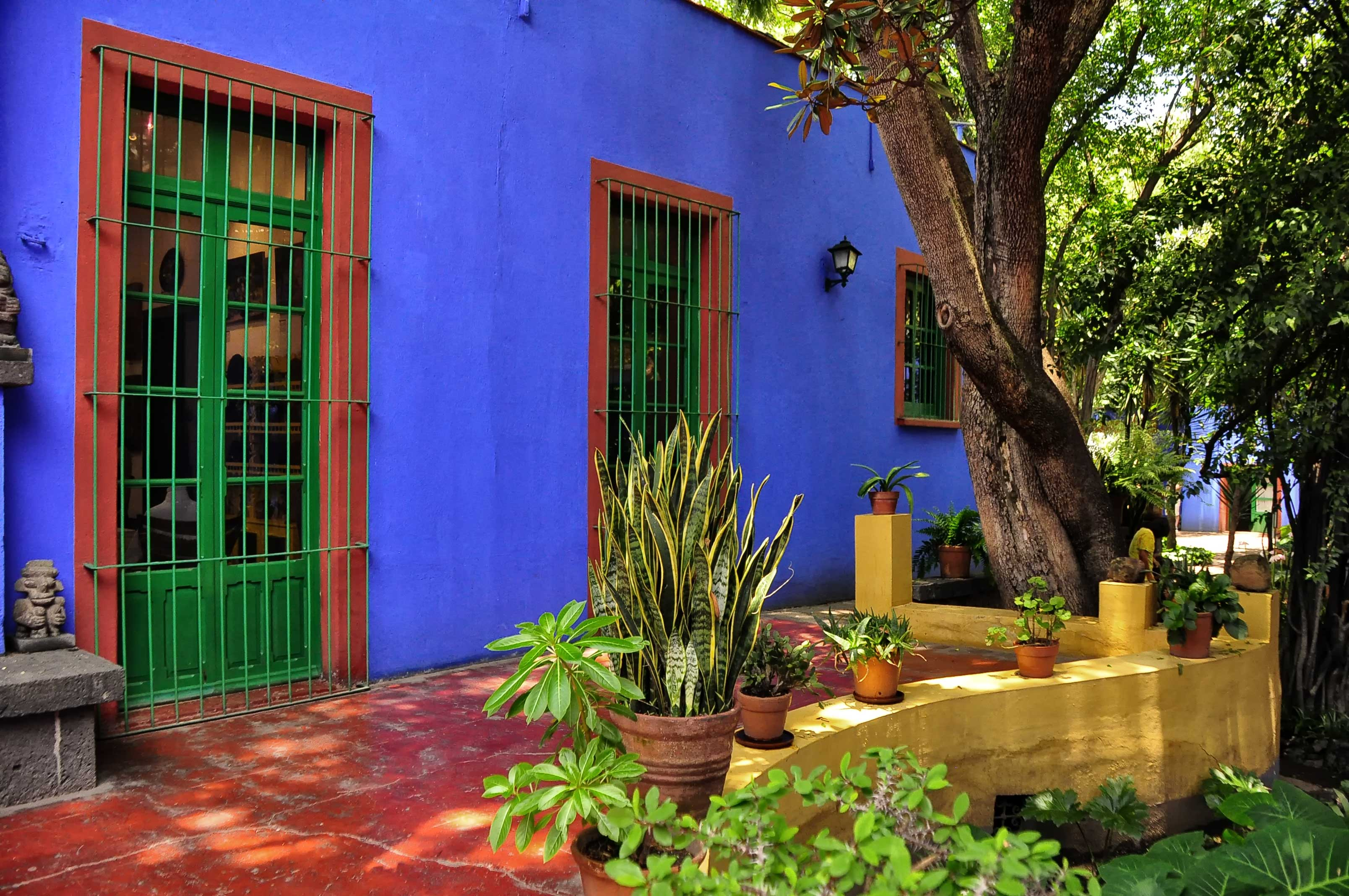
La Casa Azul, Kahlo's childhood home and residence from 1939 until her death in 1954

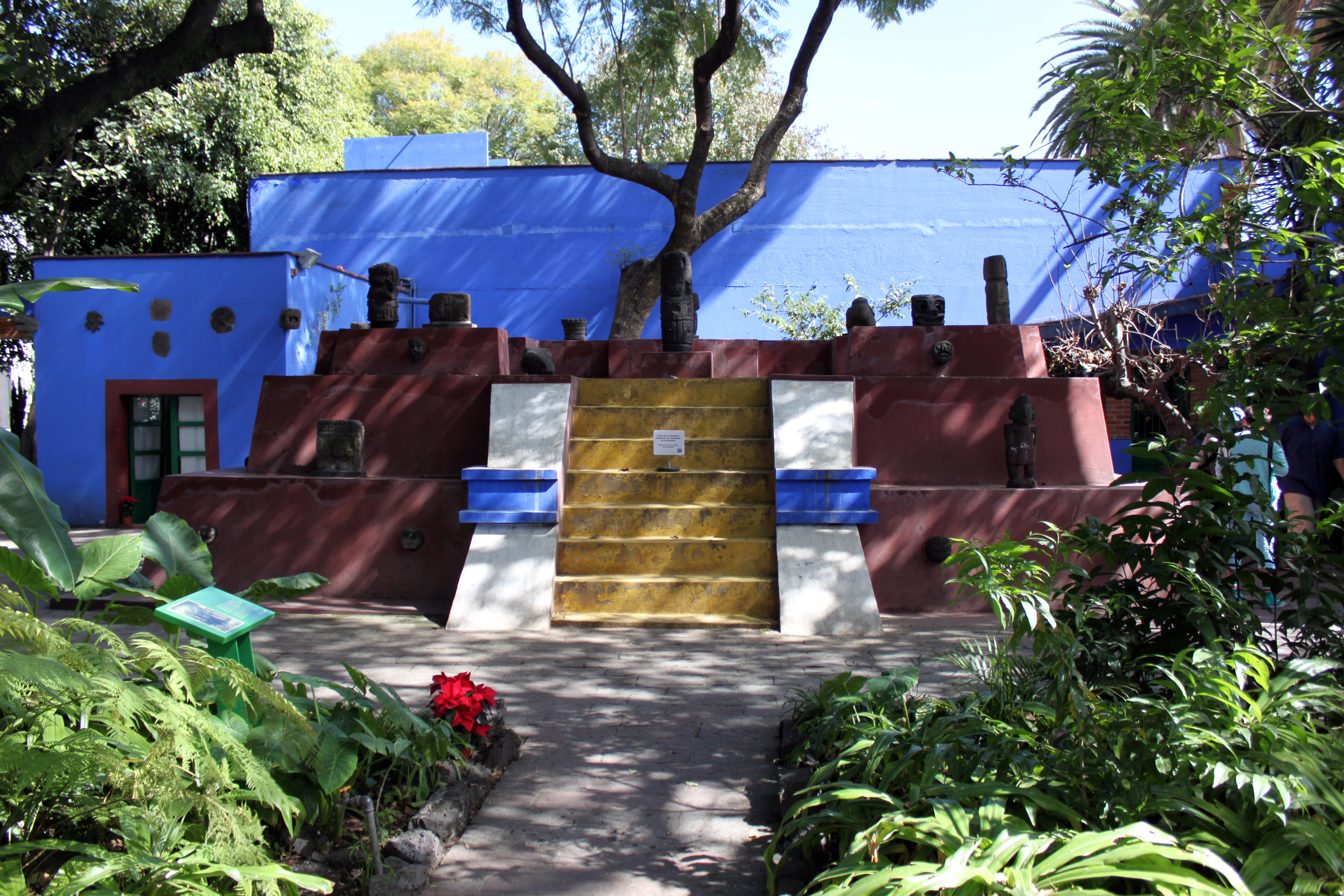
The garden at La Casa Azul

Following her separation from Rivera, Kahlo moved back to La Casa Azul and, determined to earn her own living, began another productive period as an artist, inspired by her experiences abroad. Encouraged by the recognition she was gaining, she moved from using the small and more intimate tin sheets she had used since 1932 to large canvases, as they were easier to exhibit. She also adopted a more sophisticated technique, limited the graphic details, and began to produce more quarter-length portraits, which were easier to sell. She painted several of her most famous pieces during this period, such as The Two Fridas (1939), Self-portrait with Cropped Hair (1940), The Wounded Table (1940), and Self-Portrait with Thorn Necklace and Hummingbird (1940). Three exhibitions featured her works in 1940: the fourth International Surrealist Exhibition in Mexico City, the Golden Gate International Exposition in San Francisco, and Twenty Centuries of Mexican Art in MoMA in New York.

On 21 August 1940, Trotsky was assassinated in Coyoacán, where he had continued to live after leaving La Casa Azul. Kahlo was briefly suspected of being involved, as she knew the murderer, and was arrested and held for two days with her sister Cristina. The following month, Kahlo traveled to San Francisco for medical treatment for back pain and a fungal infection on her hand. Her continuously fragile health had increasingly declined since her divorce and was exacerbated by her heavy consumption of alcohol.

Rivera was also in San Francisco after he fled Mexico City following Trotsky's murder and accepted a commission. Although Kahlo had a relationship with art dealer Heinz Berggruen during her visit to San Francisco, she and Rivera were reconciled. They remarried in a simple civil ceremony on 8 December 1940. Kahlo and Rivera returned to Mexico soon after their wedding. The union was less turbulent than before for its first five years. Both were more independent, and while La Casa Azul was their primary residence, Rivera retained the San Ángel house for use as his studio and second apartment. Both continued having extramarital affairs; Kahlo had affairs with both men and women.

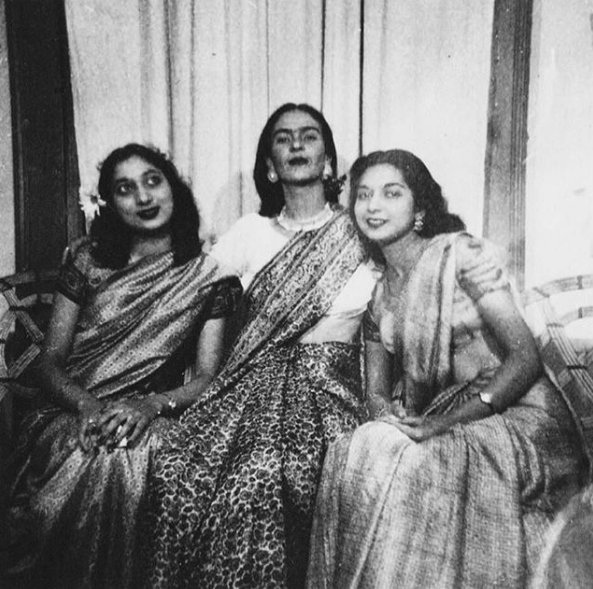
Kahlo (centre), Nayantara Sahgal (right) and Rita Dar at Casa Azul in 1947

Despite the medical treatment she had received in San Francisco, Kahlo's health problems continued throughout the 1940s. Due to her spinal problems, she wore twenty-eight separate supportive corsets, varying from steel and leather to plaster, between 1940 and 1954. She experienced pain in her legs, the infection on her hand had become chronic, and she was also treated for syphilis. The death of her father in April 1941 plunged her into a depression. Her ill health made her increasingly confined to La Casa Azul, which became the center of her world. She enjoyed taking care of the house and its garden, and was kept company by friends, servants, and various pets, including spider monkeys, Xoloitzcuintlis, and parrots.

While Kahlo was gaining recognition in her home country, her health continued to decline. By the mid-1940s, her back had worsened to the point that she could no longer sit or stand continuously. In June 1945, she traveled to New York for an operation which fused a bone graft and a steel support to her spine to straighten it. The difficult operation was a failure. According to biographer Hayden Herrera, Kahlo also sabotaged her recovery by not resting as required and by once physically re-opening her wounds in a fit of anger. Her paintings from this period, such as The Broken Column (1944), Without Hope (1945), Tree of Hope, Stand Fast (1946), and The Wounded Deer (1946), reflect her declining health.

=== 1950–1954: Last years and death ===
In 1950, Kahlo spent most of the year in Hospital ABC in Mexico City, where she underwent a new bone graft surgery on her spine. It caused a difficult infection and necessitated several follow-up surgeries. After being discharged, she was mostly confined to La Casa Azul, using a wheelchair and crutches to be ambulatory. During these final years of her life, Kahlo dedicated her time to political causes to the extent that her health allowed. She had rejoined the Mexican Communist Party in 1948 and campaigned for peace, for example, by collecting signatures for the Stockholm Appeal.

Kahlo's right leg was amputated at the knee due to gangrene in August 1953. She became severely depressed and anxious, and her dependence on painkillers escalated. When Rivera began yet another affair, she attempted suicide by overdose. She wrote in her diary in February 1954, "They amputated my leg six months ago, they have given me centuries of torture and at moments I almost lost my reason. I keep on wanting to kill myself. Diego is what keeps me from it, through my vain idea that he would miss me. ... But never in my life have I suffered more. I will wait a while..."

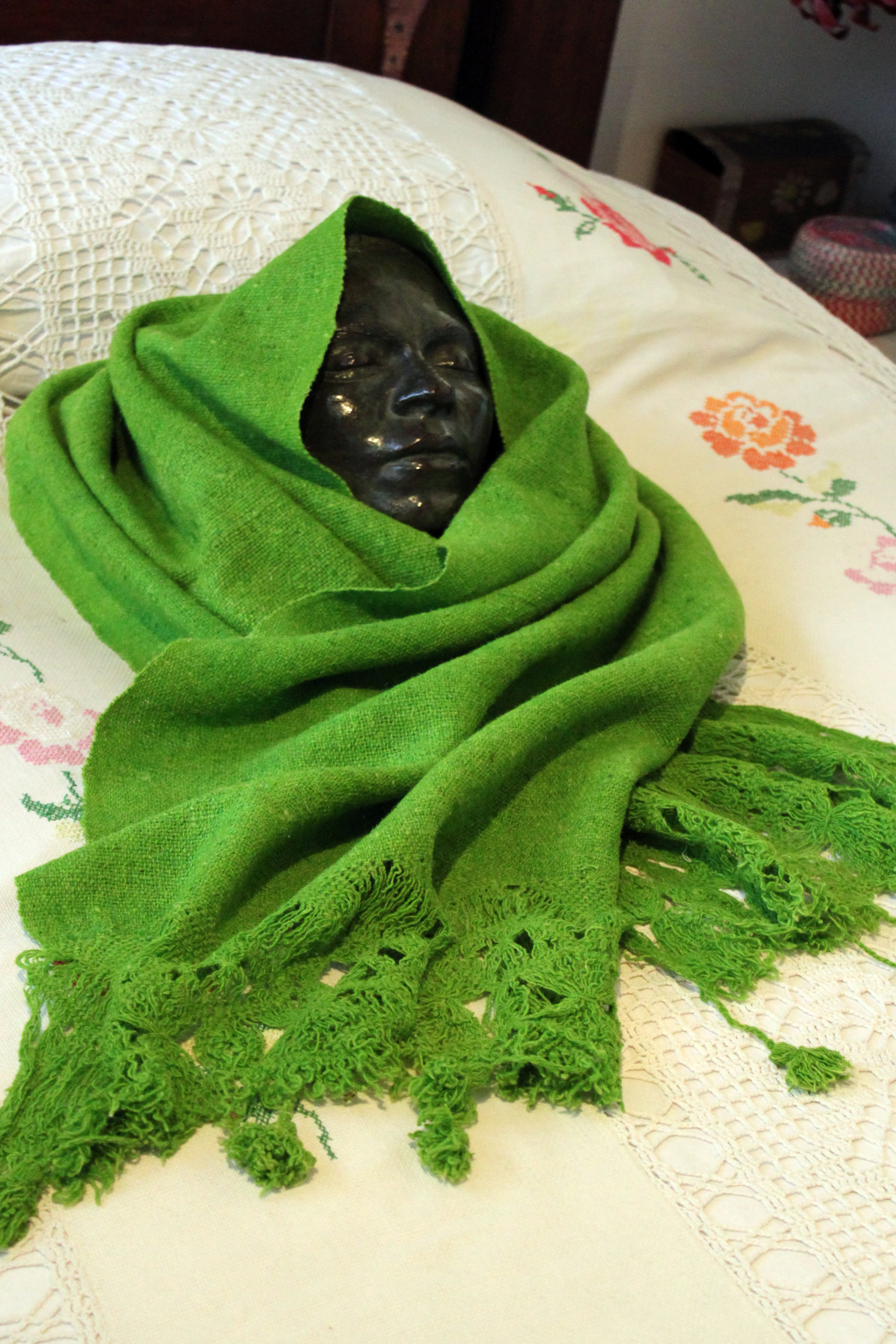
Kahlo's death mask on her bed in La Casa Azul

In her last days, Kahlo was mostly bedridden with bronchopneumonia, though she made a public appearance on 2 July 1954, participating with Rivera in a demonstration against the CIA invasion of Guatemala. She seemed to anticipate her death, as she spoke about it to visitors and drew skeletons and angels in her diary. The last drawing was a black angel, which biographer Hayden Herrera interprets as the Angel of Death. It was accompanied by the last words she wrote, "I joyfully await the exit – and I hope never to return – Frida" ("Espero Alegre la Salida – y Espero no Volver jamás").

The demonstration worsened her illness, and on the night of 12 July 1954, Kahlo had a high fever and was in extreme pain. At approximately 6 a.m. on 13 July 1954, her nurse found her dead in her bed. Kahlo was 47 years old. The official cause of death was pulmonary embolism, although no autopsy was performed. Herrera has argued that Kahlo, in fact, committed suicide. The nurse, who counted Kahlo's painkillers to monitor her drug use, stated that Kahlo had taken an overdose the night she died. She had been prescribed a maximum dose of seven pills but had taken eleven. She had also given Rivera a wedding anniversary present that evening, over a month in advance.

On the evening of 13 July, Kahlo's body was taken to the Palacio de Bellas Artes, where it lay in state under a Communist flag. The following day, it was carried to the Panteón Civil de Dolores, where friends and family attended an informal funeral ceremony. Hundreds of admirers stood outside. In accordance with her wishes, Kahlo was cremated in a fittingly spectacular fashion that, according to legend, saw the mourners witness her hair catching fire, her corpse sitting up, and her face forming one last seductive grin. Rivera, who stated that her death was "the most tragic day of my life", died three years later, in 1957. Kahlo's ashes are displayed in a pre-Columbian urn at La Casa Azul, which opened as a museum in 1958.

== Posthumous recognition and "Fridamania" ==
The twenty-first-century Frida is both a star – a commercial property complete with fan clubs and merchandising – and an embodiment of the hopes and aspirations of a near-religious group of followers. This wild, hybrid Frida, a mixture of tragic bohemian, Virgin of Guadalupe, revolutionary heroine and Salma Hayek, has taken such great hold on the public imagination that it tends to obscure the historically retrievable Kahlo.

— Art historian Oriana Baddeley on Kahlo

The Tate Modern considers Kahlo "one of the most significant artists of the twentieth century". Art historian Elizabeth Bakewell, has stated that Kahlo is "one of Mexico's most important twentieth-century figures". Kahlo's reputation as an artist developed late in her life and grew even further posthumously, as during her lifetime she was primarily known as the wife of Diego Rivera and as an eccentric personality among the international cultural elite. She gradually gained more recognition in the late 1970s when feminist scholars began to question the exclusion of female and non-Western artists from the art historical canon and the Chicano Movement lifted her as one of their icons. The first two books about Kahlo were published in Mexico by Teresa del Conde and Raquel Tibol in 1976 and 1977, respectively, and, in 1977, The Tree of Hope Stands Firm (1944) became the first Kahlo painting to be sold in an auction, netting $19,000 at Sotheby's. These milestones were followed by the first two retrospectives staged on Kahlo's oeuvre in 1978, one at the Palacio de Bellas Artes in Mexico City and another at the Museum of Contemporary Art in Chicago.

Two events were instrumental in raising interest in her life and art for the general public outside Mexico. The first was a joint retrospective of her paintings and Tina Modotti's photographs at the Whitechapel Gallery in London, which was curated and organized by Peter Wollen and Laura Mulvey. It opened in May 1982, and later traveled to Sweden, Germany, the United States, and Mexico. The second was the publication of art historian Hayden Herrera's international bestseller Frida: A Biography of Frida Kahlo in 1983.

By 1984, Kahlo's reputation as an artist had grown to such extent that Mexico declared her works part of the national cultural heritage, prohibiting their export from the country. As a result, her paintings seldom appear in international auctions, and comprehensive retrospectives are rare. Regardless, her paintings have still broken records for Latin American art in the 1990s and 2000s. In 1990, she became the first Latin American artist to break the one-million-dollar threshold when Diego and I was auctioned by Sotheby's for $1,430,000. In 2006, Roots (1943) reached US$5.6 million, and in 2016, Two Nudes in a Forest (1939) sold for $8 million.

Kahlo has attracted popular interest to the extent that the term "Fridamania" has been coined to describe the phenomenon. She is considered "one of the most instantly recognizable artists", whose face has been "used with the same regularity, and often with a shared symbolism, as images of Che Guevara or Bob Marley". Her life and art have inspired a variety of merchandise, and her distinctive look has been appropriated by the fashion world. A Hollywood biopic, Julie Taymor's Frida, was released in 2002. Based on Herrera's biography and starring Salma Hayek (who co-produced the film) as Kahlo, it grossed US$56 million worldwide and earned six Academy Award nominations, winning for Best Makeup and Best Original Score. The 2017 Disney-Pixar animation Coco also features a fictionalized Kahlo as a supporting character, voiced by Natalia Cordova-Buckley.

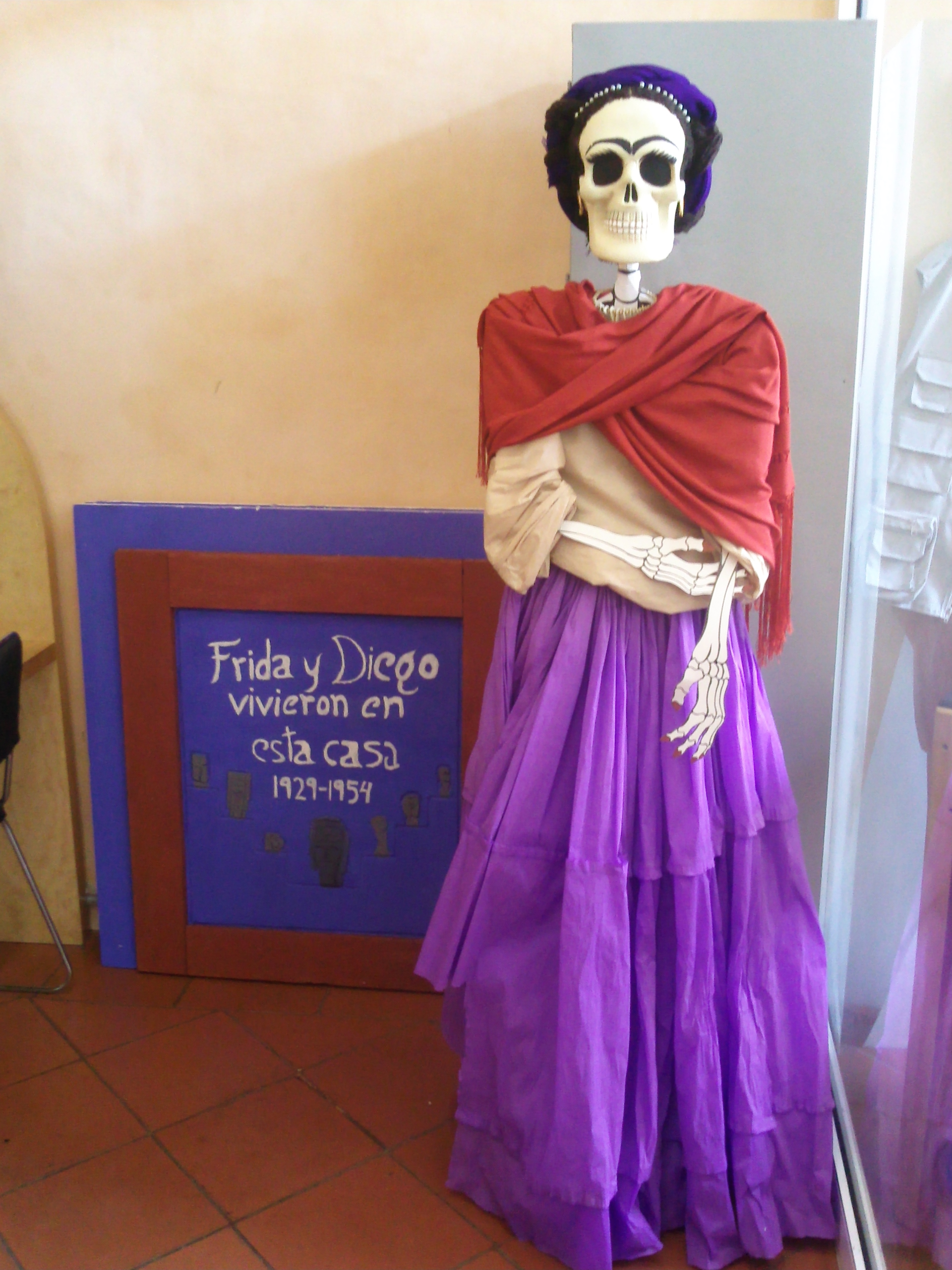
Effigy of Kahlo for Day of the Dead at the Museo Frida Kahlo

Kahlo's popular appeal is seen to stem first and foremost from a fascination with her life story, especially its painful and tragic aspects. She has become an icon for several minority groups and political movements, such as feminists, the LGBTQ community, and Chicanos. Oriana Baddeley has written that Kahlo has become a signifier of non-conformity and "the archetype of a cultural minority", who is regarded simultaneously as "a victim, crippled and abused" and as "a survivor who fights back". Edward Sullivan stated that Kahlo is hailed as a hero by so many because she is "someone to validate their own struggle to find their own voice and their own public personalities". According to John Berger, Kahlo's popularity is partly due to the fact that "the sharing of pain is one of the essential preconditions for a refinding of dignity and hope" in twenty-first century society. Kirk Varnedoe, the former chief curator of MoMA, has stated that Kahlo's posthumous success is linked to the way in which "she clicks with today's sensibilities – her psycho-obsessive concern with herself, her creation of a personal alternative world carries a voltage. Her constant remaking of her identity, her construction of a theater of the self are exactly what preoccupy such contemporary artists as Cindy Sherman or Kiki Smith and, on a more popular level, Madonna... She fits well with the odd, androgynous hormonal chemistry of our particular epoch."

Kahlo's posthumous popularity and the commercialization of her image have drawn criticism from many scholars and cultural commenters, who think that, not only have many facets of her life been mythologized, but the dramatic aspects of her biography have also overshadowed her art, producing a simplistic reading of her works in which they are reduced to literal descriptions of events in her life. According to journalist Stephanie Mencimer, Kahlo "has been embraced as a poster child for every possible politically correct cause" and

like a game of telephone, the more Kahlo's story has been told, the more it has been distorted, omitting uncomfortable details that show her to be a far more complex and flawed figure than the movies and cookbooks suggest. This elevation of the artist over the art diminishes the public understanding of Kahlo's place in history and overshadows the deeper and more disturbing truths in her work. Even more troubling, though, is that by airbrushing her biography, Kahlo's promoters have set her up for the inevitable fall so typical of women artists, that time when the contrarians will band together and take sport in shooting down her inflated image, and with it, her art."

Baddeley has compared the interest in Kahlo's life to the interest in the troubled life of Vincent van Gogh but has also stated that a crucial difference between the two is that most people associate Van Gogh with his paintings, whereas Kahlo is usually signified by an image of herself – an intriguing commentary on the way male and female artists are regarded. Similarly, Peter Wollen has compared Kahlo's cult-like following to that of Sylvia Plath, whose "unusually complex and contradictory art" has been overshadowed by simplified focus on her life.

=== Commemorations and characterizations ===
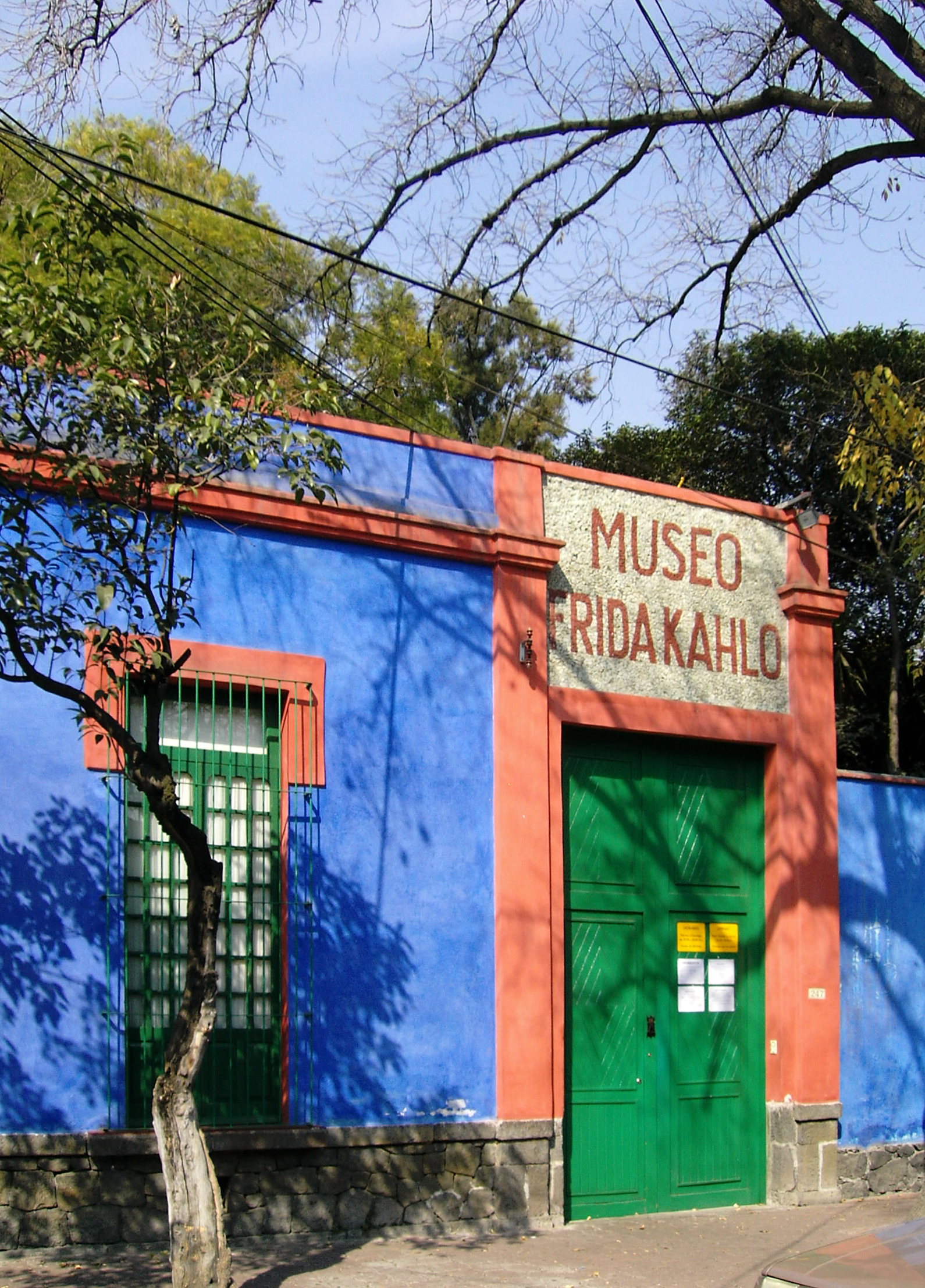
La Casa Azul, which has been open to the public since 1958 as a museum dedicated to Frida Kahlo

Kahlo's legacy has been commemorated in several ways. La Casa Azul, her home in Coyoacán, was opened as a museum in 1958, and has become one of the most popular museums in Mexico City, with approximately 25,000 visitors monthly. Also in Mexico City, Casa Roja, also called Museo Casa Kahlo, is where Kahlo's parents and later her sister Cristina once lived now turned into a museum focusing on Kahlo's family life. Mexico City also dedicated a park, Parque Frida Kahlo, to her in Coyoacán in 1985. The park features a bronze statue of Kahlo. In the United States, she became the first Hispanic woman to be honored with a U.S. postage stamp in 2001, and was inducted into the Legacy Walk, an outdoor public display in Chicago that celebrates LGBT history and people, in 2012.

Kahlo received several commemorations on the centenary of her birth in 2007, and some on the centenary of the birthyear she attested to, 2010. These included the Bank of Mexico releasing a new MXN$ 500-peso note, featuring Kahlo's painting titled Love's Embrace of the Universe, Earth, (Mexico), I, Diego, and Mr. Xólotl (1949) on the reverse of the note and Diego Rivera on the front. The largest retrospective of her works at Mexico City's Palacio de Bellas Artes attracted approximately 75,000 visitors.

In addition to other tributes, Kahlo's life and art have inspired artists in various fields. In 1984, Paul Leduc released a biopic titled Frida, naturaleza viva, starring Ofelia Medina as Kahlo. She is the protagonist of three fictional novels, Barbara Mujica's Frida (2001), Slavenka Drakulic's Frida's Bed (2008), and Barbara Kingsolver's The Lacuna (2009). In 1994, American jazz flautist and composer James Newton released an album titled Suite for Frida Kahlo. Scottish singer/songwriter, Michael Marra, wrote a song in homage to Kahlo titled "Frida Kahlo's Visit to the Taybridge Bar". In 2017, author Monica Brown and illustrator John Parra published a children's book on Kahlo, Frida Kahlo and her Animalitos, which focuses primarily on the animals and pets in Kahlo's life and art. In the visual arts, Kahlo's influence has reached wide and far: In 1996, and again in 2005, the Mexican Cultural Institute in Washington, DC coordinated an "Homage to Frida Kahlo" exhibition which showcased Kahlo-related artwork by artists from all over the world in Washington's Fraser Gallery. Additionally, notable artists such as Marina Abramovic, Alana Archer, Gabriela Gonzalez Dellosso, Yasumasa Morimura, Cris Melo, Rupert Garcia, and others have used or appropriated Kahlo's imagery into their own works.

Kahlo has also been the subject of several stage performances. Annabelle Lopez Ochoa choreographed a one-act ballet titled Broken Wings for the English National Ballet, which debuted in 2016, Tamara Rojo originated Kahlo in the ballet. Dutch National Ballet then commissioned Lopez Ochoa to create a full-length version of the ballet, Frida, which premiered in 2020, with Maia Makhateli as Kahlo. She also inspired three operas: Robert Xavier Rodriguez's Frida, which premiered at the American Music Theater Festival in Philadelphia in 1991; Kalevi Aho's Frida y Diego, which premiered at the Helsinki Music Centre in Helsinki, Finland in 2014; and Gabriela Lena Frank's El último sueño de Frida y Diego, which premiered at the San Diego Opera in 2022.

Kahlo was the main character in several plays, including Dolores C. Sendler's Goodbye, My Friduchita (1999), Robert Lepage and Sophie Faucher's La Casa Azul (2002), Humberto Robles' Frida Kahlo: Viva la vida! (2009), and Rita Ortez Provost's Tree of Hope (2014).

In 2014, Kahlo was one of the inaugural honorees in the Rainbow Honor Walk, a walk of fame in San Francisco's Castro neighborhood noting LGBTQ people who have "made significant contributions in their fields".

In 2018, Mattel unveiled seventeen new Barbie dolls in celebration of International Women's Day, including one of Kahlo. Critics objected to the doll's slim waist and noticeably missing unibrow.

In 2018, San Francisco Board of Supervisors unanimously voted to rename Phelan Avenue to Frida Kahlo Way. Frida Kahlo Way is the home of City College of San Francisco and Archbishop Riordan High School.

In 2019, a temporary mural of and called "Frida Kahlo" was painted by Rafael Blanco, for which he won a third-place prize at the Reno Mural Festival in Nevada.

Also in 2019, Frida's "Fantasmones Siniestros" ("Sinister Ghosts") was burned to ashes, publicizing an Ethereum NFT.

Also in 2019, Time created 89 new covers to celebrate women of the year starting from 1920; it chose Kahlo for 1938.

In 2022, as part of a collaboration with Centre Pompidou, Swatch released a watch based on The Frame.

== Selected quotes ==
Frida was a prolific writer, documenting her opinions, life and struggles in numerous illustrated journals, letters and other writings.

- "Painting has made my life full. Painting has replaced everything. I don't think there's anything better than work."
- "I paint self-portraits because I am so often alone, because I am the person I know best."
- "Fall in love with yourself, with life and then with whoever you want."
- "I am not sick. I am broken. But, I am happy to be alive as long as I can paint."

== Exhibitions ==
- 18 March–12 September 2026: Frida and Diego: The Last Dream at the Museum of Modern Art, New York, in a collaboration with the Metropolitan Opera and its new production of El Último Sueño de Frida y Diego.
- 18 January–17 May 2026: Frida: The Making of an Icon at the Museum of Fine Arts, Houston that examined "artist's transformation from a relatively unknown local painter to a universal icon and global brand." Then at Tate Modern, London, 25 June 2026–3 January 2027. Catalog by Mari Carmen Ramirez (ISBN 978-0-300-28636-6)
- 14 February–17 May 2026: Frida Kahlo – Sus Fotos at the El Paso Museum of Art, El Paso, Texas, displayed 241 unpublished photographs that represent diverse periods and people in the Kahlo's life.
- 6 September 2025–4 January 2026: Frida Kahlo: Through the Lens of Nickolas Muray at Museum of the Shenandoah Valley, Winchester, Virginia, displayed 50 photographs of Kahlo from 1937 to 1946.
- 14 June–5 October 2025: Frida Kahlo: Picturing an Icon at Washington County Museum of Fine Arts, Hagerstown, Maryland.
- 16 May–1 November 2025: Frida Kahlo: Art, Garden, Life at the New York Botanical Garden examined her connection with the natural world.
- 29 March–13 July 2025: Frida Kahlo's Month in Paris: A Friendship with Mary Reynolds at the Art Institute of Chicago which focused on Kahlo's short friendship with Mary Reynolds.
- 18 August 2024–23 February 2025: Frida: Beyond the Myth at Dallas Museum of Art consisted of more than 60 pieces including paintings, drawings, prints, and photos, intends to provide a fresh interpretation of the artist's persona. The exhibition was shown at the Virginia Museum of Fine Arts from 5 April–28 September 2025. The exhibit was co-curated by the both museums.
- 4 January 2022–present: Frida Kahlo: The Life of an Icon at Barangaroo Reserve, Sydney. Audio visual exhibition created by the Frida Kahlo Corporation.
- 13 August–5 December 2021: Frida and Me, Norton Museum of Art exhibit that showed Kahlo's influence on other artists.
- 6 March–30 May 2021: Frida Kahlo—An Intimate Portrait: The Photographic Albums at The Frick Art Museum, Pittsburgh, shows Kahlo in photographs taken by family and friends.
- 27 February–19 June 2019: Frida Kahlo and Arte Popular at Museum of Fine Arts, Boston, examined the influence of Mexican folk art on Kahlo's work.
- 8 February–12 May 2019: Frida Kahlo: Appearances Can Be Deceiving at the Brooklyn Museum. This was the largest U.S. exhibition in a decade devoted solely to the painter and the only U.S. show to feature her Tehuana clothing, hand-painted corsets and other never-before-seen items that had been locked away after the artist's death and rediscovered in 2004. Shown at the de Young Museum, San Francisco 25 September 2020 – 2 May 2021.
- 2019–2022: Frida Kahlo, Diego Rivera, and Mexican Modernism from the Jacques and Natasha Gelman Collection exhibited at the following:
  - 6 July–11 September 2022 Philbrook Museum of Art
  - 19 February 2022–5 June 2022 Portland Art Museum, Portland, Oregon
  - 23 October 2021–6 February 2022 Norton Museum of Art
  - 25 October 2020–25 January 2021 Denver Art Museum
  - 13 February 2020–7 September 2020 Musée national des beaux-arts du Québec
  - 12 October 2019–2 February 2020 North Carolina Museum of Art
  - 24 May–2 September 2019 Frist Art Museum
- 16 June–18 November 2018: Frida Kahlo: Making Her Self Up at the Victoria and Albert Museum in London. The basis for the later Brooklyn Museum exhibit.
- 25 October 2016–8 January 2017: Paint the Revolution: Mexican Modernism, 1910–1950, Philadelphia Museum of Art and Museum of Fine Arts, Houston 25 June–1 October 2017.
- 3 February–30 April 2016: Frida Kahlo: Paintings and Graphic Art From Mexican Collections at the Faberge Museum, St. Petersburg. Russia's first retrospective of Kahlo's work.
- 15 March–12 July 2015: Diego Rivera and Frida Kahlo in Detroit, Detroit Institute of Arts, Detroit, Michigan.
- 14 February–12 May 2013: Frida & Diego: Passion, Politics, and Painting at High Museum of Art, Atlanta.
- 1 May–31 July 2012: Mamacita Linda: Letters Between Frida Kahlo and Her Mother, National Museum of Women in the Arts, Washington, D.C.
- 27 October 2007–20 January 2008: Frida Kahlo an exhibition at the Walker Art Center, Minneapolis, Philadelphia Museum of Art, 20 February–18 May 2008; and the San Francisco Museum of Modern Art, 16 June–28 September 2008.
- 8 February–12 May 2002: Places of Their Own: Emily Carr, Georgia O'Keeffe, and Frida Kahlo, National Museum of Women in the Arts, Washington, D.C.
- 1–15 November 1938: Frida's first solo exhibit and New York debut at the Museum of Modern Art. Georgia O'Keeffe, Isamu Noguchi, and other prominent American artists attended the opening; approximately half of the paintings were sold.

== Gallery ==
Charola de amapolas, 1924, the first painting from Frida Kahlo

Portrait of Adriana, 1924

Naturaleza muerta, 1925

Paisaje urbano, 1925

Portrait of Alicia Galant, 1927

La Adelita, Pancho Villa, and Frida, 1927

Retrato de Miguel N. Lira, 1927

Si Adelita o Los Cachuchas, 1927

Portrait of Agustín Olmedo, 1927 or 1928

Retrato de Alejandro Gómez Arias, 1928

Dos mujeres, 1928

Retrato de Cristina, mi hermana, 1928

Niña con pato, 1928

Hucha y caballo negro, 1928

Niña con collar, 1929

Retrato de una niña, 1929

Retrato de una niña con lazo en la cintura, 1929

Retrato de Lupe Marín, 1929

Retrato de Miriam Penansky, 1929

La niña Virginia, 1929

Retrato de Isolda Pinedo, 1929

El tiempo vuela, 1929

The Bus, 1929

== See also ==
- Anahuacalli Museum
- List of paintings by Frida Kahlo
