= The Wounded Deer =

1946 painting by Frida Kahlo

- El venado herido
- Artist: Frida Kahlo
- Year: 1946
- Type: Oil on masonite
- Dimensions: 22.4 cm × 30 cm (8.8 in × 12 in)
- Owner: Private collection

The Wounded Deer (El venado herido in Spanish) is an oil painting by Mexican artist Frida Kahlo created in 1946. It is also known as The Little Deer. Through The Wounded Deer, Kahlo shares her enduring physical and emotional suffering with her audience, as she did throughout her creative oeuvre. This painting in particular was created towards the end of Kahlo's life, when her health was in decline. Kahlo combines pre-Columbian, Buddhist, and Christian symbols to express her wide spectrum of influences and beliefs.

Kahlo was injured at the age of 18 in a bus accident that resulted in serious injuries to her entire body. Her spine, ribs, pelvis, right leg, and abdomen were particularly damaged. She would deal with the injuries from this accident for the rest of her life. Kahlo painted this self-portrait after an operation on her spine, which would leave her bedridden for almost a year. During her recovery, she wore a steel corset, which can be seen in her late self-portraits. Her right leg would eventually be amputated up to her knee, as a result of gangrene.

The variety of cultural influences reflect Kahlo's own background. She had a German father and a Mexican mother, thus she was aware of traditional European and Mexican ideas during her childhood. It is also known that Kahlo was interested in Eastern Religion during the later years of her life.

In 1940, Kahlo married fellow Mexican artist Diego Rivera for the second time. Their second marriage saw many of the same problems as their first, filled with jealousy, affairs, and arguments.

Around the time she created The Wounded Deer, Kahlo made a drawing of a young deer in her diary, which is thought to be inspired by her pet deer, Granizo.

The Wounded Deer was given by Kahlo to close friends Arcady and Lina Boytler as a wedding gift.

== Description ==
In The Wounded Deer, Kahlo paints herself as an animal and human hybrid. She has the body of a deer along with antlers extending from her own head. The deer is standing up, its legs extended in action. Its front right leg is elevated off the ground, as though it is injured or in motion. In the deer's body are nine arrows, creating wounds from which blood flows. The deer is in a forest; nine trees are on the right of the deer, and a broken branch lies in the foreground. Only the tree trunks can be seen in the picture plane; none of the foliage above is visible. One of the branches on the tree in the right of the foreground is severed. It is probable that the detached limb is the branch located on the ground before the deer. The broken branch is prominent, as it is given more detail by the artist than all of the forest floor. Kahlo's face stares stoically at the viewer, showing little sign of pain. Her neck and head are upright and alert. A set of deer ears emerge from behind Kahlo's own. In the background a body of water is present, which can be seen through the trees. Though the sky is bright, a bolt of lightning strikes down from a white cloud. The word "carma" (karma) is written in the bottom left corner of the painting, after the artist's signature and the year of creation. The Wounded Deer is mostly rendered with green, brown, and gray tones, as well as small measures of blue and red. The painting's physical dimensions are very modest, measuring at only 22.4 x 30 centimeters.

== Interpretation and analysis ==
In this painting, Kahlo shares her lifelong splanchnic pain with her audience. The pain she represents is not only physical, but emotional torment caused by her relationship with Rivera. Compared to the grand murals of other Mexican contemporaries, such as Rivera, David Alfaro Siqueiros, and José Clemente Orozco, Kahlo's paintings were small. Some critics interpret the scale of her works as a sign of isolation, which also downplays her painful circumstances.

It is Mexican tradition to place a broken branch on a grave. This is taken as an acknowledgement of the artist's deteriorating health. Despite the wounds on the body of the deer, Kahlo does not paint a face of anguish, but of strength.

Scholars point out that the antlers on Kahlo's head are those of a stag, a male deer. Kahlo is representing herself as part male and part female, as well as elements of human and animal features. This hybrid form is often explained by the artist's influence of pre-Columbian ideas and traditions, which hold the belief that the right foot is represented by a deer. In this belief system, days were represented by a symbol and a number which preferably would be caused by the great number of the tree branches. Important dates such as birthdays which were used in predictions could also be used. Kahlo adopted the deer as a symbol for herself because of its connection to the right foot, and in the Aztec calendar, she was born on day nine. These two symbols together were not good, as nine was a symbol for earthly elements as well as the underworld, which was made up of nine phases. The number nine can be seen twice in The Wounded Deer: there are nine trees in the left side, before the clearing that reveals the ocean and lightning bolt, as well as nine arrows protruding from the body of the deer. An additional nine can be seen in the points of her antlers, if counted together.

In the painting, the deer's front right leg is raised off the ground, perhaps in a reflection of Kahlo's own impairment. At the time she painted The Wounded Deer, Kahlo had difficulty walking, which she would attempt to correct through a spinal surgery later that year.

Some art historians believe that Kahlo's decision to portray herself with male and female features is a reflection of her own sexuality. This perception recognizes her bisexuality. Other interpretations of the figure relate the male and female elements, referred to as hermaphroditic, to pre-Columbian Aztec beliefs that hold relationships between animals and parts of the human body. The meaning of the word "carma", painted in the lower left corner of the painting, is controversial. It was Kahlo's own belief that her life was planned out by destiny or fate, and therefore she could not prevent any of the difficulties she faced. Consequently, her misfortune must have been caused by deeds from her previous lives.

An influence of Christianity is also integrated through reference to the story of Saint Sebastian, a martyr who was tied to a tree and shot by arrows.

The pre-Columbian, Buddhist, and Christian symbols combine to reflect Kahlo's multi-cultural reality – a reality which also represents a spectrum of gender possibilities. She renders herself with these juxtaposing features to explore the concept of the self. Through these changes, identity is seen as dynamic and complex, not a fixed state.

== See also ==
- List of paintings by Frida Kahlo
