= Mary Reynolds (artist) =

American artist and bookbinder

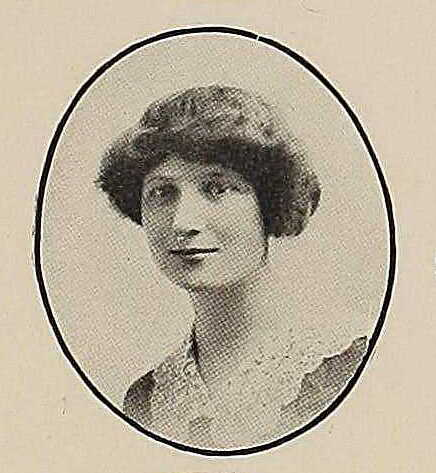
- Born: October 19, 1891
- Died: September 30, 1950 (aged 58) rue Hallé, Paris
- Education: Vassar College
- Occupation: Artist

Mary Louise Hubacheck Reynolds (née Hubacheck; 1891 – September 30, 1950) was an American artist and bookbinder. She was notable for her romantic partnership and artistic collaboration with artist Marcel Duchamp, as well as her role in supporting the French Resistance during the Nazi Occupation in Paris.

== Early life ==
She was born in 1891 in Minneapolis, Minnesota. She came from a well-off family, and attended public schools in Minneapolis during her childhood. In 1909, she moved to the east coast to study at Vassar College, graduating with a Bachelor of Arts in 1913. After she graduated, she returned to Minneapolis and attended post-graduate courses at the University of Minnesota.

Around her time spent studying at University of Minnesota, she met Matthew Givens Reynolds. They married on July 24, 1916. During their engagement, he received a job offer in New York. They moved to New York and settled in Greenwich Village, where she was exposed to the New York bohemian arts scene at the time. She first met Marchel Duchamp during her time in New York. In November 1917, her husband enlisted in World War I. While he survived combat, he died of influenza in Europe on January 10, 1919 – leaving her a widow. After her husband's death, she briefly returned to Minneapolis. Her family encouraged her to settle down again and remarry, but she found this an unsatisfying option in the wake of her husband's death. She left for Paris in April 1921, settling in Montparnasse.

== Parisian life ==
Once settled in Paris, she quickly became a popular socialite due to her association with novelist, painter, and poet Laurence Vail. In 1923, she became reacquainted with Marchel Duchamp through her relations to the Paris Social scene. They began to form a relationship. Duchamp, however, was not faithful and pursued relations with other women during this time. Though they never married, from 1927 the two lived in close relation – living together, vacationing together, and being seen in public together.

In 1929, Reynolds took up bookbinding at the Atelier of master French binder Pierre Legrain. Legrain's style of binding was notably modernist in contrast to the prior tradition of French book binding which was more deferential to a classical style. Legrain's influence, as well as that of Duchamp, led Reynolds to adopt a relatively avant-garde style of book binding, influenced by French Surrealism. She produced many bindings herself, as well as a few in collaboration with Duchamp, such as their collaboration on a binding for Alfred Jarry’s Ubu Roi.

During 1930s, her relationship stabilized with Duchamp. During this time she actively worked as a bookbinder and continued to collaborate with Duchamp. Though she did not share a working studio with Duchamp, their mutual house was considered itself an extravagant aesthetic affair and frequently hosted the literati and artists of the time.

This lasted until the Nazi occupation of Paris, which made it difficult for their relationship. Duchamp left for the unoccupied parts of France, urging Reynolds to join him. She refused, saying that the occupation posed little issue to her life, she wrote to Duchamp: “Don't worry, no torture, no boats for six months....Conditions acceptable here and no excitement.” Duchamp eventually left for New York in 1942.

During the early 1940s, Reynolds played an active role in The French Resistance. She also provided financial support for a variety of friends throughout the occupation. Notably, she helped the artist Jean Hélion hide from the Nazis after he escaped from a German prisoners camp in 1942. By late 1942, she became aware that she was under Gestapo surveillance and planned to leave occupied Paris. She escaped into Spain by crossing the Pyrenees. After some difficulties, she arrived in Madrid on December 14, 1942. On January 6, 1943, she returned to New York via aircraft.

== Later life ==
She and Duchamp lived together in Greenwich Village until 1945, where longing for her old life in Paris, she left for Paris six weeks after the war ended in 1945. Duchamp joined her briefly, but eventually left in 1947. During this time period, her interest in bookbinding waned, and between 1945 and 1947, she primarily worked as a Paris representative for the arts magazine View. Her health gradually waned from the stresses taken during her escape from the occupation, and in April 1950 she checked into the American Hospital in Neuilly. She was found to be suffering from endometrial cancer. On September 30, 1950, she died from endometrial cancer in her home in Paris, with Marcel Duchamp at her side.
