= 1935 in art =

Events from the year 1935 in art.

== Events ==
- January – First issue of Axis, a quarterly review of abstract art edited by Myfanwy Piper in England, is published.
- February 15–March 2 – The National Association for the Advancement of Colored People stages an exhibition Art Commentary on Lynching in New York City.
- May 6 – The Royal Academy Exhibition of 1935 opens at Burlington House in London
- May 7 – Artists' Unit group of British modernists announced, superseding Unit One.
- December – Elfriede Lohse-Wächtler undergoes forced sterilization in accordance with Nazi eugenics policies and never paints again.
- Gemeentemuseum Den Haag, designed by Hendrik Petrus Berlage, completed in the Netherlands.
- William Coldstream edits the GPO Film Unit documentary Coal Face.
- Picasso's poetry takes precedence over his graphic work this year.

== Works ==
- Pierre Bonnard – Nude in the Bathtub
- Alessandro Bruschetti – Fascist Synthesis
- Óscar Domínguez – Le Dimanche
- Gerardo Dottori – Fascist Creations
- Jacob Epstein – Ecce Homo (marble)
- M. C. Escher – Hand with Reflecting Sphere (lithograph)
- James Earle Fraser – sculptures, Washington, D.C.
  - Guardianship
  - Heritage
- Frida Kahlo
  - A Few Small Nips (Unos cuantos piquetitos)
  - Self-Portrait with Curly Hair
- Fernand Léger – Two Sisters
- L. S. Lowry – The Fever Van
- René Magritte
  - The Discovery of Fire
  - The Human Condition (second version)
  - The Portrait
- Joan Miró
  - Man and Woman in Front of a Pile of Excrement
  - Metamorphosis
- Alfred Munnings – My Wife, My Horse and Myself
- Paul Nash – Equivalents for the Megaliths
- Algernon Newton – The Surrey Canal, Camberwell
- Pablo Picasso – Jeune Fille Endormie
- Candido Portinari – Coffee
- Diego Rivera – The Spanish Conquest of Mexico
- William Rothenstein – Barn at Cherington, Gloucestershire
- Amrita Sher-Gil
  - Camels
  - Hill Women
  - Three Girls
- Kārlis Zāle – Freedom Monument (Riga, Latvia)

== Awards ==
- Archibald Prize: John Longstaff – A B ('Banjo') Paterson
- Knighthood: William Reid Dick

== Births ==
- 2 January – David McKee, English author and illustrator (d. 2022)
- 12 January – Teresa del Conde, Mexican art critic and historian (d. 2017)
- 26 January – Paula Rego, Portuguese-born painter (d. 2022)
- 10 February
  - John Alcorn, American illustrator (d. 1992)
  - Konrad Klapheck, German painter (d. 2023)
- 1 June – Vladislav Lalicki, Serbian painter (d. 2008)
- 13 June – Christo and Jeanne-Claude, Bulgarian & Moroccan-born American installation artists (d. 2020 & 2009 respectively)
- 22 June – Floyd Norman, American animator, writer and comic book artist
- 19 August – Victor Ambrus, Hungarian-born British illustrator (d. 2021)
- 23 August – Roy Strong, English art historian and curator
- 8 September – William Vance, Belgian comics artist (d. 2018)
- 16 September – Carl Andre, American minimalist artist (d. 2024)
- 26 September – Juan Zanotto, Italian-born Argentine comic book artist (d. 2005)
- 30 September – James McKendry, Northern Irish sculptor and painter
- 1 October – Walter De Maria, American minimalist, conceptual artist and land artist (d. 2013)
- 3 October – Sinikka Kurkinen, Finnish painter
- 9 October – Don McCullin, English war photographer
- Full date unknown
  - Nina Alovert, Russian-born American ballet photographer
  - Rasheed Araeen, Pakistan-born British conceptual artist
  - Félix Aráuz, Ecuadorean painter (d. 2024)
  - John Barry, English film set designer (d. 1979)

== Deaths ==
- February 8 – Max Liebermann, German-Jewish impressionist painter (b. 1847)
- February 16 – Carolina Benedicks-Bruce, Swedish sculptor (b. 1856)
- March 25 – William de Leftwich Dodge, American muralist (b. 1867)
- April 15 – Anna Ancher, Danish member of the Skagen Painters group (b. 1859)
- April 22 – Frederick Farrell, Scottish watercolourist, war artist, pneumonia (b. 1882)
- May 3 – Jessie Willcox Smith, American illustrator (b. 1863)
- May 15 – Kazimir Malevich, Polish-Russian painter, art theoretician (b. 1879)
- May 24 – Granville Redmond, American landscape painter (b. 1871)
- July 17 – George William Russell ('Æ'), Irish critic, poet and painter (b. 1867)
- August 15 – Paul Signac, French neo-impressionist painter (b. 1863)
- August 27 – Childe Hassam, American impressionist painter (b. 1859)
- October 2 – Georg Jensen, Danish silversmith (b. 1866)
- October 4 – Jean Béraud, French painter (b. 1849)
- October 9 – Archibald Thorburn, Scottish-born wildlife painter (b. 1860)
- October 11 – Samuel Peploe, Scottish painter (b. 1871)
- October 18 – Gaston Lachaise, French-American sculptor (b. 1882)
- October 23 – Charles Demuth, American painter (b. 1883)
- November 28 – Joaquín Clausell, Mexican impressionist landscape painter, lawyer and political activist (b. 1866)
- Undated
  - Harry Fidler, English painter (b. 1856)
  - Eva Watson-Schütze, American portrait photographer and curator (b. 1867)

== See also ==
- 1935 in fine arts of the Soviet Union
