= 1933 in art =

Events from the year 1933 in art.

== Events ==
- January 12 – George Grosz emigrates from Nazi Germany to the United States.
- February 11 – LAPD Red Squad destroys artwork at John Reed Club in Los Angeles.
- February/March – Käthe Kollwitz is forced by the Nazi Party in Germany to resign from the faculty of the Academy of Arts, Berlin.
- April
  - Closure of the Bauhaus.
  - Freddy Mayor opens a gallery in Cork Street, London, specialising in modernism.
- May – The mural Man at the Crossroads by Diego Rivera at the Rockefeller Center in New York is covered up because it contains a portrait of Lenin. While Rivera has been working on it, he has been joined in the United States by Frida Kahlo who begins her painting My Dress Hangs There.
- June 12 – Paul Nash, in a letter to The Times of London, announces formation of the group Unit One by young British artists to promote modernism in Britain.
- July – New Midland Hotel, Morecambe, on the Lancashire coast of England, designed by Oliver Hill, is opened incorporating sculpture by Eric Gill and murals by Eric Ravilious and Edward Bawden.
- September/October – "Henri Cartier-Bresson and an Exhibition of Anti-Graphic Photography" staged at Julien Levy's gallery in New York City.
- September – Artists Union formed in the United States as the Emergency Work Bureau Artists Group.
- December 12 – Scholars of the Warburg Institute in Hamburg resolve to relocate from Nazi Germany to London.
- Black Mountain College founded by John Andrew Rice.
- Hans Bellmer produces his first Doll sculpture.
- Barbara Hepworth and John Skeaping are divorced; Hepworth is already in a relationship with Ben Nicholson.
- Kenneth Clark appointed Director of the National Gallery, London, at age 30, taking up his post in January 1934.
- December – The NBC photomural by Margaret Bourke-White is installed at Rockefeller Center in New York. It is the largest photomural in the world at the time.

== Works ==
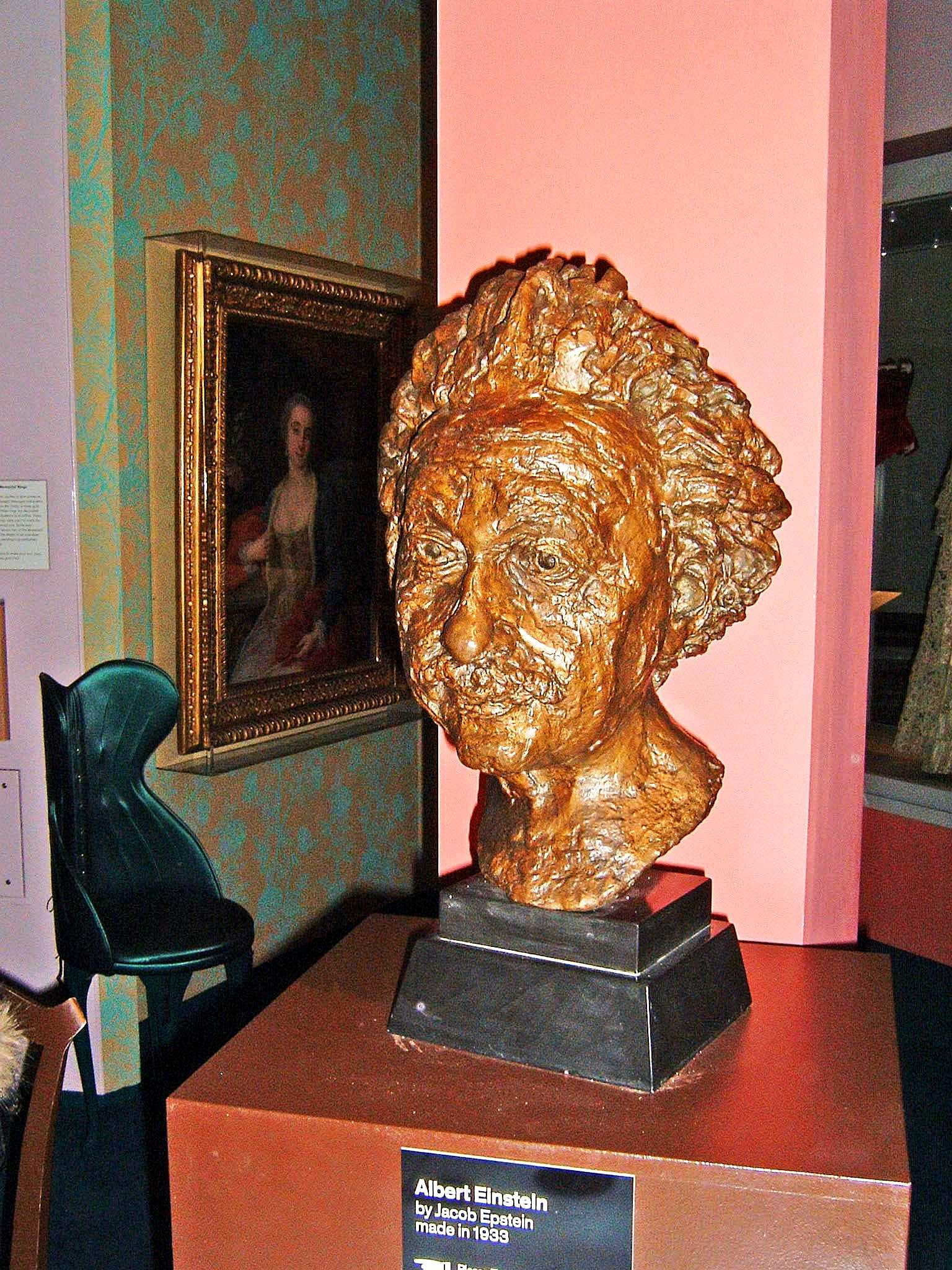
Jacob Epstein – Bust of Albert Einstein

- Jean Arp – Head and Shell (bronze)
- Francis Bacon – Crucifixion
- Renato Bertelli – Profilo continuo del Duce (Continuous profile of Mussolini, ceramic bust)
- Gutzon Borglum – Statue of Harvey W. Scott (bronze, Portland, Oregon)
- Bill Brandt – Parlourmaid and Under-Parlourmaid Ready to Serve Dinner (documentary photograph)
- Charles Cundall – Bank Holiday, Brighton
- Tarsila do Amaral – Operarios
- Jacob Epstein
  - Man of Aran (portrait bust of 'Tiger' King)
  - Primeval Gods / Sun God (double-sided Hoptonwood stone carving)
  - Portrait busts of Lord Beaverbrook, Prof. Albert Einstein, Robert Flaherty, John Gielgud and Dr Chaim Weizmann
- James Gunn – Eleanor Rathbone
- C. Paul Jennewein
  - Spirit of Justice (sculpture, Department of Justice Building, Washington, D.C.)
  - Western Civilization (pediment sculpture, Philadelphia Museum of Art)
- Frida Kahlo
  - My Dress Hangs There (Allá cuelga mi vestido)
  - Self-portrait – Very Ugly (Autorretrato – muy fea)
- André Kertész – Distortions (photographs)
- René Magritte
  - Elective Affinities
  - The Human Condition (first version)
- Piet Mondrian – Composition with Yellow Lines
- Tom Monnington – Admiral of the Fleet Sir John Jellicoe
- Hilda Rix Nicholas – The Summer House (approximate date)
- Konstantinos Parthenis – The Apotheosis of Athanasios Diakos
- Pablo Picasso – Minotaur Kneeling over Sleeping Girl (etching)
- Gabriel Pippet – mosaic interior decoration, Church of the Sacred Heart and St Catherine of Alexandria, Droitwich Spa, England (completed)
- Diego Rivera
  - Detroit Industry Murals (frescoes for Detroit Institute of Arts)
  - Man at the Crossroads (mural, original version for Rockefeller Center, New York, destroyed)
- Percy Shakespeare
  - Mephistopheles
  - A Mulatto
- Amrita Sher-Gil
  - Professional Model
  - Reclining Nude
  - Sleep
- John Skeaping – Horse (sculpture in mahogany and pynkado, originally in Whipsnade Zoo; later in Tate Gallery)
- Carel Willink – The Zeppelin

== Awards ==
- Archibald Prize: Charles Wheeler – Ambrose Pratt

== Births ==
=== January to June ===
- February 8 – Richard Allen, British minimalist op artist and printmaker (d. 1999)
- February 18 – Yoko Ono, Japanese-born sculptor, filmmaker, installation artist and musician
- February 22 – Joseph Raffael, painter (d. 2021)
- February 27
  - Ansgar Elde, Swedish ceramic artist (d. 2000)
  - Edward Lucie-Smith, British art critic and poet
- March 4 – John Mills, English sculptor (d. 2023)
- March 10 – Abdul Hay Mosallam Zarara, Palestinian artist (d. 2020)
- March 17 – Stass Paraskos, Greek Cypriot painter (d. 2014)
- March 29 – Roger von Gunten, Swiss-born Mexican artist and sculptor (d. 2026)
- April 1 – Dan Flavin, American minimalist artist (d. 1996)
- April 9 – René Burri, Swiss photographer (d. 2014)
- April 15 – David Hamilton, English photographer (d. 2016)
- April 23 – Roger Wittevrongel, Belgian artist
- April 29 – Alison Knowles, American Fluxus performance artist, sound artist, papermaker and printmaker
- June 11 – Harald Szeemann, Swiss curator and art historian (d. 2005)
- June 12 – Eddie Adams, American Pulitzer Prize-winning photographer (d. 2004)
- June 23
  - Michelangelo Pistoletto, Italian object artist, action painter and art theorist
  - Hermenegildo Sábat, Uruguayan-Argentine caricaturist (d. 2018)

=== July to December ===
- 8 July – Jeff Nuttall, English poet, publisher, actor, painter and sculptor (d. 2004)
- 18 July – Cécile Guillame, first woman to engrave French postal stamps (d. 2004)
- 21 July – Laila Pullinen, Finnish sculptor (d. 2015)
- 18 August – Michael Baxandall, Welsh art historian (d. 2008)
- August 29 – Sorel Etrog, Romanian-born Canadian sculptor, writer and philosopher (d. 2014)
- September 18 – Mark di Suvero, Chinese-born Italian American abstract expressionist sculptor
- September 30 – Ilya Kabakov, Soviet-born conceptual artist (d. 2023)
- October 9 – Bill Tidy, British cartoonist and illustrator (d. 2023)
- October 12 – Guido Molinari, Canadian artist (d. 2004)
- October 23 – Juraj Bartusz, Slovak sculptor (d. 2025)
- October 28
  - Audrey Amiss, English artist (d. 2013)
  - Michael Noakes, English portrait painter (d. 2018)
- October 29 – Sydney Ball, Australian abstract painter (d. 2017)
- November 8 – Lothar Fischer, German sculptor (d. 2004)
- November 18
  - Bruce Conner, American artist in experimental film, drawing, sculpture, painting, collage and photography (d. 2008)
  - Charlotte Moorman, American Fluxus performance artist (d. 1991)
- November 29 – James Rosenquist, American painter and muralist (d. 2017)
- November 30 – Sam Gilliam, American painter (d. 2022)
- December 14 – Bapu, Indian film director, cartoonist and painter (d. 2014)

=== Full date of birth unknown ===
- John Stuart Ingle, American realist watercolorist (d. 2010)

== Deaths ==
- January 10 – Margaret Macdonald Mackintosh, Scottish designer (b. 1865)
- January 17 – Louis Comfort Tiffany, American stained glass artist (b. 1848)
- February 3 – Anne de Rochechouart de Mortemart, Duchesse d'Uzès, French patron and sculptor (b. 1847)
- February 22 – Archibald Knox, Manx designer (b. 1864)
- February 28 – Lilla Cabot Perry, American Impressionist painter (b. 1848)
- March 9 – Joakim Skovgaard, Danish painter (b. 1856)
- March 10 – Émile André, French architect and designer (b. 1871)
- April 16 – Harold Peto, English architect and garden designer (b. 1854)
- May 6 – François Pompon, French sculptor (b. 1856)
- May 25 – James E. Kelly, American sculptor and illustrator (b. 1855)
- June 14 – Hans Prinzhorn, German art historian (b. 1886)
- August 5 – Charles Harold Davis, American landscape painter (b. 1856)
- August 8 – Adolf Loos, Austrian Modernist architect (b. 1870)
- September 27 – Zaida Ben-Yusuf, American portrait photographer (b. 1869)
- October 2 – Elizabeth Thompson, British painter (b. 1846)
- October 24 – Annie Swynnerton, English painter (b. 1844)
- October 26 – José Malhoa, Portuguese painter (b. 1855)
- October 29 – George Luks, American realist painter (b. 1867)
- November 12 – F. Holland Day, American photographer (b. 1864)
- November 14 – Thomas Hayton Mawson, English garden designer (b. 1861)
- November 15 – Émile-Jacques Ruhlmann, French furniture designer (b. 1879)
- November 19 – Louise Jopling, English painter (b. 1843)
- December 4 – W. G. R. Sprague, British theatre designer (b. 1863)
- date unknown – Susan Isabel Dacre, English painter (b. 1844)

== See also ==
- 1933 in fine arts of the Soviet Union
