= Royal Academy Exhibition of 1938 =

1938 art exhibition in London

Evening on the Bridge by Stanhope Forbes

The Royal Academy Exhibition of 1938 was the hundred and seventieth annual Summer Exhibition of the British Royal Academy of Arts which was held at Burlington House in London's Piccadilly from 2 May to 6 August 1938.

A controversy broke out over the Hanging's Committee's rejection of Portrait of T. S. Eliot by Wyndham Lewis, prompting Augustus John to resign his membership. Building in Berkeley Square by Charles Cundall was acquired for the Tate Gallery through the Chantrey Bequest The Coronation of King George VI by Frank O. Salisbury depicted the ceremony held the previous year in Westminster Abbey.

Stanhope Forbes, a founder of the Newlyn School, sent in several of his characteristic plein air scenes of Cornish life including Evening on the Bridge. Alfred Munnings, best known for his horse racing pictures, exhibited six paintings. This included Their Majesties' Return from Ascot. which he had previously displayed at the Royal Academy Exhibition of 1926 and was now acquired for the nation. Algernon Newton's Outskirts of Cheltenham was also displayed.

== Bibliography ==
- Goodman, Jean. AJ: The Life of Alfred Munnings. Erskine Press, 2019.
- Spalding, Frances. The Real and the Romantic: English Art Between Two World Wars Thames and Hudson, 2022.
