= Tehuana =

Tehuana may refer to:

- Tehuana (people), a term for Zapotec women from the Mexican region of Tehuantepec
  - Tehuana (clothing), the traditional dress of Tehuana women
- Tehuana (crab), a genus of crustaceans in the family Pseudothelphusidae
- Tehuana (plant), a genus of plants in the family Asteraceae
- La Tehuana, oil painting by Saturnino Herrán (1887–1918), also known as Mujer en Tehuantepec
