= Royal Academy Exhibition of 1935 =

1935 art exhibition in London

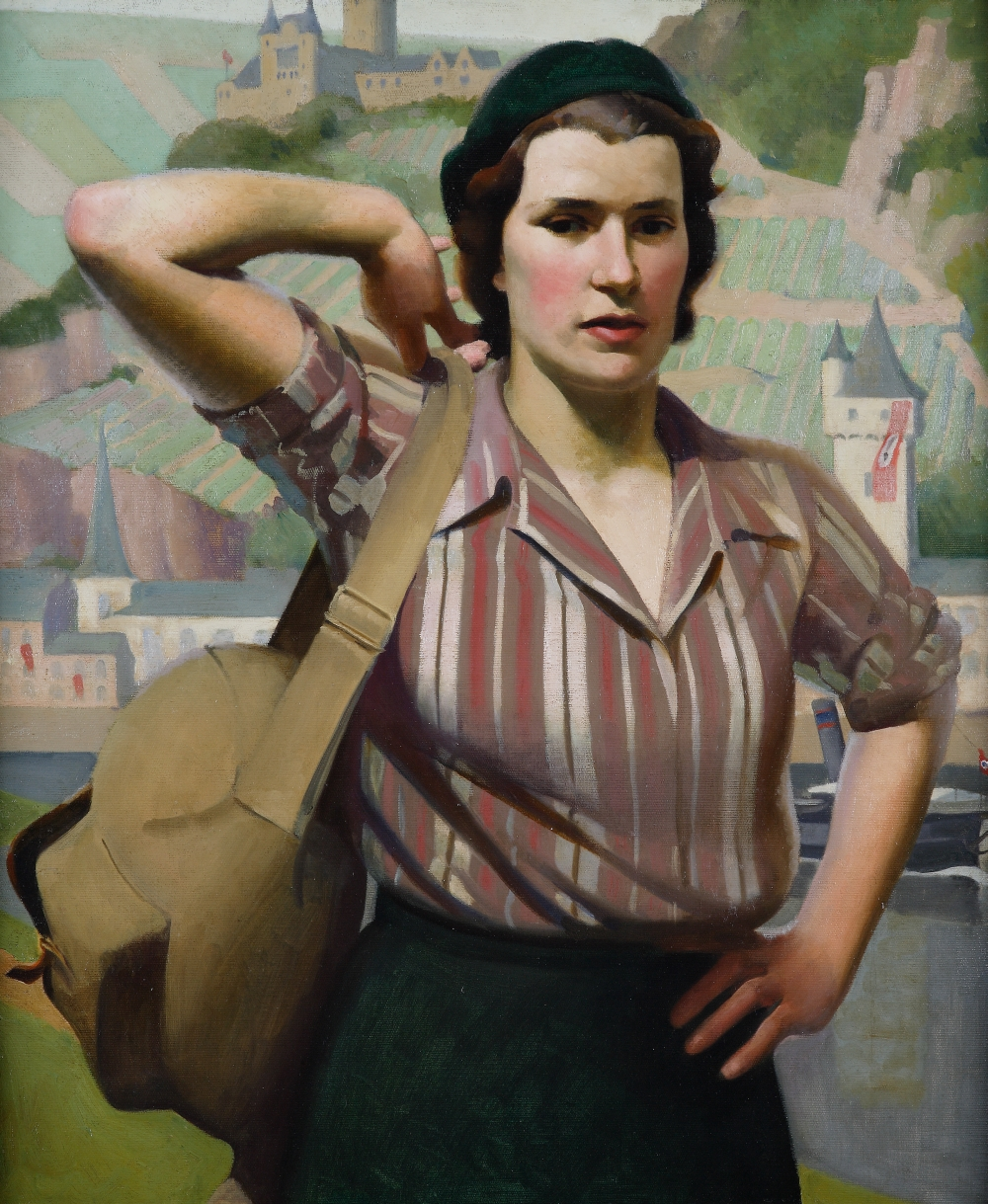
On the Rhine by Percy Shakespeare

The Royal Academy Exhibition of 1935 was the hundred and sixty seventh annual Summer Exhibition of the British Royal Academy of Arts which was held at Burlington House in London's Piccadilly from 6 May to 10 August 1935. A number of works on display commemorated the reign of George V who celebrated his Silver Jubilee on the throne that year.

A notable row broke out over the submissions of Stanley Spencer who had become an Associate Member of the Royal Academy in 1932, sent in five paintings only for the Hanging Committee to reject two of them. In protest Spencer withdrew all his works from the exhibition and resigned his membership. Another member of the Royal Academy Walter Sickert also resigned over a separate matter, although he had been sympathetic to Spencer. However, public opinion was generally against Spencer.

Algernon Newton displayed his cityscape The Surrey Canal, Camberwell. Alfred Munnings submitted six paintings including My Wife, My Horse and Myself, featuring a self-portrait of the artist at his home Castle House in Deadham. Percy Shakespeare's On the Rhine depicted a scene in Nazi Germany. In portraiture Gerald Kelly showed a picture of the writer William Somerset Maugham, while Walter Sickert's portrait of the Anglo-Irish aristocrat and journalist Viscount Castlerosse was accepted but his depiction of his employer Lord Beaverbrook was rejected due to its colossal scale. Lucien Pissarro showed his 1921 picture Apple Blossom, Riversbridge Farm.

== Bibliography ==
- Baron, Wendy. Sickert: Paintings and Drawings. Yale University Press, 2006.
- Goodman, Jean. AJ: The Life of Alfred Munnings. Erskine Press, 2019.
- Spalding, Frances. The Real and the Romantic: English Art Between Two World Wars Thames and Hudson, 2022.
