= 1935 in the Soviet Union =

- Decades: 1920s; 1930s; 1940s; 1950s
- See also: History of the Soviet Union; List of years in the Soviet Union

The following lists events that happened during 1935 in the Union of Soviet Socialist Republics.

In May 1935, the Soviets signed a treaty of mutual assistance with France and Czechoslovakia which lasted until the Molotov–Ribbentrop Pact between the Soviet Union and Germany in 1939.

At the Communist International's 7th Congress, held in July–August 1935, the Soviet government encouraged Marxist–Leninists to unite with other leftists as part of a popular front against fascism.

== Incumbents ==
- General Secretary of the Communist Party of the Soviet Union – Joseph Stalin
- Chairman of the Central Executive Committee of the Congress of Soviets – Mikhail Kalinin
- Chairman of the Council of People's Commissars of the Soviet Union – Vyacheslav Molotov

== Events ==
=== January ===
- 8 January – Battle of Khalkhyn Temple.

=== March ===
- 27 March – The Franco-Soviet Treaty of Mutual Assistance is ratified by the USSR.

=== April ===
- 24 April – William Christian Bullitt Jr., the United States Ambassador to the Soviet Union, hosts the elaborately prepared Spring Ball of the Full Moon, which is said to have surpassed all other embassy parties in Moscow's history.

=== May ===
- 15 May – Joseph Stalin opens the Moscow Metro to the public.

=== June ===
- 26 June – The balloon USSR-1 ascends to an altitude of 16,000 meters and is forced into descent by a release of hydrogen.

=== July ===
- 24 July – First permanent children's railway is opened in Tbilisi.

=== August ===
- 25 August – The Treaty of Establishment, Commerce and Navigation is signed between Iran and the USSR.

=== December ===
- 28 December – Pravda publishes a letter from Pavel Postyshev, who revives the New Year tree tradition in the USSR.

== Births ==
- 7 January – Valeri Kubasov, cosmonaut (d. 2014)
- 10 January – Ninel Shakhova, television journalist (d. 2005)
- 14 January – Yuri Zhuravlyov, mathematician
- 1 February – Vladimir Aksyonov, cosmonaut
- 24 March – Leonid Shebarshin, KGB officer (d. 2012)
- 29 April – Andrey Zaliznyak, linguist (d. 2017)
- 26 May
  - Gary Berkovich, architect
  - Allan Chumak, faith healer (d. 2017)
- 4 July – Leonid Potapov, politician (d. 2020)
- 8 July – Vitaly Sevastyanov, cosmonaut
- 19 July – Vasily Livanov, film actor, screenwriter and animator
- 26 July – Vladimir Nakoryakov, scientist (d. 2018)
- 3 August – Georgy Shonin, cosmonaut
- 2 September – Valentin Gaft, actor (d. 2020)
- 10 November – Igor Dmitriyevich Novikov, astrophysicist
- 23 November – Vladislav Volkov, cosmonaut
- 5 December – Yury Vlasov, weightlifter (d. 2021)

== Deaths ==
- 28 January – Mikhail Ippolitov-Ivanov, composer (born 1859)

== See also ==
- 1935 in fine arts of the Soviet Union
- List of Soviet films of 1935

== Sources ==
- Conquest, Robert (1991). Stalin: Breaker of Nations. Penguin. ISBN 978-0-1401-6953-9.
- Haslam, Jonathan (1979). "The Comintern and the Origins of the Popular Front 1934–1935". The Historical Journal. 22 (3): 673–691. doi:10.1017/s0018246x00017039. S2CID 159573290.
- Khlevniuk, Oleg V. (2015). Stalin: New Biography of a Dictator. Translated by Nora Seligman Favorov. Yale University Press. ISBN 978-0-3001-6388-9.
- Service, Robert (2004). Stalin: A Biography. Macmillan. ISBN 978-0-3337-2627-3.
