= Their Majesties' Return from Ascot =

Painting by Alfred Munnings

- Artist: Alfred Munnings
- Year: 1925
- Type: Oil on canvas, genre painting
- Dimensions: 148 cm × 244.5 cm (58 in × 96.3 in)
- Location: Tate Britain, London

Their Majesties' Return from Ascot is a 1925 oil painting by the British artist Alfred Munnings. It depicts George V and Mary of Teck and their sons, the future Edward VIII and George V returning to Windsor Castle after a day at Royal Ascot. The painting was initially displayed at the Royal Academy Exhibition of 1926 held at Burlington House and at the Venice Biennale in 1928. In 1937 it was acquired for nation to hang in the Tate Gallery through the Chantrey Bequest and was again displayed at the Royal Academy Exhibition of 1938.

== Bibliography ==
- Baillio, Joseph. Alfred J. Munnings: Images of the Turf and Field. Wildenstein and Company, 1983.
- Berry, Claude. The Racehorse in Twentieth Century Art. Sportsman's Press, 1989.
- Goodman, Jean. AJ: The Life of Alfred Munnings. Erskine Press, 2019.
- Taylor, Brandon. Art for the Nation: Exhibitions and the London Public, 1747-2001. Manchester University Press, 1999.
