= Building in Berkeley Square =

Painting by Charles Cundall

- Artist: Charles Cundall
- Year: 1938
- Type: Oil on canvas, landscape painting
- Dimensions: 80.6 cm × 64.8 cm (31.7 in × 25.5 in)
- Location: Tate Britain, London

Building in Berkeley Square is a 1938 oil painting by the British artist Charles Cundall. A cityscape, it shows the construction of the new office block Berkeley Square House in the fashionable Mayfair location Berkeley Square. He depicts it by Night in paintings from the direction of Bruton Street. A group of eighteenth century townhouses had been pulled down on the site, although the artificial light and the two large McAlpine cranes give it an atmosphere of Romance.

The painting was displayed at the Royal Academy Exhibition of 1938 at Burlington House in London along with a picture of the scene by daylight from a different angle. The work was acquired for the nation through the terms of the Chantrey Bequest and now forms part of the collection of the Tate Britain in Pimlico.

== Bibliography ==
- Liss, Paul & Llewellyn, Sacha (ed.) Charles Cundall. Liss Llewellyn Fine Art, 2016.
- Spalding, Frances. The Real and the Romantic: English Art Between Two World Wars Thames and Hudson, 2022.
