= The Surrey Canal, Camberwell =

Painting by Algernon Newton

- Artist: Algernon Newton
- Year: 1935
- Type: Oil on canvas, landscape painting
- Dimensions: 71.8 cm × 91.4 cm (28.3 in × 36.0 in)
- Location: Tate Britain, London

The Surrey Canal, Camberwell is a 1935 oil painting by the British artist Algernon Newton. A cityscape, it depicts a stretch of the Grand Surrey Canal as it passes through Camberwell in South London. His precise views of the waterways of the capital led to him being dubbed the "Canaletto of the Canals".

The painting was displayed at the Royal Academy Exhibition of 1935 held at Burlington House in London and again International Exhibition staged at the Carnegie Institute in Pittsburgh the following year. In 1940 during the Second World War it featured in another show hosted by the Royal Academy where it was acquired for the nation as part of the Chantrey Bequest. Today it is part of the collection of the Tate Britain.

== Bibliography ==
- Chilvers, Ian & Glaves-Smith, John. A Dictionary of Modern and Contemporary Art. Oxford University Press, 2009.
- Hughes, Henry Meyric & Van Tuyl, Gijs (ed.) Blast to Freeze: British Art in the 20th Century. Hatje Cantz, 2002.
- Usherwood, Nicholas. Algernon Newton, R.A., 1880-1968. Sheffield City Art Galleries, 1980.
