= Tehuana (clothing) =

Traditional Mexican clothing

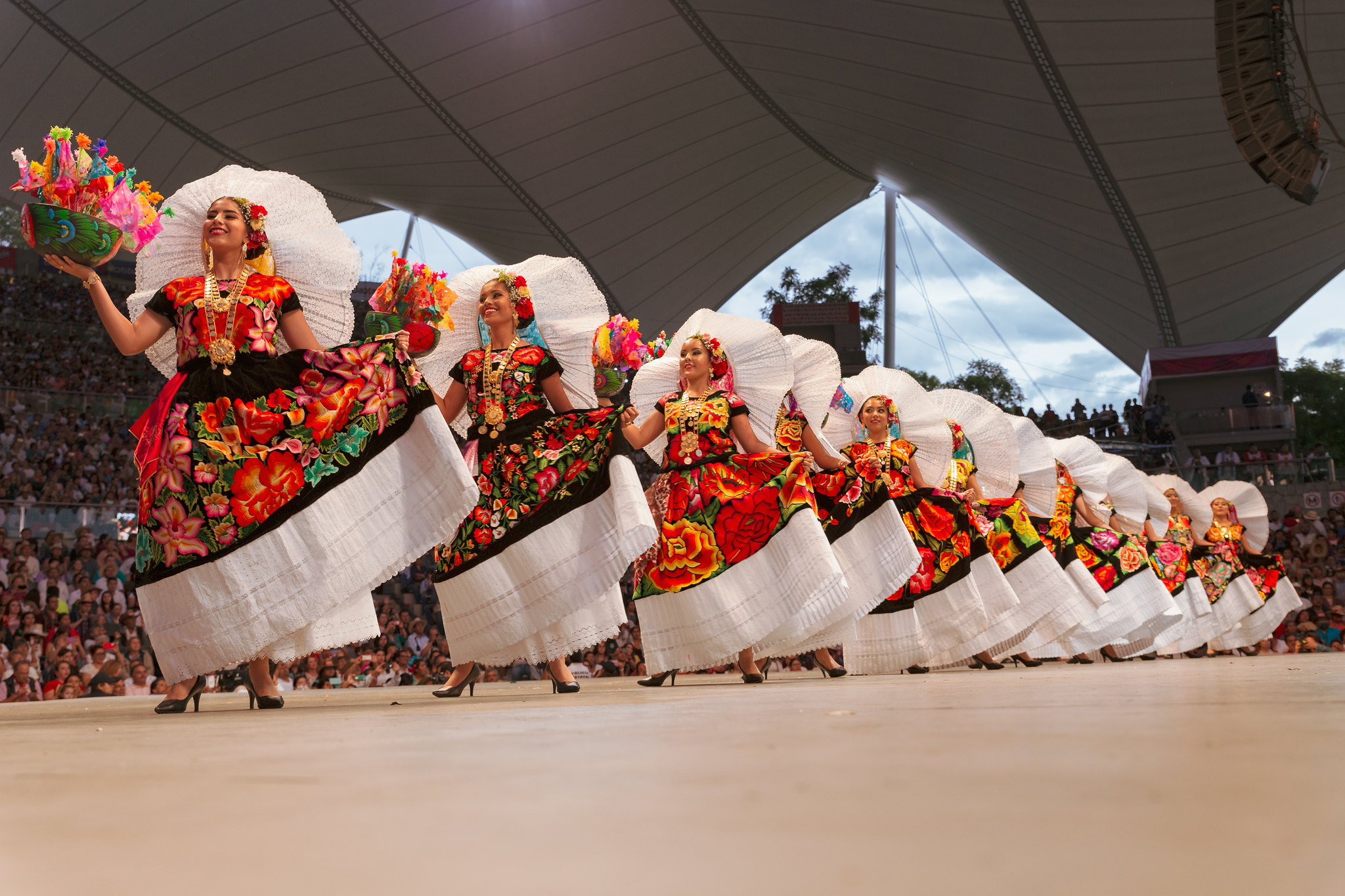
Women dancing while wearing tehuanas

The Tehuana Dress is a style of clothing based on the traditional clothing worn by women in the Isthmus of Tehuantepec in Mexico. The outfit consists of a long skirt and a cotton blouse know as a Huipil. These are usually brightly colored and covered in different motifs. Additionally, a garment known as a Huipil Grande or Resplandor are worn on the head.

== Tehuanas in art ==
The clothing of Tehuanas in Oaxaca is characterized by colorful skirts and embroidered huipiles. The Zapotec women use their dress as a proud reminder of their culture and personal identity. By the 1930's Mexican artist Frida Kahlo had adopted the style and frequently painted self-portraits in the Tehuana dress, which then helped gain popularity outside of Mexico. In her painting titled My Dress Hangs There Kahlo features the huipil and long tiered skirts as the central visual focus, and in the painting Self-Portrait as A Tehuana she wears the Resplandor atop her head surrounding her face as well. Kahlo's personal style featuring the Tehuana dress has come to be the widely recognized image portrayed by the artist.
