= The Coronation of King George VI =

1938 painting by Frank O. Salisbury

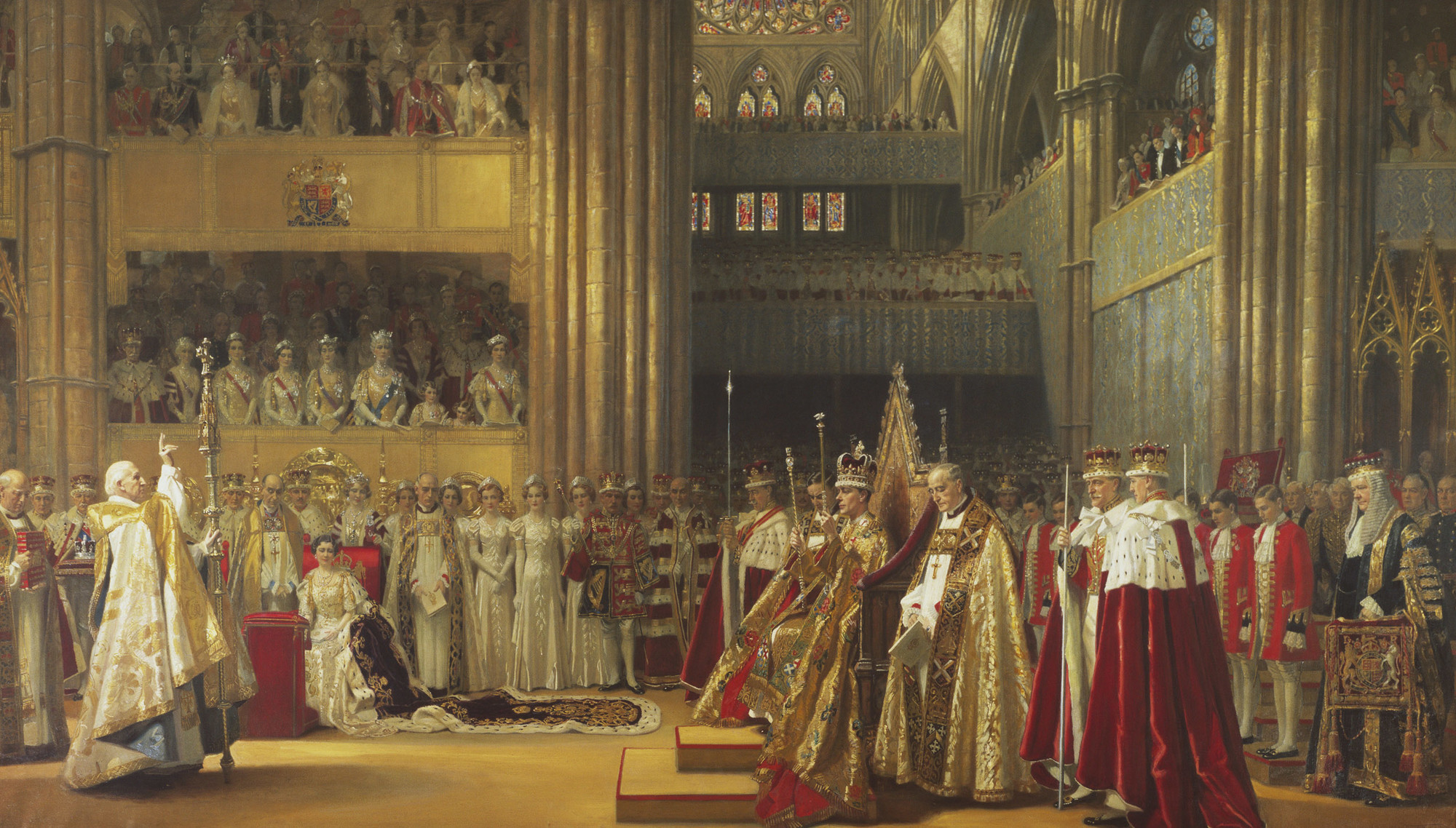
- Artist: Frank O. Salisbury
- Year: 1938
- Type: Oil on canvas, historical painting
- Dimensions: 260.5 cm × 459.9 cm (102.6 in × 181.1 in)
- Location: Royal Collection, London

The Coronation of King George VI is a painting from 1938 by the English artist Frank O. Salisbury. It depicts in oils the coronation of George VI at Westminster Abbey on 12 May 1937. George was forty when he succeeded his brother King Edward VIII to the throne on 11 December 1936 and went on to reign until 1952.

Salisbury's previous commissions included capturing the thanksgiving service at St Paul's Cathedral in honour of the Silver Jubilee of George V. For this portrait, he was allowed to use a space close to the coronation theatre. George VI is depicted seated on the Coronation Chair holding the Sceptre with the Cross and the Sceptre with the Dove. To his right is his wife Queen Elizabeth, behind whom in the gallery stand (from right to left) the Princess Royal, Princess Margaret, Princess Elizabeth (future Elizabeth II), Queen Mary, the Queen of Norway, the Duchess of Gloucester, the Duchess of Kent, the Countess of Strathmore and Kinghorne, and the Earl of Strathmore and Kinghorne in the congregation. The Archbishop of Canterbury is depicted in front of him at the far left of the painting. Both the King and Queen took part in further sittings from late 1937 to early 1938. The finished painting was presented to the couple by the realms of Canada, Australia, New Zealand and the Union of South Africa. The picture was displayed at the Royal Academy Exhibition of 1938 at Burlington House. It has been on a long term loan to the Palace of Westminster.
