= Outskirts of Cheltenham =

Painting by Algernon Newton

- Artist: Algernon Newton
- Year: 1932
- Type: Oil on canvas, landscape painting
- Dimensions: 55.8 cm × 81.3 cm (22.0 in × 32.0 in)
- Location: Private collection

Outskirts of Cheltenham is a 1932 oil painting by the British artist Algernon Newton. It depicts a street on the outskirts of the spa town of Cheltenham in Gloucestershire. Newton was noted for his naturalistic style and urban views, often featuring waterways, which led to the ironic nickname the "Canaletto of the Canals". He was also the father of the actor Robert Newton. By the 1930s his career was enjoying increasing success. While he often based his works on specific sketches and memory, he also created more generalised scenes that didn't depict a specific location which may be the case for this painting.

The picture was first exhibited at the Leicester Galleries in London in 1933. The following year it was included as part of the British display at the Venice Biennale. He subsequently submitted it to the Royal Academy Exhibition of 1938 held at Burlington House in Piccadilly. It was auctioned at Bonhams in 2013.

== Bibliography ==
- Chilvers, Ian & Glaves-Smith, John. A Dictionary of Modern and Contemporary Art. Oxford University Press, 2009.
- Spalding, Frances. The Real and the Romantic: English Art Between Two World Wars Thames and Hudson, 2022.
- Usherwood, Nicholas. Algernon Newton, R.A., 1880-1968. Sheffield City Art Galleries, 1980.
