= Composition with Yellow Lines =

1933 painting by Piet Mondrian

Composition with yellow lines
- Lozenge composition with yellow lines
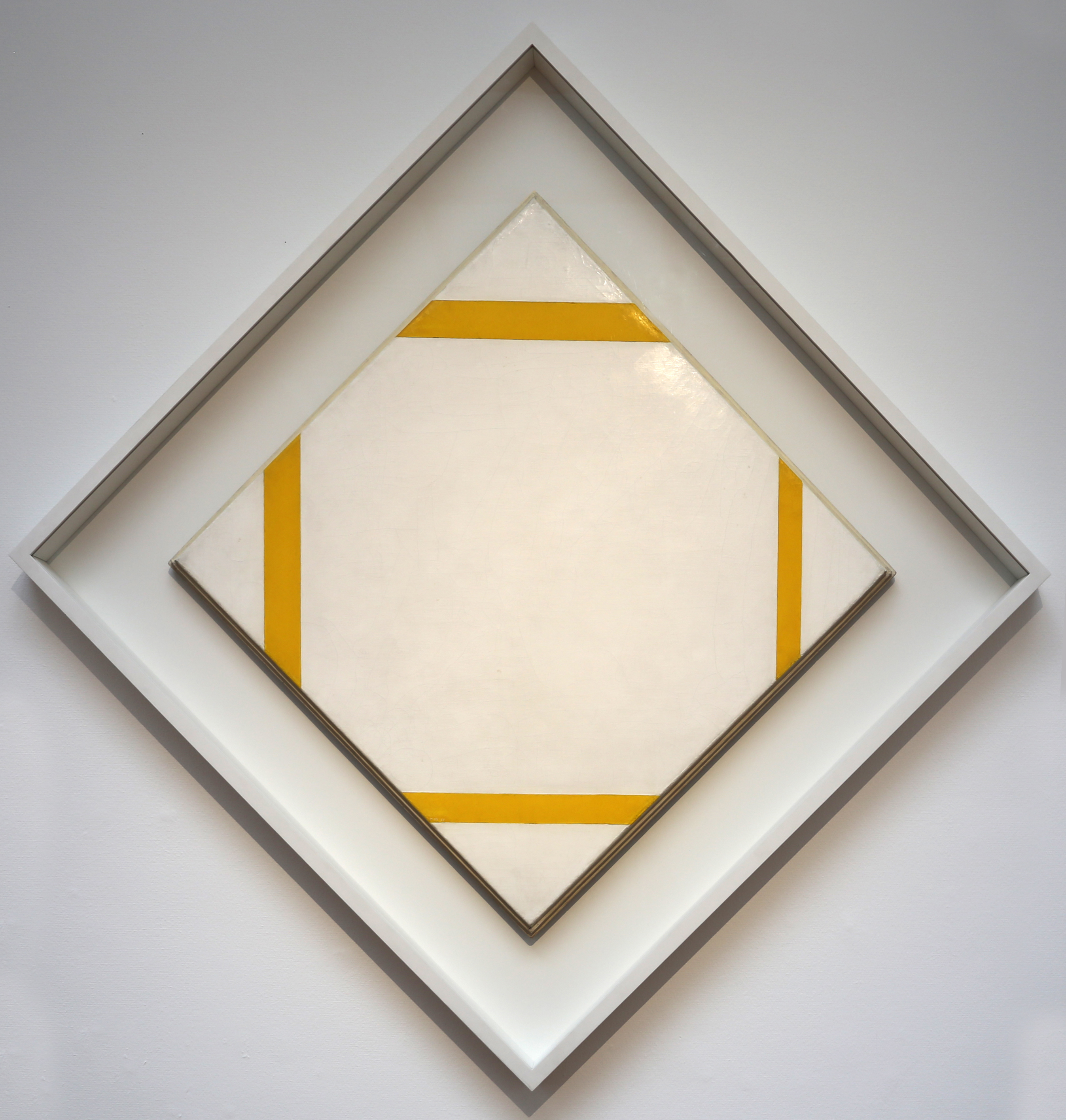
- Artist: Piet Mondrian
- Year: 1933
- Medium: oil paint, canvas
- Dimensions: 80.2 cm (31.6 in) × 79.9 cm (31.5 in)
- Location: Kunstmuseum Den Haag
- Accession: 0332044

Composition with Yellow Lines is an oil on canvas abstract painting on canvas by Dutch artist Piet Mondrian, from 1933. Composition with Yellow Lines hangs in the Kunstmuseum in The Hague.

== History and description ==
While following the grid like structures of his other abstract paintings, it is unusual in omitting the use of any black lines. Indeed, Mondrian's earlier writings on art had stated that any lines in his paintings had to be black; colour was reserved for the filled in rectangles. The painting is equally unusual in that none of the lines meet. He did not paint any further paintings with this design element until his move to New York in 1940.

The painting sometimes receives the title Lozenge Composition with Yellow Lines because of the diamond, or lozenge, shape that the painting has.

The painting was presented to the Kunstmuseum Den Haag in 1933 after a group of artists organised a public collection of funds to purchase it.

== Cultural references ==
A 2007 musical piece for clarinet and piano by the composer Stuart Greenbaum is based on the painting and has the same name.
