= Castle House, Dedham =

House in Dedham, Essex, England

Coordinates: 51.9500°N 0.9961°E

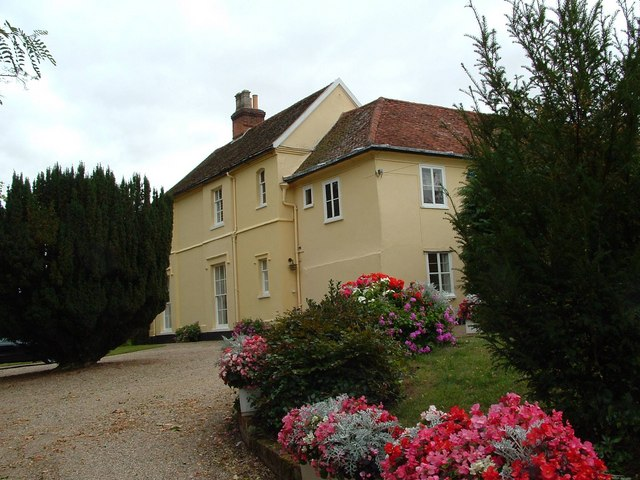
Castle House, Sir Alfred Munnings Museum, in 2009

Castle House in Dedham, Essex, England, was the home of Sir Alfred Munnings from 1919 till his death in 1959. Architecturally the building contains a mixture of Tudor and Georgian elements.

Shortly after his death his widow established The Violet Munnings Trust Fund in 1962 to establish and run an Art Museum in Castle House, in accordance with Munnings' wish that his pictures and estate be left to the nation. In 1965 Castle House Trust was formed whereby the house itself, surrounding land, all of Munnings' paintings still in the possession of Lady Munnings, and further amounts of money and investments were made over to the Trust to form the basis of a museum of his works.

== Sir Alfred Munnings Art Museum ==
The Museum now housed at Castle House is currently open to the public 2pm-5pm Wednesday to Sunday (+ Bank Holiday Mondays) from 1 April until 31 October.

The original bequest to the trust formed the basis of the largest collection of Sir Alfred's works to be found worldwide. The Museum is personalised through the retention of the Munnings' original furniture and artefacts in his old home, it also contains examples from his full life span as an artist. The trust has purchased further paintings by Munnings since the original bequest. The display in the Museum varies over time as paintings are both loaned to the trust and lent to other exhibitions.

The studios where some of Munnings' most famous works were painted are preserved and open to the public.

In 2018 it housed an exhibition of Sir Alfred Munnings' paintings from the Canadian War Museum for the first time.

== See also ==
- Sir Alfred Munnings
- My Wife, My Horse and Myself, a 1935 painting by Munnings featuring the house
