= Charles Cundall =

English painter (1890-1971)

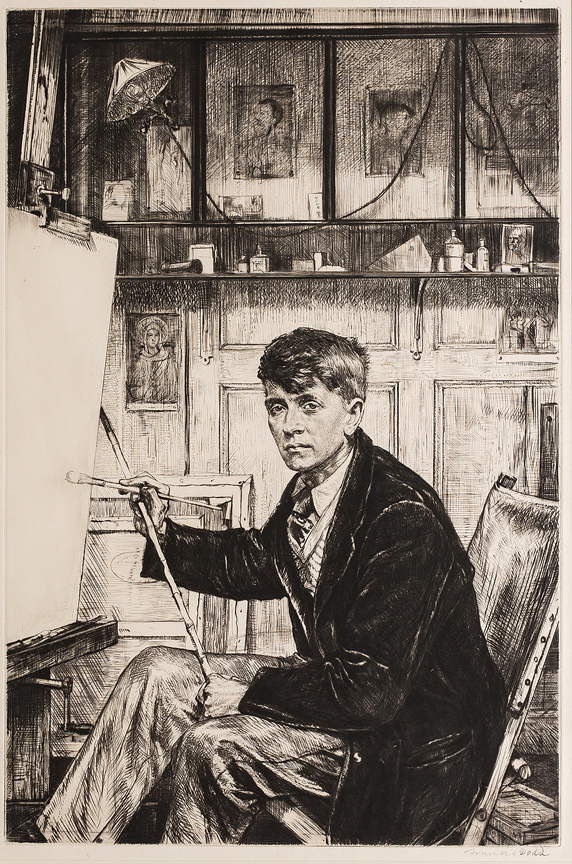
- Cundall in 1926, drawn by Francis Dodd
- Born: 6 September 1890; Stretford, Lancashire, England
- Died: 4 November 1971 (aged 81)
- Education: Manchester School of Art; Royal College of Art
- Known for: Painting, drawing

Charles Ernest Cundall, RA RWS RP, (6 September 1890 – 4 November 1971), was an English painter of topographical subjects and townscapes, best known for his large panoramic canvases.

== Early life ==
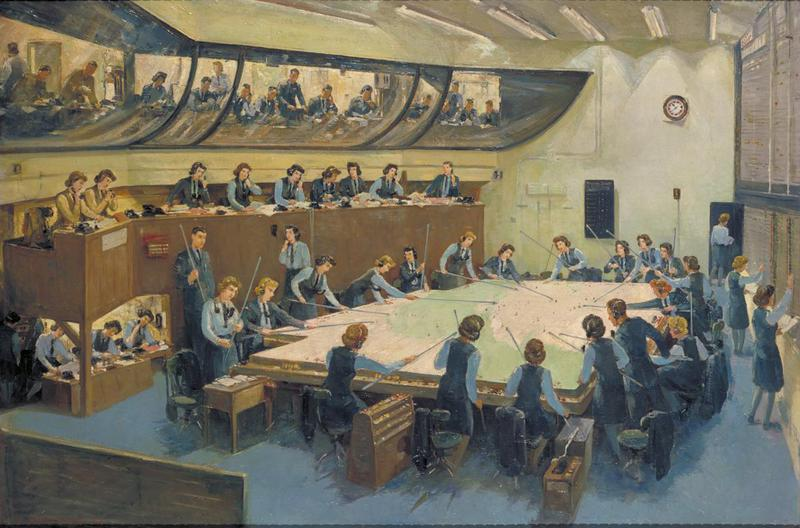
No 11 Fighter Group's Operations Room, Uxbridge (1943) (Art.IWM ART LD 4140)

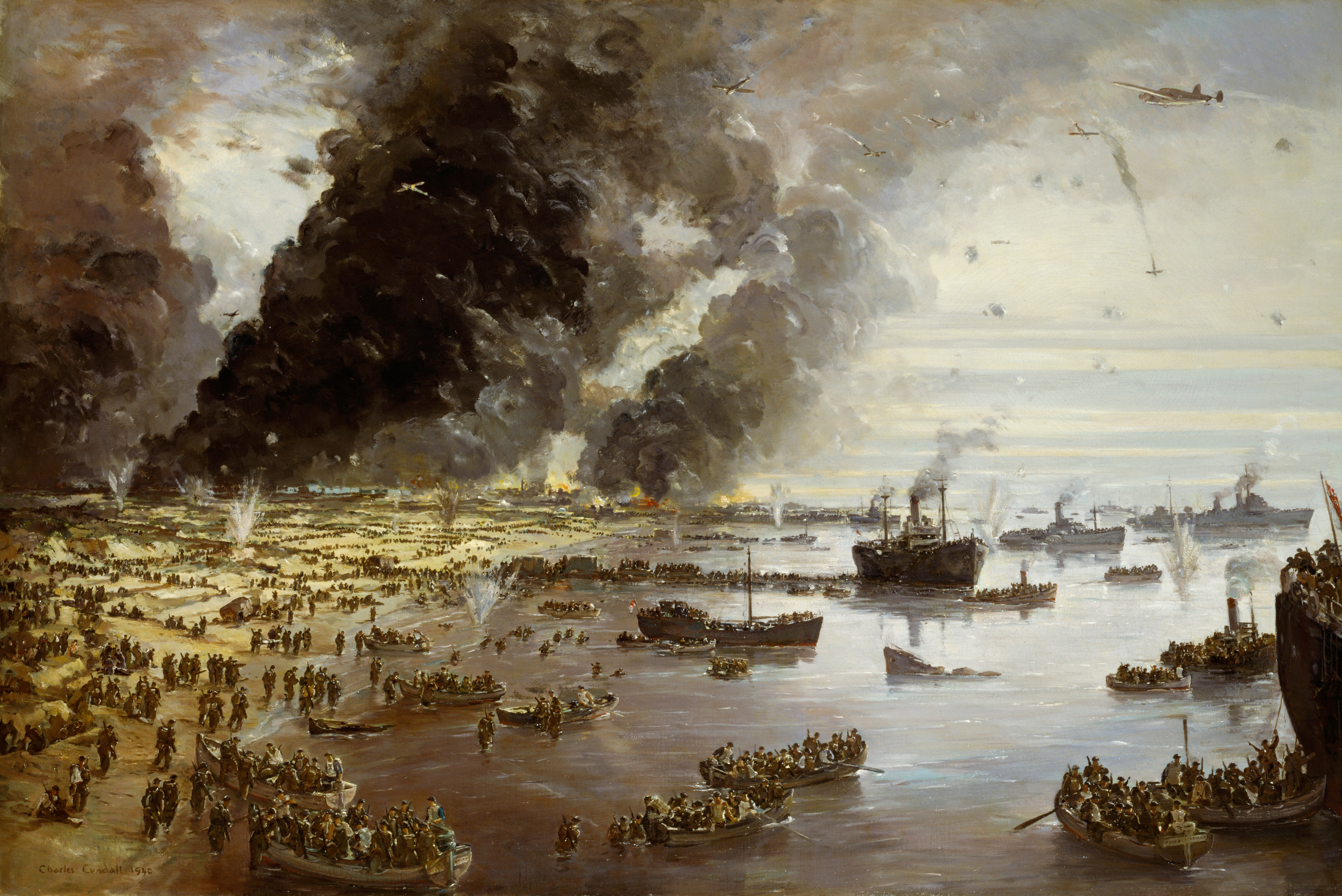
The Withdrawal from Dunkirk, June 1940 (1940) (Art.IWM ART LD 305)

Our Mechanised Army – Tanks in action (Art.IWM ART LD 15)

Cundall was born in Stretford, Lancashire. After working as a designer of pottery and stained glass for Pilkington's Lancastrian Pottery & Tiles under Gordon Forsyth, Cundall studied at the Manchester School of Art and obtained a scholarship to the Royal College of Art in 1912. Whilst serving with the Royal Fusiliers in World War I, he was wounded in the right arm and had to learn to paint with his left arm before he returned to the RCA in 1918. From 1919 to 1920 he attended the Slade School of Art, and then continued his studies in Paris. Cundall traveled widely throughout Italy in 1921 and 1923 and also journeyed to Sweden, Russia and Spain. He held his first solo show at Colnaghi's in 1927 and became known for his panoramic pictures, such as 1933's Bank Holiday, Brighton, which is now in the Tate collection. The Tate also acquired Building in Berkeley Square when it was displayed at the Royal Academy Exhibition of 1938. His work was part of the art competitions at the 1928 Summer Olympics, the 1932 Summer Olympics, and the 1948 Summer Olympics.

== World War II ==
At the start of World War II, Cundall worked on short-term contracts for the War Artists' Advisory Committee before being given a full-time salaried commission as an Admiralty artist to work on Merchant Navy subjects. Cundall spent time on the Thames, the Medway and in the West Country working on this commission before, in 1941 he was assigned to the Air Ministry. He completed his Admiralty canvases whilst starting work on Bomber Command and Coastal Command subjects. He spent the first half of 1942 in Northern Ireland painting the American troops arriving there and worked in Scotland in September and October of that year. Cundall painted RAF subjects throughout Britain, worked on a major painting of the commemoration ceremony of the Battle of Britain for several months in 1943 and visited Quebic in 1944. At the end of the war, King George VI purchased two of Cundall's paintings showing war-time activities in Windsor Great Park.

Among the short-term contracts Cundall completed for the WAAC was his best known work The Withdrawal from Dunkirk, June 1940. Although three WAAC artists, Edward Bawden, Barnett Freedman and Edward Ardizzone, had been part of the British Expeditionary Force's retreat from France in 1940, the works they produced were small-scale representations of events in their immediate surroundings. WAAC therefore, quickly, commissioned two artists, Cundall and Richard Eurich to produce large panoramic reconstructions of the evacuation. As neither artist had witnessed the events at Dunkirk, they relied on published accounts, photographs, eyewitness reports and their own imaginations, to make their compositions. The two finished paintings were shown side by side at the National Gallery in August 1940. The two treatments were very different, and both had their critics and supporters. Most newspaper art critics, and Kenneth Clark, preferred Eurichs' symmetrical, more classical composition and criticised Cundall for having put too much unresolved detail into his picture, which seemed confused and unruly in places. The Royal Navy reproduced Eurich's painting on its official 1940 Christmas card, but many newspapers also reproduced a Ministry of Information photograph showing two servicemen at the National Gallery seemingly recognising elements of Cundall's composition. This helped create a reputation of authenticity for Cundall's work which has persisted.

== Legacy ==
Cundall was a member of the New English Art Club, Royal Watercolour Society, Royal Society of Portrait Painters and other bodies. He was a regular exhibitor at the Royal Academy from 1918 onwards and was elected an associate member in 1937 and a full member in 1944. He was married to the artist Jacqueline Pietersen (1899–1984).

As well as the Tate, works by Cundall are held in the Imperial War Museum, the RAF Museum, Southampton City Art Gallery and several other regional collections in Britain, including in Liverpool, Manchester and Bristol.
