= Ninel Shakhova =

Russian broadcast journalist (1935–2005)

- Нинель Шахова
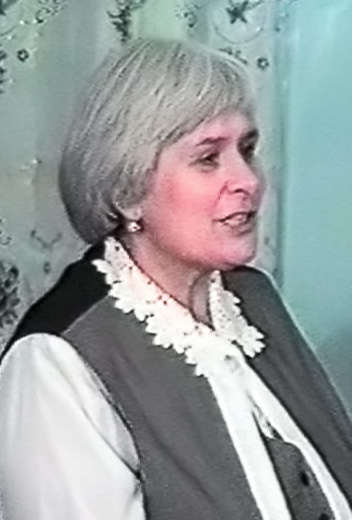
- Born: Ninel Vladimirovna Shakhova; 10 January 1935; Luhansk, Ukrainian SSR
- Died: 8 March 2005 (aged 70); Moscow, Russia
- Education: Philological Faculty of Moscow State University
- Occupation: Journalist
- Years active: 1957–2005
- Awards: Order of the Badge of Honour; Honoured Cultural Worker of the RSFSR

Ninel Vladimirovna Shakhova (Russian: Нинель Владимировна Шахова; 10 January 1935 – 8 March 2005) was a Russian television journalist. She was a correspondent at the Rodina radio station that broadcast to Soviets living abroad and was then a cultural commentator on the Vremya news bulletin between 1971 and 1992. Shakhova was a recipient of both the Order of the Badge of Honour and the Honoured Cultural Worker of the RSFSR.

== Early life ==
Shakhova was born in Luhansk on 10 January 1935. Her father, Vladimir Grekov, served as a colonel general in the Battle of Stalingrad. Shakhova was a 1957 graduate of the Philological Faculty of Moscow State University.

== Career ==
Following her graduation, she began working as a correspondent at the Rodina radio station that broadcast to Soviets living abroad. Shakhova moved into television in 1971. She was a cultural commentator on the Vremya news bulletin on the USSR Central Television and later for the Ostankino Television company. Shakhova did televisual essays in which she interviewed subjects such as Mikhail Sholokhov, Galina Ulanova, Elena Gogoleva, Sergei Lemeshev, Dmitri Shostakovich and Aram Khachaturian among others. When commercial television was introduced in Russia, she left Vremya in 1992 but she continued to consult television stations and her journalistic career.

Shakhova became an employee of the Cinema and Television Center studio in 1992, producing the programmes Russian Province and My Russia, which was about the culture of Russian people and of Russian cities. In the final ten years of her life, she was an expert to the Federation Council on film and television. Shakhova was chairwoman of the jury for the First Bratina Television Festival, the organising committee for the Moscow Orthodox Festival Radonezh, and was a jury member for the Voices of History theatre festival. In 2004, she wrote and published the book, People of My Vremya, discussing her work in television and the subjects she encountered. Shakhova's final work was the 2005 documentary Kaluga Necklace. Her memoirs, After Vremya, were published posthumously in 2010.

== Personal life ==
She died suddenly on the evening of 8 March 2005 while travelling by car to interview the actor Kirill Lavrov in Moscow. A memorial service for Shakhova was held on 11 March at the Russian Cultural Foundation in Moscow. She was buried at Troyekurovskoye Cemetery in Moscow.

== Awards ==
Shakhova was a recipient of the Order of the Badge of Honour and the Honoured Cultural Worker of the RSFSR. She was awarded the Order of the Holy Princess Olga by the Russian Orthodox Church "for the Moral Education of Russians" in 2001. Shakhova won the Russian Union of Journalists award twice.
