= Renato Bertelli =

Italian artist (1900–1974)

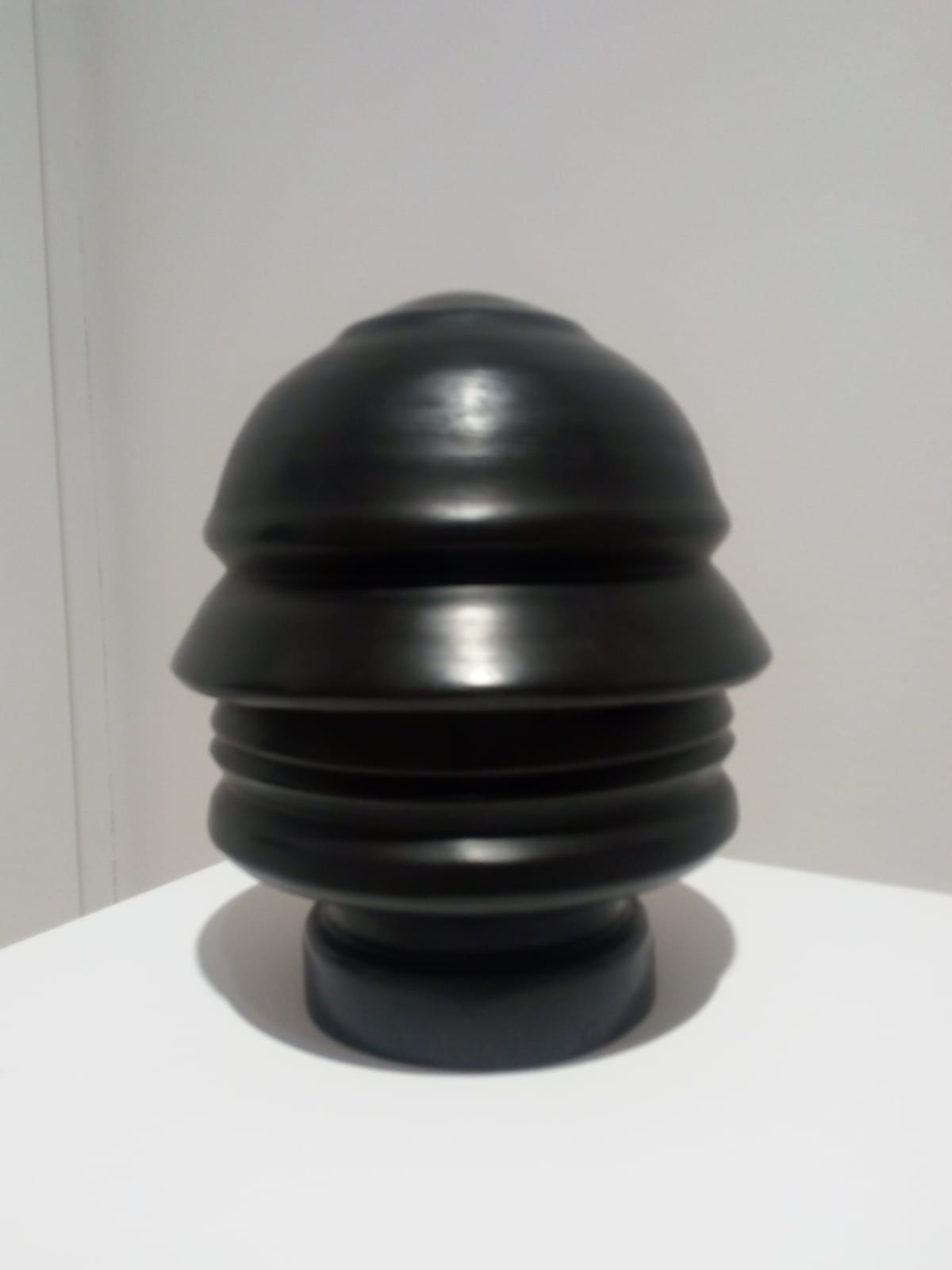
Profilo continuo del Duce

Renato Bertelli (1900 in Lastra a Signa – 1974 in Florence) was an Italian Futurist artist.

His most, and perhaps only, noted work is the 1933 ceramic bust of Benito Mussolini in the aeroceramica style, Profilo continuo del Duce (also cited as Profilo contino del Duce). The title is sometimes given as "Head of Mussolini" but is better known as "Head of Mussolini (Continuous Profile)", "Continuous profile of Mussolini", or "Continuous Profile – Head of Mussolini".

The sculpture is the front half of a silhouette of Mussolini's distinctive profile rotated on a vertical axis through 360 degrees—a reference to Mussolini looking in all directions at once.

The sculpture was later mass produced in several versions, in bronzed terracotta, wood, and aluminium. Mussolini, with his taste for self-commemoration, approved it as an official portrait.
