= 1935 in fine arts of the Soviet Union =

Taras Shevchenko
- Artist: Matvey Manizer
- Year: 1935
- Location: Charkov

The year 1935 was marked by many events that left an imprint on the history of Soviet and Russian Fine Arts.

== Events ==
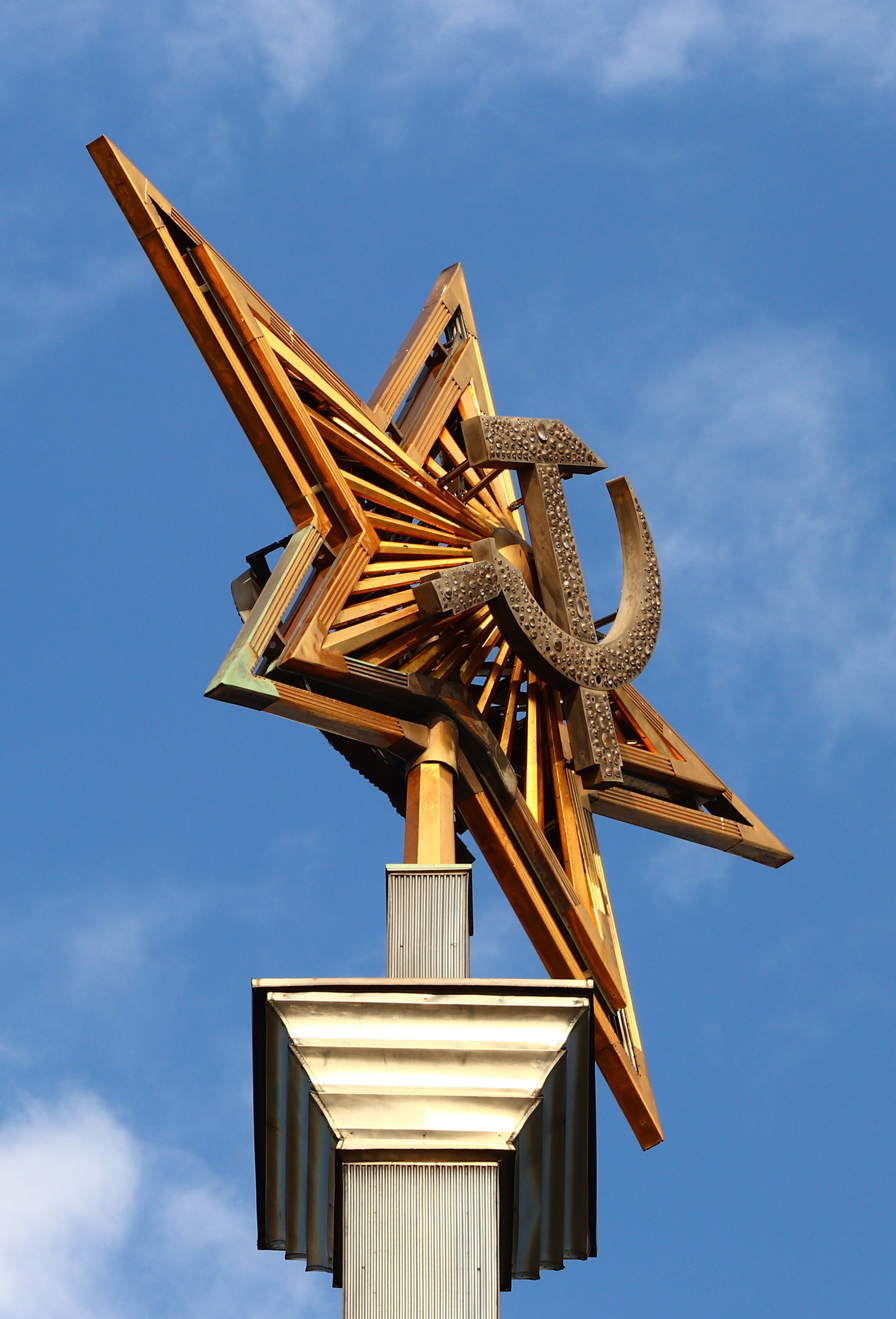
The Kremlin star

- March 24 — A Monument to Taras Shevchenko was opened in Kharkiv. Author of the monument sculptor Matvey Manizer.
- April 24 — The First Exhibition of Leningrad artists was opened in the Russian Museum. Exhibited works of 286 authors created mainly after 1932 year, then was founded the Leningrad Union of Artists. The participants were Isaak Brodsky, Piotr Buchkin, Rudolf Frentz, Vladimir Lebedev, Kazimir Malevich, Victoria Belakovskaya, Alexander Lubimov, Victor Oreshnikov, Alexander Samokhvalov, Alexander Savinov, Vladimir Malagis, Arcady Rylov, Yaroslav Nikolaev, Konstantin Rudakov, and other important Leningrad artists.
- September 30 — Exhibition of painting by the Leningrad artists was opened in Moscow. Exhibited works of 91 painters. The participants were Piotr Buchkin, Yefim Cheptsov, Rudolf Frentz, Vladimir Lebedev, Alexander Lubimov, Victor Oreshnikov, Kuzma Petrov-Vodkin, Alexander Samokhvalov, Alexander Savinov, and other important Leningrad artists.
- October 24 — The first five-pointed star was installed on the Spassky Tower of Moscow Kremlin. Prior to October 27 similar stars have been installed at three another towers of the Moscow Kremlin. The first Kremlin stars was made of gold-plated stainless steel and decorated with precious stones. The stars were made based on sketches by Fyodor Fedorovsky, the chief artist of the Bolshoi Theatre. Semi-precious star stood until 1937, when they were replaced with new Ruby stars.

== Births ==
- February 24 — Victor Otiev (Russian: Отиев Виктор Александрович), Russian Soviet painter (died 1999).
- April 16 — Veniamin Borisov (Russian: Борисов Вениамин Иванович), Russian Soviet painter.
- May 27 — Tatiana Gorb (Russian: Горб Татьяна Владимировна), Russian Soviet painter, graphic artist, and art educator.
- December 28 — Alexander Naumov (Russian: Наумов Александр Александрович), Russian Soviet painter (died 2010).

== Deaths ==
- October 22 — Vasily Kuptsov (Russian: Купцов Василий Васильевич), Russian painter (born 1899).
- November 16 — Pavel Vlasov (Russian: Власов Павел Алексеевич), Russian and Soviet painter and art educator (born 1857)

== See also ==
- List of Russian artists
- List of painters of Leningrad Union of Artists
- Saint Petersburg Union of Artists
- Russian culture
- 1935 in the Soviet Union

== Sources ==
- Выставка картин ленинградских художников в Москве. Каталог. М., Всекохудожник, 1935.
- Каталог первой выставки ленинградских художников. Л., ГРМ, 1935.
- Artists of Peoples of the USSR. Biobibliography Dictionary. Vol. 1. Moscow, Iskusstvo, 1970.
- Artists of Peoples of the USSR. Biobibliography Dictionary. Vol. 2. Moscow, Iskusstvo, 1972.
- Directory of Members of Union of Artists of USSR. Volume 1,2. Moscow, Soviet Artist Edition, 1979.
- Directory of Members of the Leningrad branch of the Union of Artists of Russian Federation. Leningrad, Khudozhnik RSFSR, 1980.
- Artists of Peoples of the USSR. Biobibliography Dictionary. Vol. 4 Book 1. Moscow, Iskusstvo, 1983.
- Directory of Members of the Leningrad branch of the Union of Artists of Russian Federation. Leningrad, Khudozhnik RSFSR, 1987.
- Персональные и групповые выставки советских художников. 1917-1947 гг. М., Советский художник, 1989.
- Artists of peoples of the USSR. Biobibliography Dictionary. Vol. 4 Book 2. Saint Petersburg: Academic project humanitarian agency, 1995.
- Link of Times: 1932 - 1997. Artists - Members of Saint Petersburg Union of Artists of Russia. Exhibition catalogue. Saint Petersburg, Manezh Central Exhibition Hall, 1997.
- Matthew C. Bown. Dictionary of 20th Century Russian and Soviet Painters 1900-1980s. London, Izomar, 1998.
- Vern G. Swanson. Soviet Impressionism. - Woodbridge, England: Antique Collectors' Club, 2001.
- Sergei V. Ivanov. Unknown Socialist Realism. The Leningrad School. Saint-Petersburg, NP-Print Edition, 2007. ISBN 5901724216, ISBN 9785901724217.
- Anniversary Directory graduates of Saint Petersburg State Academic Institute of Painting, Sculpture, and Architecture named after Ilya Repin, Russian Academy of Arts. 1915 - 2005. Saint Petersburg, Pervotsvet Publishing House, 2007.
