= Bank Holiday, Brighton =

Painting by Charles Cundall

- Artist: Charles Cundall
- Year: 1933
- Type: Oil on canvas, landscape painting
- Dimensions: 86.4 cm × 111.8 cm (34.0 in × 44.0 in)
- Location: Tate Britain, London

Bank Holiday, Brighton is a 1933 oil painting by the British artist Charles Cundall. It captures a bustling bank holiday in Brighton, painted from close to the bandstand from the Kemp Town end of the promenade.

Wounded in his right hand during the First World War, Cundall learned to paint with his left. He made his name painting panoramic views of interwar life The painting was displayed at the Royal Academy Exhibition of 1933 at Burlington House in London. Acquired at the time through the Chantrey Bequest, it now forms part of the collection of Tate Britain.

== Bibliography ==
- Liss, Paul & Llewellyn, Sacha (ed.) Charles Cundall. Liss Llewellyn Fine Art, 2016.
- Spalding, Frances. The Real and the Romantic: English Art Between Two World Wars Thames and Hudson, 2022.
