= Minotaur Kneeling over Sleeping Girl =

Etching by Pablo Picasso

Minotaur Kneeling over Sleeping Girl is a 1933 etching by Pablo Picasso. It is part of the Vollard Suite of 100 etchings (No. 93, Bloch 201, Baer 369). It is the first example among several works to be realized through the remaining part of the decade where Picasso used the theme of the legendary Minoan creature, the Minotaur.

== Sources ==
- Martin Ries. "Picasso and the Myth of the Minautor". Art Journal, winter, 1972/1973, XXXII/2. Archived from the original on 2019-03-13.

== Books ==
- Françoise Gilot, Carlton Lake (1989). Life with Picasso. Anchor Books, Doubleday. ISBN 0385261861.
