= Sinikka Kurkinen =

Finnish painter (born 1935)

Sinikka Mirjam Kurkinen
- Born: 1935; Joutseno, Finland

Sinikka Mirjam Kurkinen (born 1935) is a Finnish painter. She studied in Helsinki and Paris.

Kurkinen was born in Joutseno, South Karelia. She gave her first exhibitions in Imatra in 1955 and in Helsinki in 1958. Her works can be seen at Ateneum, the Imatra Museum of Art and in various other locations all over the country.

Kurkinen is an honorary member of the Imatra Art Association. She has won many awards during her career, including the Art Prize of Imatra in 1983.
