= My Wife, My Horse and Myself =

Painting by Alfred Munnings

- Artist: Alfred Munnings
- Year: 1935
- Type: Oil on canvas, portrait painting
- Dimensions: 101 cm × 126.4 cm (40 in × 49.8 in)
- Location: Munnings Museum, Dedham

My Wife, My Horse and Myself is a 1935 oil painting by the British artist Alfred Munnings. It feature a self-portrait of Munnings alongside his wife Violet against the backdrop of their cream-coloured home Castle House in Dedham. Munnings originally titled it Our Mutual Friend and it became one of his best-known works.

Munnings was a noted painter of British Impressionism, who later served as President of the Royal Academy. This has been described as a "distillation, in oil on canvas, of all his beliefs about art". as well as a play on the tradition of the eighteenth century conversation piece. The painting was displayed at the Royal Academy Exhibition of 1935 held at Burlington House in London. Today it forms part of the collection of the Munnings Museum at Castle House.

== Bibliography ==
- Goodman, Jean. AJ: The Life of Alfred Munnings. Erskine Press, 2019.
- Graham-Dixon, Andrew. A History of British Art. University of California Press, 1999.
- Maconochie, Tiggy. Blacks and Bays, Dapples and Greys: All the Pretty Horses in Art and Photography. Rizzoli, 2026.
