= The Apotheosis of Athanasios Diakos =

1933 painting by Konstantinos Parthenis

- Αποθέωση του Αθανασίου Διάκου (Greek)
- Artist: Konstantinos Parthenis
- Year: 1933
- Medium: oil on canvas
- Dimensions: 380 cm × 380 cm (150 in × 150 in)
- Location: National Gallery of Greece, Athens

The Apotheosis of Athanasios Diakos (Greek: Αποθέωση του Αθανασίου Διάκου) is an oil painting by Konstantinos Parthenis created in 1933. The oil painting is exhibited at the National Gallery of Greece.

== Theme ==
Athanasios Diakos was a freedom fighter for Greek independence, who was executed in 1821 by the Ottoman Empire by impalement following the Battle of Alamana.

== Analysis ==
The painting shows a secular subject in a religious composition, with a cubist style.

== See also ==
- National Gallery (Athens)

== Sources ==
- Marina Lambrakē-Plaka; Olga Mentzaphou; Ethnikē Pinakothēkē; Mouseion Alexandrou Soutsou; Tonia Giannoudakē; Hidryma Euripidēs Koutlidēs (1999). National Gallery, 100 years: four centuries of Greek painting from the collections of the National Gallery and the Euripidis Koutlidis Foundation. National Gallery and Alexandros Soutzos Museum. ISBN 9789607791030.
