= Vladislav Lalicki =

Production and Costume Designer (1935–2008)

- Vladislav Lalicki
- Born: 1 June 1935; Šabac, Serbia
- Died: 29 December 2008 (age 73); Belgrade, Serbia
- Known for: Production designer, Costume designer

Vladislav Lalicki (1 June 1935 – 29 December 2008), also known as "Wladyslaw Lalitzky", was a Serbian production designer, costume designer, and painter.

Lalicki has worked with Šabac National Theatre since 1958, Atelje 212 Theatre in Belgrade since 1961, Yugoslav Drama Theatre since 1965. He worked with theatres in United States, the former USSR and Poland and with many theatres and theatre groups in the former Yugoslavia. Vladislav Lalicki was production/costume designer for over 500 theatre plays, 200 TV shows and numerous movies. He also provided more than 500 books with illustrations.

Lalicki spent most of his life in Belgrade, but he also spent 18 years (1984–2002) in Johannesburg, South Africa, where he influenced South African art. Many of his paintings are located in the Johannesburg Museum and the Everard Read Art Gallery.

He was married twice and had four children. He died in Belgrade and was buried in Alley of Distinguished Citizens in Novo groblje in the city.

== Member of ==
- ULUPUDS The Applied Artists and Designers Association of Serbia"
- SPID-YU "Federation of Association of Applied Arts Artists and Designers of Yugoslavia"
- ICSID "International Council of Societies of Industrial Design"
- ICOGRADA "International Council of Graphic Design Association"
- WCC "World Crafts Council"
- AIC "Academie Internationale dela Céramique"

== Filmography as production/costume designer ==
- Doktorka na selu (1982) TV Series
- Kante ili kese (1982) (TV)
- Kir Janja (1981) (TV)
- Deset najlepsih dana (1980) (TV)
- Telegram (1980) (TV)
- Tren (1980) (mini) TV Series
- Sumnjivo lice (1979) (TV)
- Cardak ni na nebu ni na zemlji (1978) TV Series
- Maska (1978) (TV)
- Sedam sekretara SKOJ-a (1978) (mini) TV Series
- Marija Magdalena (1977) (TV)
- Poseta stare dame (1976) (TV)
- Prica o vojniku (1976)
- Testament (1975)
- Obesenjak (1974) (TV)
- Kralj Ibi (1973) (TV)
- Proslava (1973) (TV)
- Celava pevacica (1972) (TV)
- Gradjani sela Luga (1972) TV Series
- Nesporazum (1972) (TV)
- Sami bez andjela (1972) (TV)
- Slava i san (1972) (TV)
- Sladak zivot na srpski nacin (1971) (TV)
- Levaci (1970) TV Series
- Evgenija na zrnu graska (1968) (TV)
- Kad golubovi polete (1968)
- Martin Krpan s vrha (1968) (TV)
- Prijateljstvo, zanat najstariji (1968) (TV)
- Sirota Marija (1968)
- Zanati (1968) TV Series
- Eci, pec, pec (1961)
- Pedagoska bajka (1961)

== Awards ==
- Work Life Award "Petar Pasic" (2004)
- BIENNALE DE PARIS (1961)
- Award "Sterija Popovic" for costume design (1981)
- Special Award "Sterija Popovic" for theatre play "Bele rakete lete na Amsterdam" (1973)
- 1st prize for production design of "Tri para hozn tregera" theatre play in Leskovac (1970)
- Golden Laurel Crown in Sarajevo (1968)
- Golden Laurel Crown in Sarajevo (1963)
- November award of city Šabac for theatre play "Fuente Ovehuna, Zlatni pijesak" (1958)
- November award of city Šabac for design "Fuente Ovehuna, Zlatni pijesak" (1958)
- 1st prize on "Susreti Vojvodjanskih Pozorista"
- 1st prize on "ULUPUS Spring Salon" for design
- 1st award on "Oktobarski Salon za Slikarstvo"
- 1st award on "Oktobarski Salon za Slikarstvo"
- 1st award on "Lutkarski Festival Jugoslavije"
