= Alessandro Bruschetti =

Italian painter

- Bruschetti
- Born: 1910; Perugia
- Died: 2 January 1980 (aged 69–70); Brugherio

Alessandro Bruschetti (1910 – 2 January 1980) was an Italian Futurist artist. The second most important Futurist painter from Umbria.

== Life ==
Bruschetti was born in 1910 in Perugia which is where he studied art. He was influenced by a meeting with the futurist artist Gerardo Dottori. He is considered the second most important Futurist painter from Umbria after Dottori.

In 1931 he moved to Rome to train as a teacher. Whilst he was there, one of his paintings, Dynamism of horses, was lauded by Filippo Tommaso Marinetti who was the founder of futurism. With Marinetti's approval he joined the artistic group. In the same year he took part in his first exhibition. In 1933 he was exhibiting in Rome and at a Futurist exhibition in Milan. Be started at the Venice Biennale in 1934 and he returned in 1936, 1938 and then the last, before the end of World War II, in 1942. The Quadrennial Exhibition in Rome took his work in 1935 and 1939. His first solo exhibition was in Rome in 1935. After 1944 and the end of Futurism Bruschetti took to including geometric shapes and light sources in his paintings.

Bruschetti died in Brugherio in 1980. In 2011 a book was published about his work.
