= My Dress Hangs There =

1933 artwork by Frida Kahlo

- Spanish: Allá cuelga mi vestido
- Artist: Frida Kahlo
- Year: 1933
- Medium: Oil and collage on masonite
- Dimensions: 45.7 cm × 49.5 cm (18.0 in × 19.5 in)
- Location: Hoover Gallery, San Francisco, California

My Dress Hangs There (1933) is an oil painting and collage by Mexican artist Frida Kahlo.

Kahlo began this painting while staying in New York City with her husband, Diego Rivera, and completed it after the couple returned to their home in Mexico City. The painting was shown to the public for the first time at the Levy Gallery in New York in 1938 with the title My Dress Was There Hanging, and was shown again in Paris in 1939 with the title Ma robe était pendue là.

The central focus of the painting is Kahlo's red, green, and white Tehuana dress, which is hanging on a blue hanger across a blue ribbon. The background of the painting contains images of items that Kahlo considers to be symbolic of America and capitalism, including skyscrapers, an overflowing trashcan, a statue of George Washington, a toilet, and the Statue of Liberty. Overall, My Dress Hangs There demonstrates Kahlo's criticisms of capitalism and her desire to return to Mexico.

On the back of the painting, Kahlo wrote "Pinté esto en New York cuando Diego estaba pintando el mural en Rockefeller Center (I painted this in New York when Diego was painting the mural at Rockefeller Center)."

== See also ==
- List of paintings by Frida Kahlo
- Frida Kahlo Museum, La Casa Azul
- Man at the Crossroads, Diego Rivera's 1933 Rockefeller Center mural
