= Algernon Newton =

English landscape artist (1880–1968)

Algernon Newton RA
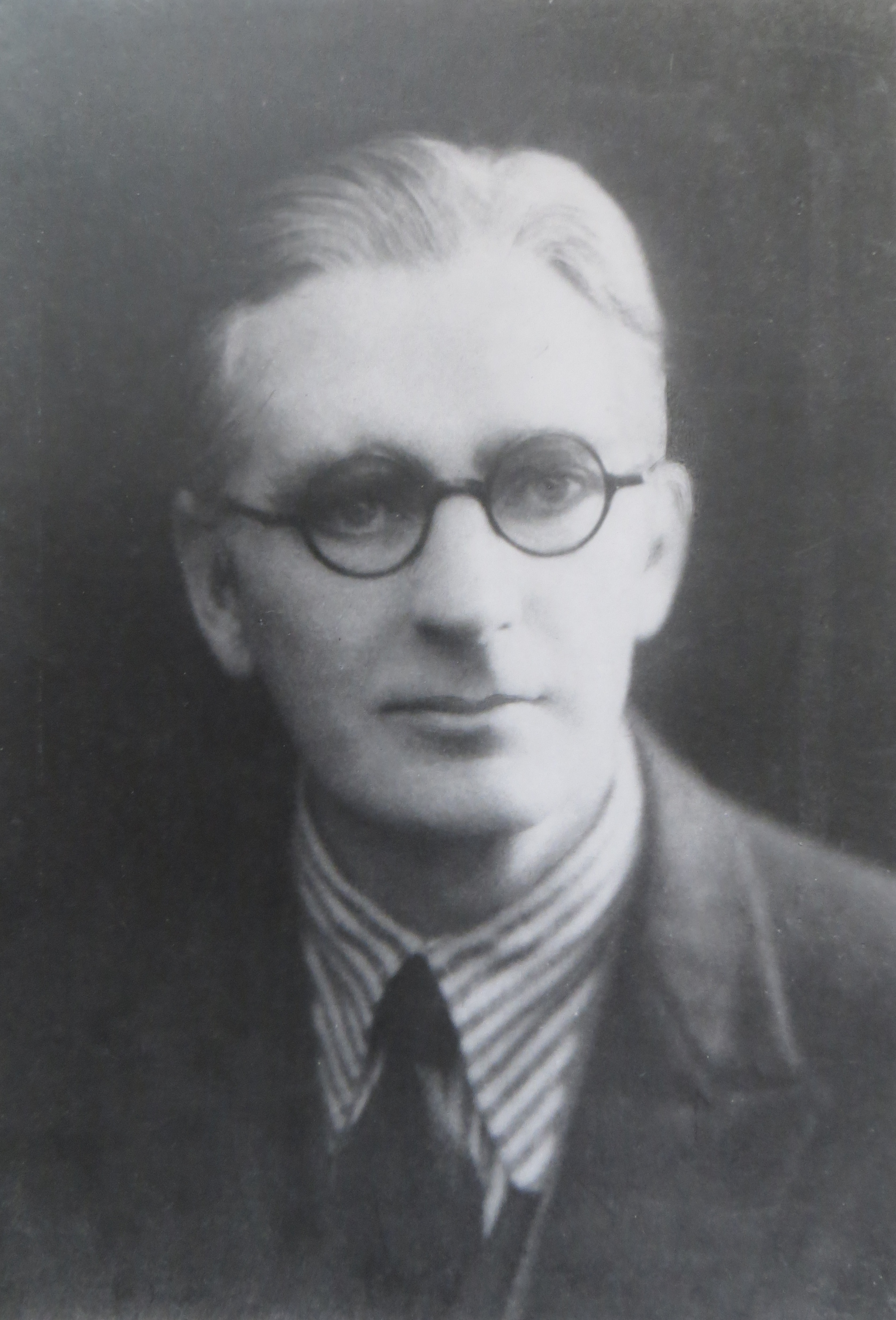
- Born: 23 February 1880; London, England
- Died: 21 May 1968 (aged 88)
- Education: Clare College, Cambridge
- Partner: Marjorie Emilia Balfour
- Children: 4, including Robert
- Elected: Royal Academy of Arts, 1943

Algernon Cecil Newton RA (23 February 1880 – 21 May 1968) was an English landscape artist known as the "Canaletto of the canals".

== Biography ==
Newton was born in Hampstead in 1880, a grandson of Henry Newton, one of the founders of the Winsor & Newton the art materials company.

Early in World War I, Newton held the rank of Sub-lieutenant in the Royal Naval Volunteer Reserve. Later, he served with the Army and was invalided out in 1916 after catching pneumonia, recuperating over the next few years among the artist community at Lamorna, Cornwall.

In 1919 he returned to London and started exhibiting at the Royal Academy of Art. In the 1920s, he also regularly exhibited at the New English Art Club. He was elected ARA (Associate Royal Academician) in 1936, and a full RA in 1943. He displayed his 1932 painting Outskirts of Cheltenham at the Royal Academy in 1938.

His Evening on the Avon was commissioned for the Long Gallery of the RMS Queen Mary. A number of his paintings are in Art Galleries in the United Kingdom, Australia and the United States – notably in the Tate Britain. In 2011 the Metropolitan Museum, New York acquired his painting Stormy Sunset on the East Coast (1939).

His obituary in The Times described him as "a painter of quiet distinction ... He could take the most forbidding canal or group of factory buildings and, without romanticizing or shrinking any detail, create a poetic and restful composition out of it." He himself once wrote: "There is beauty to be found in everything, you only have to search for it; a gasometer can make as beautiful a picture as a palace on the Grand Canal, Venice. It simply depends on the artist's vision."

== International career ==
As well as exhibiting widely in the UK he also showed internationally, including alongside Picasso, Braque and Chagall in the Carnegie International Exhibition of Painting at Pittsburgh in 1938. In 1926 and 1934, he was one of the artists chosen to represent Britain at the Venice Biennale of Art.

== Personal life ==
Newton married Marjorie Emilia Balfour Rider, author of Mr Duveen: An Allegory. They had two sons—one of whom was the actor Robert Newton—and two daughters. Ann Paludan was their granddaughter. His great-grandson is Sir Mark Jones.

== Legacy ==
His auction record is £225,000, set at the sale of contents of Warmington Grange by Duke's Auctions on 12 May 2021 for his oil A Dorset Landscape.

A catalogue raisonné of Newton's work is being prepared by his great-grandson, Sir Mark Jones.

== Selected exhibitions ==
- Paintings Around London by Algernon Newton, Leicester Galleries, London, March 1933
- Watercolours by Frank Dobson. Paintings by Algernon Newton, ARA. Paintings by Vanessa Bell, Leicester Galleries, London, June–July 1941. Newton's work was praised in The Times: "His work is impressive ... Several of the large London scenes are admirable, particularly Spring Morning, Campden Hill, an empty street with the slightest haze in the air, and, at the far end, a pink house which puts in just the right touch of colour to form a focus for the whole".
- Looking at the View, Tate Britain, 2012.
- Algernon Newton, Daniel Katz Gallery, London 2012.

== Works in public galleries ==
- Two of his works are in the Tate collection.
- Six of the works he created for the Recording Britain project are in the V&A.
- In 1959 his painting Port was presented to Rochdale Art Gallery by the Contemporary Art Society.
- The Regent's Canal, Paddington is in the Royal Academy collection.
- Birmingham with the Hall of Memory is in the Birmingham Museum and Art Gallery
- Holland House, Kensington, and three other works, are in the Government Art Collection
- Dutch Garden from the Serpentine is in the Art Gallery of New South Wales.
- River Scene is in Glasgow Museums & Art Galleries

A portrait of him by photographer Walter Stoneman is in the National Portrait Gallery collection.
