= DYN (magazine) =

Art magazine founded by Wolfgang Paalen

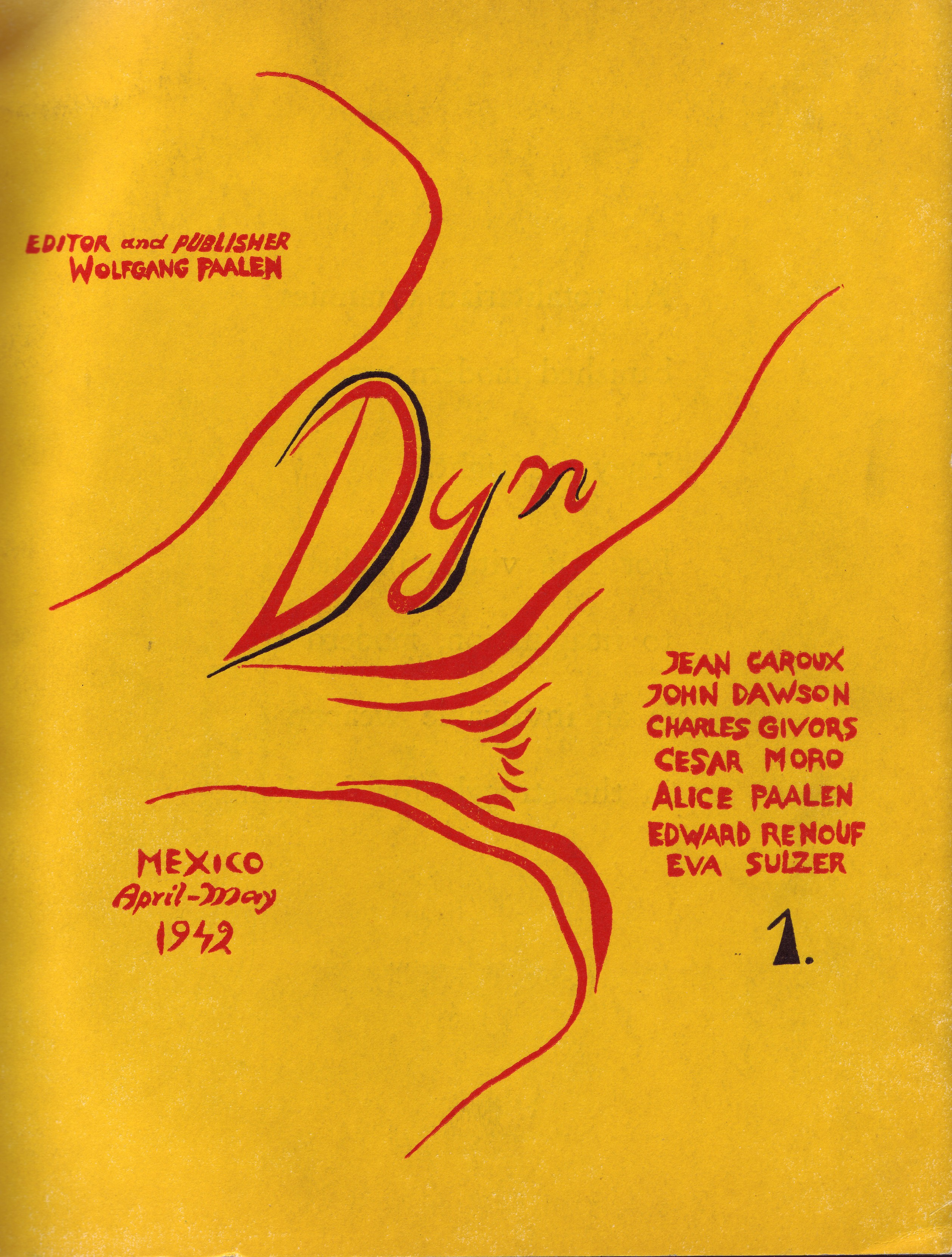
First issue of the magazine, Mexico, 1942

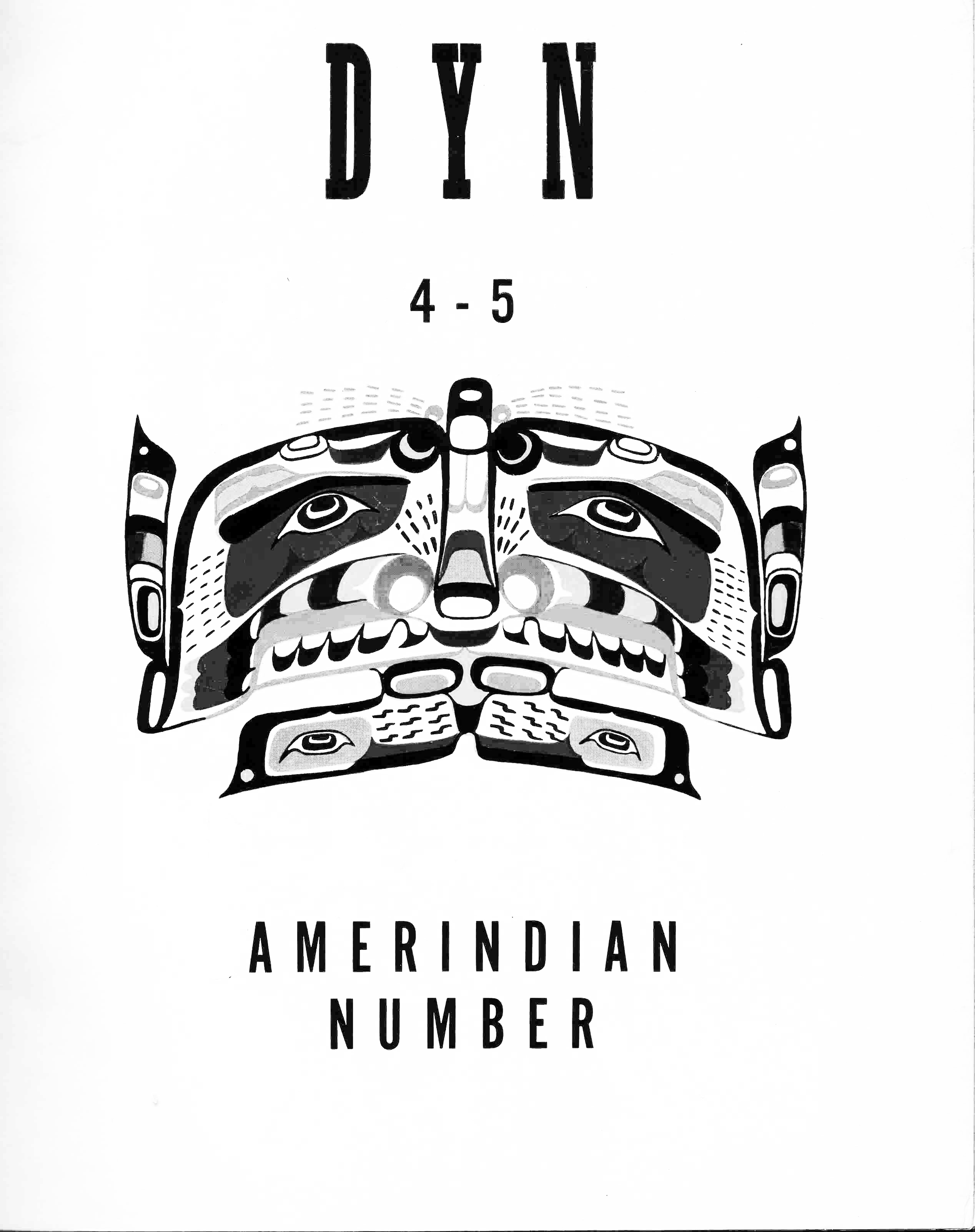
Title page of DYN 4–5 (Amerindian Number), Mexico, 1943

DYN (derived from the Greek word κατὰ τὸ δυνατόν, that which is possible) was an art magazine founded by the Austrian-Mexican Surrealist Wolfgang Paalen, published in Mexico City, and distributed in New York City, and London between 1942 and 1944. Only six issues were produced.

== Background ==
With his journal Paalen in his work as editeur gave himself the opportunity to fully develop his intellectual abilities with the evident but nevertheless for himself surprising result that he temporarily advanced to one of the most influential art theorists during the war. In seven large essays and countless smaller articles and reviews he discussed in detail all current hot topics that also concerned the young artists in New York, and in response received their full attention: the new image as potential picture-being; morality, deliberated of Marxist means-end thinking; plastic automatism—deliberated of the bondage of preconceived literary contents; dialectical materialism—unmasked as rooted in nothing else than a cleverly exploited mental weakness; microphysics—as confirmation of the viewer-dependent, potential nature of all being; the flat and rhythmical canvases of cubism—as true origin of a new spatial adventure overcoming the painting as window; and over all the female Totem as a mantra for a dialogical self-expression. One of the main underlying notions of DYN was the attempt to reconcile diverging materialist and mystical tendencies in Surrealism with a new art-philosophy of contingency. Andre Breton, however, reacted as deeply offended, and in the preface of VVV argued: "We reject the lie of an open Surrealism, in which anything is possible".

== Contributors ==
Paalen dominated its contents as editor and contributed its major topics in seven large essays and numerous smaller reviews and articles. DYN's editorial board later enlisted a number of associated thinkers and artists, including Miguel Covarrubias, César Moro, Henry Miller, Anaïs Nin, Gordon Onslow Ford and Robert Motherwell. Each edition covered various subjects and themes, such as poetry, visual arts, anthropology, science, and philosophy, and was illustrated by a wide range of artists, including Manuel Álvarez Bravo, Alice Rahon, William Baziotes, Motherwell, Roberto Matta, Jackson Pollock, Harry Holtzman, and Henry Moore.

== Numbers ==
In the first number (April-May 1942) Paalen emphasized his will to rediscuss some of the fundamentals in Surrealist theory and publicly announced to his friend Breton his "farewell to Surrealism." Paalen's main intention of this provocation was to tease the dogmatic attitudes implicit in Surrealist theory. The number contained also his groundbreaking essay The New Image, in which he tried to find criteria for true modernism in painting, which should have a "pre-figurative" essence and not stick to contents of the personal memory of the artist.

In the second issue (July-August) he published a survey on dialectical materialism which consisted of a set of three questions sent to two dozen outstanding scholars and writers, and the statements of those who responded. In a provocative and straightforward way Paalen enquires after the academic validity of the philosophy of Karl Marx and Friedrich Engels as a science. Half of the addressees replied, amongst them Albert Einstein, Clement Greenberg, and Bertrand Russell. The majority answered all questions No. Russell answered bluntly: "I think the metaphysics of both Hegel and Marx plain nonsense - Marx's claim to be 'science' is no more justified than Mary Baker Eddy's." The number contained also Paalen´s pleading for a cognitive perception of inspiration (Surprise and Inspiration).

The third number was released already in autumn 1942 with Paalen´s essay "Art and Science" about the Goethe-Newton debate on light, adapted to the dangerous imbalance of scientific and artistic notions in the modern world in view of the atomical danger. It contained also essays and poetical texts by Gustav Regler, Edward Renouf, Henry Miller, Anaïs Nin, Valentine Penrose, César Moro and Alice Paalen.

The fourth and fifth number were released together after Paalen´s long illness as the "Amer-Indian Number" (DYN 4-5) with Paalen´s long expected essay on "Totem Art" about his vision of the ancestor-art of the indigenous populations of British Columbia. It contained also critiques of famous anthropologists and archaeologists like Alfonso Caso ("The Codices of Azoyu"), Miguel Covarrubias ("Tlatilco, Archaic Mexican Art and Culture"", on Olmecs), Maud Worcester Makemson ("The Enigma of Maya Astronomy"), Jorge Enciso ("Seals of the Ancient Mexicans"), Miguel Angel Fernandez ("New Discoveries in the Temple of the Sun in Palenque"), Carlos R. Margain Araujo ("The Painting in Mexican Codices") and Francisco Diaz de Leon ("Gabriel Vicente Gahona"). With his essay "Birth of Fire" Paalen provided the mythological discourse in Surrealism with his interpretation of Prometheus as the primordial artists marking the epochal change from matriarchal to patriarchal cultures and the pyramid as the symbol of "Mother-Earth" derived from the appearance of a new volcano; together with Gordon Onslow Ford and Jacqueline Johnson he had visited the just rising volcano Paricutin.

The sixth and last number was entirely dedicated to contemporary modern art, introduced by Paalen´s essay "On the Meaning of Cubism Today", in which he draws cubism as the model for the self-reflecting potential and the implicit spatiality of the pure means rhythm, light and colour in painting. Robert Motherwell published his essay "The Modern Painter´s World", other essays and poetical texts were added by Jacqueline Johnson ("The Earth" and "Exposition Alice Paalen"), Miguel Covarrubias ("La Venta"), Anaïs Nin ("The Eye´s Journey"), Gustav Regler ("L´Île à Deux Faces" and "Rencontre des Villes"), César Moro ("Le Temps") and Eva Sulzer ("Rêves de Papillons").

== Reception ==
Breton admitted in 1944 that Paalen´s criticism of Surrealism was justified and that "we (the Surrealists) have left the whole licence to Paalen, who could say whatever he liked, without having the means to say something against or at least put something at his level. Paalen is winning on the whole line."

With the exception of Totem Art, all essays were republished in Form and Sense by Robert Motherwell in New York in 1945 in occasion of Paalen´s one-man-show at Peggy Guggenheim´s Art of This Century Gallery. The number Possibilities, in which the young New York artists published their first statements, was the second number of this series.

The positive impact on New York's younger generation of artists and their first publications, such as Possibilities (ed. by Motherwell and Rosenblum in 1947) was crucial. Motherwell translated Paalen's programmatical essay "Image Nouvelle" into English ("The New Image"). Motherwell's collage Surprise and Inspiration (Peggy Guggenheim Collection) was named after Paalen's essay with the same title. Motherwell had translated this article for DYN and the collage was published next to it.

== See also ==
- Acéphale, a Surrealist review created by Georges Bataille, published from 1936 to 1939
- Documents, a Surrealist magazine edited by Georges Bataille from 1929 to 1930
- Minotaure, a primarily Surrealist-oriented publication founded by Albert Skira, published in Paris from 1933 to 1939
- La Révolution surréaliste, a seminal Surrealist publication founded by André Breton, published in Paris from 1924 to 1929
- View, an American art magazine, primarily covering avant-garde and Surrealist art, published from 1940 to 1947
- VVV, a Surrealist magazine published in New York between 1942 and 1944 under the aegis of André Breton.

== Sources ==
- Kloyber, Christian, ed. Wolfgang Paalen’s DYN: The Complete Reprint. Vienna and New York: Springer, 2000.
- Winter, Amy, Wolfgang Paalen: Artist and Theorist of the Avant-Garde. Westport, Connecticut and London: Praeger, 2003.
