= Pays interdit =

Surrealist painting by Wolfgang Paalen

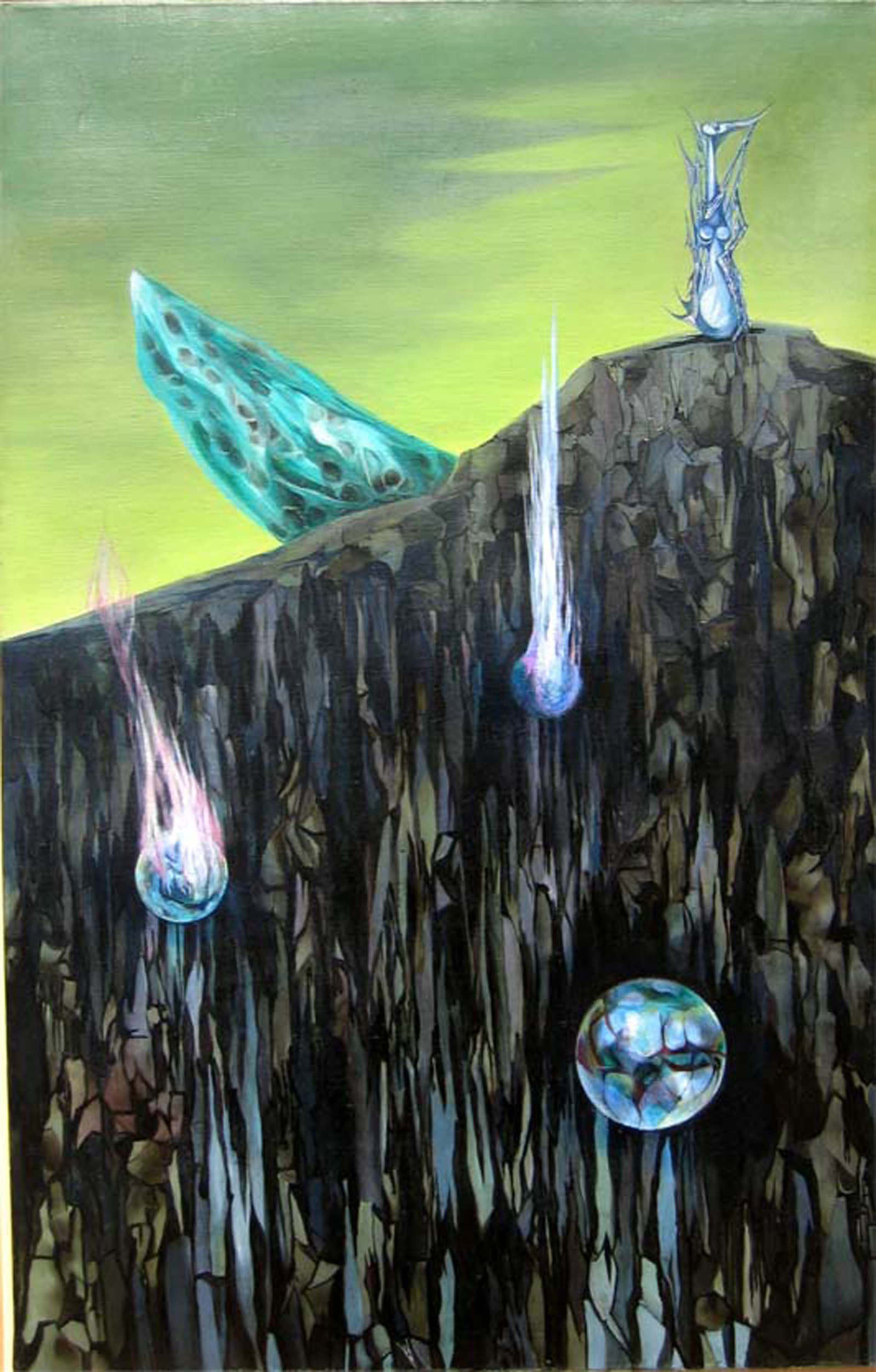
Verbotenes Land ("Forbidden Land"), 1936

Pays interdit (Forbidden Land) is a surrealist painting by Wolfgang Paalen, originally called L´upyre, which in the final version of 1937 shows a drop-shaped stylized idol of femininity with tentacle-like arms, that stands in precarious proximity to an abyss opening unexpectedly in dark-crystalline forms to the observer. Three spherical space-bodies hover in front of them, two of which are shaped like falling, burning meteorites. The painting is the first oil painting by Paalen, that is artfully based on his surrealist technique of fumage. It explores the theme of mortal fears and primordial femininity with a hermetical iconography. The painting is presently in a private collection.

== Background ==
Paalen started to work on this picture during the first two weeks of October 1936 after a severe psychogenic crisis. In August 1936, he had to learn that a prolonged affair of Pablo Picasso with his wife Alice (Alice Rahon) had led to a pregnancy and abortion. Paalen later commented on the depressions which he could finally channel into a proper furor of creation resulting in some of his best works of the surrealist period: "It was as if the fire, or the germ to it, collapsed into itself, and in its place all that is terrible comes to the fore. (...) My vision has once more turned inward. I now can say rightly, I contemplate like the old pagan Apollonius, from within."

Back in Paris after a realigning journey to Greece in October 1936, he began to work on the mysterious picture that would occupy him until the following year and should testimony this fall into the abyss of death almost solemnly described with reference to the mystic Apollonius of Tyana: an apocalyptic landscape dominated by a female deity and falling meteoric planets. Pays interdit is also the first oil painting in which the Fumage is elaborately worked into the fine crystalline structures of the lower part. Paalen designs his personal model of the permeable surreal soul-image in the form of a fragmented landscape, pulsating with a mixture of feminine mysticism and romantic shudder, reminiscent of pre-Celtic fairies and their cosmic allusions as they are known from the lyrical tradition of Brittany. The poet friend André Breton spoke in view of this prototype for the later great Fumages from 1937–39 of symbols for a kind of extended inner view: "Paalen´s secret lies in having succeeded in seeing, in letting us see from the inside of the bubble."

== Description ==
Striking in this picture is the colour in the upper part – subtly graded green tones, which look as if painted on gold – and in the lower part a fine execution of expanding crystalline spatial structures, suggestions of mucous membranes and moist inner tissue. The Fumage-spots are only visible in some places like black holes. The arm- and legless stone figure with its balloon-shaped body parts – belly, breasts and head – was biographically interpreted as a mythologized portrait of the friend Eva Sulzer, to whom Paalen refuged during the crisis with his wife: as a kind of Eva of the future, a woman, which was not born, but owes its life directly to the divine forces. Even unintentionally, she embodies the navel of the world where the past and the future are touching, a unity of womb, uterus and mother, or as James Joyce described it: "Heva. Naked Eva. She had no navel. Look."

Paalen had previously visited the oracle in Delphi with its Omphalos, the rounded, symbolic stone column for the navel of the world, that reportedly fell from the sky as a meteorite triggered by lightning and subsequently used as a sacrificial stone altar of the goddess Gaia. Delphi is devoted to the earth goddess Gaia (from "delphos" – Greek womb), and with her oracle, once reconfigured by the female priestess Pythia, was surely one of the dream places on the inner map of the artist, looking for deep symbols for birth and linguistic forms for an original femininity communicating directly from the uterus. Paalen's friend, the German writer Gustav Regler, spoke in view of the image of his "realm of Amazons": "On a planet, that is circling around the great streets, quietly and musingly, lies the realm. (...) And he calls one queen, since she can not hide herself; Her tall figure turnes every branch of a tree under which she stands, into a floriferous homage; (...) / time is to him invasion of space / and is to be measured according to the number of comets that hit upon her element, that made her visible and luminous, that consumed and nourished her. (...) like meteors in the desert."

The fertility symbolism of the figure and the larger, transparent one of the three spheres with the enclosed allusions for earth, femininity, erosion and an enfolding pre-birth space stand together in a compositional harmony, hieratically floating in front of the impenetrable thicket of the terrestrial abyss. The idea of the meteorite attacks had perhaps come from the reading of Camille Flammarion's visionary novel La Fin du Monde in which Eve was destined to contemplate the dying earth after a meteorite impact until her own icing.

== Title ==
The painting was not titled by the artist on the back of the canvas, as usually was the case. It appears under the title L'upyre in the catalogue of the exhibition at the Julien Levy Gallery, New York 1940; on the preserved exhibition list the title Pays interdit is added. The painting is one of the first acquisitions of Gordon Onslow Ford, who eventually bought the painting in New York in 1941 to generate funds on Paalen's initiative for the necessary guarantees for the departure of the Surrealists imprisoned in Marseille, in particular André Breton (it was in storage at Julien Levy until then). Onslow Ford has kept it in his private collection ever since. It was never loaned from there for exhibitions. For Ida Prampolini's large publication El Surrealismo y el Arte Fantastico de Mexico, Mexico (IIE) 1969, an archival photograph by André Caillet from Paalen's Paris holdings, which reproduces the state of 1936, served as the basis for printing. Both titles are noted on the reverse of the photograph, which is now in the Library of the Wolfgang Paalen Society, Berlin

== Literature ==
- Andreas Neufert: Wolfgang Paalen. Im Inneren des Wals. Springer, Wien und New York 1999 (Monography with Catalogue raisonné).
- Dieter Schrage (1999). "Paalen, Wolfgang Robert". Neue Deutsche Biographie (in German). Vol. 19. Berlin: Duncker & Humblot. pp. 733–734. (full text online).
- Amy Winter: Wolfgang Paalen. Artist and Theorist of the Avantgarde Praeger, Westport (Connecticut) 2002.
- Andreas Neufert: Auf Liebe und Tod. Das Leben des Surrealisten Wolfgang Paalen. Parthas, Berlin 2015, ISBN 978-3-86964-083-9.
- Andreas Neufert: Paalen. Life and Work. I. Forbidden Land, The Early and Crucial Years 1905 - 1959. Berlin/Hamburg, 2022, p. 250 (illustrated in color), 251 (state of 1936, ill.) and front cover page ISBN 978-3-756-85887-3.
