= Surrealism Beyond Borders =

2021–2022 international Surrealism exhibition at the Met and Tate Modern

- 2021–2022 Exhibition at the Metropolitan Museum of Art and Tate Modern
- Country: United States; United Kingdom
- Location: New York City; London
- Opened: Metropolitan Museum of Art (The Met Fifth Avenue), 11 October 2021 – 30 January 2022
- Closed: Tate Modern, 24 February – 29 August 2022
- Exhibited: More than 300 works of art
- Curator: Stephanie D'Alessandro; Matthew Gale
- Organiser: The Metropolitan Museum of Art; Tate Modern
- Followed by: www.metmuseum.org/exhibitions/surrealism-beyond-borders

Notes
- The exhibition reconsiders Surrealism as a transnational movement across geography and chronology, presenting works produced across 45 or more countries over almost eight decades.

Surrealism Beyond Borders was a 2021–2022 exhibition co-organized by the Metropolitan Museum of Art (the Met) and Tate Modern that reconsidered Surrealism as a transnational movement across geography and chronology. It was first presented at the Met (11 October 2021 – 30 January 2022) and then at Tate Modern (24 February – 29 August 2022).

Spanning nearly eight decades of work and artists from 45 countries, the exhibition traced networks of surrealist practice and exchange beyond a primarily Western European frame, including routes that linked regions such as Eastern Europe, the Caribbean, Asia, North Africa, Australia, and Latin America. In the accompanying catalogue, the curators and contributors positioned the project as a historiographic intervention—moving beyond a Paris-centered narrative and challenging linear “influence” models in order to offer a more inclusive account of Surrealism's global significance from the 1920s through the late 1970s.

Contemporary reviews described the exhibition as a major work of scholarship and an explicitly “teaching” survey, while also noting the challenges of presenting such breadth at blockbuster scale.

== Background ==
In art-historical surveys and museum presentations, Surrealism has often been narrated as a movement originating in Paris in the early 1920s and closely identified with André Breton and the Paris circle. The exhibition catalogue describes this “received” account as cumulative and persistent, repeated across historical surveys and exhibitions, and reinforced in art-history texts and museum labels over time.

The catalogue further notes that this Paris-centered storyline commonly falters with the outbreak of World War II in 1939, as the personal and political circumstances of artists and writers in the circle (including internment, censorship pressures, underground activity, and exile) disrupted any sense of continuity and helped shift Surrealism's geographic and institutional conditions. In the conventional postwar narrative, Paris is frequently understood to cede its role as the international artistic center to New York, and Surrealism is often described as fading with the ascendancy of Abstract Expressionism; later splits after Breton's death (1966) reinforced a tendency to consign the movement to the past.

Surrealism Beyond Borders frames itself against the assumptions produced by this inherited narrative—especially the tendency for centralized, Paris-focused chronologies and “canonical” sites of activity to eclipse a wider international scope—and proposes a broader historiographical view attentive to exchange, relay, imperial and colonial contexts, and the conditions of exile and displacement.

== Curatorial approach ==
According to the exhibition catalogue, Surrealism Beyond Borders was conceived to move away from a Paris-centered account of Surrealism and to reassess the movement's worldwide significance from the 1920s to the late 1970s, treating it not as a single, monolithic school but as a dynamic set of practices adapted across different artistic, cultural, social, and political situations.

The catalogue describes the project as challenging the “simple linear trajectory of influence” that has shaped many historical accounts, and instead proposes a framework organized through multiple, intersecting routes and points of relay for ideas, exchange, and shared concerns across regions and communities.

A key methodological principle is what the catalogue calls a “history of rhizomatic connectivity”: a model that emphasizes adjacency and exchange across multiple sites and events—“synchronic and overlapping, rather than a progression of heredity and influence.”

Within this approach, the publication maps intersecting “paths” (including “Points of Convergence”, “Horizons”, and “Constellations”) and thematic groupings (such as “Thoughts in Transmission”, “Travel, Exile, and Displacement”, “The Fantasy and Fallacy of Elsewhere”, and “Under Pressure”), foregrounding both the media through which Surrealism circulated (including journals, radio, and film) and the twentieth-century conditions that shaped its transnational networks (technology, geopolitics, colonialism, racism, persecution, and displacement).

The editors also note that André Breton organized a retrospectively numbered series of eleven “official” Surrealist exhibitions from 1935 to 1965—including the London International Exhibition of Surrealism (1936) and the Paris Exposition Internationale du Surréalisme (1938)—and that the emphasis on centralized interaction produced “blind spots” that Surrealism Beyond Borders seeks to address.

== Venues and dates ==
Surrealism Beyond Borders was developed as a transatlantic collaboration and staged in two successive presentations—first at the Metropolitan Museum of Art (The Met Fifth Avenue) in New York, then at Tate Modern in London—reflecting its co-organization by the two institutions. The Met described the exhibition as spanning almost eight decades and works produced across 45 or more countries.

Venue	City	Dates	Notes
Metropolitan Museum of Art (The Met Fifth Avenue)	New York City	11 October 2021 – 30 January 2022	On view at The Met Fifth Avenue (Gallery 899).
Tate Modern	London	24 February 2022 – 29 August 2022	Presented at Tate Modern in the Eyal Ofer Galleries.

== Exhibition contents ==
=== Organizing framework: intersecting paths ===
The curators framed the project as an attempt to move beyond familiar, well-charted accounts of Surrealism by developing a more nuanced definition from transnational and transhistoric perspectives. Rather than tracing a linear progression of heredity and influence, the catalogue outlines a model of “rhizomatic connectivity” that emphasizes adjacency and exchange over hierarchy, drawing together threads from multiple sites and events that are “synchronic, overlapping, and mutually enriching.” It also states that the project temporarily sets aside the conventional narrative in order to challenge hierarchies of cultural dominance—despite Surrealism's own radical claims—often shaped by race, class, gender, access, and privilege.

In the catalogue's overview of the exhibition, this approach is described as a “dynamic, transhistoric, and transnational system of intersecting paths”—a set of overlapping routes intended to “redraw a map of the world in the time of the Surrealists,” rather than a single chronological storyline.

The framework combines broad geographic and temporal “paths” (from the interwar years through the 1970s) with thematic routes—including “Points of Convergence,” “Horizons,” “Constellations,” “Thoughts in Transmission,” “Travel, Exile, and Displacement,” “The Fantasy and Fallacy of Elsewhere,” and “Under Pressure”—to highlight Surrealism's circulation across media, places, and political conditions.

=== Points of Convergence ===
In the exhibition catalogue, Points of Convergence is presented as one of the project's intersecting paths, bringing together essays and case studies of sites and infrastructures through which Surrealism found traction and group participation.

Examples range from the Bureau de recherches surréalistes in Paris and the workshops of Atelier 17 to Caribbean contexts such as Fort-de-France and Port-au-Prince, and to amateur photo clubs in cities including Nagoya and Osaka.

By foregrounding such meeting points, studios, and informal networks, the catalogue frames Surrealism as a set of convergences and exchanges rather than a single linear narrative centered on one metropolis.

=== Horizons ===
In the exhibition catalogue, Horizons is presented as one of the project's intersecting paths, bringing together essays that consider Surrealism in contrast to other visual and cultural forms, or belief systems, that appeared to adjoin it. The catalogue notes that these comparisons often reflect tensions between Surrealism's international ambitions and the force of regional cultural formations.

The catalogue gives examples in which Surrealism was acknowledged but largely resisted because similar contemporary concerns were already strongly articulated in parallel movements, citing Neue Sachlichkeit (New Objectivity) in Germany and Brazilian Antropofagia; it also emphasizes that such adjacency could, in other cases, open a space for symbiosis rather than opposition.

In addition, the catalogue highlights instances in which religious traditions could find accommodation with Surrealism in specific local contexts, including ancient Sufi practices in Turkish calligraphy, reflections on transience in Thai Sur, and forms of Catholicism in the Philippines—despite Catholicism being a frequent target of rejection among the Paris Surrealists.

=== Constellations ===
Curatorial materials emphasize that Surrealism Beyond Borders is neither a singular narrative nor a linear chronology; instead, it traces multiple routes through Surrealism and highlights shared interests across regions, including points of convergence, relay, and exchange.

In the exhibition catalogue, this non-linear approach is also reflected in a set of thematic “constellations” (essays and case studies organized around recurring Surrealist concerns). These include topics such as Beyond reason, The work of dreams, Automatism, Bodies of desire, The uncanny of everyday life, The poetic object, Alternative orders, Violence and revolution, and Collective identity.

One gallery section titled “Beyond Reason” situates Surrealist challenges to rational order within a global field, noting that this aspect of Surrealism was also adapted to address specific national contexts (including interwar Japan). See also Surrealism in Japan.

=== Thematic routes ===
==== Thoughts in Transmission ====
In the exhibition catalogue, Thoughts in Transmission frames Surrealism as a movement shaped through modern communications—especially little magazines/journals, radio, and film—that enabled artists to circulate ideas, translate texts, extend networks across national boundaries, and connect diasporic communities, while also being constrained at times by political, economic, or social barriers.

The chapter notes that Surrealist groups often defined affinities through the publication of periodicals, which disseminated poetry, polemics, translations of manifestos, reproductions of artworks, and news of exhibitions, sometimes even serving as a platform for organizing exhibitions.

It further describes how film and radio could reach new audiences in different ways: film circulated internationally through screenings, while radio formats such as reports, interviews, and radio dramas offered an unusually direct mode of transmission across space—and, in reception, across time.

==== Travel, Exile, and Displacement ====
In the exhibition catalogue, Travel, Exile, and Displacement is framed as a thematic route that takes as its starting point the Surrealist condition of dépaysement (“being unlanded”), a term that the editors note is rendered in different contexts as “disorientation,” “displacement,” and “defamiliarization.” Set against twentieth-century political and social upheavals, the catalogue argues that Surrealist strategies of becoming “unmoored” (from a homeland or a state of mind) are inseparable from the lived realities of displaced peoples, exiles, and various diasporas, and it draws an explicit connection between Surrealism's dépaysement and postcolonialism's “worlding.” To explore this condition, it develops the theme through four case studies of itinerant artists—Eugenio F. Granell, Eva Sulzer, Joyce Mansour, and Ted Joans—whose Surrealism and identities were shaped by travel and dislocation.

==== The Fantasy and Fallacy of Elsewhere ====
In the exhibition catalogue, The Fantasy and Fallacy of Elsewhere is presented as a thematic route that follows Surrealism's entanglements with empire—treating struggles against imperialism and colonialism as a recurring through line, and noting how political, social, and economic imbalances shaped connections as well as patterns of inclusion and exclusion within Surrealist networks.

As a key historical touchstone, the catalogue discusses the Paris group's denunciation of the 1931 Exposition coloniale internationale. It notes that the Surrealists issued the tract Ne visitez pas l’exposition coloniale (Do Not Visit the Colonial Exhibition) and organized a counter-exhibition, La vérité sur les colonies (The Truth about the Colonies), framing these actions as challenges to colonial power and expressions of solidarity with colonized peoples.

At the same time, the route emphasizes a persistent tension between Surrealism's rhetoric of freedom and anticolonialism and the movement's fascination with an exoticized, unknown “Other”. It also traces how works by makers in colonized societies circulated through Surrealist collections—gaining symbolic status (including in André Breton’s studio) and later entering public museums via collections such as those of Peggy Guggenheim and Roland Penrose.

The catalogue further situates these dynamics within the period's knowledge infrastructures, describing how some Surrealists (and adjacent circles) drew on ethnography and anthropology—for example, around Georges Bataille and the journal Documents, or around Wolfgang Paalen’s Mexico City–based journal Dyn—and notes figures such as Taro Okamoto, Léopold Sédar Senghor, and Léon-Gontran Damas studying ethnology at the Sorbonne with Marcel Mauss.

==== Under Pressure ====
In the exhibition catalogue, Under Pressure is presented as a thematic route examining the conditions under which artists practiced Surrealism while confronting social convention, censorship, and authoritarianism.

The chapter frames Surrealism not only as a set of motifs or styles but also as a practice pursued under pressure—sometimes publicly through provocation, and at other times through private, clandestine, or underground channels—where association with the movement could carry severe consequences.

The route draws together case studies across different political contexts, including political violence surrounding the 1935 Exposición surrealista in Tenerife; clandestine Surrealist publishing under wartime occupation; and later Cold War-era repression in Prague, where Surrealist activity was monitored and periodically forced underground. In its discussion of East Asia, the catalogue notes that, under rising militarism in late 1930s Japan, Surrealists including the photographer-poet Kansuke Yamamoto were arrested by the Special Higher Police (Tokubetsu Keisatsu), situating Japanese Surrealist production within a broader global history of surveillance and repression addressed by the exhibition. The catalogue also notes that after its tour in Tokyo, Kyoto, and Osaka, Kaigai Chōgenjitsushugi Sakuhin ten was presented at Nagoya’s Maruzen Gallery in July 1937 and “stimulated Surrealist activities across the country,” inspiring the reorganization of existing groups and the formation of new collectives; this response was often subsumed under the broader euphemistic label “avant-garde” in terms acceptable to state censors.

== Selected artists and works ==
Because the exhibition brought together more than 300 works across multiple media and regions, published accounts typically discuss it through selected examples rather than exhaustive lists.

The Met's press materials highlighted, among other pairings and contrasts, canonical works such as Salvador Dalí's Lobster Telephone and René Magritte imagery alongside less familiar, regionally inflected Surrealist works, including a juxtaposition of Max Ernst’s Two Children Are Threatened by a Nightingale (1924) with a painting by the Argentine artist Antonio Berni (1932). The same materials also pointed to later global extensions of Surrealism, such as Skunder Boghossian’s Night Flight of Dread and Delight (1964), described in relation to the artist’s encounter with the work of Wifredo Lam and Roberto Matta.

Other examples singled out in the press release include the eroticized photography of Hans Bellmer, Ithell Colquhoun’s Scylla (1938), and photographs by Lionel Wendt, framed in relation to queer desire and local social context.

In the thematic route “Under Pressure,” the exhibition catalogue notes that, under rising militarism in late 1930s Japan, Surrealists such as the photographer-poet Kansuke Yamamoto were suspected of communist sympathies and arrested by the Tokubetsu Keisatsu (Special Higher Police).

=== Selected artists and works (examples) ===
The Metropolitan Museum of Art's published wall text and object labels for the New York presentation identify works and materials by a wide range of artists and writers associated with Surrealism and its global reception. Examples include the following (non-exhaustive):

- André Breton
- Eileen Agar
- Benjamin Péret
- Max Ernst
- René Magritte
- Salvador Dalí
- Leonora Carrington
- Dorothea Tanning
- Yves Tanguy
- Man Ray
- Toyen
- Jean Arp
- Óscar Domínguez
- André Masson
- Roberto Matta
- Remedios Varo
- Wolfgang Paalen
- Wifredo Lam
- Hector Hyppolite
- Yayoi Kusama
- Kansuke Yamamoto

== Catalogue ==
The exhibition was accompanied by an illustrated catalogue, Surrealism Beyond Borders, edited by the co-curators Stephanie D'Alessandro and Matthew Gale and published by The Metropolitan Museum of Art; it was distributed by Yale University Press.

The Met describes the volume as a 384-page publication with 340 illustrations, tracing Surrealism's influence and legacy from the 1920s to the late 1970s across multiple regions and including more than 300 works of art in a variety of media.

According to the museum's press materials, the catalogue includes contributions from 47 international scholars and addresses themes such as the transmission of ideas, artists’ responses to political oppression and social unrest (including the effects of colonialism), and experiences of displacement and exile in the twentieth century.

In a foreword to the catalogue, the museum directors frame the project as moving away from a Paris-centered account toward a more inclusive understanding of Surrealism's international reach and continuing significance.

The catalogue was made possible by The Andrew W. Mellon Foundation and the Doris Duke Fund for Publications.

== Reception ==
Critics generally described Surrealism Beyond Borders as an ambitious attempt to revise Surrealism's historiography by moving beyond a primarily Western European orientation, while also noting the practical and interpretive challenges of presenting such breadth at exhibition scale.

In The Guardian, Sean O’Hagan called the Tate presentation a “tremendous work of scholarship” full of discoveries, but argued that the exhibition's scope could feel difficult to absorb in a single visit because it moved rapidly across many regions and contexts.

Writing in the London Review of Books, Hal Foster framed the exhibition as part of a broader critical effort to “provincialize Europe” and to reassess European modernism in relation to global and imperial histories; he also emphasized that the show extends Surrealism's chronology beyond the conventional break around 1939 and treats its international networks as continuing across wartime and postwar contexts.

In The New Yorker, Peter Schjeldahl described the Met presentation as a large, entertaining survey and praised the curators for demonstrating how Surrealism emerged in individuals and groups across many places, while also reflecting on contradictions in the movement's politics and its histories of gender and colonialism.

A scholarly exhibition review by Emma Skinner in the Journal of Surrealism and the Americas likewise characterized the project as a successful revisionist approach that convincingly presents Surrealism as a multi-decade, multi-site movement, while noting that the breadth of the curators’ framing can complicate clear definitions of what constitutes “the movement” in stylistic terms.

== Legacy and scholarship ==
In later art-historical commentary, Surrealism Beyond Borders has been discussed as a major attempt to recast Surrealism as a globally networked modern movement rather than a narrative centered on Paris, and as an effort to operationalize an inclusive, postcolonial framework at large institutional scale. Commentators have also noted the interpretive and logistical limits that accompany such breadth, including questions of emphasis, omission, and the difficulty of fully accounting for local histories within a single survey format.

The accompanying catalogue has also been treated as a durable scholarly reference point. In an exhibition review, Emma Skinner characterized the volume as functioning like a “textbook” on Surrealism and highlighted its scale (including fifty essays and extensive plates), framing it as part of a broader revisionist turn in Surrealism studies and museum practice.

Beyond art history, the exhibition has been cited as one example of a recent wave of projects that decenter European surrealism and foreground global circulations, resonating with wider academic discussions of decolonization and transnational method. In parallel art-historical scholarship, Iwona Kossowska has pointed to Surrealism Beyond Borders as among exhibitions that signal the growing prominence of “transnational” surrealism research agendas within both academic and curatorial spheres.

== See also ==
- Surrealism
- Surrealist art
- Metropolitan Museum of Art
- Tate Modern
- International Surrealist Exhibition (1936)
- Kaigai Chōgenjitsushugi Sakuhin Ten (1937)
- Exposition Internationale du Surréalisme (1938)
- Nagoya Photo Avant-Garde
- Kansuke Yamamoto
