= Galería de Arte Mexicano =

Coordinates: 19°24′47″N 99°11′13″W

The Galería de Arte Mexicano (GAM) was founded by Carolina in 1935 and directed by Inés Amor, her sister from 1936 until the ’80s, in Mexico City and has been the first gallery of Mexican art. The gallery building was the first building in Mexico of Andrés Casillas de Alba.

The intention of the GAM is to establish national artists as well as the promotion of young artists. The collection of the GAM includes items of modern, Mexican and contemporary art. In January 1940 the gallery opened its first exhibition of Surrealist art organized by French writer and group leader André Breton, the Austrian Surrealist Wolfgang Paalen, artist and poet Alice Rahon, and the Peruvian poet César Moro. Altogether the GAM organized more than 900 exhibitions including well-known exhibitors like Diego Rivera, José Clemente Orozco, David Alfaro Siqueiros, Miguel Covarrubias, Miguel Condé, Rufino Tamayo, Jorge Flores, Frida Kahlo, Agustín Lazo Adalid, Federico Cantú Garza, Jesús Guerrero Galván, Luis Ortiz Monasterio, Emilio Rosenblueth and others.
