= Valentine Penrose =

French surrealist poet, author and collagist (1898–1978)

- Penrose photographed by Eileen Agar (cropped)
- Born: Valentine Boué; 1 January 1898; Mont-de-Marsan, Landes, France
- Died: 7 August 1978 (aged 80); Chiddingly, East Sussex, England
- Occupations: Poet, author, collagist
- Spouse: Roland Penrose (m. 1925; div. 1937)

Valentine Penrose (née Boué; 1 January 1898 – 7 August 1978) was a French surrealist poet, author, and collagist.

== Life and career ==
Valentine Boué was born in 1898 to a military family in Mont-de-Marsan, Landes, France. The family moved to Paris when she was very young.

In 1925, she married the English artist, historian and poet Roland Penrose (1900–1984) and joined the community of surrealists based in Paris, Mougins and England. The marriage was never consummated. Boué and her husband moved to Spain in 1936 during the Spanish Civil War. In the same year she joined the workers militia in Spain to defend the revolution. Valentine and Roland had different viewpoints on traditions in India, Eastern thought, and philosophy, which all led to a growing distance between the two. They were divorced in 1937, but met again in London during the war, after which she lived half her time with her ex-husband and his second wife, the American photojournalist Lee Miller. This arrangement continued for the rest of her life.

She joined the French Army in 1940.

She died on 7 August 1978 in Chiddingly, East Sussex, England, in the house of her former husband.

Boué was an independent woman who pushed against the social expectations set on her; as a woman she was expected to be a muse and object for male surrealist artists.

== Literary style and influences ==
Penrose first encountered surrealism in the late 1920s. She was one of the first of four women to become involved in the surrealist movement. Penrose was involved in the publication of Andre Breton's inaugural issue of La Révolution surréaliste; she was one of eight other women who were involved with the journal. Her first publication in the journal was a response to the 1929 "Inquiry on love" in La Révolution surréaliste no. 12.

Penrose wrote surrealist poetry, although she is perhaps best known for her biography of the serial killer Elizabeth Báthory (1560-1614). Her poetry reflects her experience of automatic writing, collage and painting techniques such as Max Ernst's frottage and Wolfgang Paalen's fumage. It is said that her works stem from transgression and the reconstruction of defiance. For a female artist of her time it was unconventional for a woman to illustrate such erotic and violent works. The difference between Ernst and Penrose is that Ernst's work represents an over-dramatic dream sequence with dysfunctional and bizarre relationships whereas Penrose's illustrates the travels of two women and their erotic adventures.

Penrose was interested in female mysticism, Eastern philosophy, Western mysticism, alchemy and the occult. In 1929, during a trip to Egypt, she met the Spanish archaeologist and professor of philosophy Vicente Galarza y Pérez Castañeda, knows as Count Galarza de Santa Clara, a master of the esoteric, and made several visits to his ashram in India. She studied Sanskrit while in India. In 1936 she made an extended visit to India with the poet and painter Alice Paalen (later Alice Rahon). They become very close and their relationship is shown in their poetry from 1936 to about 1945. It is believed that the two had a relationship while in India based on the lesbian attributes present in their work at that time. After their trip in India, they didn't see each other again.

From 1937, she started writing on lesbianism, always with the same lovers: Emily and Rubia. This dominates Martha's Opéra (1945), and Dons des Féminines (1951).

Penrose's work was admired by Paul Éluard, who wrote prefaces for her first collection Herbe à la lune (1935) and Dons des féminines (1951). The works in Dons des féminines were greatly inspired by Alice Rohan. She also knew the surrealist poet André Breton.

She collaborated on a few pieces including London Bulletin, VVV, Dyn, and Free Unions.

== Collage ==
In the 1940s, Penrose made surrealist collages. Dons des Féminines (1951) combines her collages and poetry. One of her collages is The Real Women, 1938.

Penrose's collage artwork utilizes formal elements of Surrealism while disapproving of the conceptual aspects of Surrealist art, most often in relation to gender roles. She was most outspoken about the brutality and misogyny sometimes depicted by Surrealists and was highly critical of certain figures within the movement, such as Max Ernst, who was also notable for his use of collage as a medium. Her husband, Roland Penrose, was a primarily visual artist who was a notable figure within the Surrealist movement while associating Valentine Penrose with other Surrealist artists. Much of Valentine Penrose's art was created using traditional art and collage images which were sourced from common publications such as journals, catalogues and books. Her portfolio includes various collages and a collage novel entitled Dons des Féminines, which incorporated her literary background in its composition. Dons des Féminines has been called the "archetypal surrealist book" since it uses compositional elements that are expected of Surrealist art. The format is fragmented and uses bilingual poetry in combination with the visual imagery of the collages to create disorientation and continuous translation. The images are arranged to create juxtapositions and lack of continuity and become increasingly complex. There are references to Penrose's other, more cohesive, literary work but the novel does not have a singular format. The background for the works is typically of natural scenery or a landscape in which foreign elements are added, sometimes symbolically to create paradoxes. The recurring themes throughout the novel are gender ambiguity, love and prophetic writing. Lesbian love, in particular, is an important theme in much of Penrose's work, but especially in Dons des féminines. Lesbian love is indeed a crucial theme in the book because it recounts the romantic escape of two women and their dreamlike adventures together. In addition, the author-collagist mentions the city of "Mytilene" to evoke the Sapphic island of Lesbos. This reference to the Mediterranean shows that exoticism is an important theme of the work, but also that Penrose inscribes herself into the Sapphic tradition of Renée Vivien, Natalie Barney or Charles Baudelaire to just a few emblematic figures.

== Publications ==
=== French poetry ===
- Penrose, Valentine (1935). Herbe à la lune. Éluard, Paul (preface). Editions GLM.
- — (1937). Sorts de la lueur. Editions GLM.
- — (1937). Poèmes. Editions GLM.
- — (1951). Dons des Féminines. Éluard, Paul (preface); Penrose, Valentine (illustrator). Les pas Perdus. (Collages and poems by Valentine Penrose. One edition had additional illustrations by Pablo Picasso).
- — (1972). Les Magies. Les Mains Libres.
- — (2001). Colville, Georgiana M. M. (ed.). Ecrits d'une femme surréaliste. Paris: J. Losfeld. ISBN 978-2844120915. (Anthology of works of Valentine Penrose)

=== French prose ===
- — (1936). Le Nouveau Candide. Editions GLM.
- — (1945). Martha's Opéra. Fontaine.
- — (1962). Erzsébet Báthory la Comtesse sanglante. Gallimard / Mercure de France.

=== Works translated into English ===
- — (1977). Poems and Narrations. Translated by Edwards, R. Littlehampton Book Services Ltd. ISBN 978-0856352072.
- — (2006). The Bloody Countess: Atrocities of Erzsébet Báthory. Translated by Trocchi, Alexander. Solar Books. ISBN 978-0-9714578-2-9. (Translation of Erzsébet Báthory la Comtesse sanglante)

== Filmography ==
Penrose acted in the following films:

- L'Age d'Or (1930), directed by Luis Buñuel
- La Garoupe (1937), directed by Man Ray
