= Esteban Francés =

Surrealist artist

- Born: 1913; Portbou, Girona, Spain
- Died: 1976 (aged 62–63); Deià, Majorca, Spain
- Known for: Painting
- Movement: Surrealism

Esteban Francés (30 July 1913 – 21 September 1976) was a Spanish surrealist painter.

== Biography ==
Born in Portbou, Girona in 1913, he spent his first years in Figueras, until 1925, when he moved with his family to Barcelona. There he studied law, but gave up shortly before finishing and instead enrolled at the Escola de la Llotja.

Francés was an important member of the surrealist movements in Paris, Mexico, and New York City. He fled the Spanish Civil War and traveled to Paris where he became a member of the surrealist circle that included André Breton, Yves Tanguy, Óscar Domínguez, Victor Brauner, Roberto Matta and Gordon Onslow Ford, amongst others. In the 1930s Francés became romantically involved with the important Spanish/Mexican painter Remedios Varo.

Irène Hamoir re-tells the story of a violent argument, which took place in 1938, between Dominguez, Louis Scutenaire and Francés. Victor Brauner attempted to protect Francés and was hit by a glass thrown by Domínguez. He was permanently deprived of his left eye as a result. Also present were Paul Éluard, Georges Hugnet, Wolfgang Paalen, Benjamin Péret and Tanguy.
