= Gordon Onslow Ford =

American artist (1912–2003)

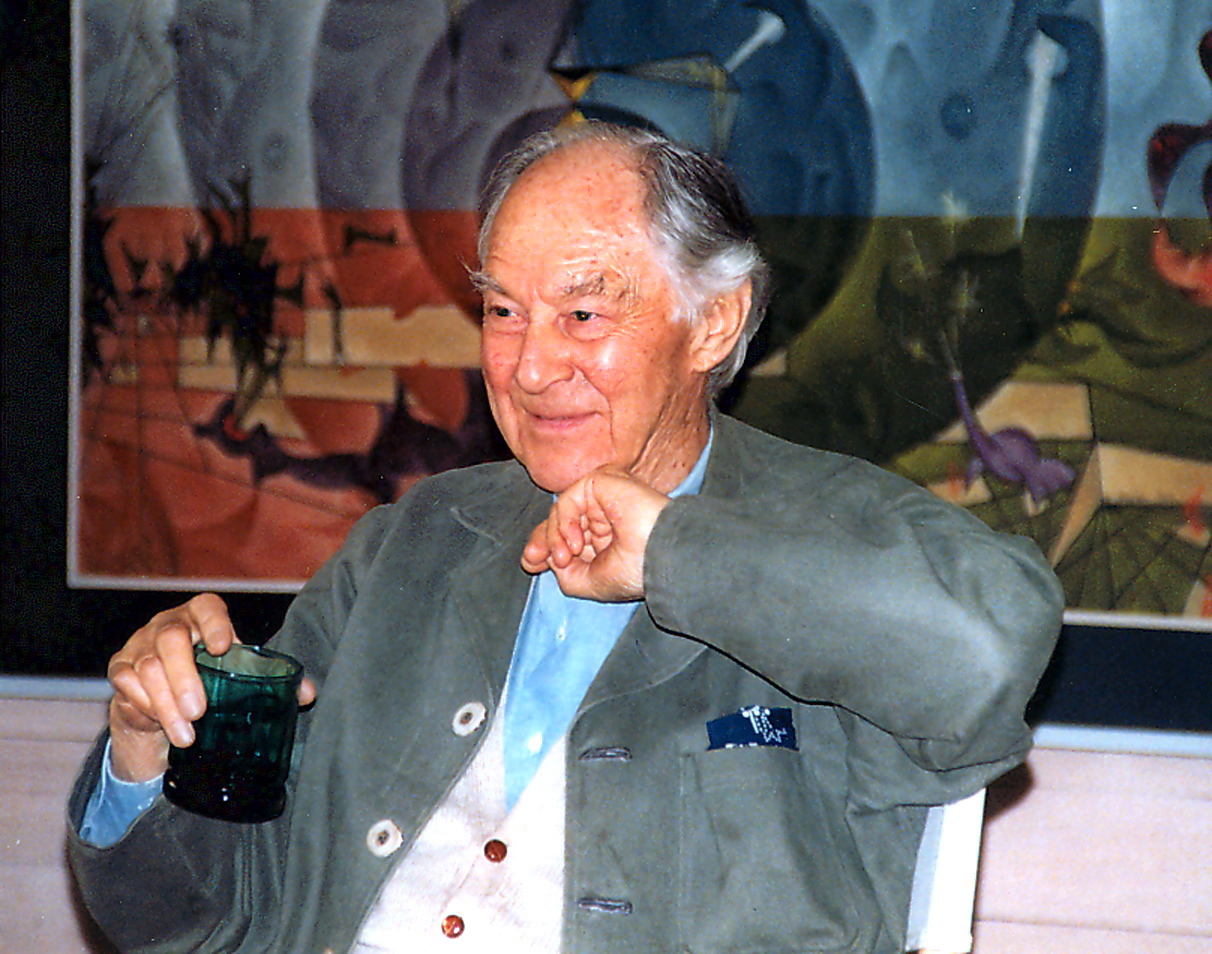
- Born: 26 December 1912; Wendover, England
- Died: 9 November 2003; Inverness, California
- Known for: Painter
- Spouse: Jacqueline Johnson
- Website: onslowford.com

Gordon Onslow Ford (26 December 1912 – 9 November 2003) was one of the last surviving members of the 1930s Paris surrealist group surrounding André Breton.

Born in the English town of Wendover in 1912 to a family of artists, Onslow Ford began painting at an early age. His grandfather, Edward Onslow Ford, was a Victorian sculptor. At the age of 11, he began painting landscapes under the guidance of his uncle. Following the death of his father at age 14, he was sent to the Royal Naval College at Dartmouth. The ocean affected him deeply and his early works depicted ocean scenes. The metaphor of taking a "voyage" later became an important aspect of his paintings.

== Paris ==
While in the Navy, Onslow Ford visited Paris several times. In 1937, he resigned as a naval officer and moved to Paris to pursue painting full-time. He studied with André L’hote for five weeks and studied with Fernand Léger for a short time. He continued visiting Léger, bringing his work to him often for critique.

Soon he met the Chilean architect Roberto Matta. Matta, who was working with Le Corbusier, was an accomplished draftsman and was making small drawings on the side. Onslow Ford, with his keen sense of seeing, admired Matta's drawings as "the most exciting images" he had seen in Paris. He encouraged Matta to continue with his drawings, which eventually inspired Matta to shift his direction from architecture to painting.

Onslow Ford and Matta became close friends, meeting and traveling frequently. They developed an ongoing dialogue about their ideas on art and metaphysics. They were also inspired by the 1937 exhibit of Mathematical Objects in Paris in which one aspect of the Mathematical Object was visible while another aspect was left to the imagination of the viewer.

In 1938, André Breton invited Onslow Ford to join the surrealist group in Paris and attend their meetings in Café deux Magots. Onslow Ford then became friends with Pierre Mabille, André Breton, Yves Tanguy, Esteban Frances, Wolfgang Paalen, Max Ernst and Victor Brauner among others. His love of painting also led him to collect paintings and frequently visit the studios of Picasso, Miró, de Chirico and André Masson.

In the summer of 1939, Onslow Ford rented a chateau at Chemilleu near the border of Switzerland, and invited several of his friends to stay for a couple of months. Among the friends were André Breton, Jacqueline Lamba, Yves Tanguy, Roberto Matta, Esteban Frances, and Kay Sage. They spent the summer painting, exchanging ideas and reading poetry. They were visited regularly by their friend and neighbor Gertrude Stein.

== New York City ==
At the outset of World War II, the Society for the Preservation of European Culture invited Onslow Ford to join the surrealists in New York. Onslow Ford, one of the few surrealists who was an English speaker, was invited to give a series of lectures at the New School for Social Research and organized four important surrealist shows in 1941. Those lectures and exhibitions are said to have influenced artists such as Jackson Pollock, Robert Motherwell, and others who would go on to create Abstract Expressionism.

== Mexico ==
Onslow Ford met the American writer Jacqueline Johnson at his lectures in New York and they married in 1941. That same year, they moved to Mexico where he had previously visited his surrealist friends Wolfgang Paalen, Remedios Varo and Esteban Frances who were all living there.

For six years (1941–1947) Onslow Ford and Johnson lived in Erongaricuaro, a remote village populated by the Purépecha Indians and located on the shores of Lake Patzcuaro. While living there, they created, studied, and learned the native way of living and participated in some native ceremonies. They stayed in constant connection with Wolfgang Paalen with Johnson assisting Paalen in editing his journal DYN as well as contributing writings for the journal. During their stay they were also visited by many Surrealist friends including Roberto Matta, Wolfgang Paalen, Remedios Varo, Esteban Frances, Eva Sulzer, Alice Rahon, William Fett, Pierre Mabille, Benjamin Péret, and the poet César Moro.

== San Francisco ==
In 1947, Onslow Ford and Johnson moved to California, choosing the San Francisco Bay Area as the fertile soil where their new ideas would have a chance to grow. While in San Francisco, he was invited to give a retrospective show at the San Francisco Museum of Art (1948). The title of the exhibit and the catalogue, Towards a New Subject in Painting, spoke to the fact that he was moving in a new direction in his art.

While living in San Francisco, Onslow Ford met the Greek poet Jean Varda and together they acquired the ferryboat Vallejo, which they docked in Sausalito and converted into their studios. For many years the ferryboat was an inspiring haven for painters and artists and became a small cultural center on the waterfront. In 1951, Onslow Ford with his friends Wolfgang Paalen, Lee Mullican, and Jacqueline Johnson created an exhibition at the San Francisco Museum of Art called Dynaton.

In the early 1950s, Onslow Ford was introduced to Asian philosophy and studied Hinduism with Haridas Chaudhuri and Buddhist scholar Alan Watts at the newly formed Asian Academy (now called the California Institute of Integral Studies) in San Francisco. Around this time he also met the venerable Zen master Hodo Tobase of the Soto Zen sect and began studying Chinese calligraphy (1952–57). This entrance into Asian thought and practice had a profound influence on his paintings. Buddhist teachings of the Void and Emptiness as well as the practice of calligraphy initiated him into an exploration of the depths of the Mind and its images.

== Inverness ==
In 1957, Onslow Ford and Johnson acquired a large body of virgin woodlands in the hills of Inverness, California. Ten years later they gave the majority of the land to the Nature Conservancy for the sake of preserving it. At this time, Onslow Ford began writing and, in 1964, he published his first book entitled Painting in the Instant. Johnson died in 1976 as he was working on his second book, Creation, which was published in 1978. In 1977, he had a major retrospective of his work at the Oakland Museum of California. After this, he assumed a more solitary life, focusing more deeply on his painting.

In 1989, he met Fariba Bogzaran, an artist, lucid dream researcher, and faculty member at John F. Kennedy University. They began a series of dialogues on arts and consciousness. In her research, Bogzaran found a connection between Onslow Ford's paintings, lucid dreaming, and meditation. Onslow Ford collaborated with her on several of his books including Insights (1991), Ecomorphology (1994) and Once Upon a Time (1999).

In 1998, Onslow Ford, Bogzaran, and Robert Anthoine cofounded the nonprofit organization Lucid Art Foundation in order to explore the relationship between art, consciousness, and nature through art exhibitions, publications, and seminars for artists.

== Exhibitions ==
In the 1990s,Onslow Ford has had several retrospectives and solo exhibitions in the United States, Germany, Chile, and Spain. In 1996, he inaugurated the John F. Kennedy University Arts and Consciousness Gallery and M.F.A. program in Berkeley, California, and received an honorary doctorate degree in Fine Arts from the university in 1997. His paintings are in the collections of the Whitney Museum of American Art, the Solomon R. Guggenheim Museum, the Tate Britain, de Young Museum, Oakland Museum of California, San Francisco Museum of Modern Art, and the Los Angeles County Museum of Art. In 2010, Francis M. Naumann Fine Art showed Paintings and Works on Paper: 1939-1951, the first solo show of Onslow Ford's work in New York since 1946.

Onslow Ford died peacefully in his home on 9 November 2003. He was 90. He left his legacy to the Lucid Art Foundation.
