= Wolfgang Paalen =

Austrian-Mexican artist (1905–1959)

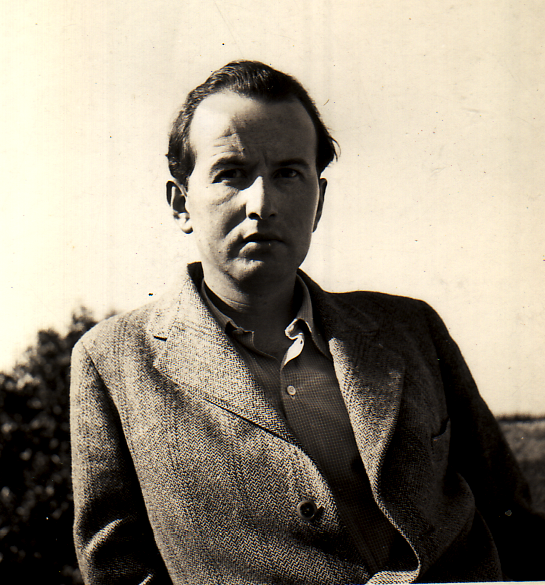
- Paalen, c. 1940
- Born: July 22, 1905; Vienna, Austria
- Died: September 24, 1959 (aged 54); Taxco, Mexico
- Education: Philosophy, art
- Known for: Painting, sculpture, art theory
- Movement: Surrealism, Modernism
- Spouse(s): 1. 1934: Alice Phillipot, later Rahon; 2. 1947: Luchita Hurtado; 3. 1957: Isabel Marín

Wolfgang Robert Paalen (July 22, 1905 in Vienna, Austria – September 24, 1959 in Taxco, Mexico) was an Austrian-Mexican painter, sculptor, and art philosopher. A member of the Abstraction-Création group from 1934 to 1935, he joined the influential Surrealist movement in 1935 and was one of its prominent exponents until 1942. Whilst in exile in Mexico, he founded his own counter-surrealist art-magazine DYN, in which he summarized his critical attitude towards radical subjectivism and Freudo-Marxism in Surrealism with his philosophy of contingency. He rejoined the group between 1951 and 1954, during his sojourn in Paris.

== Family and childhood ==
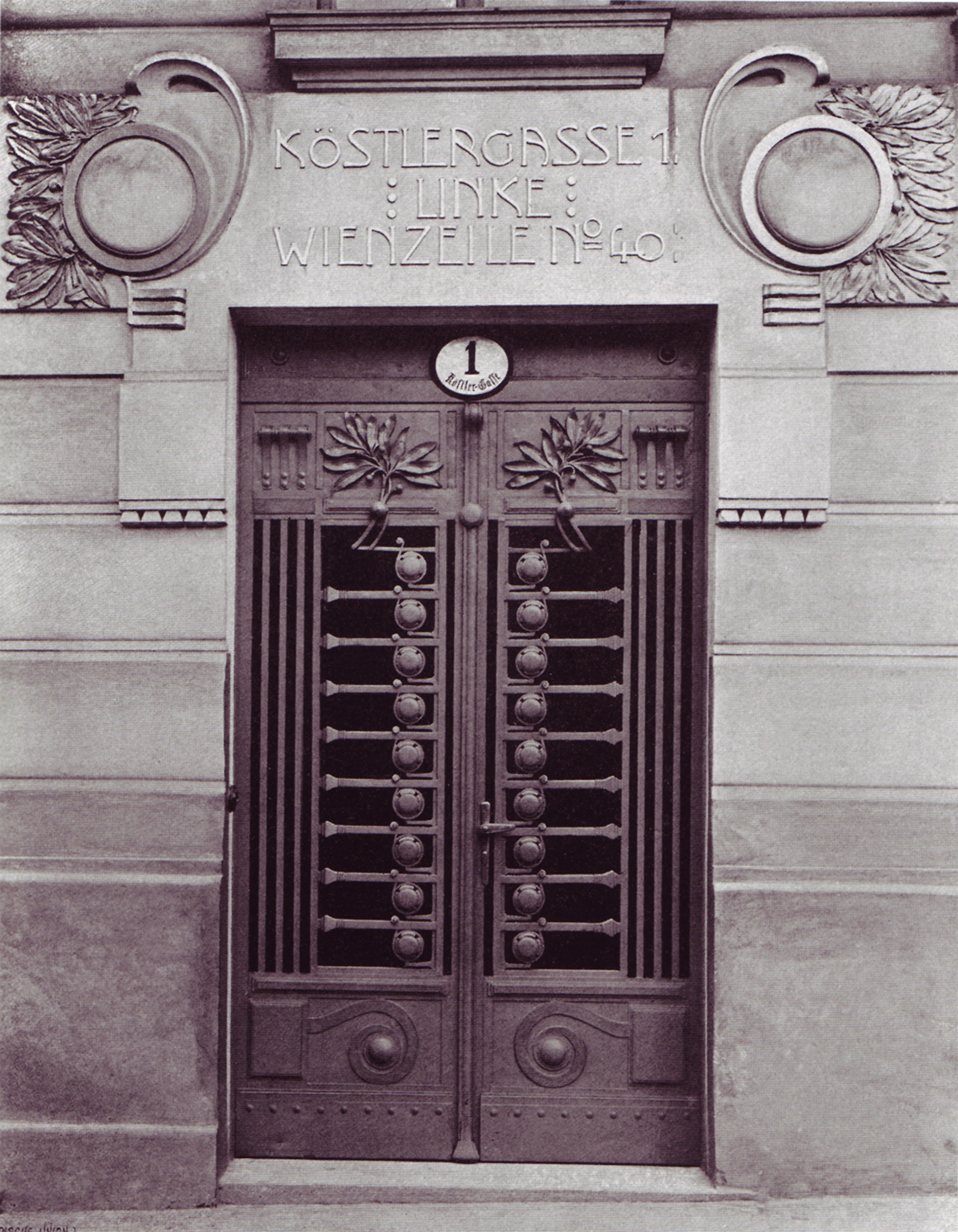
Entrance to Paalen's birthplace, Köstlergasse 1, Vienna

Wolfgang Paalen was born in one of the famous Wienzeilenhäuser designed by Otto Wagner in Vienna (Köstlergasse 1 / Linke Wienzeile No. 40), Austria. He was the first of four sons of the Austrian-Jewish merchant and inventor Gustav Robert Paalen, and his German wife, the actress Clothilde Emilie Gunkel. Gustav Robert, who had Polish-Ashkenazi and Spanish-Sephardic origins, converted to Protestantism in 1900 and changed his name from Pollak to Paalen in the same year. His considerable wealth was based on modernist inventions and patents such as the vacuum cleaner, the vacuum flask, known under the name Thermos bottle, and the first flow-type heater (for Junkers), amongst others. In a relatively short period Gustav R. Paalen managed to ascend into the distinguished Viennese upper-class of the Austro-Hungarian Empire. He became also a well known collector of Old Master paintings with masterpieces, like Francisco Goya's Señora Sabasa Garcia, which he had acquired from the Berlin patron Henri James Simon and is today one of the highlights of the National Gallery, Washington. As a friend of Wilhelm von Bode and member of the Freundeskreis des Kaiser-Friedrich Museums, Berlin, he also financed the acquisition of the famous Titian painting Venus with the Organ-Player.

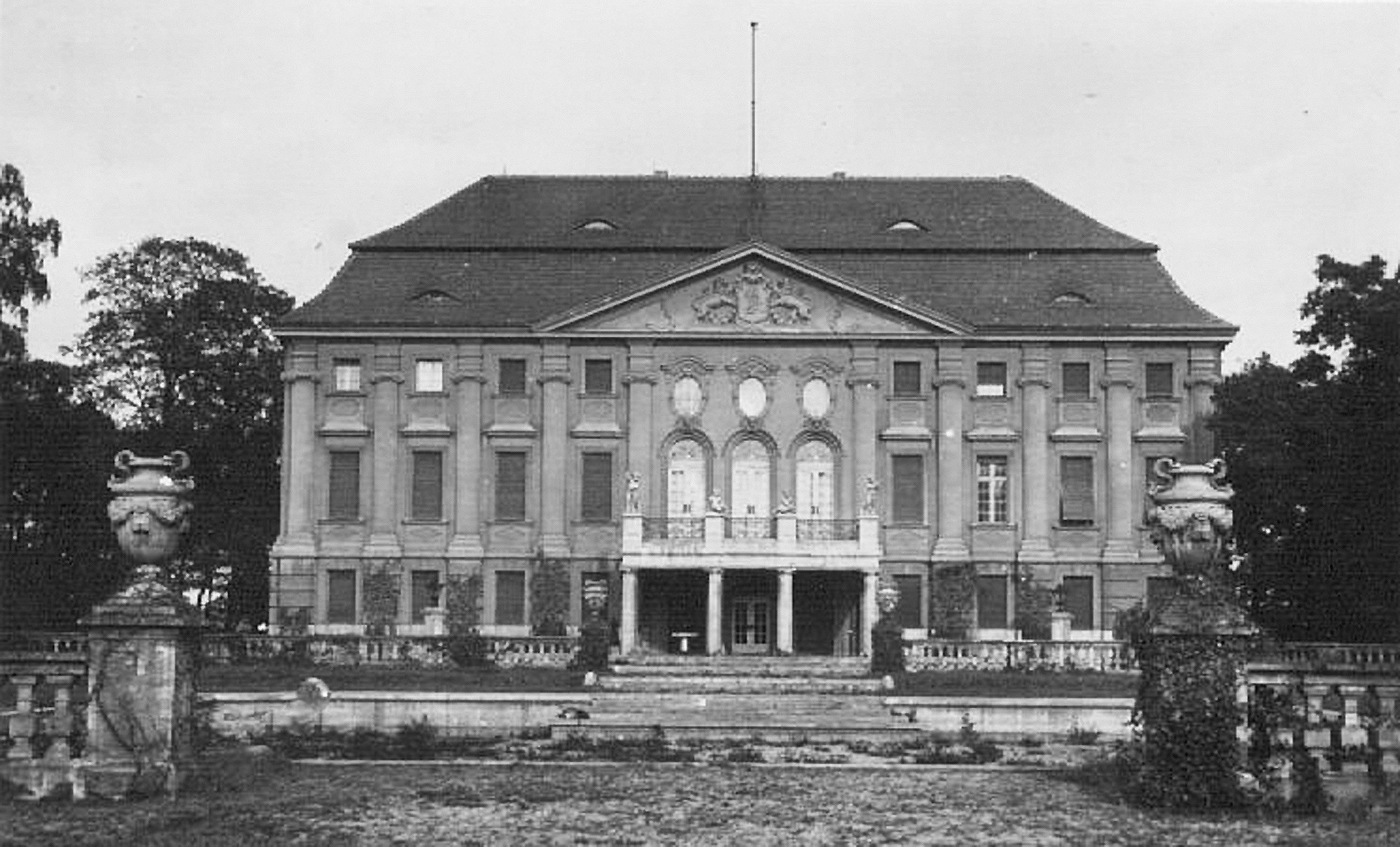
Castle of the Paalen-family in Sagan from 1913 to 1934

The first years of his life Wolfgang Paalen spent between Vienna and Styria where his father had opened the fashionable health resort Tobelbad, in the presence of Franz Joseph I of Austria, to whom he dedicated a memorial still visible today. In Tobelbad Paalen senior received such prominent guests as Gustav Mahler, poet and artist Fritz von Herzmanovsky-Orlando, Julius Meier-Graefe, Ida Zweig (the mother of Stefan Zweig), among others. Some sources claim that it was Paalen who introduced Alma Mahler, during her visit in Tobelbad in 1910, to the German architect Walter Gropius, whom she married later. 1912 the Paalen family moved to Berlin and to the Silesian city of Sagan (today Żagań), where his father had bought and rebuilt the castle of St. Rochusburg. During World War I Gustav Robert served both empires, the Austrian and the German, with the organization of food supply and worked closely together with Walther Rathenau and Albert Ballin's Zentral-Einkaufsgesellschaft. Wolfgang attended different schools in Sagan, and during the war his parents also engaged a private tutor. The teacher was also an organist who specialized in Johann Sebastian Bach, who thus became Wolfgang's favourite composer.

== Early teachers and decline of the family ==
In 1919 the family moved to Rome, where they kept a luxurious household in the Villa Caetani on the Gianicolo and received many guests, such as the German painter Leo von König (1871–1944) who became Wolfgang's first art teacher. It was in Rome, under the guidance of his father's friend, the archeologist Ludwig Pollak, that he became an expert in Greek and Roman archaeology. In 1923 he returned to Berlin alone to apply for the academy. Although unsuccessful, he met his lifelong friend, companion and patron, the Swiss violinist, collector, filmmaker and photographer Eva Sulzer (Winterthur 1902 – 1990 Mexico City). In 1925 he exhibited at the Berlin Secession and studied further in aesthetics, deeply influenced by Julius Meier-Graefe, Nietzsche, Schopenhauer and the Gestalt theory of Max Wertheimer. It is here and with hypnopompic hallucinations in the castle in Sagan that he found the base for his later ideas of a deep entanglement of vision and outer world. After another year of studies, in Paris and Cassis (1925–26), where he met Roland Penrose, Jean Varda (Janco) and Georges Braque, he visited the art school of Hans Hofmann in Munich and, in 1928, Saint-Tropez. He then decided to settle in Paris. The year 1928 marks also the beginning of the decline of the family's splendour, once founded on the patriarchal rules of the Austro-Hungarian monarchy. After a homoerotic affair with a mental healer, his younger brother Hans-Peter died unexpectedly in a Berlin insane asylum, presumably of suicide; the parents consequently separated; their mother's bipolar disposition intensified as a result; the fortune of Gustav Paalen is quashed after the Black Tuesday, 1929. A later tragedy, crucial to Paalen's development, was his beloved brother Rainer's shooting himself in head with a pistol. Wolfgang witnessed the event, although Rainer survived, following treatment in a Berlin hospital and escaped from the city in 1933. He died in a mental hospital in Czechoslovakia in 1942.

== Paris and surrealism ==
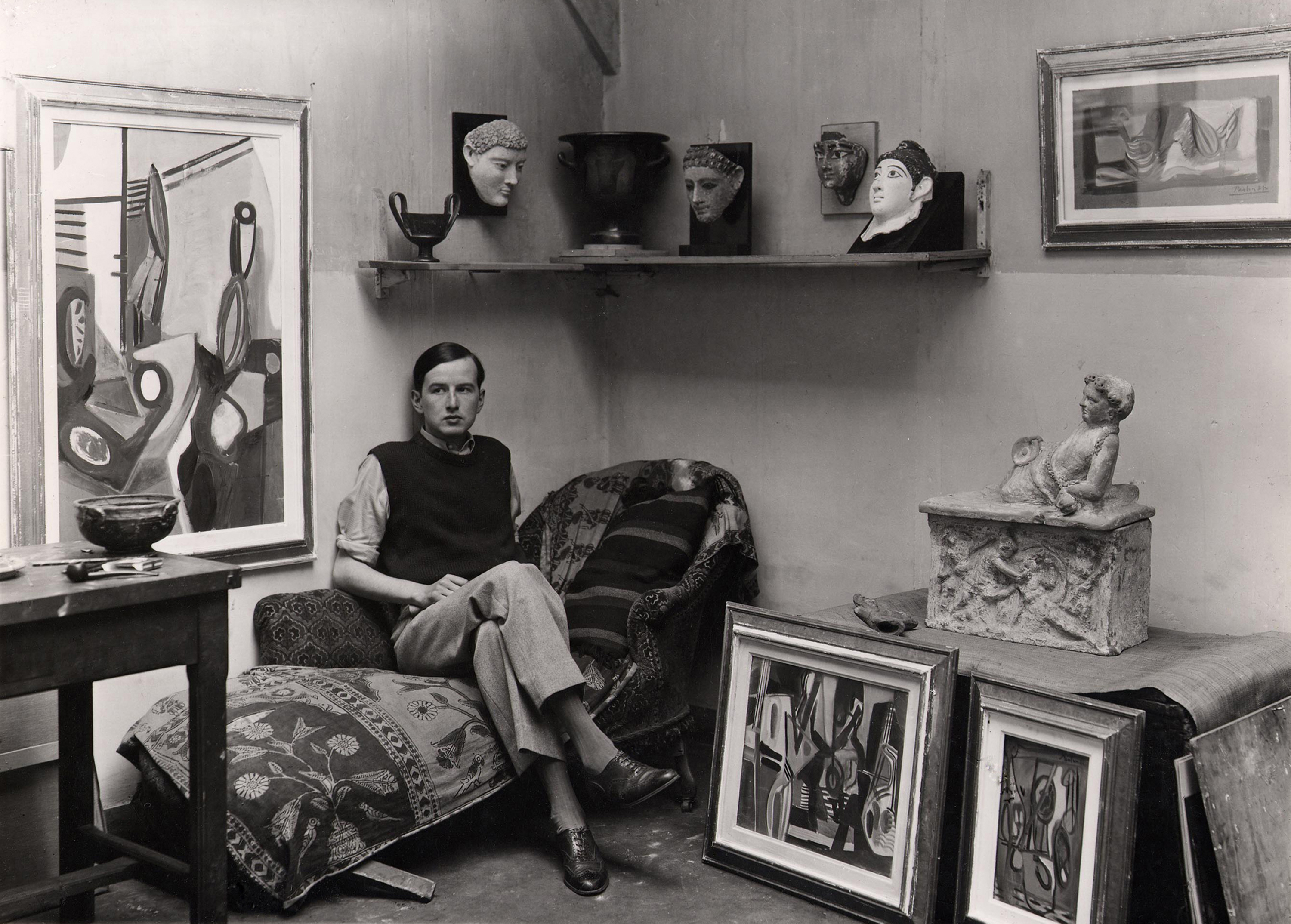
Paalen in his studio apartment, rue Pernety, Paris, about 1933

In Paris he studied for a short time with Fernand Léger and in 1933 became a member of the Abstraction-Création group. He left the group in 1935, together with Hans Arp and Jean Hélion. His work at this time was inspired by Paul Valéry's Eupalinos and tends to macerate and condensate the abstract hardliners with regard to the Surrealists. The pictorial results may be seen as language games: testing the point to which concrete forms may be reduced to latency and the point where they transmit multiple meanings. Paalen anticipated with this research, in a certain sense, the later attempts of such abstractionists as Mark Rothko (Multiforms) and Arshile Gorky and amplified his attempts to visualize his idea of human perception as deeply linked to a cosmic texture of latent or possible contents, with whom every organism is interweaved. In 1934 he married the French poet Alice Phillipot, later known as Alice Rahon and again met frequently with Roland Penrose and his wife Valentine Boué, who brought the Paalens into contact with Paul Éluard. In the summer of 1935 he spent some time at the castle home of Lise Deharme, where he met the Parisian Surrealists and André Breton. An intense friendship developed almost immediately, and Breton involved his new adept in surrealist activities such as the Exposition surréaliste d'objets, which opened at the Galerie Charles Ratton in 1936. Here, Paalen showed L´heure exacte (The Exact Time), a clock with glass eyes and feather hands, which was displayed next to Giacometti's Boule suspendue (Suspended Ball). A small glazed showcase with clay idols called Aux bons soins du navigateur (At the Mercy of the Navigator) was shown, as was Le passage à niveau (The Level Crossing), a wooden root elegantly leaning on a cork wall, along with two other objects made of roots: Le crâne de Voltaire (Voltaire's Skull) and Les cerveaux de Rembrandt (Rembrandt's Brains). That same year Paalen had a solo exhibition of paintings in Paris at the Galerie Pierre, owned by Breton's friend Pierre Loeb. Breton and Penrose included him in the organization of the International Surrealist Exhibition in London, where he presented twelve oils, gouaches and objects as well as his first fumage (Dictated by a Candle) representing a ghostly hand performing the act of painting. The contact with Breton deepened during that time and Paalen also participated in the design of Breton's Galerie Gradiva. There he met and worked with Marcel Duchamp and presented his object Chaise envahie de lierre, acquired in the gallery by Marie-Laure de Noailles, who installed it in her famous bathroom, mentioned and illustrated in Harper's Bazaar in April 1938.

=== Fumage and first masterpieces ===
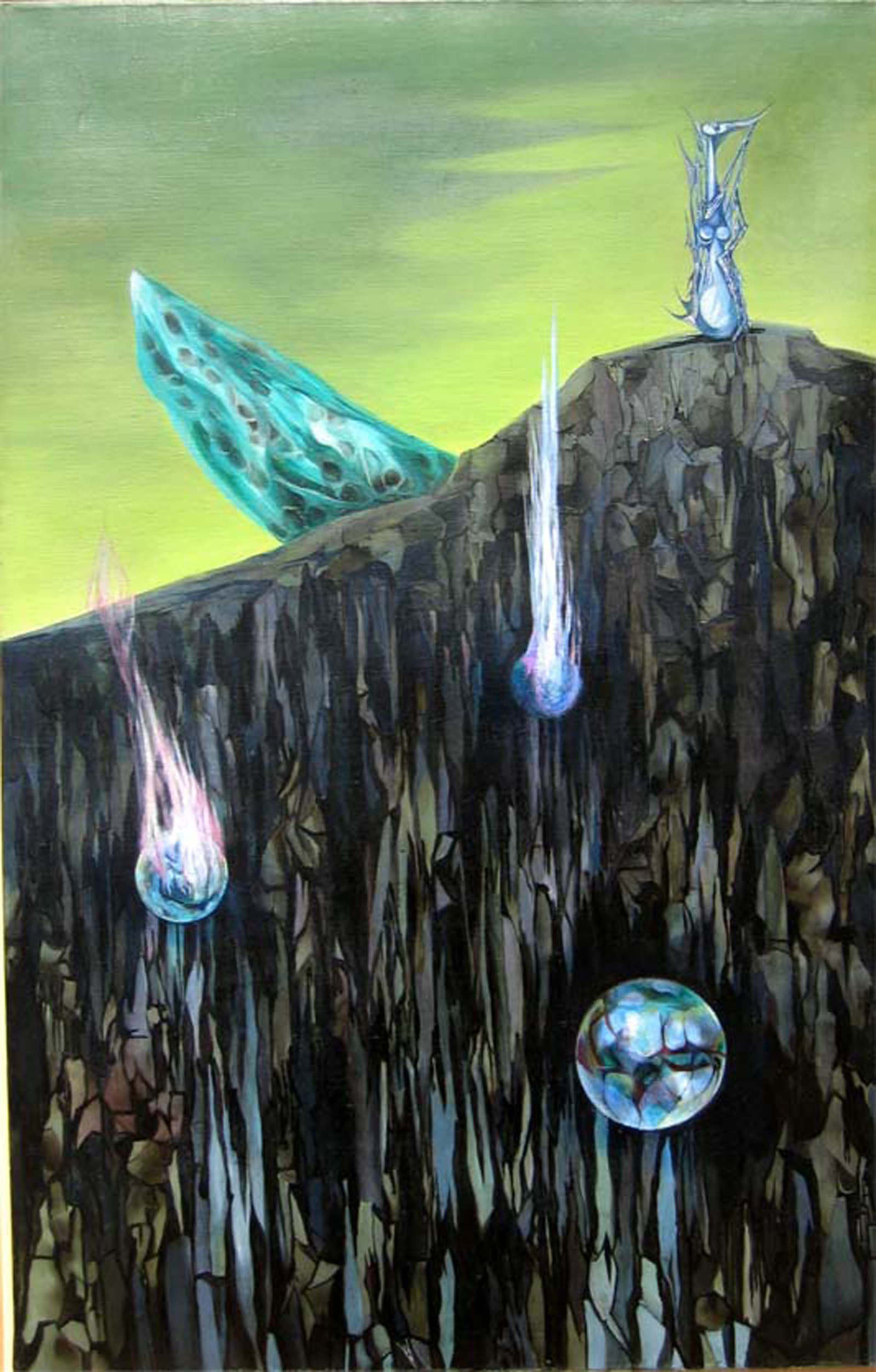
Pays interdit ("Forbidden Land"), 1936-37

In the course of his association with the Surrealists and their attempts to transform automatic writing into drawing and painting, he was an early modern practitioner of fumage – a technique for generating evocative patterns with the smoke and soot of a lit candle, the earliest documented practitioner of which was American clock maker Silas Hoadley. Between 1936 and 1937 Paalen developed with these visionary-ephemeral forms on canvas, which he then mostly painted over in oil, a number of mature paintings which soon made his international reputation.

The further development in the work of Paalen continues to follow up the idea of a biological-evolutionary-physical-cosmological continuum, in which the human organism can evolve and unfold. Prelude for a series of oil-Fumages within the Surrealist group gave the discreet affair of Pablo Picasso with Alice Rahon which had led to an abortion. The deep crisis of the couple and Paalen's first grave attack of depression led to his first important Surrealist masterpiece, Pays interdit ("Forbidden Land"), an apocalyptic landscape dominated by a female goddess and fallen, meteorite-like planets. Paalen had designed his personal model of the permeable poetic soul in the form of a cryptic, abyssal landscape, pervaded by a mixture of feminine mystique and romantic ‘shock’ imagery reminiscent of pre-Celtic faerie mysteries and their cosmic allusions, as these are known in the lyrical tradition of Brittany. This was also the first painting, into which he artfully integrated his fumage, in the extremely fine, crystalline execution of the lower section. In 1937 he realized many paintings in this style, including Fata Alaska.

=== International Exhibition of Surrealism 1938 and surrealist objects ===
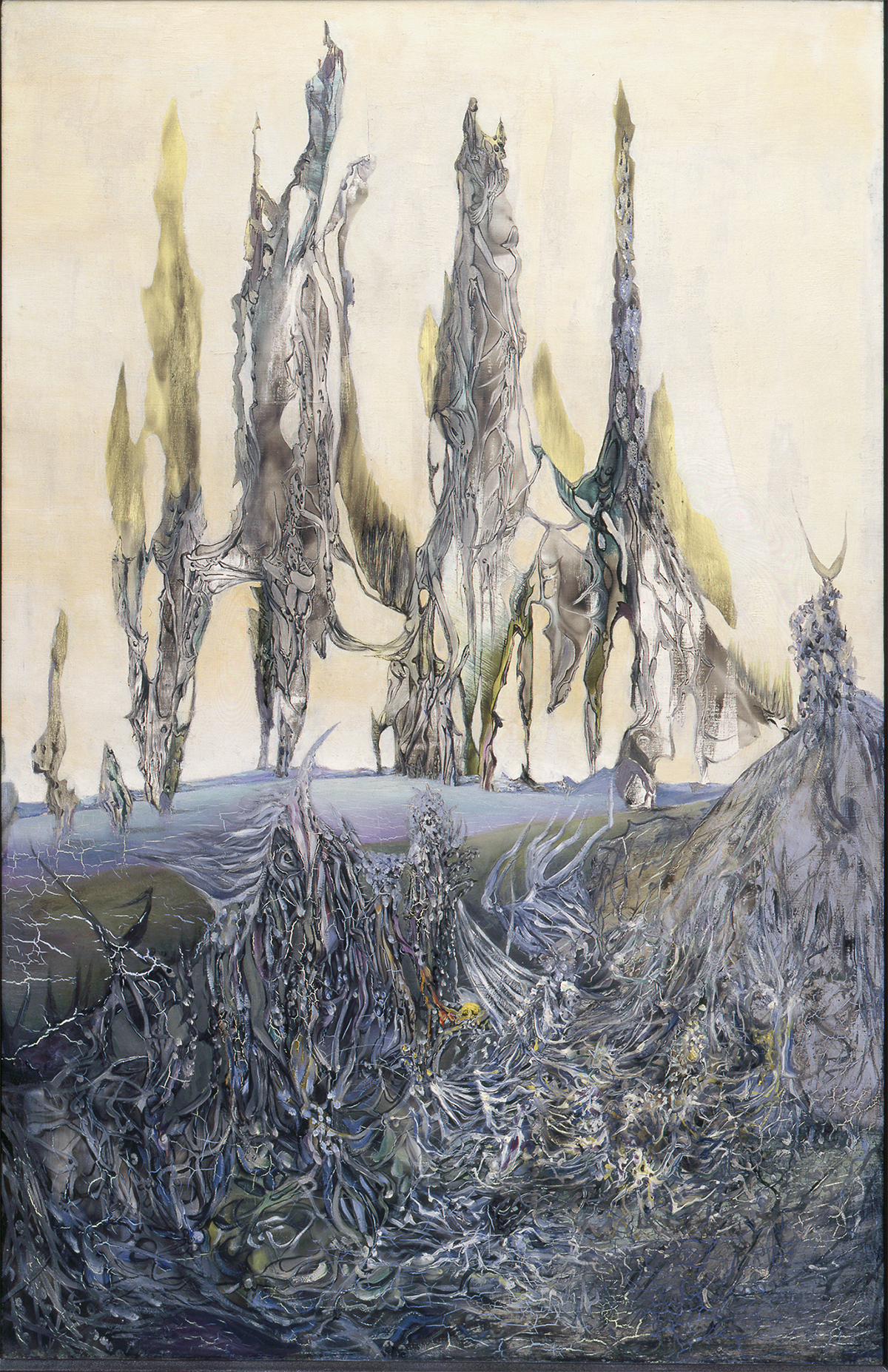
Les étrangers, 1937

Together with Marcel Duchamp, Man Ray and Salvador Dalí, Paalen was among those responsible for the design of the 1938 International Exhibition of Surrealism at the Palais des Beaux Arts in Paris, where he produced a floor, with dead leaves and mud from the Montparnasse Cemetery, and an installation named Avant La Mare, consisting of an artificial pond with water, real water-lilies and reeds, beneath Duchamp's ceiling of empty coal sacks. The doll Paalen decorated came with a silk scarf, a giant bat on her head and an eerie, mushroom-covered leaf-dress. It anticipated the barely visible, floating, gliding totemic fairy creatures from his oil paintings with fumage that Pierre Colle would show the following June in his surrealist gallery. He also participated in the editorial of the catalogue, published as Dictionnaire abrégé du Surrealisme to the show, in which his most famous object, Nuage articulé, was discreetly announced as a drawing. Recent research suggests that Paalen had a huge influence on the design of the exhibition's Great Hall. Other critics suggest that the entire installation was meant to imply the minatorial situation of the Surrealist group itself, reflected by the approaching war, as well as a huge mother's womb as vade mecum to fight the causes of the crisis, which were located in the paternalistic fixations of the whole epoch. Paalen's biographer Andreas Neufert, in particular, suggests the latter reading and sees the installation as a symptom of an ideological shift within Surrealism, away from Freud's rigid theory of the Oedipus complex to ideas centred on Otto Rank's theory The Trauma of Birth, with its recognition of the emotional nature of the child and its ties to the mother. This latter theory was represented and defended exclusively by Paalen and his wife Alice Rahon in this period.

The erotic connotations of Nuage articulé, with its umbrella covered with natural sponges, embodied a dynamic sense of contradiction: bloom with stalk; sponge as symbol of nature, as a feminine utensil, which touched and cleaned naked female skin; umbrella as a masculine symbol of order and protection from natural forces. It thus became widely recognized among the Surrealists and their growing public. Geo Dupin, Paalen's sister-in-law, remembered that Alfred H. Barr, Jr. had been extremely taken with Paalen's object and had chosen not to buy it, for the Museum of Modern Art in New York City, only because it was too fragile and difficult to transport. Nuage articulé was published later in a more political context in the Surrealist magazine London Bulletin, together with a text by André Breton translated by Samuel Beckett with a comment that the sponge-umbrella would bring to mind another, sadly prominent, umbrella – that of Neville Chamberlain at the 1938 Munich Conference and the failure of the British policy of appeasement. Besides Nuage articulé, of which two versions are known and preserved In addition to Nuage articulé, Paalen presented other objects in the 1938 surrealist exhibition, such as: Potence avec paratonnerre (Gallows with Lightning Rod), a larger-than-life wooden gibbet with lightning rods and a dedication plaque to the German philosopher and experimental physicist Georg Christoph Lichtenberg; Le moi et le soi (The Ego and the Id); and a version of Chaise envahie de lierre. Perhaps inspired by the revolving doors used as movable walls for paintings and metaphorically called portes ‘revolver’ in the surrealist exhibition, Paalen designed a pistol shape from different small animal bones, which he fastened to a box with a tray and glass lid lined with black velvet. As in museum displays of valuable paleontological discoveries, he included its title on a copper plate inscribed ‘Le génie de l'espèce’ (The Genius, or Engineering, of the Species).

=== The paintings of 1938–39 and plans for Mexico ===
1938 he showed his new fumage paintings, which made his reputation as painter, in a show in Renou et Colle Gallery in Paris, with a catalogue text by Breton, written in Bermuda on his trip to Mexico. He published also the Lichtenberg-text Göttinger Taschenalmanach in surrealist magazine Minotaure with illustrations by him. In 1938 the Paalens socialised with Frida Kahlo during her visit in Paris. She invited the couple to Mexico, where Paalen wanted to organize a Surrealist exhibition together with Breton. It was Marcel Duchamp who recommended Paalen to Peggy Guggenheim and the New York dealer Julien Levy. "Dear Julien, P. S. to my recent letter: Do you know Paalen's work? I suppose that you have seen some reproductions. Among the young Surr[ealists]'s he ought to come out – he paints scenes "for" a sorcerer (you never see the witches). All this to hope that you might show him in N.Y", Duchamp had already written to Levy in January 1939; in March he added a note about the invitation to the Guggenheim show: “In London with Mary [Reynolds] for a few days – Just came to see the last day of Paalen's show – His "sorcelleries" look real on the walls – Hope you try them in N.Y." After his one-man-show at the Guggenheim Jeune Gallery in Cork Street, London, as the first of the surrealists, he decided to leave Europe and travelled first to New York in May 1939 together with his wife Alice and friend Eva Sulzer. The same year he traveled through British Columbia where he collected a major totem house-screen with the representation of a bear-woman, accessible through a hole in the womb (now in the Denver Art Museum). His literary text Paysage totémique, later published in his magazine DYN, originates from the travel-notebooks, films and photographs of this voyage. In September he arrived in Mexico, where Diego Rivera and Frida Kahlo accompanied him to a house in Coyoacán, next to Kahlo's Casa Azul (The Blue House), which they had rented for him.

=== The first years of exile in Mexico ===
In autumn 1939 he organized the International Surrealist Exhibition in the Galería de Arte Mexicano together with the Peruvian poet César Moro, which opened in January 1940 in the new gallery rooms of Ines Amor. In April 1940 he showed his great Fumages and new experimental work, close to abstraction, in New York at Julien Levy gallery with great success. Reporters witness that Paalen at a certain point switched out the light and walked around with a burning candle during the opening, gathered by young American painters such as Jackson Pollock, Adolph Gottlieb, Robert Motherwell, William Baziotes and Gerome Kamrowski. Neither in Mexico, nor in New York he came in contact to Leon Trotsky or his assistant Jean van Heijenoort (who then was living in New York), albeit the commendatory letter, Breton had written already in Paris, hoping that Paalen would continue the contact, he had established during his trip to Mexico in 1938. Paalen justified his refusal in a letter to Breton with his general critique on the pseudo-religious paternal fixations of the Surrealists who, in his opinion, didn't dispose of the means to find other ways out of the spiritual hole, the crisis of Marxism has left in their minds, than to look for new political fathers. Back in Mexico he broke up with his former friends Diego Rivera and Frida Kahlo across political opinions concerning their hard line in communism after the assassination of Leon Trotsky and their return to an open adoration of Joseph Stalin. More and more isolated from the Mexican intellectual leftists, he held an open household for European and American visitors, such as Roberto Matta, Robert Motherwell, Gordon Onslow Ford, Benjamin Péret, Remedios Varo, Esteban Francés as well as refugees from the stalinist terror, like Gustav Regler and Victor Serge. He helped to organize immigration visas for the surrealists in Vichy-France through the Union Mexico-Francia and Julien Levy. During his first period of exile, Paalen concentrated on the verbalization of his ideas on art and, apart from occasional visits to New York, experimented secretly, in his studio in San Ángel, in a new style on pictorial space.

== The war years ==
=== DYN ===
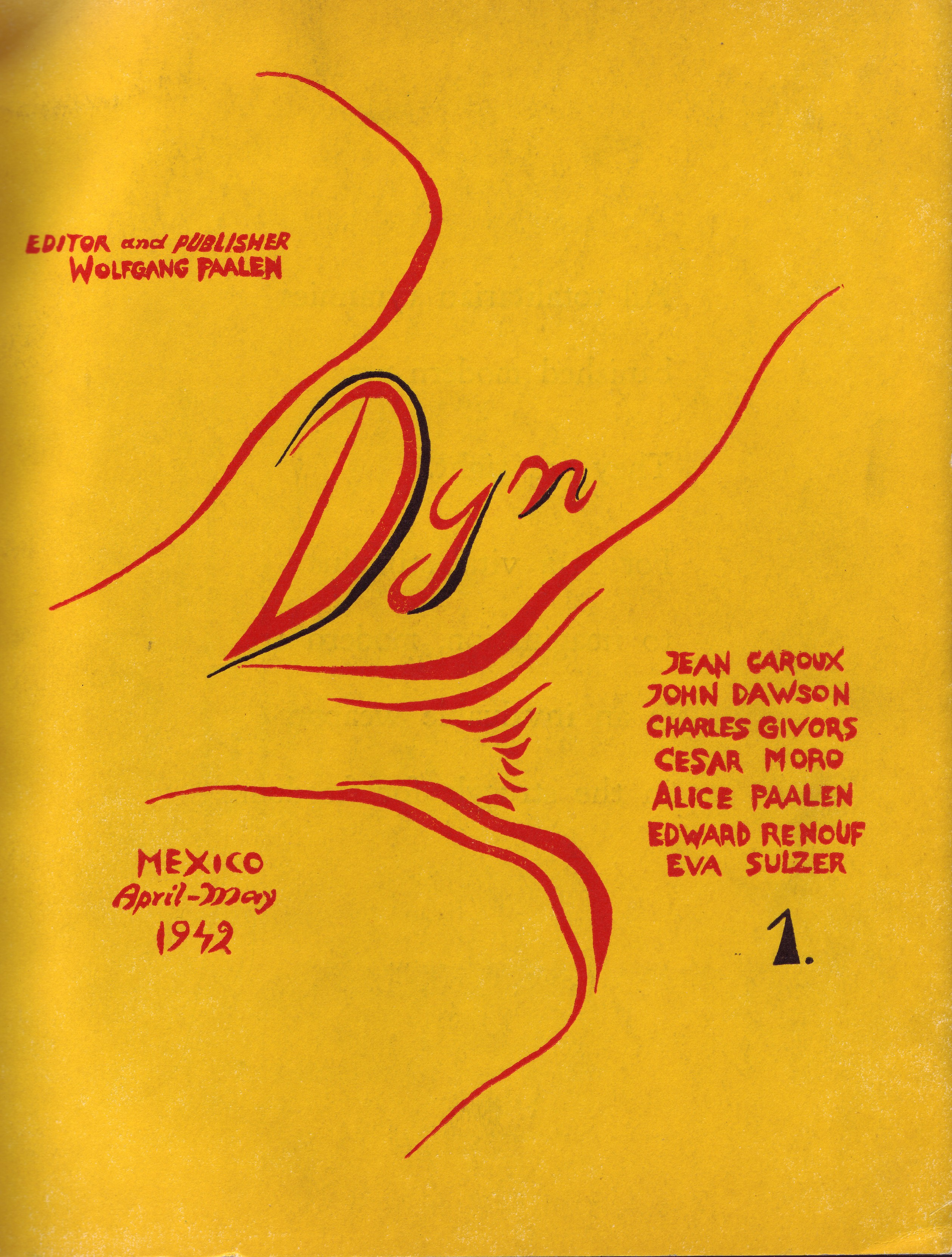
First issue of the magazine, Mexico, 1942

In the spring of 1942 the New York art world witnessed the result of Paalen's intense work in the first years of exile in Mexico – the art journal DYN (derived from the Greek κατὰ τὸ δυνατόν – "that which is possible"). In its first issue he publicly announced to his friend Breton his Farewell to Surrealism. In the second issue he scandalised his former advocate again by publishing a survey on Dialectical Materialism and an article with the provocative title The dialectical Gospel, which caused a scandal among the New York Surrealists. The art historian Meyer Schapiro then organized a symposium on dialectical materialism, with the Surrealists in Breton's apartment in New York, which revealed nothing but the inadequate knowledge of the artists on this field. In DYN Paalen theoretically hedged his concept of possibility on various levels, with quantum theory, with his own concept of totemism, gestalt theory, with his criticisms of dialectical materialism and western dualistic concepts, with his analysis of cave painting, and so on. By means of his journal, with a total of five issues published in Mexico between 1942 and 1944, he temporarily advanced to be one of the most influential art theorists in the wartime period. Even Breton admitted in 1944 that Paalen's criticism of Surrealism was justified and that "we (the Surrealists) have left the whole licence to Paalen, who could say whatever he liked, without having the means to say something against or at least put something at his level. Paalen is winning on the whole line."

In seven large essays and countless smaller articles and reviews he discussed in detail the topical concerns of the young New York artists and, in response, received their full attention. Also his long article Totem Art had considerable influence on such artists, as Martha Graham, Isamu Noguchi, Jackson Pollock, Mark Rothko and Barnett Newman, mainly because of the new conception of considering totemistic art as part of ecstatic action and ritual with its psychic links to generic memory and matrilinear ancestor-worship. With the exception of Totem Art, all essays are republished under the title Form and Sense by Robert Motherwell in New York as the first issue of the series of writings titled Problems of Contemporary Art in which also the first papers of the later Abstract Expressionists, like Possibilities, were published. Paalen's short sojourns in New York and the two solo exhibitions made him known as a painter in artist's circles, however his predominant absence from the New York art scene and the wide reception of DYN and Form and Sense fostered his image as a kind of intellectual secret agent primarily exerting indirect influence on the events through his intensely discussed ideas.

In a note with the title America has a new art movement (the first authentic art movement here) Barnett Newman listed Paalen together with Pollock, Rothko, Hoffman, Gorky, Baziotes and Motherwell as "The men in the new art movement"; Motherwell appears with a question mark, while Paalen is listed twice, once with the adding "New" (probably dividing Paalen's surrealist from his DYN-works).

The German art historian Andreas Neufert, who has extensively explored Paalen's life and work, suggested in his 2015 biography on the artist, that DYN and the New York surrealist journal VVV were widely inspired by each other and can be seen partly as a hidden correspondence between Breton and Paalen. This assumption has been already denoted (but not fully explored) by Yve-Alain Bois in 2004 in his contribution "1942a – The depoliticization of the American avant-garde..."

=== The new concept of space in painting ===
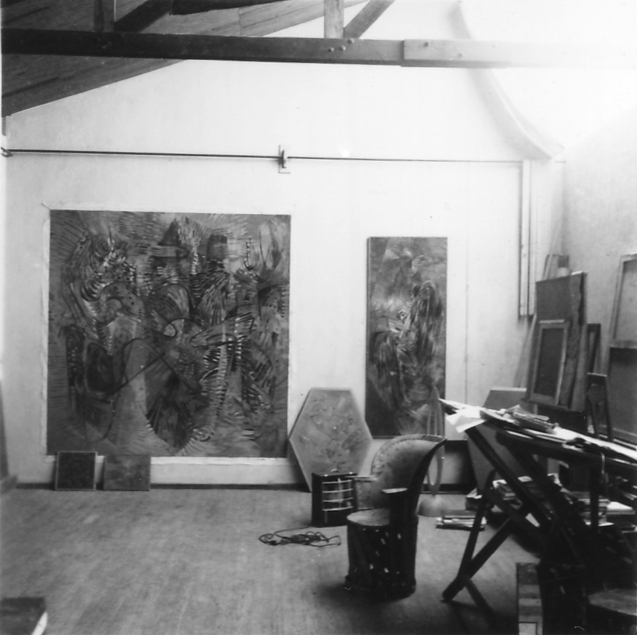
Interior of Paalen's studio in San Ángel, with his painting Les Cosmogones

It was in the 1940s that Paalen's art particularly played a major role in changing the conception of abstract art. Due to his magazine DYN, his presence and exhibitions in New York City, 1940 Julien Levy, 1945 Peggy Guggenheim's The Art of This Century gallery and 1946 Galerie Nierendorf in Berlin, he influenced significantly the genesis of Abstract Expressionism. Paintings such as Les premiers spaciales of 1941 set entirely on the new pictorial space because they concentrate on pictorially immanent means: Rhythm, light and colour. Important is that they transform the rhythmical appearance of the fumage imprints into a neo-cubist rhythm, which Paalen then compares with the fugue and jazz, through a mosaic-like fracture and complementary contrasts. He wants to create the atmosphere of a deeply moving, gripping encounter with beings that themselves remain silent. There is no action, no metamorphosis in them and nothing happens with them in the space. The picture itself is the being, or a frozen resonance of it. Precisely because of this total silence, every topical expectation put to them is reflected as a question. In a cartoon published by Ad Reinhardt in the fifties, Paalen's suggestion from Form and Sense is repeated: "Paintings no longer represent; it is no longer the task of art to answer naive questions. Today it has become the role of the painting to look at the spectator and ask him: what do you represent?" Gustav Regler wrote 1946 about this groundbreaking idea:

There is no greater fear of the numerous escapists of our time than that before the mirror. An amazing, breathtaking idea: to have a portrait asking the original what it is worth, how it lives up to what the painter saw. The old symbol of Dorian Gray. Paalen renewed it in his way. He doubts whether anybody today even knows what he represents. He dares to pretend that someone can grow by the painter. He has the same hope as Pygmalion, to fall in love with his creation and to be outgrown by it. He waits for the picture to renounce allegiance to its creator. He paints his portrait without human features.

Paalen understood his picture beings as a kind of pictorial version of the ancient choros tragicos, the tragic chorus effect, conceived in Nietzsche's writing on The Birth of Tragedy. It is the deep existential foundation of reality, what he is interested in. Although it becomes common practice after 1947, until this time, nobody had placed so much responsibility on the viewer as Paalen did with his rhetoric and pictorial language.

== After the war ==
=== Archeological passions ===
1946 he divorced Alice and married the Venezuelan designer and artist Luchita Hurtado, whom he had met in New York through his friend Isamu Noguchi. Hurtado moved to Mexico in 1947 to live with Paalen and together they explored the ancient culture of the Olmec, about which Paalen later published a widely respected article in the French art magazine Cahiers d'art. Paalen radicalizes the assumption of his friend and colleague Miguel Covarrubias, that the Olmecs were a culture succumbed and (after hundreds of war-years) finally wiped out by the aggressive Maya civilization, comparing the Olmecs to the ancient European matrilinear civilizations, which underlay invasive and more aggressive patriarchal civilizations some 3000 years ago. Paalen's thesis about the matrilinear social-structure of the ancient societies of Mesoamerica, which he documented with considerable support from his own research, was never substantially challenged and strongly influenced such artists as Alice Rahon, Remedios Varo and Leonora Carrington in their archaist and feminist themes. His ideas still live on in the archaeological and artistic discourses, the most prominent popular example of recent times being Mel Gibson's cinematic opus Apocalypto).

=== San Francisco, Paris ===
In 1948, one of the two children from Luchita's former marriage died in Mexico of Polio. Paalen decided to move to San Francisco with his new family, where he worked with Gordon Onslow Ford and Lee Mullican in a newly formed association, the Dynaton group. They settled in Mill Valley and had solo shows in the San Francisco Museum of Art as well as a group show at Stanford University Art Gallery, where he also lectured parts from the major essay on his new concept of space, he had worked on the last years. It was published in occasion of the DYNATON exhibition in San Francisco Museum of Art in 1951 as a catalogue. Paalen's ongoing desire to go back to Mexico and rebuilt the link to Breton in Paris led to a divorce from Luchita, who decided to live with Lee Mullican.

Back in Mexico Paalen organized 1951 a longer stay in Paris. Together with his new fiancée, the American painter Marie Wilson, Paalen lived for the next 3 years in Kurt Seligmann's atelier-building in the Impasse Villa Seurat in Paris, built by André Lurçat. He reconciled with Breton, spent most of the summers in Breton's house in Saint Cirq La Popie, participated at the invention of various surrealist games, like Ouvrez-Vous? and L’un dans l’autre and painted a considerable corpus of lyrical-abstract paintings, which were exhibited at Galerie Pierre (1953) and Galerie Galanis-Hentschel (1954). One of the four numbers of Breton's magazine Medium – Communication Surréaliste is dedicated to Paalen. After travelling through Germany in the summer of 1954 he went back again to Mexico.

=== Last years in Mexico and suicide ===
Paalen's last years in Mexico were characterized by increasing health problems, mainly originated in his bipolar (manic-depressive) disposition. With the help of his friends and patrons Eva Sulzer and Gordon Onslow Ford he acquired an old house with studio in the small town Tepoztlán in Morelos, where he mainly lived and worked during the last years of his life. Paradoxically Paalen produced a number of masterly works towards the end of this last period, as well as theatre plays and short stories, which reflect his ambivalent state of mind and growing depressions. His passion for Olmec sculpture and artefacts implicated him into adventurous expeditions into the wilderness of Yucatán, collecting and trading pre-Columbian art to an always growing US market. Rumours of Paalen having been involved in illegal looting of archaeological sites in Yucatán inspired the American author and theologian Arthur A. Cohen to write his novel Acts of Theft (1980). As expert and inspirator Wolfgang Paalen assisted the American filmmaker Albert Lewin for his film The Living Idol. 1958 he received André Pieyre de Mandiargues and Octavio Paz in Tepoztlán, who both wrote texts on Paalen after his suicide. In the night of September 25, 1959, Paalen left his hotel room in the Hacienda San Francisco Cuadra in Taxco, where he sometimes stayed during his depressions, and walked up the hill. The following day he was found dead with a gunshot to his head.

== Poet and writer ==
Although Paalen is known chiefly as a visual artist, he also wrote poetry in French and German, which he shared with Valentine Penrose, Alice Rahon, André Breton and Paul Éluard. 1941 Breton reacted euphorically to Paalen's poetical diary of his voyage to British Columbia in the summer of 1939: "I have read Paysage totémique, re-read, read in a loud voice, nothing is more adorable, indubitably genial". Paysage totémique was partly published in his magazine DYN. He also wrote three theatre plays and various unpublished stories, such as Der Axolotl, Paloma Palomita; his play The Beam of the Balance, a tragic-comedy, reflects the unbroken power of Stalin's totalitarian terror-regime, the release of the atomic bombs in Hiroshima and Nagasaki in 1945 and the danger of the unbalanced scientific human mind in general. It was first read publicly in the house of Robert Motherwell in East Hampton in 1946. His play Elorn, A Ballad from Brittany reflects his lifelong passion with pre-Celtic matrilinear cultures.

== Legacy ==
The complete works of Paalen, canvases, objects and sculptures, were catalogued by art historian Andreas Neufert in his 1999 book Wolfgang Paalen: Im Inneren des Wals: Monography, and Catalogue Raisonné. Paalen's estate in Mexico, including papers and photographs, was donated by the heirs of Isabel Marin de Paalen to the Franz Mayer Museum in Mexico City. The estate which Paalen left in the care of his close friend, the surrealist painter Gordon Onslow Ford, is administrated by the Lucid Art Foundation in Inverness, California, which recently restituted Paalen's rich archive of papers, photographs and manuscripts to the heirs of Eva Sulzer, Paalen's only heir and executor.

Between May and July 2007 a collection of his work was exhibited at the Frey Norris gallery in San Francisco. In 2014 the Wendi Norris Gallery, also in San Francisco, exhibited major works in the solo-retrospective Wolfgang Paalen, Philosopher of the Possible.

Paalen's collected essays on art from DYN, Form and Sense, were re-published in 2013 by Deborah Rosenthal with a foreword by Martica Sawin.

2019 the Belvedere, Vienna honored Wolfgang Paalen with a retrospective exhibition, curated by Andreas Neufert and Franz Smola, which opened October 3 and ran through January 19th with remarkable success. An English edition of the catalogue is available through Koenig Books.

The biography of Wolfgang Paalen, published 2015 in German under the title Auf Liebe und Tod is currently published in two volumes in English. The first volume has been available since November 2022 under the title Paalen Life and Work, I. Forbidden Land: The Early and Crucial Years 1905- 1939.

== Art market ==
Paalen's relatively small oeuvre of roughly 300 canvases, a few objects and some sculptures was mostly traded privately and through specialized galleries in the past. Only minor works appear from time to time in public auctions, as most of the major works are in museums or well-established private collections. In 2009 however, Christie's auctioned Paalen's important 1938 surrealist fumage painting Paysage (Pays) médusé (oil and smoke on canvas). Estimated at €30–40,000, the realised price was €373,000 (ca US$561,000), setting a new record for the highest price paid at auction for this artist. In November 2015 Wolfgang Paalen's painting Les Cosmogones sold for 382.000.- US$ in the Latin American Art auction at Sotheby's New York's. In July 2020 the German auction house Villa Grisebach in Berlin sold Wolfgang Paalen's early programmatic painting Avertissement I (Peinture), 1935 for €387.500.-, setting a new world record price for this artist. In February 2023, two paintings by Paalen from the Surrealist period set new world records for the artist in the traditional auction Art of the Surreal at Christies London: Taches solaires (1938) with a result of 756,000 pounds sterling and Pays interdit (1936–37) with a result of £504,000.

== Artworks ==
- Personnages dans une grotte, 1933
- Hommes possibles 1934
- Avertissement 1935
- L´heure exacte object, 1936
- Pays interdit 1936–37
- Rencontre sur une plage, 1936
- L'Homme possible, 1936
- Toison d'or, 1937
- La Balance, 1937
- Le Débarcadère, 1937
- Paysage totémique de mon enfance, 1937
- Nuage articulé I, objet, 1937
- Paysage totémique, 1937
- Fata Alaska, 1937
- Les Étrangers, 1937
- La Housse Mannequin 1938
- Autophage, 1938
- Orages magnétiques, 1938
- Combat des princes saturniens I and II, 1938
- Vol de moustiques, 1938
- Paysage médusé, 1938
- Les Guetteurs, 1938
- Ciel de pieuvre, 1938
- Taches solaires, 1938
- Plumages, 1938
- Le genie de l´espèce (object, 1938)
- Combats des princes saturniens, III, 1939
- Nuage articulé II (object, 1940)
- Polarités chromatiques, 1940
- Espace sans limite, 1941
- Les premieres spaciales triptych, 1941–44
- Les Cosmogonies, 1943
- La Tempête, 1945
- Gyra, 1945
- L'Or du temps, 1945
- Selam Trilogy, 1947
- Hamnur Trilogy, 1947
- Nuit tropicale, 1947
- Ancêtres à venir, 1949
- Messagers, 1949
- Fête mexicaine, 1949
- Le Messager des trois Pôles, 1949
- La Clé de Duchamp, Hommage à Marcel Duchamp, 1950
- L'enclume, 1952
- Sur les hauts plateaux, 1952
- Lumière fossile, 1953
- Le Scarabée d'or, 1953
- Béatrice perdue, 1953
- Banistas (1958)
- Asi es la vida, 1958
- Isla Mujeres, 1958
- Matutine, 1959

== Essays in DYN ==
=== In English ===
- The New Image, No. 1, April–May 1942
- Suggestion for an Objective Morality, in: Dyn, n° 1, April–May 1942
- Seeing and Showing, in: Dyn, n° 1, April–May 1942
- Surprise and Inspiration, in: Dyn, n° 1, April–May 1942
- About the Origins of the Doric Column and the Guitar-woman, in: Dyn, n° 2, July–August 1942
- The Dialectical Gospel, in: Dyn, n° 2, July–August 1942
- Art and Science, in: Dyn, n° 3, autumn 1942
- Book-Reviews
- Totem Art, in: Dyn, n° 4–5, 1943
- Birth of Fire, in: Dyn, n° 4–5, 1943
- On the Meaning of Cubism Today, in: Dyn, n° 6, November 1944

=== In French ===
- Farewell au surréalisme, No. 1, April–May 1942
- L'Image nouvelle, in: Dyn, n° 1, April–May 1942
- Aperçu pour une morale objective, in: Dyn, n° 1, April–May 1942
- Paysage totémique (3 articles), in: Dyn, n° 1, April–May 1942, n° 2, July–August 1942, n° 3, autumn 1942
- Surprise et inspiration, in: Dyn, n° 2, July–August 1942
- L'Évangile dialectique, in: DYN, n° 3, autumn 1942
- Le Grand Malentendu (trad. of Art and Science), in: DYN, n° 3, autumn 1942
- Rencontre totémique in: DYN, n° 4–5, 1943
- Actualité du cubisme, in: Dyn, n° 6, November 1944
- Pendant l'éclipse, interview of Paalen with Carter Stone, in: Dyn, n° 6, November 1944

== Literature ==
=== Selected biographies ===
- Andreas Neufert (2014), Auf Liebe und Tod, Das Leben des Surrealisten Wolfgang Paalen (Biography), Berlin: Parthas Verlag, ISBN 978-3869640839. (In German)
- Gustav Regler (1946), Wolfgang Paalen, New York: Nierendorf.
- Andreas Neufert (1999), Wolfgang Paalen, Im Inneren des Wals, Wien-New York: Springer, (Monography and Catalogue raisonné), ISBN 3-211-83304-8 (In German)
- Amy Winter (2002), Wolfgang Paalen. Artist and Theorist of the Avantgarde, Westport, Connecticut: Praeger.
- Andreas Neufert: PAALEN. Life and Work, I. Forbidden Land: The Early and Crucial Years 1905 - 1939. Hamburg/Berlin 2022, ISBN 978-3756858873 (hardcover, in English), ISBN 978-3756820061 (softcover, in English), ISBN 9783756826711 (e-book, in English)

=== Selected exhibitions and catalogues ===
- Wolfgang Paalen, Paris (Galerie Renou et Colle) 1938 (Vorwort André Breton)
- Wolfgang Paalen, London (Galerie Guggenheim Jeune) 1939
- Surrealismo, Galería de Arte Mexicano, Mexico City 1940
- Wolfgang Paalen, New York (Galerie Art of this Century) 1945
- Dynaton A New Vision, San Francisco Museum of Art, San Francisco 1951
- Domaine de Paalen, Paris (Galerie Galanis-Hentschel) 1954
- Hommage à Wolfgang Paalen, Museo de Arte Moderno, Mexico-City 1967
- Presencia Viva de Wolfgang Paalen, Museo de Arte Contemporaneo Carrillo Gil, Mexico-City 1979
- Dynaton: Before and Beyond, Frederick R. Weisman Museum of Art, Malibu (Pepperdine University) 1992
- Wolfgang Paalen, Zwischen Surrealismus und Abstraktion, Museum Moderner Kunst Wien (Ritter) 1993
- Wolfgang Paalen, Retrospectiva, Museo de Arte Contemporaneo Carrillo Gil, Mexico-City (Imprenta Madero) 1994

=== Reprint of DYN ===
- Kloyber, Christian, ed. Wolfgang Paalen's DYN: The Complete Reprint Editor's Note by Christian Kloyber; Introductory essays by Lourdes Andrade, Guy Buchholtzer, Gordon Onslow Ford, André Breton, Octavio Paz (Vienna and New York: Springer, 2000)
