= Codex Azoyú =

Two Mesoamerican pictorial codices

The Codices Azoyú I & II are two Mesoamerican pictorial codices, painted in Tlapa around 1565. They were accidentally discovered in 1940 in the town of Azoyú, after which they are named. Both codices depict and offer supporting evidence for the Mesoamerican belief of nahualism.

== Content ==
=== Codex Azoyú I ===
The larger of the two codices, where the most powerful ruler of the Tlachinollan Kingdom in Guerrero is depicted as a jaguar devouring a man and transforming into a god. The ruler, Quiyahuitl Tecuhtli, satisfied conditions as a nahual, being a noble and born on the first day of the "Rain" calendar. Two regions of the Tlachinollan Kingdom were Tlapa and Tlachinollan until 1421 when a single ruler, likely being the god depicted, combined them into the one kingdom. This codex along with Codex Azoyú II and supplemental pictorial manuscripts known as the Humboldt Fragment 1 and the Lienzo de Tlapa show the reign of Lord Rain during approximately 1421 to 1564, and are thought to have been created for resolving issues of royal succession.

==== Codex Azoyú II ====
A complement to Codex Azoyú I, pictures depict the jaguar sacrificing a man. Along with the other manuscripts mentioned above, a broader history of present-day Guerrero is depicted through the Tlapa-Tlachinollan development under the Rain God and eventual Spanish conquest.

== Material Analysis ==
Present day material analysis conducted on the two codices supports the timeline depicted in the manuscripts. Researchers in archaeological science detected gypsum and indigo fluorescence that corresponds with the types of dyes used in Mesoamerica, yet later portions of the codices also contained inorganic pigments commonly used in Europe during the second half of the sixteenth century. These results are consistent with the idea that native Mesoamerican methods and European methods of dye creation and history recording were prevalent during the period of the codices birth. It is likely that Mesoamerican traditions in Tlapa-Tlachniollan existed during and succeeding Spanish conquest.
