= Andreas Neufert =

German art historian (born 1961)

- Born: August 16, 1961 (age 64); Munich, West Germany
- Occupations: Art historian, writer, biographer
- Website: andreasneufert.com

Andreas Neufert (born August 16, 1961) is a German art historian.

== Biography ==
On his father's side Neufert is related to the architect Ernst Neufert (1900–1986), to the philologist Friedrich Vollmer (1867–1923), to Anna Maria Lasinsky (Freiin von Knapp) (1782–1839) the German-Polish romantic poet, and to the German-Polish Lasinsky family. On his mother's side he has German-English ancestors in the families Garrels and Russell.

Neufert studied art history, philosophy and literature at LMU Munich, the University of Vienna, and the University of Paris, and took his doctorate at the Witten/Herdecke University. His dissertation about the Austrian-Mexican surrealist Wolfgang Paalen is mainly concerned with the aspect of the Viennese philosophical tradition of (logical positivism, Ludwig Wittgenstein, Ernest Mach). It was published in 1999 under the title Im Inneren des Wals at Springer-Verlag Vienna/New York. From 1993 to 1994, he worked as guest curator at the Museum Moderner Kunst – Stiftung Ludwig, Vienna, and 1994 as co-curator of the retrospective exhibition Wolfgang Paalen in the Carrillo Gil Art Museum, Mexico City; Neufert became a regular guest-curator at the MACG, Mexiko (1994–98) and realized f.e. exhibitions like Recuerdo del Paraiso eternal, André Breton. He has extensively researched the life of Wolfgang Paalen, the surrealist artist and thinker. In 2015, he published the 700-page biography on Paalen Auf Liebe und Tod (Begriffsklärung) (Parthas Berlin). In 2019, he curated a Wolfgang Paalen Retrospective Exhibition for the Österreichische Galerie Belvedere in Vienna.

Neufert has three children and lives with his family in Berlin-Schöneberg and in Bork am See (Brandenburg). Since 2002 he has worked as a freelance curator and author.

== Selected works ==
- Engagement und Distanz. Aspekte einer Sammlung. Edition van de Loo, Munich, 1992, (collection of 35 Essays by Andreas Neufert about Pierre Alechinsky, Günter Brus, Jean Dubuffet, Asger Jorn, Henri Michaux, Arnulf Rainer, Antonio Saura, Wols u.a.) (In German)
- Wolfgang Paalen. Im Inneren des Wals. – Monografie/Schriften/Oevrekatalog. Springer, Vienna/New York 1999. (In German)
- Aby Warburg’s Mnemosyne Atlas, Art versus Psychology – Psychology versus Art. in: (In)disciplinas: Estética e Historia del Arte en el Cruce de los Discursos, XXII. Coloquio Internacional de Historia del Arte, Hrsg.v. Lucero Enriquez, Universidad Nacional Autonoma de Mexico, Istituto de Investigaciones Esteticas, México, 1999, pp. 281–297
- Celos, miedo y delirio en el signo de la Luna. Essay, in: Alice Rahon. Una Surrealista en Mexico, Ausstellungskatalog Museo de Arte Moderno, Mexico-City, 2009, pp. 90–117 (In Spanish)
- The Totem as Sphinx, in: Dawn Adès, Rita Eder, and Graciela Speranza, Surrealism in Latin America, Vivismo Muerto, Getty Research Institute (Issues & Debates), Los Angeles, 2012, pp. 111–129
- Auf Liebe und Tod. Das Leben des Surrealisten Wolfgang Paalen (A Matter of Life and Death. The Life of the Surrealist Wolfgang Paalen), Berlin: Parthas, 2015 (In German)
