= Fumage =

Surrealist art technique

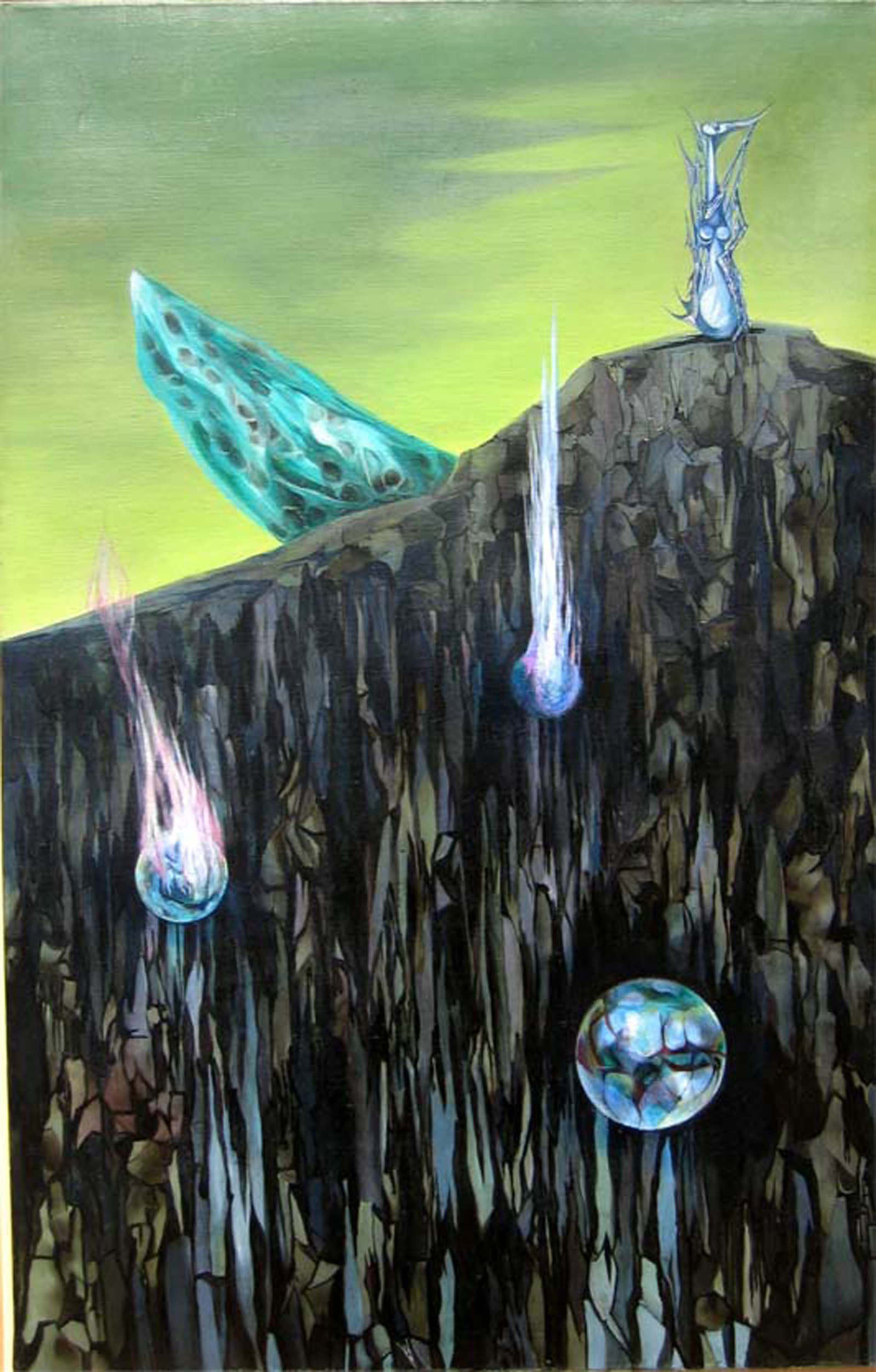
Wolfgang Paalen, Pays interdit ("Forbidden Land"), 1936–37, oil painting

Fumage is a surrealist art technique popularized by Wolfgang Paalen in which impressions are made by the smoke of a candle or kerosene lamp on a piece of paper or canvas. The earliest documented practitioner of the technique was American clockmaker Silas Hoadley whose circa 1810-1820 fumage decorated clock is in the permanent collection of the Museum of Fine Arts Boston. Paalen's first fumage, Dictated by a Candle, was presented 1936 in the International Surrealist Exhibition in London. In the same year Paalen painted Pays interdit ("Forbidden Land"), his first oil painting, which he based on the fumage technique. Several other Surrealists as Roberto Matta, but also Salvador Dalí later utilized the technique, Dali calling the technique "sfumato". The technique has been utilized by artists including Bimal Banerjee, Alberto Burri, Burhan Doğançay, Jiri Georg Dokoupil, Hugh Parker Guiler, Yves Klein, Julia Thecla, Antonio Muñiz, and Otto Piene.

== In popular media ==
Guiler's usage of the fumage technique is depicted briefly in the 1987 film Henry and June and his fumage pictures were often used as the covers for his wife Anaïs Nin's books.

== Scholarship ==
Scholar Mary Flanagan compared the technique to the reading of tea leaves and to the Rorschach test. José Antonio Pérez Esteban's 2013 doctoral thesis analyzes fumage art, especially "soot paintings" by Jiri Georg Dokoupil.

== See also ==
- Surrealist techniques
- Pyrography
