= César Moro =

Peruvian poet and painter (1903–1956)

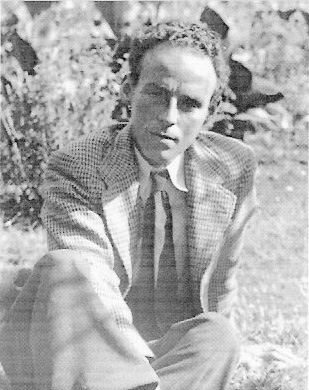
- César Moro c. 1940
- Born: Alfredo Quíspez-Asín Mas; August 31, 1903; Lima, Peru
- Died: January 10, 1956 (aged 52); Lima, Peru
- Occupations: Writer, artist, teacher
- Writing career
- Period: 20th century
- Genres: Poetry, essays, painting, collage
- Notable work: La tortuga ecuestre
- Movement: Surrealism

César Moro (August 31, 1903 – January 10, 1956) is the pseudonym of Alfredo Quíspez-Asín Mas, a Peruvian poet and painter. Most of his poetic works are written in French; he was the only Latin American poet included in the 1920s and '30s surrealist journals of André Breton and the first Latin American artist to join the surrealist group on his own initiative, as opposed to being recruited by Breton.

== Life and career ==
Moro moved to Paris on August 30, 1925, initially to pursue ballet dancing, but shortly after focused his artistic efforts on creating art and poetry. He participated in his first group exhibition at the Cabinet Maldoror in Brussels alongside Santos Balmori, Jaime Colson, and Isaías de Santiago. He contributed to the Surrealist artistic and literary movement while in France, becoming fully integrated into the group by the 1930s. He openly criticized the politics of the time by contributing writings to La mobilisation contre la guerre n'est pas la paix (Mobilization Against the War is Not Peace), an anti-war manifesto. Moro embraced the Surrealist's critiques of bourgeois social values and cultural hierarchies. He used Surrealist art and literature to "articulate his own marginality or sense of invisibility as a homosexual man negotiating his place in the international art world."

Around 1926, Moro briefly adopted a more cubist style of painting and shifted away from depicting Peruvian scenes. This likely came as a "response to expectations of primitivism and nationally specific subject matter in Paris."

Moro returned to Lima in 1933 and attempted to establish himself as a leader of Surrealism in South America, following in the footsteps of César Vallejo and José Carlos Mariátegui who had both published analyses of Surrealism. He produced art and literature while in Peru, established a museum, and taught art classes for the mentally ill at Hospital Larco Herrera. In 1935, he co-organized the first ever Surrealist Exposition in South America with Emilio Adolfo Westphalen at the Academy Alcedo in Lima.

In 1938 Moro was forced to flee Lima to avoid arrest for publishing and distributing a "clandestine pamphlet in support of the Spanish Republic." Moro relocated in Mexico City as a cultural ambassador to the French government. Here, he connected with various progressive artists of the time, including Wolfgang Paalen, Alice Rahon, Xavier Villaurrutia, Remedios Varo, Gordon Onslow Ford, and Leonora Carrington. Moro organized the 1940 Exposición internacional del surrealismo (International Exposition of Surrealism) at the Galería de Arte Mexicano in Mexico City, with help from Wolfgang Paalen and with guidance from André Breton. The exhibition included work by artists from all over Europe, South America, and the United States. Four of Moro's artworks were included in the international section of the exposition, including Pedestrian (1926), Untitled Painting with the Inscription "Eluard" (1926), The Art of Reading the Future (1935), and Cover for the Blind (1939). In 1944 Moro broke with the Surrealist movement and established close connections with Mexican artists of Los Contemporáneos. In Mexico, Moro had his poetry published in various journals and periodicals, and had his avant-garde and surrealist texts circulated throughout the country.

In 1948 Moro returned to Lima where he taught at the Alianza Francesa and the Colegio Militar Leoncio Prado until his death in 1956. Moro's friend André Coyné, a French poet and art critic, is credited with safeguarding and organizing Moro's works after his death.

== Works ==
Selected works:

- 1926: Pedestrian (used as the cover of the Surrealist Exposition of South America catalogue)
- 1943: Le château de grisou
- 1944: Lettre d'amour (frontispiece by Alice Paalen (Rahon))
- 1954: Trafalgar Square (illustrated by Remedios Varo)
- 1957: La tortuga ecuestre y otros poemas
- 1973: Amour à mort
- 1987: L'ombre du paradisier et autres textes
