= Alice Rahon =

French-born Mexican painter and writer (1904–1987)

- Alice Rahon, photograph by Man Ray
- Born: Alice Marie Ivonne Philippot; 8 June 1904; Chenecey-Buillon, France
- Died: September 1987 (aged 83); Mexico City, Mexico
- Known for: Painting, Writing
- Movement: Surrealism
- Spouse(s): Wolfgang Paalen, 1934, ending in divorce Edward Fitzgerald, ending in divorce
- Website: alicerahon.org

Alice Phillipot (Alice Rahon) (8 June 1904 – September 1987) was a French-born Mexican poet and artist whose work contributed to the beginning of abstract expression in Mexico. She began as a surrealist poet in Europe but began painting in Mexico. She was a prolific artist from the late 1940s to the 1960s, exhibiting frequently in Mexico and the United States, with a wide circle of friends in these two countries. Her work remained tied to surrealism but was also innovative, including abstract elements and the use of techniques such as sgraffito and the use of sand for texture. She became isolated in her later life due to health issues.

== Life ==
Rahon was born Alice Marie Yvonne Philppot in Chenecey-Buillon, Quingey in the east of France. Her father Jean-Louis Philippot, was a valet and painter, while her mother Alphonsine Rahon worked as a cook.

Rahon's most vivid memories of childhood were of Brittany, the house of her paternal grandparents in Roscoff, where she passed long periods of time in the summer and during the Christmas holidays. She also remembered visiting the beaches of Morlaix.

When about three years old, she suffered a serious accident which put her in casts and affected the rest of her life. One of the injuries was a fracture in the right hip, which forced her to recuperate lying down for long periods of time. This left her isolated from other children, including her younger sister Geo, and she passed the time in the family garden reading, writing and drawing to occupy her mind. Her isolation and sense of fragility were reinforced when she fell again at age twelve, breaking a leg. For the rest of her life she always walked with a slight limp and pain.

By the time she was a teenager, she preferred solitude, creating worlds of her own imagination. Her father, an academic artist had taught her to draw and encouraged her artistic pursuits

She became pregnant very young, but the child had a congenital defect and died soon after birth.

The Philippot family moved to Paris in 1920,and Rahon and her sister Georgette became enmeshed in Paris bohemian scene. Rahon supported herself by working as a model and through her writing. She was friends with Man Ray, Picasso and Joan Miró.

In 1931, while visiting Corsica she met artist Wolfgang Paalen and they married in 1934. With him she became involved with the Surrealist movement, published poetry under the name Alice Paalen, and met others such as Eva Sulzer, a Swiss photographer, with whom she was lifelong friends.

Her life with Paalen also introduced her to travel, which she did much of during her life. In 1933, the couple visited the cave paintings at Altamira and in 1936, she traveled to India accompanied by poet Valentine Penrose. Both of these travels had impact on her life and art, even naming two cats Vishnu and Subhashini in her late life. She traveled extensively during much of her life with later voyages to Alaska, Canada, the United States, Lebanon and in Mexico.

Rahon, Paalen and Sulzer were invited to visit Mexico by Andre and Jacqueline Breton and Frida Kahlo . They first traveled in Alaska, British Columbia and the U.S. west coast, where Paalen became fascinated by indigenous art. They finally arrived to Mexico City in 1939 by an invitation from Kahlo in Paris, at first staying in a hotel in the San Ángel neighborhood. She became friends with Kahlo and Diego Rivera. With Kahlo she shared frustrations of a fragile body and the inability to have children as well as using art and writing to pass the time. The bond with Frida led to the later creation of a painting called La balada para Frida Kahlo. Both the couples' fascination with the country and the outbreak of World War II in 1939 prompted them to remain permanently in the country, with Rahon becoming a Mexican citizen in 1946.

In 1947, Alice and Paalen divorced. She named herself Rahon, and married the Canadian Edward Fitzgerald. However, this relationship ended several years later after the two worked on a film together. From then, Rahon's social life revolved around friends in various artistic, intellectual and foreign exile circles, which she had begun in Europe. By the 1950s, these friendships included Rufino Tamayo, Carlos Mérida, Octavio Paz, Henry Miller, Anaïs Nin, Henry Moore, Gordon Onslow Ford and his wife, along with Kahlo and Diego Rivera. She also maintained contacts with groups of artists in New York and California. After her death, a record she kept of these people's lives and deaths was found. She also continued to travel frequently, in part because of her art exhibits in the United States and Mexico but she also visited many cities in Mexico and spent long periods in Acapulco. One reason for this was that she was a strong swimmer despite her physical problems, moving more comfortably in the water than on land.

In 1967, Rahon had another accident, this time falling down stairs at the opening of a show at the Galería Pecanins in Mexico City. This time, she injured her spine, but she refused medical treatment, stating that doctors had tortured her enough as a child. The injury caused her to become a recluse. She was the subject of an exhibit at the Galería de Arte Mexicano in 1975, and a retrospective at the Palacio de Bellas Artes in 1986, but for the last years of her life, she lived practically in seclusion in her house in Tlaquepaque, visited by only a few friends such as Eva Sulzer and American professor Wayne Siewart, whom she had known since the 1950s. She lived surrounded by mementoes of her life, including books signed by the likes of Breton, Paul Éluard, poems by Picasso, letters from Henry Moore and Anaïs Nin, paintings dedicated by Yves Tanguy and Paalen, and old photographs and souvenirs.

By 1987, she could no longer take care of herself in her home and was placed in a nursing home. Refusing food, she died four months later in September 1987.

== Career ==
Rahon's first career was as a poet. In 1935, she became part of the Surrealist movement in Europe, meeting artists such as Paul Eluard and Max Ernst through her husband. In France, she published 'A meme la terre' with a print by Yves Tanguy, and in 1938 Sablier Couche, illustrated by Joan Miró. Both projects were supported by André Breton. André Breton and the other Paris Surrealists honored her by dedicating both of the "A"s in the name of the Gradiva Gallery to Alice. She was the first female to be published in Editions Surréalistes in Paris in 1936. Her first book that the Surrealists published was called "Bare Ground." She came out with her second book the "Hourglass Lying Down" a year later, which was illustrated by Pablo Picasso. She also wrote 'Muttra' and other poems while in India with Hindi influence, as well as poems related to the work of painters she admired, such as Picasso. In Mexico, Rahon gradually left poetry, but she did publish one last collection of works called 'Noir Animal', in which appears a portrait of Alice painted by Paalen. She also contributed some poems and illustrations to Wolfgang Paalen's DYN (magazine), which published writing in English and French about Mexico for foreign audiences. However, her work with DYN was mostly as editor, working with writers such as Alfonso Caso, Miguel Covarrubias and Jorge Enciso . She utilized Poem-Painting in her illustrations in Dyn, that were inspired by pre-Columbian pieces of artwork and especially petrographs, which she used throughout her painting career. However, even as a painter, she remained connected to poetry, illustrating the writings of others such as Chateau de Grissou by Cesar Moro.

Her career as a painter and visual artist spanned almost forty years, starting shortly after she arrived to Mexico in 1939. She was supported in this endeavor by husband Wolfgang Paalen, who helped her get her first exhibits in 1944 and 1945 at the Galería de Arte Mexicano with Inés Amor, then in California and New York. She exhibited frequently, especially from the late 1940s into the 1960s in Mexico, the United States and even in Beirut, working frequently with artists and writers living outside their native Europe.

Other artistic endeavors included theater and film. In the late 1940s, she became interested in the genre, especially puppet theater. She created the script and costume design for a production called Orion, el gran hombre del cielo; however, it was never produced during her lifetime. However, it was revived in 2009 for a retrospective of Rahon's work at the Museo de Arte Moderno by a group called Laboratorio de la Máscara. They used her original notes and sketches to create sets and choreography inspired by dances from India. She worked on a film with her second husband Edward Fitzgerald, about a magician that lived at the bottom of the sea called Les Magiciens. The main character was sometimes represented by an actor and other times by a marionette. It was a costly and long project, with Rahon making chutney and other foods in her kitchen to sell and help finance the project. Years later, the project was finished, but she had separated from Fitzgerald and the only copy of the experimental film was lost. Only a few stills from the film exist.

By the late 1960s, she painted rarely. She withdrew from the art world, with only one major exhibit of her work, a retrospective at the Palacio de Bellas Artes in 1986, sponsored by Teresa del Conde who was head of INBA at the time. Her isolation in her later years meant that no one was promoting her work and she was almost forgotten by younger generations of artists and art historians, despite her important role in the development of Mexican art . However, in 2009, the Museo de Arte Moderno held a major retrospective of her work, which, along with inclusion in a collective exhibition at the Museo Mural Diego Rivera the same year, was the first public showing of her work since 1986.

In 2012 her work was included in the exhibition In Wonderland: The Surrealist Adventures of Women Artists in Mexico and the United States at the Los Angeles County Museum of Art. In 2022 the Gallery Wendi Norris in San Francisco held a solo exhibition of her work entitled Uncovering Alice Rahon. In 2023 her work was included in the exhibition Action, Gesture, Paint: Women Artists and Global Abstraction 1940-1970 at the Whitechapel Gallery in London. Her work is included in the collection of the Art Institute of Chicago and the Museum of Modern Art.

== Artistry ==
Rahon's early artistic work was in poetry, often writing about scenes and landscapes from her childhood, as well as about her immobility and nostalgia.

However, after arriving in Mexico, she began to paint, firstly in watercolours, inspired by the colours of her surroundings in Mexico. Most of her later work was in oils, but she also created drawings, collages and objects. The main influences in her work are surrealism, poetry, her travels and Mexico. Her work has been described as primitive and intensely poetic, “breathing with and inner life.” Her paintings have some link to surrealism but are also tied to her experiences in Mexico and her use of colour, light and the appearance of landscapes show influence from poetry. Influence from cave paintings and tribal art from her travels can also be seen. Her works were considered mature from the beginning, with abstract elements (not accepted in Mexico at the time) but still representing something concrete, almost always natural phenomena. Her surrealist influence was mostly from Paalen. However, she is also classed with other surrealist artists from Europe in Mexico, such as Remedios Varo and Leonora Carrington . Unlike these two, she did not confine herself to oils but experimented with techniques, especially those related to texture, showing influence from Rufino Tamayo.

Her themes include landscapes, elements from myths, legends, Mexican festivals, and elements of nature, along with mythical cities (which represent introspective worlds) and homage to various artists that she admired. Water appeared often, both in form and as the color blue. She made series of paintings related to rivers, similar to those created by Paul Klee titled El Nilo, Rio Papaloapan, Rio Papagayos and Encuentro de Rivieras (painted many years later). She created paintings to honor Giorgio de Chirico, Frida Kahlo, Diego Rivera, Joan Miró and Pablo Neruda . Two dedicated to Frida Kahlo include La balada de Frida Kahlo (made shortly after Frida's death), as well as Frida aux yeux d’hirondelle in 1956, which was reworked a decade later.

While surrealist, her work also demonstrates the beginning of abstract art in Mexico in the 1940s, along with Carlos Mérida, Gunther Gerzso and Wolfgang Paalen. She was also a pioneer in the use of sand, sgraffito and other textures on her canvases.

== Bibliography ==
- Lourdes Andrade (1998). Alice Rahon : magia de la mirada [Alice Rahon: magic in the look] (in Spanish). Mexico City: CONACULTA. ISBN 970-18-1390-1.
- Deffebach, Nancy. "Alice Rahon: de poeta frances a pintora mexicana." In Alice Rahon. Una Surrealista en México 1939-1987 Exhibition catalogue. Mexico City: Museo de Arte Moderno, 2009.
- Deffebach, Nancy. "Alice Rahon" Poems of Light and Shadow, Painting in Free Verse." Onthebus vol.3, no 2 and vol.4, no. 1 (December 1991); 174–96.
- Rahon Alice Paalen: Shapeshifter, translated from the French by Mary Ann Caws. NYRB Poets ISBN 9781681375007
