= Eva Sulzer =

Photographer, musician, collector and filmmaker

Eva Sulzer (born 1902 Winterthur, Switzerland – died 1990 in Mexico City) was a photographer, musician, collector, and filmmaker who is most renowned for her photographs of pre-Columbian sights through Central and North America, including Canada, Alaska, and Mexico. She also had a substantial collection of pre-Columbian artifacts and indigenous art pieces. She worked closely with the artist Wolfgang Paalen and other surrealist emigres in Mexico during the early 1940s. Artists who participated in the DYN circle with Wolfgang Paalen enriched their work collaboratively by expressing their personality as an artist. Eva Sulzer became a part of the DYN Circle in Mexico, where they were influenced by scientific discoveries and Mexico's pre-Columbian movement to practice expressionism.

== Photographs ==
Many of her photographs were published in the DYN surrealist journal written and published by Wolfgang Paalen. Sulzer was the primary financial backer and photograph contributor for DYN. Sulzer's intimate images and subtle focuses on feminine icons in pre-Columbian art ring a strong feminist undertone to her images and set her aside from her male contemporaries in Paris and New York. While mainly referred to in context of Paalen, Sulzer was an artist in her own right and continued to live and work in Mexico as a photographer and filmmaker until her death in 1990. As well as contributing to the artistic sensibilities of the DYN surrealist circle, Sulzer also implemented archeological and anthropological aspects to her and her colleagues writings and works. Sulzer also contributed from her collection of pre-Columbian art to Miguel Covarrubias popular anthologies about Mexican anthropology. In 2012 an array of Sulzer's photographs were displayed in an exhibition entitled “Farewell to Surrealism: The Dyn Circle in Mexico” as an homage to the debut publication of the Dyn circle's journal. The exhibition brought Sulzer to light as a seemingly under-researched and unknown 20th-century woman artist. Much more research is still to be done on Sulzer as a singular entity working in the art world and in the mediums of photography, film, and music.

== Wolfgang Paalen and Eva Sulzer ==
Paalen and Sulzer met at a Baltic resort in 1931. Sulzer then decided to return to Paris with Paalen, and they remained close for the remainder of Paalen's life. In 1939 Sulzer traveled with Paalen and Rahon to visit pre-Columbian sites in Northwest Canada, Alaska, and Mexico. Many photographs taken on this trip are the ones published in DYN. Although Paalen was married to the artist Alice Rahon, it has been stated that Rahon, Paalen, and Sulzer were involved in a polyamorous triad, which is highly representative of the open minded sensibilities of the Dyn circle.
