= Gustav Regler =

German writer

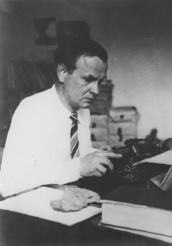
Gustav Regler in Mexico (c. 1944)

Gustav Regler (25 May 1898 – 14 January 1963) was a German writer and journalist.

== Background ==
Gustav Regler was born on 25 May 1898 in Merzig, in the Prussian Rhine Province (now Saarland).

== Career ==
Emblem of the International Brigades

Regler served in the German Infantry during the First World War and was seriously injured. He joined the Communist Party and spent time in the USSR. He later served as political commissar of the XII International Brigade during the Spanish Civil War. Whilst in Spain he befriended Ernest Hemingway and was wounded at the Battle of Guadalajara.

As a Communist, he was long-time friend of Arthur Koestler, first in Berlin, then Paris and during the Spanish Civil War. Regler's books were banned in the Third Reich. While in Spain, he wrote articles as a special correspondent for the Deutsche Zentral Zeitung. He accompanied Lillian Hellman on a visit to a Benicàssim hospital in October 1937.

== Works ==
Regler wrote about his Spanish experiences in his novel Das große Beispiel [The great example], translated as The Great Crusade (New York, 1940), introduced by Ernest Hemingway, translated by Whittaker Chambers.

His memoirs were published as The Owl of Minerva in London in 1959. Time magazine called him the German "Malraux."

== Personal life and death ==
Regler eventually broke with the Soviet Communist Party and took refuge in Mexico where he lived the last years of his life in Tepoztlán with his second wife Margaret (Peggy). He died while traveling in India to receive a prize at age 65 and his body was burned on the ghats of the Benares river.

== Sources ==
- Hugh Thomas The Spanish Civil War 2003. 4th Rev ed.
- Gustav Regler, The Owl of Minerva, Hart-Davis, London, 1959.
- "A Ghost Walks," Time, March 7, 1960 (review of The Owl of Minerva)
