= Minotaure =

French surrealist magazine

- Minotaure, No. 1: June 1, 1933 (Pablo Picasso)
- Managing Editor: Albert Skira (editor-in-chief); E. Tériade (artistic director)
- Categories: Surrealism
- Publisher: Albert Skira
- Founded: 1933
- Final issue: 1939
- Country: France
- Based in: Paris
- Language: French

Minotaure was a Surrealist-oriented magazine founded by Albert Skira and E. Tériade in Paris and published in French between 1933 and 1939. Minotaure published on the plastic arts, poetry and literature, the avant garde, as well as articles on esoteric and unusual aspects of literary and art histories. Also included were psychoanalytical studies and artistic aspects of anthropology and ethnography. It was a lavish and extravagant magazine by the standards of the 1930s, profusely illustrated with high quality reproductions of art, often in color.

== History ==
The review was originally founded by E. Tériade (Stratis Eleftheriadis) and Albert Skira with the desire to produce a lavish magazine on "The plastic arts - poetry - music - architecture - ethnography and mythology - theater - psychoanalytical studies and observations." Although not intended to be strictly a surrealist review, Albert Skira had been associating with André Breton and others in the movement and invited their input, even before the first issue was published. Skira's only restriction for Breton was that he not use the review as a forum to advocate his political views. The original editor was E. Tériade, but that role was soon taken over by Skira, who formed an editorial committee that included André Breton, Marcel Duchamp, Paul Eluard, Maurice Heine, and Pierre Mabille, giving it a heavy surrealist bias early on. E. Tériade remained involved as the artistic director for several years, but ultimately departed in December 1937, in part due to the ever-increasing surrealist direction of the review, which only left Minotaure under the even greater influence of André Breton and the surrealists. By 1939 André Breton had a falling out with Paul Eluard, and Eluard and Marcel Duchamp left the editorial committee as well. Breton had virtually taken over editorship of Minotaure by the 1939 issue, however his tenure was short lived with the outbreak of World War II, an exodus of surrealists to the United States, and Albert Skira's return to Switzerland in the following months.

The name Minotaure is attributed to Georges Bataille and André Masson, suggested "during a meeting with [Roger] Vitrac, [Robert] Desnos, and E. Tériade, who were in favor of calling the review L'Age d'Or." The theme of the Minotaur and/or the labyrinth, had already appeared in the work of several artist and writers including Georges Bataille, André Breton, Max Ernst, André Masson, as well as a number of drawings that Pablo Picasso had made on Greek mythology subjects. In the age of Freud, the metaphor of the Minotaur and the labyrinth had been popular in several circles of intellectuals in the 1920s and 1930s; the labyrinth being analogous to the mind, the Minotaur representing mysterious irrational impulses hidden within, and Theseus - the conscious mind, entering the labyrinth and slaying the Minotaur, emerging victorious, - with a greater self-knowledge; a paradigm for psychoanalyst and the surrealist theater as well.

Minotaure was a luxurious review in its day, featuring original artworks on the cover by prominent artists like Matisse, Picasso, Duchamp, Miró, and Dalí, and it grew more lavish with each passing year. Some volumes had various entries printed on papers of different colors, textures, and thicknesses bound into one. The drawings of artists were sometimes reproduced on fine art papers, like the originals. Later volumes featured color insets, high quality tipped-in color plates, an element that was later to become a trademark in Skira's art book series published after the war. Minotaure had 800 subscribers when the first issue was published in June 1933. The original selling price was 25 francs (no. 1–9), going up to 30 francs (no. 10–11), with the double issues selling for 40 francs (no. 3/4) and 60 francs (no, 12/13). Due to financial difficulties it was published at irregular intervals. The British art patron/collector and poet, Edward James soon came to be an important sponsor and adviser of the magazine. With an international circulation in several European countries, the journal was a significant element in Surrealism's rise from a relatively obscure circle of poets, artist, and intellectuals in the 1920s to a major movement of twentieth century art. It is a significant and historical reference for information on surrealism and has been the subject of two facsimile reprints. It was one in a succession of surrealist reviews including La Révolution Surréaliste (1924–1929) and Le Surrealisme au service de la revolution (1930–1933), Minotaure (1933–1939) and VVV (1942–1944). In fact, in the last issue of Le Surrealisme au service de la revolution (1933), Breton published a full-page advertisement for the first issue of Minotaure (1933). Minotaure was by far the most lavish, inclusive, and widely distributed of the four.

== Contributors and content ==
Minotaure published original poetry, automatic writing, fiction, and high quality reproductions of artworks, as well as important essays and writings on surrealist theory and philosophy. In addition to the writings of André Breton, Paul Eluard, and Benjamin Péret; Salvador Dalí, often underestimated as a writer, contributed essays to eight issues, including writings on art theory like his paranoid-critical technique. Maurice Heine, one of the editorial committee members, was a major figure in rediscovering and publishing the work of the Marquis de Sade and he produced articles for most volumes of Minotaure. The participation of E. Tériade added a significant dimension to Minotaure, with contributions in most of the issues on art and artist beyond the surrealist movement, like Matisse and Fauvism. Surrealist views on architecture were presented in articles by Tristan Tzara, "D'un certain automatisme du goût", Salvador Dalí, "De la beauté terrifiante et comestible, de l'architecture Modern' style", and Roberto Matta, "Mathématiques sensibles - Architecture du Temps". Other poets and writers included Georges Bataille, Jacques Brunius, René Crevel, Léon Paul Fargue, Georges Hugnet, Edward James, Marcel Jean, Henri Michaux, Jacques Prévert, Herbert Read, and Pierre Reverdy.

Several important artists of the twentieth century received some of their earliest, or first recognition in Minotaure like Hans Bellmer and his doll, Victor Brauner, Paul Delvaux, Alberto Giacometti, Roberto Matta, Kurt Seligmann, and Frida Kahlo. The Balthus painting The Street (1933, Museum of Modern Art, New York) was reproduced for the first time in Minotaure. Minotaure was the first to reproduce Picasso's sculptures too. Mexican print maker José Guadalupe Posada was featured in one issue. Many important photographers contributed regularly or were featured in the journal including Bill Brandt, Brassai, Dora Maar, Man Ray, and Raoul Ubac. Other diverse and unexpected figures such as Le Corbusier, André Derain, and Ambroise Vollard all contributed articles at one time or another, as did composers Kurt Weill and Igor Markevitch.

Physician and writer Pierre Mabille, with expertise on anthropology, sociology and medicine was on the editorial committee and contributed articles to many of the volumes. Concordantly, Minotaure kept an "open house to the essays" from a wide range of philosophers, psychologists, anthropologist, historians, and other specialists including Jean Wahl, Roger Caillois, Pierre Courthion, and Michel Leiris. Minotaure published the first essays of Jacques Lacan, the noted French psychiatrist and philosopher. The entire second issue was devoted to Mission Dakar-Djibouti, an expedition to Africa commissioned by the French state and conducted by the Musée d'Ethnographie du Trocadéro under the direction of Marcel Griaule from 1931 to 1933. This science-based, anthropological project was conducted to survey, document, collect, and examine, ethnographic dances, music, paintings, arts, and cultures of Africa, although it was not without some political and economic motivations, bolstering the French colonial position in Africa in opposition to the growing British influence there. More than 3,000 objects were deposited in the museum, along with 6,000 photographs, 1,600 meters of films, and extensive field notes; many of which were featured in Minotaure.

== Facsimile reprints ==
Two facsimile editions of the complete 13 volume journal have been published. The first facsimile was published in 1968 by Arno Press, New York, with an introduction in English and French by Albert Skira. The Arno Press edition was in four red cloth hardcover volumes (13 x 11 in.), including illustrations, advertisements and a cumulative index: Vol, I 1933; Vol. II, 1934–1935; Vol. III, 1936–1937, Vol. IV, 1938–1939. The second facsimile edition was published in 1981 by Editions d'art Albert Skira/Imprimeries Reunies, Geneve-Lausanne. The Skira facsimile edition, Minotaure. Revue artistique et litteraire, was published in quarto (4to) format (12.6 x 10 in.), hardbound with dust jackets and slipcases in three volumes: Vol. I, 1933; Vol. II, 1934–1936; Vol. III, 1936–1939.

== Minotaure volumes and tables of contents ==
=== No. 1: June 1, 1933 ===
Cover by Pablo Picasso: Pierre Reverdy, L'art du russan [The Art of Russian]. Paul Éluard, Un visage dans l'herbe [A Face in the Grass]. Maurice Raynal, Coups de fenchez mot. André Breton, A propos de la reditom Coutes d'Achim d'Aruim. E. Tériade, Peintures [Paintings]. René Crevel, L'enjamci de l'art [The Art of Art]. Marcel Jean, Chonogrammes. E. Tériade, Marcel Jean, Les Présages, ballet, par André Masson [The Omens, ballet by André Masson]. Max Raphael, Le Fronton de Corfon [About the Corfu pediment]. André Breton, Picasso dans son élément [Picasso in his Element]. André Breton, Crucifixions. Pablo Picasso, Une Anatomie [An Anatomy]. Pierre Reverdy, Note éternelle du Présent [Eternal Note of the Present]. Maurice Raynal, Variété du corps humain [Variety of the Human Body]. E. Tériade, Valeur plastique du mouvement [Plastic Value Movement]. Max Raphael, Notes sur de Baroque [Notes on the Baroque]. Maurice Heine, Dramaturgie de Sade. D. A. F. de Sade, Sujet de Zélonide. André Masson: Massacres. Paul Éluard, Le miroir de Baudelaire [The Mirror of Baudelaire]. Salvador Dalí, Interprétation paranoiaque-critiquede l'image obsédante L'Angélus de Millet [Paranoid-critical Interpretation of the haunting image The Angelus of Millet]. Jacques M. É. Lacan, Le probléme du style et les formes paranoiaques de l'expérience [The Problem of Style and Paranoid Forms of Experience]. Kurt Weill, Les Sept Péchés capitaux [The Seven Deadly Sins]. Suite de dessins préparatoires de Henri Matisse pour "de L'Après-midi d'un fauna" de Stéphane Mallarmé [Set of preparatory drawings by Henri Matisse for "The Afternoon of a Fauna" by Stéphane Mallarmé]. Michel Leiris, Danses funéraires Dogon [Dogon Funeral Dances].

=== No. 2: June 1, 1933 ===
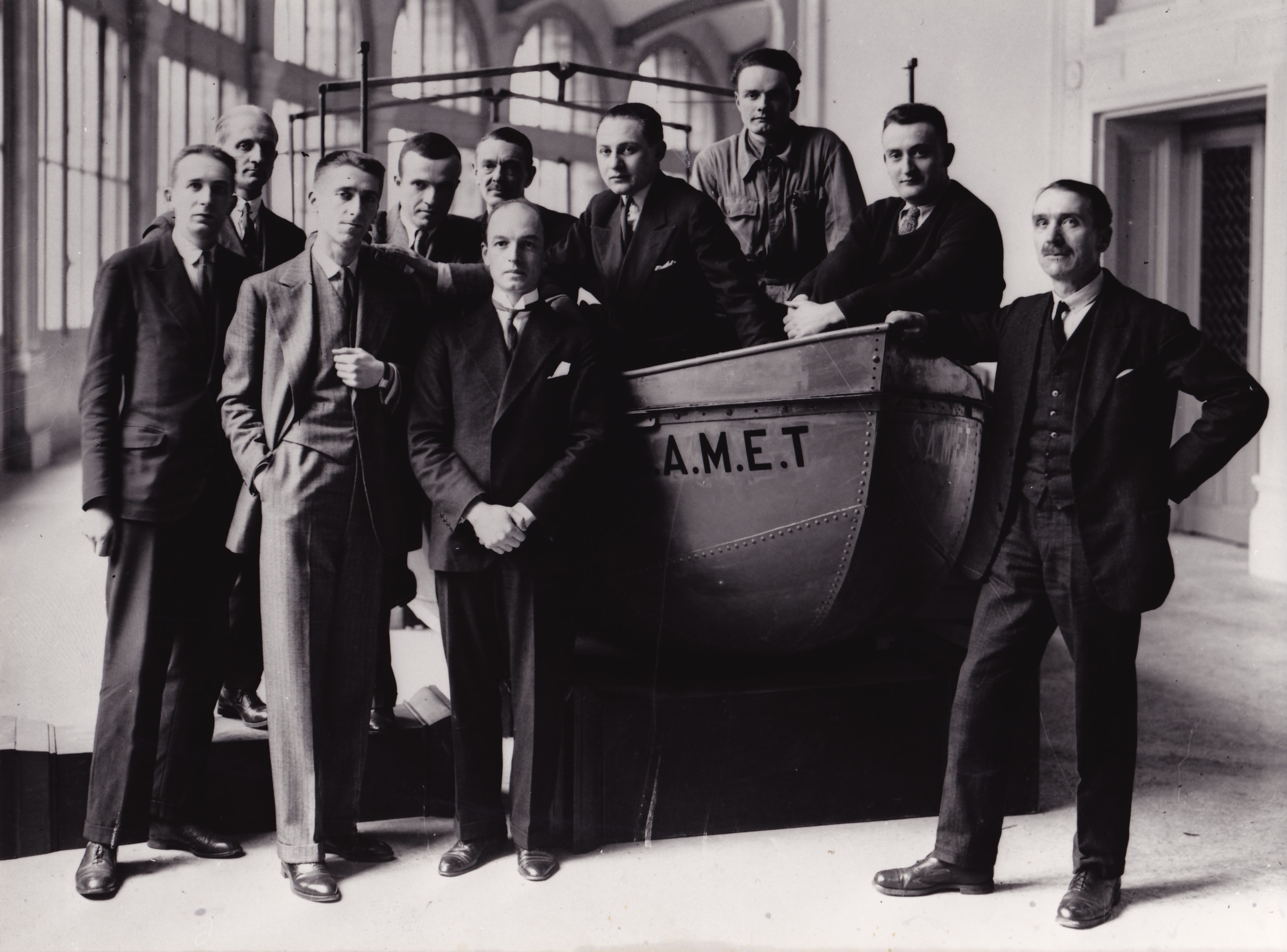
Members of the Dakar-Djibouti Mission at the Ethnographic Museum of Trocadero. Left to right: André Schaeffner, Jean Mouchet, Georges Henri Rivière, Michel Leiris, Baron Outomsky, Marcel Griaule, Éric Lutten, Jean Moufle, Gaston-Louis Roux, Marcel Larget

Cover by Gaston-Louis Roux. Mission Dakar-Djibouti: Paul Rivet and Georges-Henri Rivière, Mission Ethnographique et linguistique Dakar-Djibouti. [Ethnographic and Linguistic Mission Dakar-Djibouti]. Marcel Griaule, Introduction méthodologique [Methodological introduction]. Éric Lutten, Les "wasamba" et leur usage dan la circoncision [The "Wasamba" and their use of the circumcision]. Marcel Griaule, Le chasseur du 20 Octobre (cérémonies funéraires chez les Dogon de la falaise de Bandiagara, Soudan français) [The hunter of October 20 (Funeral ceremonies at the Dogon of the cliff of Bandiagara, French Sudan)]. André Schaeffner, Notes sur la musique des populations du Cameroun septentrional. [Notes on the music of the populations of northern Cameroon]. Deborah Lifszyc [Lifchitz], Amulettes éthiopiennes [Ethiopian Amulets]. Michel Leiris, Le taureau de Seyfou Tchenger (un sacrifice aux génies zar dans une secte de possédés, à Gondar, Abyssinie). [The bull of Seyfou Tchenger (a sacrifice to zar geniuses in a sect of possessed, in Gondar, Abyssinia)] Documents on. Faítes de cases des rives du (Bassin du Niger) [Making boxes on the banks of the (Niger Basin)]. Masques et casques de danse du Soudan français [Masks and dance helmets from French Sudan]. Serrures sculptées d'Afrique occidentale française [Carved locks from French West Africa]. Masques et objets rituels Dogon (Soudan français) [Dogon masks and ritual objects (French Sudan)]. Peintures rupestres de Songo (Soudan français) [Rock paintings of Songo (French Sudan)]. Sculptures, calebasses gravées et poteries du Dahomey [Sculptures, engraved calabashes and pottery from Dahomey]. Peintures anciennes de la Haute-Éthiopie [Ancient Paintings of Upper Ethiopia], etc. Numerous reproductions of scenes, types, sites, objects, and various documents relating to the regions traversed by the Mission.

=== No. 3-4: December 12, 1933 ===
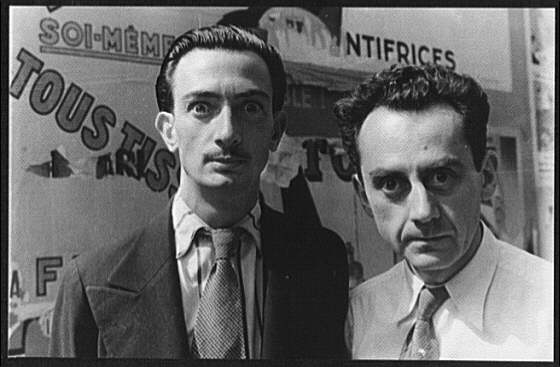
Salvador Dalí and Man Ray photographed in Paris in June of in 1934, a few months after the publication of Minotaure No. 3/4 (Dec. 1933) which included Dalí's article on Art Nouveau architecture, De la beauté terrifiante et comestible, de l'architecture Modern' style, illustrated with photographs by Man Ray and Brassai, and two Man Ray articles The Age of Light and Portraits of Women.

Cover by André Derain: Man Ray, L'Age de la Lumiére [The Age of Light]. Man Ray, Portraits de femmes [Portraits of Women]. Nadar, Portraits de femmes [Portraits of Women]. Brassai, Du mur des cavenrnes au mur d'usine [From the Cave Wall to the Factory Wall]. André Derain, Critérium des As [Criterium of Aces]. E. Tériade, Émancipation de la Peinture, La hasard la spontanéité et l'absence de modéle dans la peinture moderne. Quatre planches en couleurs. Trente reproductions inédites de [Emancipation of Painting, Chance spontaneity and lack of style in modern painting. Four plates in colors. Thirty unpublished reproductions of] Picasso, Matisse, Braque, Derain, Miro, Borés, Dalí, Beaudin. Pr. Ed. Claparéde, Le sommeil réaction de défense [Sleep Defense Reaction]. Dr. Jacques Lacan, Motifs du crime paranoiaque [Motives of Paranoid Crime]. Benjamin Péret, Au paradis des fantômes [In Paradise of the Phantoms]. Trente reproductions d'automates anciens et moderns [Thirty reproductions of old and modern automatons]. Paul Chardon, Horoscope de Jean-Arthur Rimbaud. Maurice Raynal, Dieu - table - cuvette [God - Table - Bowl]. Les ateliers de [The workshops of] Brancusi, Despiau, Giacometti, Laurens, Lipchitz, Maillol. photographiés par Brassai. André Breton, Le message automatique [The Automatic Message]. Etude sur l'oeuvre plastique médiums [Study on the plastic art mediums]. Eau-forte médianimique de Victorien Sardou [Medianimic etching by Victorien Sardou]. Ferdinand Brückner, L'Age de la Peru [The Age of Peru]. XXX, Scalptures involontaires [Involuntary Scalptures]. Salvador Dalí, De la beauté terrifiante et comestible, de l'architecture Modern' style, [On the Terrifying and Edible Beauty of Modern Style Architecture]. Photographs of Barcelona by Man Ray, photographs of Paris by Brassai. Maurice Heine, Note sur un elassement psycho-biologique des paresthésies sexuelles [Note on a Psycho-biological Outbreak of Sexual paresthesia]. Igor Markevitch, La musique est l'art de recréer le monde dans le domaine des sons [Music is the Art of Recreating the World in the Field of Sounds]. Jean Frois-Wittmann, L'art moderne et le principe du plaisir [Modern Art and the Pleasure Principle]. Tristan Tzara, D'un certain automatisme du Goût [Of a Certain Automatism of Taste]. Paul Eluard, Les plus belles cartes postales [The Most Beautiful Postcards]. Album de cent vingt-cinq cartes postales [Album of One Hundred and Twenty Five Postcards]. Et Cent quarante réponses à L'enquéte Sur La Rencontre [And One Hundred and Forty Answers to the survey asking Quelle a été la rencontre capitale de votre vie? (What was the most momentous encounter of your life?)].

=== No. 5: May 12, 1934 ===
Cover by Francisco Borès: Maurice Heine, Promenade à travers le Roman Noir [Walk Through the Roman Black]. Jean Lévy, King Kong. Max Ernst, Les Mystéres de la forét [The Mysteries of the Forest]. André Breton, La beauté sera convulsive [Beauty Will be Convulsive]. Paul Eluard, Par un apré-midi trés froid des preniers jours de 1713 ou le Monde tel qu'il est [By a Very Cold Afternoon of the First Days of 1713 or the World As It Is]. Color reproduction of the Epinal image "La Folie des Hommes ou le monde à rebours" [The Madness of Men or the World Backwards]. René Crevel, La grande mannequin cherche et trouve sa peau [The Great Model is Looking for and Finding Her Skin]. Salvador Dalí, Les nouvelles couleurs de "Sex Appeal spectral" [The New Colors of Spectral Sex Appeal]. Roger Caillois, La Mante religieuse [The Praying Mantis]. Man Ray, Danses-Horizons [Dances-Horizons]. Georges Hugnet, Petite réverie du Grand Veneur [Little Reverie of the Grand Hunter]. G. de Chirico, Sur le silence [On Silence]. E. Tériade, Aspect actuels de l'expression plastique [Present Aspects of the Plastic Expression], with a colored inset of a painting by Pablo Picasso. Reproductions of paintings, sculptures and drawings by Balthus, Beaudin, Borés, Braque, Dalí, Ernst, Gargallo, Giacometti, Huf, Klee, Laurens, Lipchitz, Manés, Miro, Picasso, Rattner, Roger, Roux, and Tanguy.

This specific volume is referenced in the dialog of the 1981 Louis Malle movie "My Dinner with André", as spoken by André Gregory's character André, who was born on May 11, 1934.

=== No. 6: December 5, 1934 ===
Cover by Marcel Duchamp: D Pierre Mabille, Prèface à l'éloge des préjugés populaires [Preface to the eulogy of popular prejudices]. Bill Brandt, Au cimetière des anciennes galères [At the Cemetery of the Ancient Galleys]. Brassai, Ciel Postiche [Sky Hairpiece]. Paul Éluard, Physique de la Poésie [Physics of Poetry], Blake, Goethe (Delacroix), Arnim, (Valentine Hugo), La motte-Fougué, (Rackham), Borel, Poe, (Manet), Baudelaire, (Redon), Lautreamont, (Dalí), Carroll, Nouveau (Rodin), Mallarmé, (Rops, Renoir, Matisse), Maeterlinck, (Minne), Apollinaire, (Picasso, Rouveeyre), Reverdy, (Derain, Matisse), Breton (Derain), Tzara, (Arp, Klee), Eluard, (Ernst, Tanguy), Péret, (Picasso), Char, (Kandinsky). Ambroise Vollard, Souvenirs sur Cézanne, reprodutions de tableaux inconnus de Cézanne [Recollections of Cézanne, reproductions of unknown paintings of Cézanne]. Paul Valéry, Réflexion sur le paysage et vien d'autres choses [Reflection on the Landscape and Other Things]. Antoine de Saint-Exupéry, Un mirage [A Mirage]. Jean Wahl, Art et perception [Art and Perception] C.-F. Ramuz, Ressemblance [Resemblance] Henry Charpentier, Préface à la Dernière Mode [Preface to the Latest Fashion] Stéphane Mallarmé, La Dernière Mode [The Last Fashion]. Léon-Paul Fargue, Pigcondre. Hans Bellmer, Poupée. Variations sur le montage d'une mineure articulée [Doll. Variations on the Assembling of an Articulated Minor]. Salvador Dalí, Apparition aérodynamique des Etres-Objets [Aerodynamic Apparition of Being-Objects]. Pierre Courthion, Le sadisme d'Urs Graf, Documents du Graphisches Kabinett de Bàle [The Sadism of Urs Graf, Documents of the Graphisches Kabinett of Basel]. D. Lotte Wolf, Révélations psychiques de la main. Avec seize reproductions en fac-similé des empreintes de mains d'écricvains et d'artistes contemporains [Psychic Revelations of the Hand. With sixteen facsimile reproductions of scriveners and contemporary artists' handprints]. André Breton, Phare de la nariée [Lighthouse of the Bride]. André Beaudin, Eaux-fortes pour l'illustration des Bucoliques de Virgile [Etchings for the Illustration of the Bucolics of Virgil]. Louise de Vilmorin, Ce soir [Tonight]. Charles-Henri Puech, Signification et représentation [Meaning and Representation]. Maurice Heine, Rétif de la Bretone et la femme féique [The Fairylike Woman]. Un monument gravé à la gloire du pied féminin. Louis Binet, fidèle illustrateur de fétichisme de Rétif [A Monument Engraved to the Glory of the Female Foot. Louis Binet, Faithful Illustrator of Fetishism of Rétif]. Élie Faure, Margaritas. E. Tériade, Réhabilitation du Chef-d'Oevuvre [Rehabilitation of the Masterpiece]. André Breton, La grande actualité poétique [The Great Poetic News], preface André Breton, poems by Breton, Péret, Éluard. Gisèle Prassinos, Contes et Poèmes [Tales and Poems]. Pierre-Jean Jouve, Poèmes. Benjamin Péret, Minute. Paul Éluard, Elle se fit élever palais [She Had Himself Raised Palace]. André Breton, L'air de l'eau [The Air of Water]. XXX, Cinq poèmes trop peu connus [Five Little Known Poems].

=== No. 7: June 10, 1935 ===
Cover by Joan Miró: E, Tériade, La peau de la peinture [The Skin of the Painting]. Man Ray, Portraits de femmes [Portraits of Women]. Roger Caillois, Mimétisme et psychasthénie légendaire [Mimicry and Legendary Psychasthenia]. Photographic documents by Le Charles. Henri Michaun, Un tout perit cheval [An All Perished Horse]. Jacques Baron, La manière blonde, Eaux-fortes de André Beaudin pour l'illustration des "Bucoliques" de Virgile [The Blonde Way, etchings by André Beaudin for the illustration of "Bucoliques" by Virgile]. Paul Eluard, Appliquée [Applied]. Illustrations by Bellmer and Man Ray. Maurice Raynal, Borès, Hors-texte en couleurs [Borès, color inset]. Maurice Heine, Nuits romantiques sous le Roi Soleil [Romantic Nights Under the Sun King]. Young, Le Jour est trop court [The Day is Too Short]. Young, Il n'est pas encore trop tard [It's Still Not Too Late]. Photography by Brassai and Man Ray. Georges Pudelko, Paolo Uccello. Jacques Delamain, Oiseux de nuit [Night Birds]. Photography by Fischer. André Breton, La nuit du tournesol [The Night of the Sunflower]. Photography by Brassai and Rogi André. Salvador Dalí, Psychologic non-euclidienne d'une photographie [Non-Euclidean Psychology of a Photograph]. A. Petitjean, Analyse spectrale du singe [Spectral Analysis of the Monkey]. Photography by Juliette Lasserre. Balthus, Illustrations pour "Wuthering Heights". Georges Lafourcade, Swinburne romancier ou "La Fille du Policeman" [Swinburne Novelist or "The Policeman's Daughter"]. Man Ray, Les portes tournantes [The Revolving Doors]. Herbert Read, Why the English have no taste. Paul Recht, Vue rétrospective sur 1937 [Retrospective View of 1937].

=== No. 8: June 15, 1936 ===
Cover by Salvador Dalí: Pierre Mabille, Notes sur le Symbolisme [Notes on Symbolism]. E. Tériade, La Peinture surréaliste [Surrealist Painting]. André Breton, D'une Décalcomanie sans objet préconcu (Décalcomanie du Désir) [Of a decalcomania without preconceived object (Decalcomania of Desire)]. Benjamin Péret, Entre Chien et Loup [Between Dog and Wolf]. Decalcomania Illustrations by Jacqueline Breton, Oscar Dominguez, Georges Hugnet, Marcel Jean, and Yves Tanguy. André Breton, Le Château Étoilé [Starry Castle]. Drawings by Max Ernst. Maurice Heine, Regards sur l'Enfer anthropoclasique [Perspectives on anthropoclastic Hell]. Salvador Dalí, Le Surréalisme spectral de l'Éternel Féminin préaphaélite [Spectral Surrealism of the Pre-Raphaelite Eternal Feminine]. Georges Bataille, Montserrat. Edward James, Trois sécheresses [Three Droughts]. Drawings by Salvador Dalí.

=== No. 9: October 15, 1936 ===
Cover by Henri Matisse: E. Tériade, Constance du fauvisme, Reproductions d'oeuvres récentes de Henri Matisse Hors-texte en couleurs: Nature morte de Henri Matisse [Constancy of Fauvism, Reproductions of recent works by Henri Matisse, Color inset: Still life of Henri Matisse]. Roger Caillois, Le complexe de Midi [The Midi Complex]. Maurice Raynal, Réalité et mythologie des Cranach, 17 reproductions d'oeuvres des Cranach [Reality and Mythology of Cranach, 17 reproductions of works of Cranach]. Hors-texte en couleurs: "le Massacre des Innocents" de Poussin [Color inset: "The Massacre of the Innocents" by Poussin]. Edward James, The Marvel of Minuteness, Color inset "Jane Seymour" by Hans Holbein. André Breton, Le Merveilleux contre le Mystére. A propos du symbolisme [The Marvelous Against the Mystery. About Symbolism]. 12 portraits of symbolist poets. Three watercolors by Picasso, 1 color inset. Lionello Venturi, Sur les derniéres années de Cézanne [On the Last Years of Cézanne], 16 unpublished reproductions of works by Cézanne. Jacques Prévert, Terres cuites de Béotie [Terracotta of Boeotia], 17 unpublished reproductions of Boeotian terracottas from the National Museum of Athens. Georges Duthuit, Edgar Degas chez Ambroise Vollard [Edgar Degas at Ambroise Vollard], 9 reproductions of the latest works of Degas. Audiberti, Naissance d'un homme [Birth of a man]. Maurice Heine, Martyres en taille douce [Engraved Martyrdoms], 8 reproductions of old engravings. Edward James, Le chapeau du Peuple [The People's Hat], 3 reproductions in color insets. Salvador Dalí, Première loi morphologique sur les poils dans les structures molles [First Morphological Law on Hair in Soft Structures]. Le Corbusier, Louis Sutter, l'inconnu de la soixantaine [Louis Sutter, the unknown in his sixties].

=== No. 10: December 1937 ===
Cover by René Magritte: Harold Muller, It's a Bird. André Breton, Têtes d'orage [Storm Heads]. Portraits by Lichtenberg, Grabbe, Brisset, Roussel, Kafka, Forneret. Xavier Forneret, Le diamant de l'herbe [The diamond of the grass], illustrations by Wolfgang Paalen. Franz Kafka, Odradek, illustrations by Max Ernst. J.-G. Posada, Bois [Wood] Benjamin Péret, La nature dévore le progrés et le dépasse [Nature Devours the Progress and Exceeds It]. Pierre Mabille, La conscience lumineuse [The Luminous Conscience]. Reproductions by Rob. Flud and Man Ray. Jean Lévy, Collages, comments by Gilbert Lély. Saisons, École française du XVII siécle [Seasons, French School of XVII Century]. Raoul Ubac, Le triomphe de la stérilité [The Triumph of Sterility]. Man Ray, Aurore des objets [Aurora of Objects]. Maurice Heine, Prodiges. Paul Eluard, Premiéres vues anciennes, Reproductions d'oeuvres d' [First Old Sights, Reproductions of works by] André Berton, G. de Chirico, Max Ernst, René Magritte, Joan Miró, Pablo Picasso, and Man Ray. Marcel Duchamp, Rendez-vous du 6 février 1916 [Appointment of February 6, 1916]. Le Surréalisme autour du monde. Reproduction du documents surréalistes [Surrealism Around the World. Reproduction of Surrealist Documents] Reproduction of works from Hans Arp, Hans Bellmer, Victor Brauner, Serge Brignoni, Cornell, Salvador Dalí, Paul Delvaux, Oscar Dominguez, Marcel Duchamp, Espinoza, Max Ernst, Georges Hugnet, René Magritte, Juan Miro, Henry Moore, Paul Nash, Wolfgang Paalen, Roland Penrose, Remedios Varo, Kurt Seligmann, J. Styrsky, and Yves Tanguy.

=== No. 11: May 15, 1938 ===
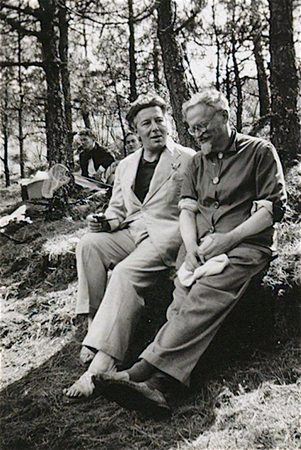
André Breton (left) traveled to Mexico in 1938 to participate in a conference on surrealism at the National Autonomous University of Mexico, where he met Leon Trotsky (right). Consequently, Minotaure No. 11 (1938) did not have an article by Breton, however No. 12/13 (1939) include Breton's Souvenir of Mexico, with photographs by Manuel Alvarez Bravo, as well as reproductions of paintings by Frida "Rivera".

Cover by Max Ernst: Pierre Mabille, Dessins inédits de Seurat [Unpublished drawings by Seurat]. Albert Béguin, L'Androgyne [The Androgynous]. Pierre Mabille, Miroirs: Photographies de Raoul Ubae [Mirrors: Photographs by Raoul Ubae]. Georges Pudelko, Piero de Cosimo, peintre bizarre [Piero de Cosimo, Bizarre Painter]. Jean Cazaux, Révolte et docilité dans l'invention poétique surréaliste [Revolt and Docility in Surrealist Poetic Invention]. Maurice Heine, Eritis sicut dii [You will be as Gods]. Georges Hugnet, Devinettes [Riddles]. Paul Recht, Botticcelli et la peste [Botticcelli and the Plague]. Jacques C. Brunius, Dans l'ombre où les regards se nouent [In the Shadow Where Eyes Are Tied]. Matta Echaurren, Mathématique sensible - Architecture du temps [Sensitive Mathematics, Architecture of Time]. Paul Eluard, Juste Milieu [The Middle Way]. Nicolas Calas, L'Amour de la Révolution à nos jours [The Love of the Revolution to Our Days]. Benjamin Péret, A l'intérieur de l'armure, Photographies de Raoul Ubac [Inside Armor, Photographs by Raoul Ubac]. Paul Recht, L'homme qui perd son ombre [The Man Who Loses His Shadow], photography by Brassai, after Jacques Berthier. Reproductions of drawings by André Masson and Georges Seurat. Paintings by Hans Arp, Max Ernst, Yves Tanguy, Wolfgang Paalen, Ecole de Botticelli, Piero di Cosimo, Bartolomeo Veneto.

=== No. 12-13: May 12, 1939 ===
Cover by André Masson, with inner cover by Diego Rivera: G. H. Lichtenberg, Liste d'une collection d'outils, destinés àêtre vendus aux enchères publiquea la maison de Sir H. S. la semaine prochaine. (Goettingue 1798) [List of a collection of tools, to be auctioned, published the house of Sir H. S. next week.] (Götting 1798). Translation and illustrations by Wolfgang Paalen. Color insert of a painting by Areimboldo. André Breton, Prestige d'André Masson [André Masson's Prestige]. André Breton, Des tendances les plus récentes de la peinture surréaliste [The Most Recent Tendencies in Surrealist Painting]. Color inserts: paintings by Chirico, Tanguy, Paalen, Ford, Mata, and Seligmann. Reproductions of paintings: Brauner, Dominguez, Frances, Frida Rivera, and Ubac. Pierre Courthion, Passage de Géricault [Passage of Géricault]. Madeleine Landsberg, Caspar David Friedrich, peintre de l'angoisse romantique [Caspar David Friedrich, Painter of Romantic Anxiety]. André Breton, Souvenir du Mexique [Souvenir of Mexico], Photography by Manuel Alvarez Bravo. Pierre Mabille, L'oeil du peintre [The Eye of the Painter]. Kurt Seligmann, Entretien avec un Tsimshian [Interview with a Tsimshian]. Benjamin Péret, Ruines: ruine des ruines [Ruins: Ruin of the Ruins]. La Rédaction, Le nationalisme dans l'art [Writing, Nationalism in Art]. Kurt Muller, Documents inédits sur le Comte de Lautréamont et son oeuvre [Unpublished Documents on the Count of Lautréamont and His Work]. Notes from the Editor. Maurice Heine, Maldoror et la Belle Dame [Maldoror and the Belle Dame]. Pierre Mabille, Le ciel de Lautréamont [The Sky of Lautréamont]. Docteur Pierre Menard, Analyse de l'écriture de Lautréamont [Analysis of Lautréamont's Writing]. Léon Corcuff, D'un procédé funéraire utile à la défense passive [From a Funeral Process Useful to the Passive Defense]. Jean Giono, Sur un trés grand livre [On a Great Book]. Bois originaux de Mailiol [Original Woods by Mailiol]

== See also ==
- Documents, a surrealist journal edited by Georges Bataille from 1929 to 1930
- Acéphale, a surrealist review created by Bataille, published from 1936 to 1939
- View, an American art magazine, primarily covering avant-garde and surrealist art, published from 1940 to 1947
- VVV, a New York journal published by émigré European surrealists from 1942 through 1944
