= Dakar-Djibouti Mission =

The Dakar-Djibouti Ethnographic and Linguistic Mission, often simply the Dakar-Djibouti Mission (French: La Mission Ethnographique et Linguistique Dakar-Djibouti) was a famous French anthropological expedition carried out in colonial Africa, under the direction of Marcel Griaule, from 1931 to 1933.

The colonial expedition was in large part an act that retrieved, sometimes by force or deception, cultural goods from African peoples. This led to a polemic between the project's organizer Griaule and the expedition's secretary, writer Michel Leiris who authored an autobiographical work about the project, L'Afrique fantôme (1934; English translation, African Phantom, 2017).

== Context ==
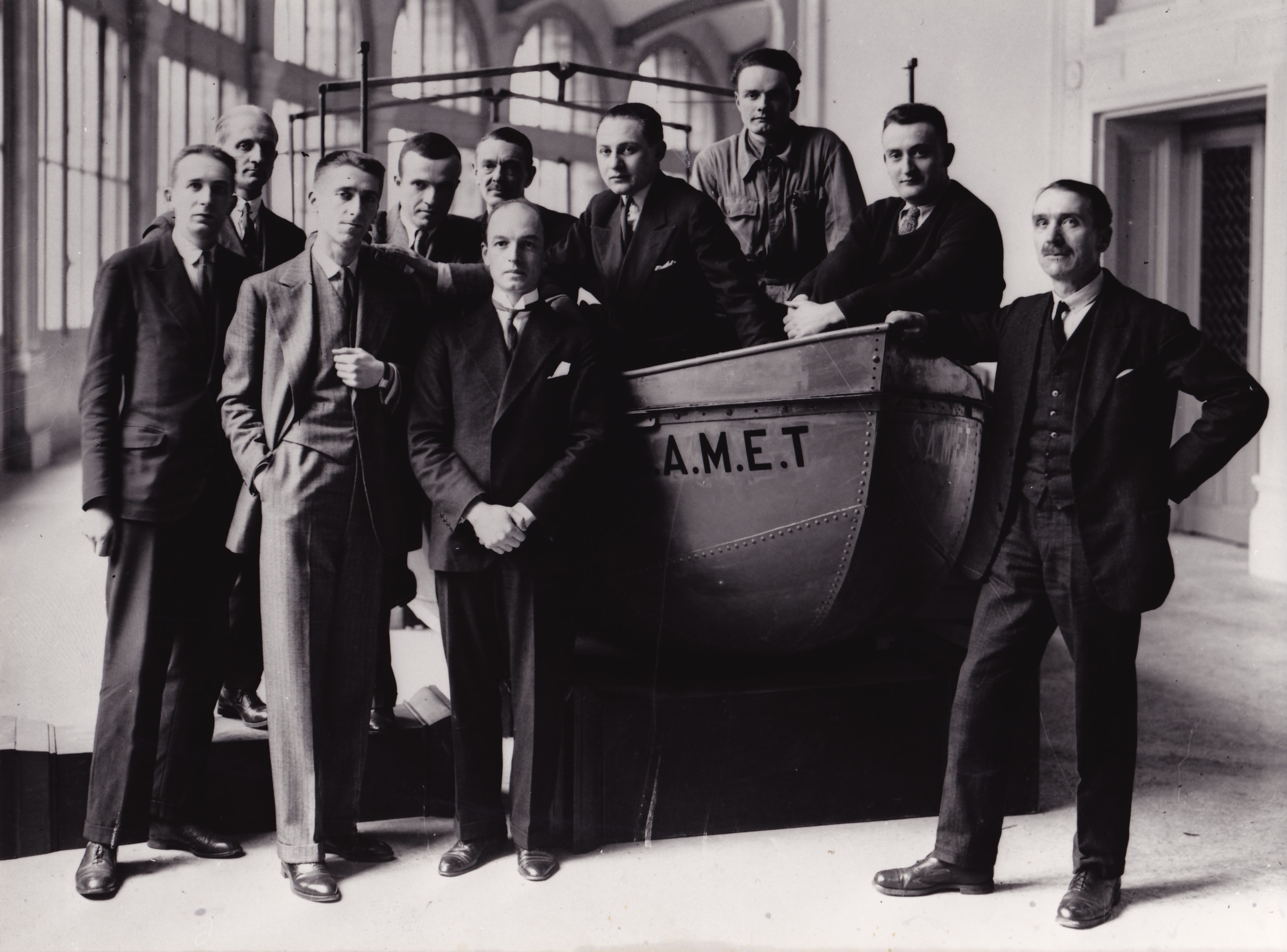
The members of the Dakar-Djibouti Mission in May 1931, at the Trocadero Ethnographic Museum. From left to right: André Schaeffner, Jean Mouchet, Georges Henri Rivière, Michel Leiris, Prince Michel Oukhtomsky, Marcel Griaule, Éric Lutten, Jean Moufle, Gaston-Louis Roux, and Marcel Larget.

From May 1930, Marcel Griaule proposed to the directors of the Institute of Ethnologie, Paul Rivet and Georges Henri Rivière, a mission from Dakar to Djibouti by way of Kayes, Bamako, Timbuktu, Ansongo, Niamey, Zinder, le Lake Chad, Fort Archambault (now Sarh), Bangui, Rejaf, Pays des Rivières, Khartoum, Rosières, le Lake Tana, and Addis Ababa. A law passed on 1 April 1931 created the Mission ethnographique et linguistique Dakar-Djibouti. Its official goal was to complete the collection of the Ethnographic Museum of the Trocadéro and thereby to create a scholarly showcase for colonization.

To finance the mission, the organizers addressed the French Parliament, who authorized a subvention of 700,000 francs, as well as scientific institutions and various private-sector patrons, among them perfume and soap manufacturers, to obtain objects of high value. The total budget rose to 1.3 million francs.

Among the members of the original research team, two were only briefly participants in the expedition: Jean Moufle withdrew on 29 October 1931 and prince Michel Oukhtomsky fell sick and was evacuated on 11 July 1931. Besides Marcel Griaule, the permanent members of the Mission were Michel Leiris, Éric Lutten (photographer and filmmaker), and Marcel Larget (logistics); they were joined by five members for parts of the expedition, André Schaeffner (musicologist), Deborah Lifchitz (linguist), Jean Mouchet (linguist), Gaston-Louis Roux (painter) and Abel Faivre (naturalist) (1901-1935),

He called for the team to traverse the African continent from west to east, from Sénégal toEthiopia, in order to be able to collect a maximum amount of ethnographic material and data.

To prepare for this collection, Michel Leiris redacted a document, Instructions sommaires pour les collecteurs d’objets ethnographiques (Summary Instructions for Collectors of Ethnographic Objects), ; which were inspired by the course of Marcel Mauss. These were used by members of the expedition and could also advise colonial administrators and any other person who might obtain ethnographic objects within their territories. One of the objects of the mission was to collect any everyday or ritual object that might testify to the cultures they encountered; assembling a collection of works of art was beside the point.

At the time, the collection of objects was a priority for ethnographic missions. Marcel Mauss, in his 1926 course at the Institute of Ethnology, insisted on this point, "It is extremely urgent to create collections. Everything is rapidly disappearing." This priority would disappear in the decades to follow, with descriptive sociology becoming the principal objective.

== The stages of the expedition ==
The mission embarked from Bordeaux, on 19 May aboard the steamboat Saint-Firmin. After a layover at Las Palmas (Canary Islands), on 26 May, it anchored at Port-Étienne (now Nouadhibou, in Mauritanie) on 28 May, and arrived to Dakar (Sénégal) on 31 May.

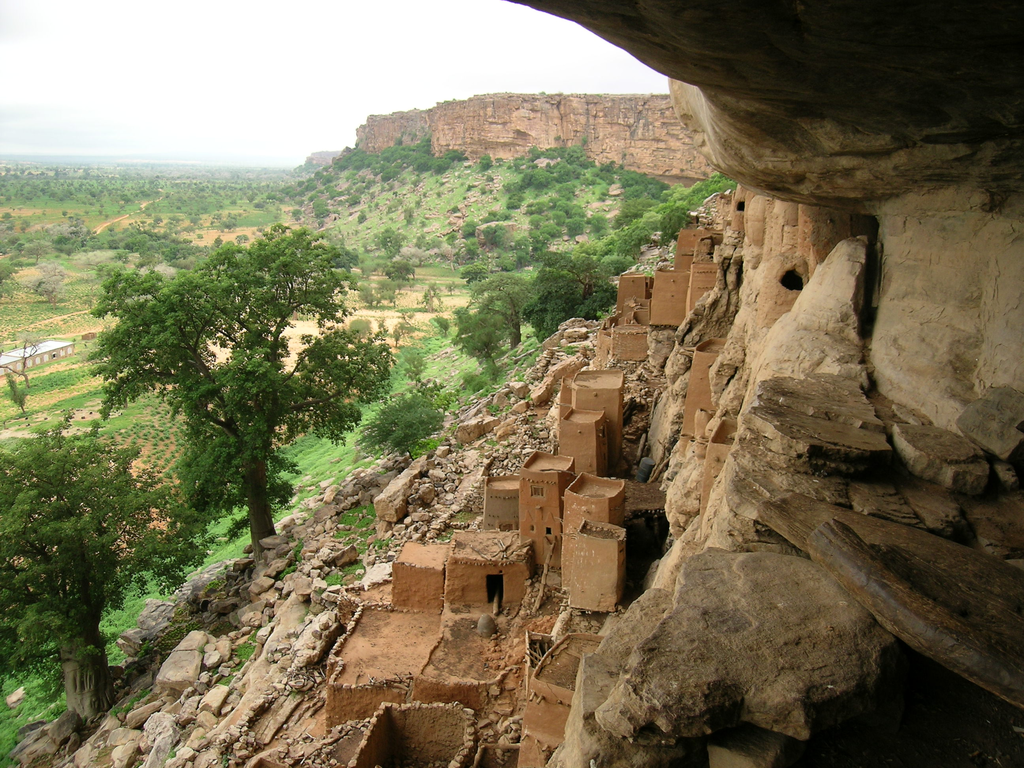
The Bandiagara Escarpment, in Mali, in Dogon country, where the Dakar-Djibouti Mission stopped at length.

- 31 May to 12 June 1931: Dakar.
  - 14 June: Tamba Counda
  - 27 June to 6 July: Kayes-Plateau
  - 14 July to 4 August: Kita
  - 4 to 27 August: Bamako
  - 21 September: Djenné
  - 10 and 25 September: Mopti
- 1931, 28 septembre : les Dogons de la falaise de Bandiagara au Soudan français (actuel Mali). Étape la plus célèbre, puisque Marcel Griaule en a fait par la suite son terrain d'étude privilégié. Revenu à trois reprises sur les lieux, il a entrepris de constituer un corpus de connaissance aussi complet que possible sur cette culture.
  - 30 novembre : Ouagadougou
  - 10 décembre : Abomey
  - 11 au 17 décembre : Porto-Novo
  - 21 au 26 décembre : Niamey
  - 29 décembre : Kano (Nigeria)
  - 31 décembre : Maydougoury
- 1932
  - 1 January: Mora
  - 12 January to 12 February: Garoua
  - 17 February to 2 March 1932: Yaoundé
  - 8 March 1932: Carnot (Oubangui-Chari)
  - 9 to 13 March 1932: Bangui
  - 25 March 1932: Buta (Belgian Congo)
  - 29 March 2026 to 9 April: Djouba (Anglo-Egyptian Sudan)
  - 18 April to 4 May: El-Gadarif
- 1932, 1 July: Gondar (Ethiopia). Second principal stage of the mission during which Michel Leiris led ethnographic research on possession among the Amharas (the rite of the zar,).
  - 31 December: Asmara (Italian Eritrea)
- 1933
  - 7 to 8 January: Massawa
  - 9 to 10 January: at sea on the cargo ship Volpi
  - 10 January: Djibouti (French Somaliland)
  - 19 January: Addis Ababa
- 1933, 30 January — Arrival: Djibouti.

The mission reached Marseille, after passage aboard the steamship D'Artagnan of the French merchannt line Messageries maritimes during 7 to 17 February 1933.
