= View (magazine) =

American literary and art magazine (1940–1947)

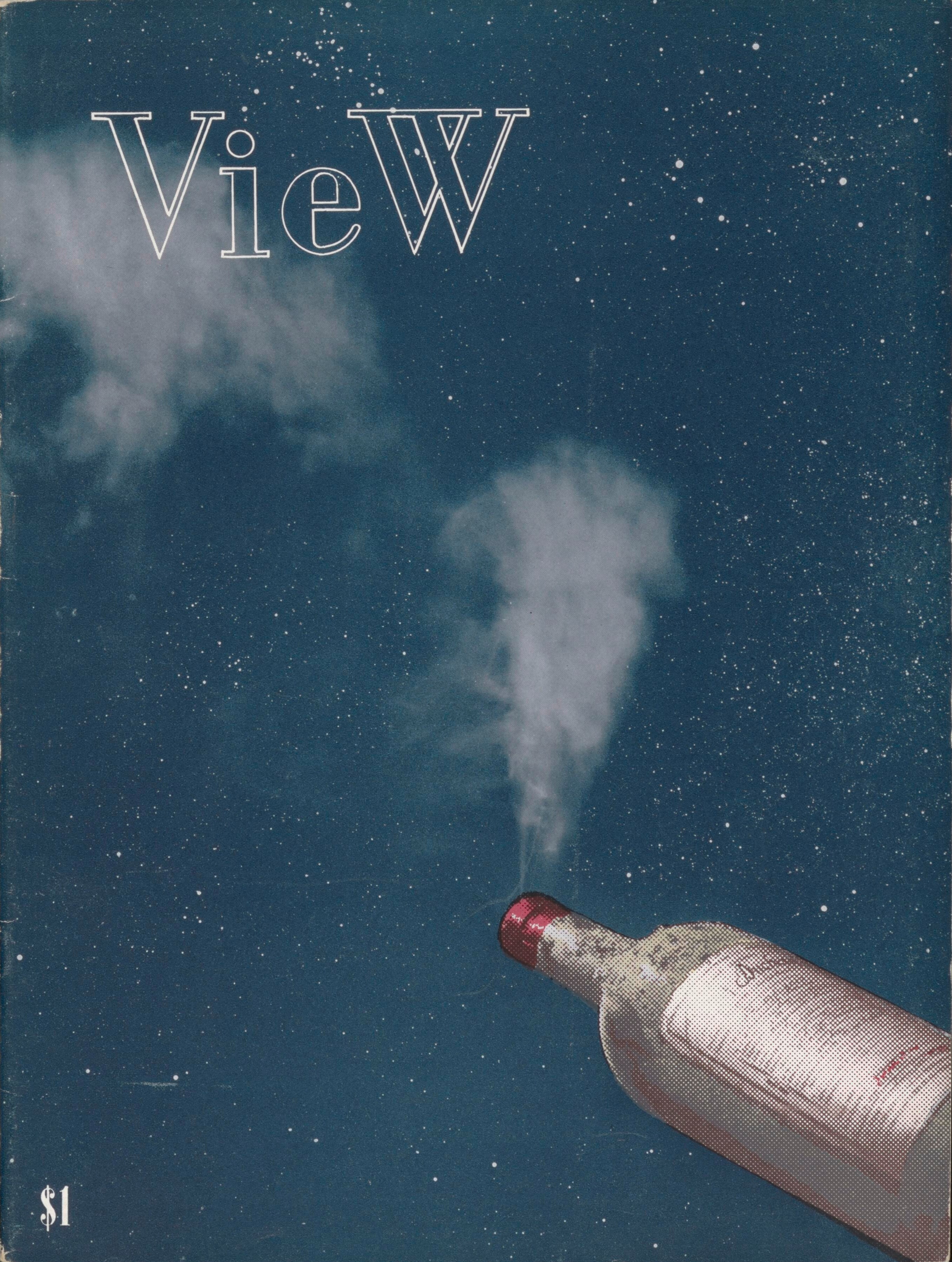
- March 1945 issue dedicated to Marcel Duchamp, with cover designed by the artist
- Language: English
- ISSN: 1050-6764

View was an American literary and art magazine published from 1940 to 1947 by artist and writer Charles Henri Ford, and writer and film critic Parker Tyler. The magazine is best known for introducing Surrealism to the American public. The magazine was headquartered in New York City.

The magazine covered the contemporary avant-garde and Surrealist scene, and was published quarterly as finances permitted until 1947. View featured cover designs by renowned artists with the highly stylised typography of Tyler along with their art, and the prose and poetry of the day.

Many of the contributors had been living in Europe, but took refuge in the U.S. during World War II bringing with them the avant-garde ideas of the time and precipitating a shift of the center of the art world from Paris to New York. It attracted contributions from writers like Wallace Stevens, an interview with whom was featured in the first number of View, William Carlos Williams, Joseph Cornell, Edouard Roditi, Henry Miller, Lawrence Durrell, Paul Bowles, Brion Gysin, Philip Lamantia, Paul Goodman, Marshall McLuhan, André Breton, Raymond Roussel, Albert Camus, Jean-Paul Sartre, Jean Genet or Jorge Luis Borges and artists like Pablo Picasso, Paul Klee, Fernand Léger, Georgia O'Keeffe, Man Ray, Joan Miró, Alexander Calder, Isamu Noguchi, Marc Chagall, René Magritte and Jean Dubuffet (Surrealism in Belgium, Dec. 1946). Max Ernst (April 1942), the Yves TanguyPavel Tchelitchew number with Nicolas Calas, Benjamin Péret, Kurt Seligmann, James Johnson Sweeney, Harold Rosenberg and Charles Henri Ford on Tanguy, Parker Tyler, Lincoln Kirstein and others on Tchelitchew (May 1942) and Marcel Duchamp, with an essay by André Breton, (March 1945) all got special numbers of the magazine. The earlier Surrealism special (View 7-8, 1941) had featured Artaud, Victor Brauner, Leonora Carrington, Marcel Duchamp and André Masson. There was an Americana Fantastica number (January 1943) and, edited by Paul Bowles the Tropical Americana issue on Mexico.

In the 1940s, View Editions, the associated publishing house, came out with the first monograph on Marcel Duchamp and the first book translations of André Breton's poems.

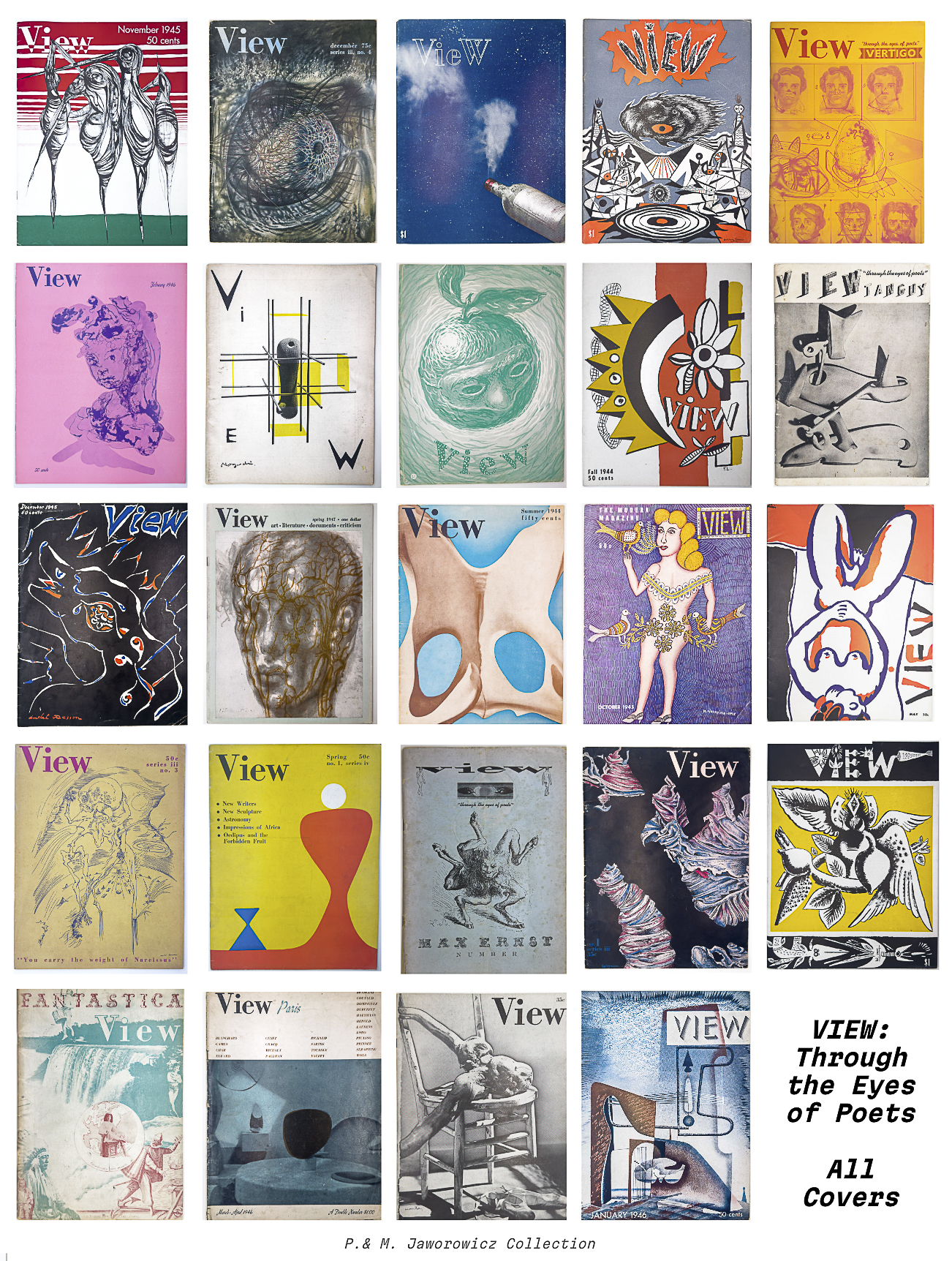
All covers of the View magazine (series II - VII)

== Full list of "View" magazine issues ==
=== Series 1 (tabloid format) ===
- Volume I, Issue 1, September 1940, opening article: "Poetry - the Only Hope of Drama" by H. R. Hays
- Volume I, Issue 2, October 1940, opening article: "Hollywood is Disguise" by Parker Tyler
- Volume I, Issue 3, November 1940, opening article: "Thoughts on Night Thoughts" by Nicolas Calas and Charles Henri Ford
- Volume I, Issue 4-5, December 1940 - January 1941, opening article: "Boston - San Francisco" by Forrest Anderson
- Volume I, Issue 6, June 1941, opening article: "Anti-Surrealist Dali" by Nicolas Calas
- Volume I, Issue 7-8, October-November 1941, opening article: "Interview with Andre Breton" by Nicolas Calas
- Volume I, Issue 9-10, December 1941 - January 1942, opening article: "The Destruction of the world" by Pierre Mabille
- Volume I, Issue 11-12, February-March 1942, opening article: "The Politics of Spirit" by Lionel Abel

=== Series 2 (magazine format) ===
- Volume II, Issue 1, April 1942, cover: Max Ernst
- Volume II, Issue 2, May 1942, covers: Yves Tanguy and Pavel Tchelitchew
- Volume II, Issue 3, October 1942 [Vertigo Issue] cover: Hanani Meller
- Volume II, Issue 4, January 1943 [Americana Fantastica] cover: Joseph Cornell

=== Series 3 (magazine format) ===
- Volume III, Issue 1, April 1943, cover: Kurt Seligmann
- Volume III, Issue 2, June 1943, cover: Man Ray
- Volume III, Issue 3, October 1943 [Narcissus Issue] cover: Andre Masson
- Volume III, Issue 4, December 1943, cover: Pavel Tchelitchew

=== Series 4 (magazine format) ===
- Volume IV, Issue 1, Spring (March) 1944, cover: Alexander Calder
- Volume IV, Issue 2, Summer (May) 1944, cover: Georgia O'Keeffe
- Volume IV, Issue 3, Fall (October) 1944, cover: Fernand Léger
- Volume IV, Issue 4, December 1944, cover: Esteban Frances

=== Series 5 (magazine format) ===
- Volume V, Issue 1, March 1945, cover: Marcel Duchamp
- Volume V, Issue 2, May 1945 [Tropical Americana Issue], cover: Wilfredo Lam
- Volume V, Issue 3, October 1945 [American Issue], cover: Morris Hirshfield
- Volume V, Issue 4, November 1945, cover: Leon Kelly
- Volume V, Issue 5, December 1945, cover: Andre Masson
- Volume V, Issue 6, January 1946, cover: John Tunnard

=== Series 6 (magazine format) ===
- Volume VI, Issue 1, February 1946 [View Italy], cover: Leonor Fini
- Volume VI, Issue 2 (numbers 2-3), March-April 1946 [View Paris], cover: Atelier Constantin Brancusi
- Volume VI, Issue 3, May 1946, cover: Jean Hélion

=== Series 7 (magazine format) ===
- Volume VII, Issue 1, Fall 1946, cover: Isamu Noguchi
- Volume VII, Issue 2, December 1946 [Surrealism in Belgium], cover: René Magritte
- Volume VII, Issue 3, Spring 1947, cover: Pavel Tchelitchew
- Volume VII, Issue 4, ? 1947, cover: Eugene Berman

== See also ==
- Acéphale, a surrealist review created by Georges Bataille, published from 1936 to 1939
- DYN, a journal founded and edited by Wolfgang Paalen in Mexico City, published from 1942 to 1944
- Documents, a surrealist journal edited by Georges Bataille from 1929 to 1930
- Minotaure, a primarily surrealist-oriented publication founded by Albert Skira, published in Paris from 1933 to 1939
- La Révolution surréaliste, a seminal Surrealist publication founded by André Breton, published in Paris from 1924 to 1929
- VVV - a New York journal published by émigré European surrealists from 1942 through 1944
