= Denise Paulme =

French ethnologist, anthropologist

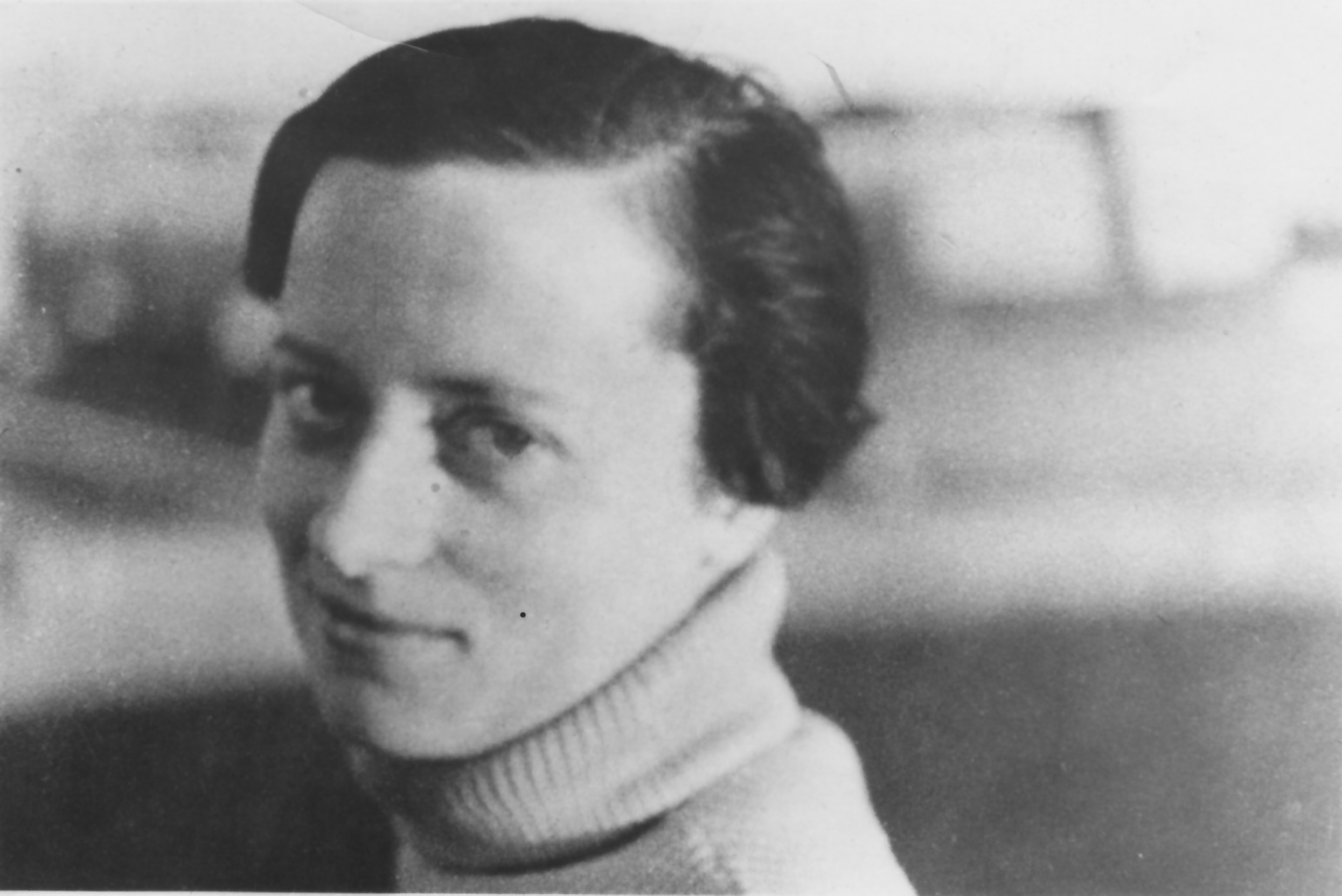
- Paulme in 1935
- Born: May 4, 1909; Paris, Ile-de-France, France
- Died: February 14, 1998 (aged 88); Paris, Ile-de-France, France
- Notable work: Organisation social des Dogon Femmes d'Afrique Noire

Denise Paulme (4 May 1909 – 14 February 1998) was a French Africanist and anthropologist. Her role in African literary studies, particularly in regards to the importance of Berber literature, was described as "pivotal".

== Career ==
Paulme initially studied law, and after a brief and unsatisfying stint as a secretary, went back to college in 1929 to finish her degree. She became interested in anthropology due to Marcel Mauss.

In 1932, she participated in the organization of the ethnographic museum of the Trocadero with Paul Rivet and Georges-Henri Rivière. She also worked as an assistant in the Museum of Man (Musée de l'Homme), an anthropological museum in Paris. In 1935, she started her first ethnographic experience, taking part a research project by Marcel Griaule. She spent nine months with the Dogon people in Sanga with Deborah Lifchitz. Ten years later, in 1945, she went to upper Guinea to observed rice farmers kissi with her husband André Schaeffner.

From 1938 to 1961, she was a member of the department of "Black Africa" of the ethnographic museum, where she met Michel Leiris. In 1957, with the support of Claude Lévi-Strauss she was appointed director of research (and taught anthropology) at the École pratique des hautes études in Paris. She finally became the responsible of the technical committee of Anthropology at the School for Advanced Studies in the Social Sciences in 1967.

== Organisation sociale des Dogon (Soudan français) ==
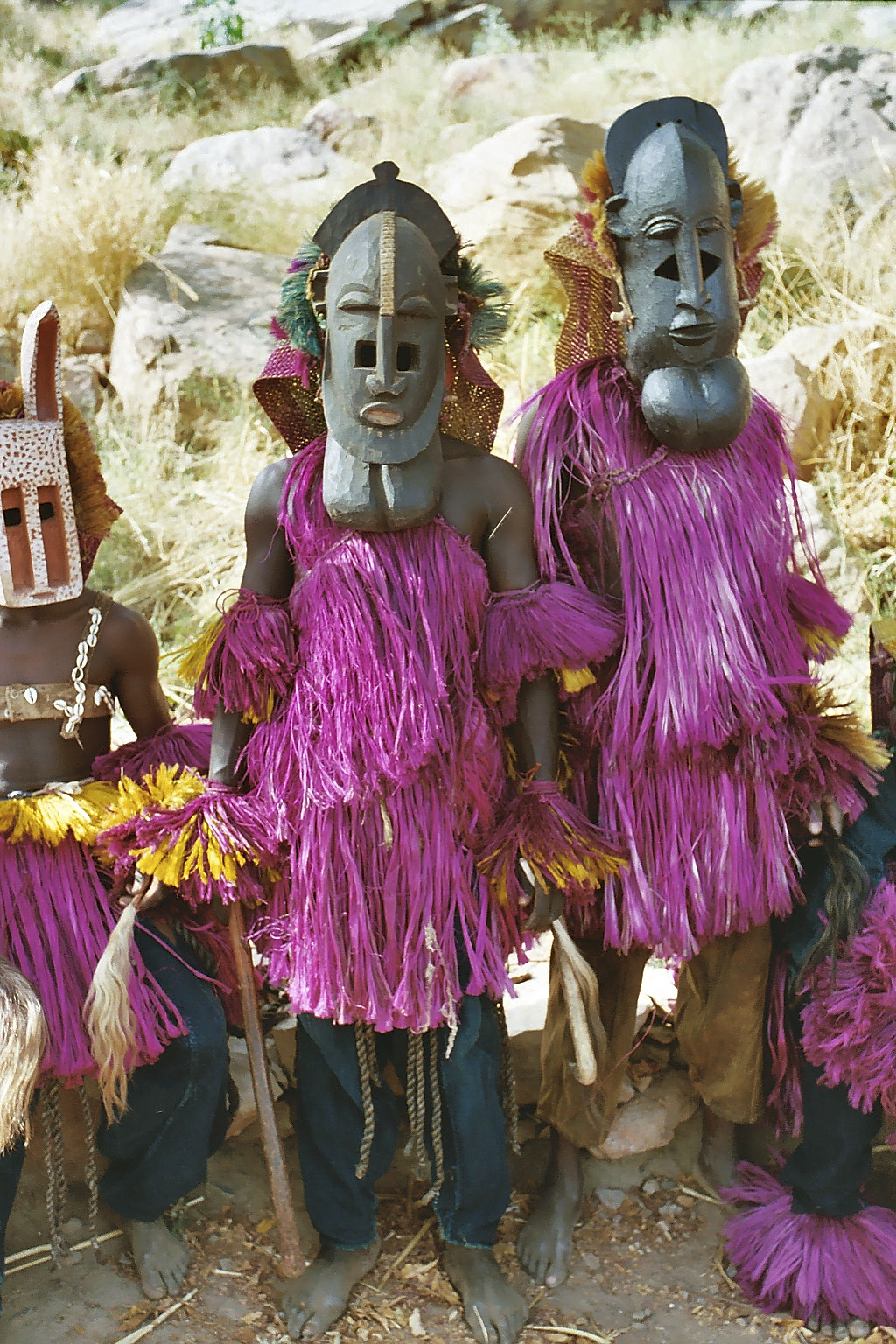
Dogon People

L'organisation sociale des Dogon (1940) is the first monographic book of Denise Paulme. She wrote it at the same period the World War II hence its success was not recognize. Nevertheless, in the 1960s, Georges Balandier quote it as a rare example of a balanced monography of social anthropology. Indeed, Denise Paulme presented this work as a dissertation of law, hence the book contains a very structured guideline. Despite the date of publication, Jean-Claude Muller recommend this book for every people who want to make a work of the Dogon People. There is also the monography of Jacky Bouju which deals with the economy of the Dogon which is interesting on the topic. Denise Paulme describe with subtlety the kindship of the dogon people, which also implied the role of women in this society. Subsequently, she regretted not having worked with women's point of view. Later, she wrote another work called Femmes d'Afrique noire (1960). During her first fieldwork, Denise Paulme made a very interesting methodological work by writing letters to Deborah Lifchitz. This correspondence is a tool to understand the reality of fieldwork and progress of reflexion. Indeed, by writing letters, the anthropologist made a real reflexive work which let us understand the reality of the search.

== Publications by Paulme ==
=== In English ===
- Women of Tropical Africa, Psychology Press, 1963 - 308 pages.
- African sculpture, Viking Press, 1962 - 160 pages.

=== In French ===
- Organisation sociale des Dogon (Soudan français), Paris, Domat-Montchrestien, 1940 (rééd. Jean-Michel Place, 1988).
- (éd.) Manuel d'ethnographie de Marcel Mauss, Paris, Payot, 1947.
- Les Gens du riz. Kissi de Haute-Guinée Française, Paris, Plon, 1954.
- (éd.), Femmes d’Afrique noire, Paris-La Haye, Mouton, 1960.
- Une société de Côte d’Ivoire hier et aujourd’hui. Les Bété, Paris-La Haye, Mouton, 1962.
- Les Sculptures de l'Afrique noire, Paris, Presses Universitaires de France, Paris, 1956.
- (éd.), Classes et associations d’âge en Afrique de l’Ouest, Paris, Plon, 1971.
- La Mère dévorante. Essai sur la morphologie des contes africains, Paris, Gallimard, 1976.
- La Statue du commandeur. Essais d’ethnologie, Paris, Le Sycomore, 1984.
- Lettres de Sanga à André Schaeffner, suivi des Lettres de Sanga de Deborah Lifchitz et Denise Paulme à Michel Leiris, Paris, Fourbis, 1992.
- Cendrillon en Afrique, Paris, Galaade éditions, 2007 (recueil posthume, préface de Françoise Héritier).
- Lettres de Sanga (avec Deborah Lifchitz), édition augmentée, présentée et annotée par Marianne Lemaire, Paris, CNRS Éditions, 2015.
