= Acéphale =

1936–39 French publication and secret society

André Masson's cover for the first issue of Acéphale. (1936).

Acéphale (French pronunciation: [asefal]) is the name of a public review created by Georges Bataille (which numbered five issues, from 1936 to 1939) and a secret society formed by Bataille and others who had sworn to keep silent. Its name is derived from the Greek ἀκέφαλος (akephalos, literally "headless").

== Acéphale, the review ==
Dated 24 June 1936, the first issue was only eight pages. The cover was illustrated by André Masson with a drawing openly inspired by Leonardo da Vinci's famous drawing of Vitruvian Man, who embodies classical reason. Masson's figure, however, is headless, his groin covered by a skull, and holds in his right hand a burning heart, while in his left he wields a dagger. In turn embodying the "reversed hermeticism in the form of parody" encompassing the "totality of Bataille's thought." Under the title Acéphale are printed the words Religion. Sociologie. Philosophie, followed on the next line by the expression the sacred conjuration (la conjuration sacrée). As recalled by Masson the drawing was "made on the spot, under the eyes of George Bataille" and it "had the good luck to please him."

The first article, signed by Bataille, is titled "The Sacred Conjuration" and claims that "Secretly or not... it is necessary to become different or else cease to be." Further on, Bataille wrote: "Human life is exasperated by having served as the head and reason of the universe. Insofar as it becomes this head and this reason, insofar as it becomes necessary to the universe, it accepts serfdom."

The second issue of the review begins with a large article titled "Nietzsche and Fascists", in which Bataille violently attacks Elisabeth Förster-Nietzsche, Nietzsche's sister, who had married the notorious antisemite Bernhard Förster – the wedding had led to a final rupture between Nietzsche and his sister. Bataille thereby called Elisabeth Elisabeth Judas-Förster, recalling Nietzsche's declaration: "To never frequent anyone who is involved in this bare-faced fraud concerning races."

The same issue contains an unedited text of Nietzsche on Heraclitus from Die Philosophie im tragischen Zeitalter der Griechen (Philosophy in the Tragic Age of the Greeks), as well as an article from Jean Wahl titled "Nietzsche and the Death of God," which is a commentary on a text from Karl Jaspers on Nietzsche.

The other issues also centered on Nietzsche. The last one, prepared but ultimately not published, was titled "Nietzsche's madness" (La folie de Nietzsche). These references to Nietzsche were directed against the philosopher's appropriation by Nazism – despite Nietzsche's opposition against antisemitism – as one of its seminal thinkers, leading to Nietzsche's unpopularity at the time in France.

Apart from Bataille, who signed most of the texts, Roger Caillois (issue 3 and 4), Pierre Klossowski (issue 1, 2, 3 and 4), André Masson, Jules Monnerot (issue 3 and 4), Jean Rollin and Jean Wahl (in the second issue) also participated in the review.

== The secret society ==
Because of its very nature, it is difficult to describe the society's acts. Bataille referred several times to Marcel Mauss who had studied secret societies in Africa, describing them as a "total social phenomenon". On this model, he organized several nocturnal meetings in the woods, near an oak which had been struck by lightning. Members of the Acéphale society were required to adopt several rituals, such as refusing to shake hands with antisemites and celebrating the decapitation of Louis XVI, an event which prefigured the "chiefless crowd" targeted by "acéphalité". Members of the society were also invited to meditation, on texts of Nietzsche, Freud, Sade and Mauss read during the assemblies. To psychologically prepare for the violence and losses that active duty in the French Resistance to Vichy–Nazi occupation of France would bring, members discussed carrying out a human sacrifice, but this was never carried out.

== The Encyclopaedia Da Costa ==
Acéphale also published Encyclopaedia Da Costa (Da Costa Encyclopédique), meant to coincide with the 1947 International Surrealist Exhibition in Paris, but due to printing delays, the Encyclopedia was not distributed until months after the exhibition ended. Modelled after the format of a conventional encyclopedia, it lambasted social and individual conventions with an unprecedented fervor, as well as putting forth more obscure ideas.

Perhaps its most insolent entry was the "License to Live", a faux governmental form requesting vital statistics from the bearer in order to enforce its legal fiat; the penalty for failing to keep the document "in order" was death. The license was likely an invention of Marcel Duchamp, typographer for the Encyclopaedia Da Costa, and was a gesture that had no obvious relationship to the art object as it is commonly known. A precursor to "License to Live" appears in an earlier note in Duchamp's Green Box, published in 1934 but written 20 years earlier, where he imagines a society in which people must pay for the air they breathe.

By the end of the century the encyclopedia fell into obscurity, partly because those who created it actively discouraged interested parties from procuring copies.

== See also ==
- Documents, a surrealist journal edited by Bataille from 1929 to 1930
- Minotaure, a primarily surrealist-oriented publication founded by Albert Skira, published in Paris from 1933 to 1939
- La Révolution surréaliste, a seminal Surrealist publication founded by André Breton, published in Paris from 1924 to 1929
- View, an American art magazine, primarily covering avant-garde and surrealist art, published from 1940 to 1947
- VVV, a New York journal published by émigré European surrealists from 1942 through 1944

== Bibliography ==
=== Texts from Georges Bataille ===
- L'apprenti Sorcier : Ce que j'ai à dire, éd. de la Différence, Paris, 1937
- Acéphale, réédition des numéros publiés et du numéro final non publié, éd. Jean-Michel Place, Paris, 1995
- L'Apprenti Sorcier (textes, lettres et documents (1932–1939) rassemblés, présentés et annotés par Marina Galletti), Éditions de la Différence, Paris, 1999
- The Sacred Conspiracy (The Internal Papers of the Secret Society of Acéphale and Lectures to the College of Sociology, edited by Marina Galletti and Alastair Brotchie), Atlas Press, London, 25 January 2018

=== Other references ===
- Maurice Blanchot, La communauté inavouable, Les Éditions de Minuit, Paris,
- Marcel Mauss, Manuel d'ethnographie, Petite bibliothèque Payot, Paris, 1967
- Michel Surya, Georges Bataille, la mort à l'œuvre, Gallimard, Paris, 1992
- L'unebévue, n° 16 : Les communautés électives, EPEL, 2000
- Stephan Moebius, Die Zauberlehrlinge. Soziologiegeschichte des Collège de Sociologie, Konstanz 2006.
