= Alphonse Pinart =

French anthropologist (1852–1911)

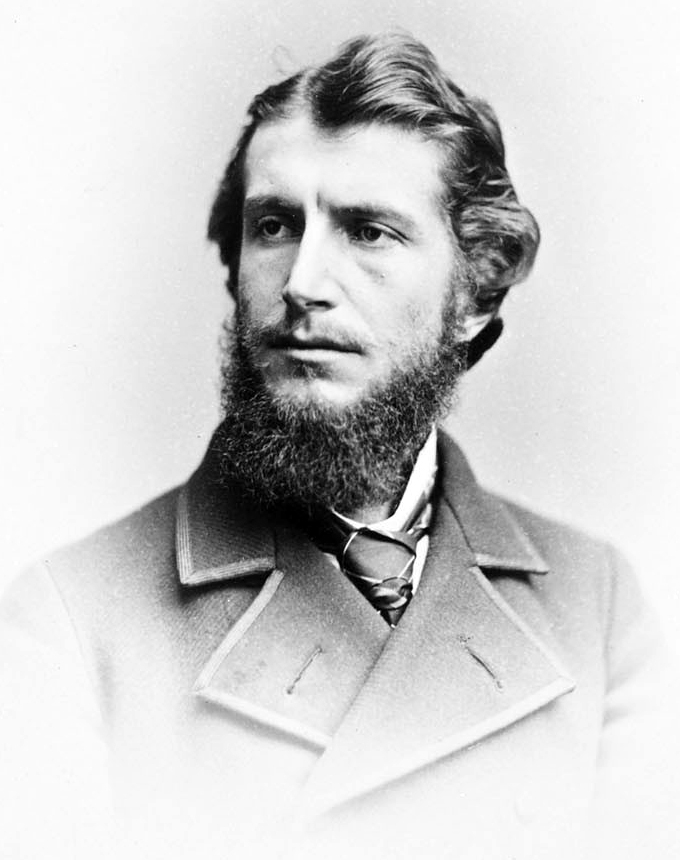
- Born: 26 February 1852; Boisdinghem, Marquise, Pas-de-Calais
- Died: 13 February 1911 (aged 58); Boulogne-sur-Mer
- Spouse: Zelia Nuttall

Alphonse Louis Pinart (26 February 1852 – 13 February 1911) was a French scholar, linguist, ethnologist, collector, and specialist on the American continent. He studied the civilizations of the New World in the manner of the pioneers of the time, mixing the empirical observation of anthropological, ethnological, and linguistic elements.

The son of a wealthy forge master, a learned young man who had learned English, Russian, and some Asian linguistics with Stanislas Julien, he was fascinated by the age of 15 for the question of the origin of the Amerindians and Inuit. He spent the fortune of his family and his two wives in the exploration of America and the purchase of objects and books related to his interests, which he made donations to many museums and collections, starting with the Ethnographic Museum of Trocadero, where he was the first donor, and the castle museum Boulogne-sur-Mer in his native region.

== Biography ==
The meeting of the Abbé Brasseur de Bourbourg at the International Exposition of 1867 in Paris decided Pinart's vocation. He conceived the project of going to Alaska to study native languages in order to prove the Siberian origin of the Amerindians; at the time, this idea had few supporters. He may also have been interested in archeology by the discovery in 1864 in Équihen, by workers of the family business, human skeletons, and antique objects. Another likely influence is anthropologist Ernest Hamy, a 10-year-old fellow, with whom Pinart would remain linked to. The latter, first curator of the Ethnographic Museum of Trocadero and director of scientific missions from 1880, would later appeal to him.

At 19, Pinart realized his project of travel at his expense; he resided from spring 1871 to spring 1872 in Alaska, a region that has just been acquired by the United States after nearly a century of Russian occupation, and made a visit to the Aleutian Islands. He returned to France with sixty masks from the Kodiak archipelago and eight others discovered in a burial cave Akhanh on the island of Unga (Aleutian Islands). According to S. Chauvet, his youth and energy allow him to perform sports such as the kayak trip from Unalaska to Kodiak, accompanied by several local natives, which facilitates the search for objects and impresses the locals.

Between 1873 and 1874, he traveled to Russia, namely Saint Petersburg and Moscow, but also to Copenhagen, Helsinki, and Tartu, to copy additional documentation on the peoples of the Bering Strait, partly for himself, in commissioned part of the American historian George Bancroft (1832–1918). He is one of the many assistants Bancroft relied on for writing his History of America. Pinart would build a collection of documents and manuscripts and bequeath to him personal documents.

Shortly after his return to France, he left for America. In 1875 and 1876, he visited Maine, Nova Scotia, Oregon, British Columbia, Washington State, and Arizona.

In the meantime, in 1875, he acquired from the antique dealer Eugene Boban a large collection of Mesoamerican coins. He knew his first financial problems because, besides the expenses of the expedition of 1871–1872, he bought a good part of the library of Brasseur de Bourbourg. In 1879, Eugene Boban complained of not having received all of his due and the funds wete missing to continue his explorations. Alphonse Pinart then negotiated with the Ministry of Education the financing of his expedition (granted 2 April 1878) jointly with Leon de Cessac, against the donation of his collection to the Museum of Ethnography Trocadero.

In 1874, Pinart received for his trip to Alaska and the Strait of Bering the Gold Medal for study tour, missions and reconnaissance works of the Geographical Society, and in 1875, a medal of the International Geographical Union at the Paris Congress. He would receive another in 1877 from the Acclimatization Society.

== Publications ==
- Caverne d'Aknañh, île d'Ounga (archipel Shumagin, Alaska). Paris, E. Leroux 1875
- Voyage à l'Ile de Pâques (Océan Pacifique) (Voyage to Easter Island) (in French; see External Link below for English translation)
- Pinart, Alphonse (1890). Vocabulario castellano-cuna. Paris: E. Leroux.
