= Éric Lutten =

Éric Lutten (2 September 1904 – 13 February 1975) was a French journalist, an important participant in the development of the French ethnology as well as the African press, a World War II hero and one of the earliest members of the French Explorators Society. He married four times and had three children by his fourth wife Marie-Josephe Jacqueline Lesdos.

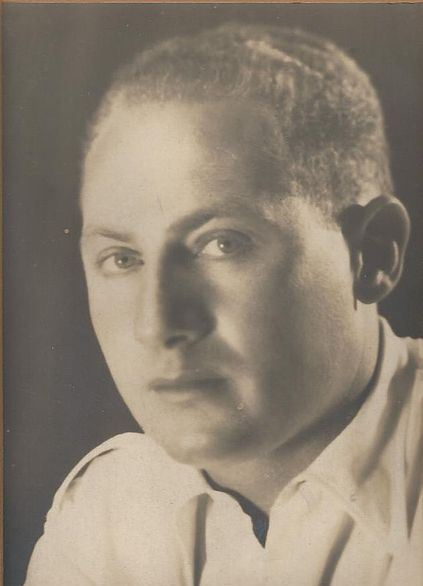
Eric Lutten

== Early life ==
Éric Lutten was born in Paris at 85 avenue d’Orléans (now avenue du Général-Leclerc) in the 14th arrondissement at the home of his parents, French-born Pauline Eugénie Aline Niboyet and German born Daniel Otto Lütten. Éric Lutten was the grandson of Jean Alexandre Paulin Niboyet, French diplomatic agent, literary man, writer and publisher of novels under the pen name Fortunio. His great-grandmother was feminist Eugénie Niboyet. He was the uncle of the Russian-American journalist and broadcaster Vladimir Pozner Jr. After obtaining his “brevet d’études generales” (equivalent to high school degree) in Switzerland, he pursued university studies in sciences and languages, remaining bilingual in French and English and speaking fluent German and Spanish for the rest of his life. He completed his military service in the cavalry in Paris.

== Career and accomplishments ==
Lutten spent most of his adult life in Africa. Starting as "agent de factorerie" (colonial business manager) for the Compagnie française de l’Afrique occidentale (Occidental Africa French Company) or CFAO from April 1926 to June 1927, he joined the Société d’entreprises africaines (African Enterprises Society) from June 1927 to September 1929.

=== Ethnographic Museum of the Trocadéro period ===
Lutten is known for his work for the Ethnographic Museum of the Trocadero Musée d'Ethnographie du Trocadéro from October 1930 to July 1935 and in particular his participation in two major research expeditions: Mission Dakar-Djibouti from 1931 to 1933, the most important French ethnographic expedition that crossed Africa from West to East, and Sahara Soudan (January to April 1935).

His responsibilities:

- Mission Dakar-Djibouti– logistics (transport, equipment), photography, cinematography, indigenous people and caravans, inquiries into indigenous people's techniques and their co-occurring rituals. The contributions of this mission to the field of ethnography are major, including the collection of African objects now exhibited in the new Musée du quai Branly – Jacques Chirac, photographs, films, and collections of traditions and songs.
- Mission Sahara-Soudan - (driver of the «Kanaga» truck; development of photographs, technology studies and grottoes artwork excavation)

Lutten's research themes included:

- « The "wasamba" and their use of the circumcision », Minotaure, no 2, 1931, p. 13–17
- « Black children also have dolls », Le monde colonial illustré, no 129, mai 1934, p. 79
- « Occidental Africa dolls », American Anthropologist (Journal de l'Association américaine d'anthropologie), vol. 36, no 4, décembre 1934, p. 619-625

Between these two ethnographical missions, he collaborated on publications from the Dakar-Djibouti mission and the organization of the Africa department of the Trocadéro Ethnographic Museum. He was curator of the Sahara exhibit that took place from 15 May to 28 October 1934.

Éric Lutten helped leading French ethnologist and explorer Paul-Émile Victor in the organization of the polar expedition by Jean-Baptiste Charcot on the Pourquoi Pas ship.

=== Later Period ===
After his work for the Ethnographic Museum of the Trocadéro, Lutten's career revolved around two areas: Management and research for French businesses in Africa and Journalism and contributions to the African press.

He participated in the launch of Ivory Coast Abidjan Fraternité Matin in 1958–1959. He was correspondent in Conakry, French Guinea, for the Associated Press and responsible for the local journal Guinee Matin. He was journalist and editor for the Journal de Tanger in Morocco from 1959 to his retirement in 1972. During this period as a correspondent for the Associated Press, he was the first journalist on site to send pictures of the earthquake that took place in Agadir on 29 February 1960, the most lethal in Morocco's history.

=== African Museum of Ile d’Aix ===
Lutten acted as an advisor during the creation of the African Museum of Ile d’Aix (now a National Museum Musée africain de l'Ile d'Aix) with the souvenirs brought back from Africa by Napoléon Gourgaud, grandson of Général Gourgaud (military companion of Napoleon in Saint Helena).

=== World War II ===
Having joined the French forces in Africa, Éric Lutten is known for his role as a French Military Liaison (1st class) attached to the Seventh United States Army, 6th Corps, 103rd Infantry Division, where he contributed on 5 May 1945 to the liberation of Château d’Itter in Austria where many French dignitaries, including former French Presidents, generals, and the sister of Général de Gaulle were held as hostages.

On 16 November 1944, he entered the city of Saint-Dié-des-Vosges, occupied by the enemy, to contact local resistance members and assess the city's supply needs, ensuring the first supply before U.S. troops were in the city, and providing in the process valuable intelligence to the Allied Command.

He received the Bronze Star on 22 November 1954 for «meritorious achievement in ground operations against the enemy; European Theater of Operations, 9 November 1944 – 12 March 1945».

== Sources ==
- French National Library. International identifier : ISNI 0000 0000 7123 3777
- National French Archives - Quai Branly Museem.
- Marcel-Griaule Fund, Library Éric-de-Dampierre, MAE, Paris West University Nanterre La Défense , France
- National Scientific Research Center CNRS – Institute of African Studies
- French Explorators Society
- « The Last Battle: When U.S. and German Soldiers Joined Forces in the Waning Hours of World War II in Europe«, published by DaCapo Press 7 May 2013, New York Times bestseller, preceded by the article “The Battle for Castle Itter” published in World War II magazine
