= Rosemarie Beck =

American painter (1923–2003)

- Born: July 8, 1923; Westchester, New York, U.S.
- Died: July 15, 2003 (aged 80); New York City, U.S.
- Known for: Painting
- Movement: Abstract expressionism
- Spouse: Robert Phelps

Rosemarie Beck (July 8, 1923 – July 15, 2003) was an American abstract expressionist, figurative expressionist painter in the post-World War II era. She was married to the writer and editor Robert Phelps.

== Education and early life ==
A 1944 graduate of Oberlin College with a bachelor's degree in art history, Beck later studied at Columbia University, the Art Students League in New York, The Institute of Fine Arts at New York University, and in workshops with well-known artists Kurt Seligmann and Robert Motherwell. Shortly after graduating from Oberlin in 1944, she moved to Woodstock, N.Y., where she struck up friendships with neighbors Philip Guston and Bradley Walker Tomlin, artists who had an influence on her early work.

== Career ==
In the early part of her career, she was regarded as a member of the second generation of the New York School of abstract expressionists and her work was often exhibited at their annual shows at the Stable and Peridot galleries.

Early in her career, Beck considered herself to be an abstract expressionist painter, but by the late 1950s, she had switched to the figurative focus that she would retain for the rest of her career.

Beck became “one of the few painters of our time to treat grand themes in ambitious multi-figure compositions while satisfying a need both for abstract structure and for an execution that embodies energy without being gratuitous,” according to critic Martica Sawin.

Beck taught at Queens College of New York, Vassar College, Middlebury College, the Vermont Studio Center, and the New York Studio School of Drawing, Painting and Sculpture, where she was on the faculty until shortly before she died.

== Public collections ==
- Two Women, ca. 1960-1965, Smithsonian American Art Museum, Washington, D.C.
- The Art Center. Vassar College. Poughkeepsie, NY
- Fine Art Museum, Western Carolina University, Cullowhee, NC
- Bryn Mawr College, Bryn Mawr, PA
- Corcoran Gallery of Art. Washington, DC
- The Corporation of Yaddo, New York, NY
- The Hirshhom Museum, Smithsonian Institution, Washington, DC
- Hood Museum of Art, Dartmouth College, Hanover, NH
- The McCoy Institute
- Museum of Art, Middlebury College, Middlebury, VT
- National Academy of Design, New York, NY
- The Neuberger Museum, SUNY Purchase, Purchase, NY
- Trenton Museum
- The University of Nebraska
- Queens College Art Center, Flushing, NY
- Smith College Museum of Art, Northampton, MA
- Weatherspoon Art Museum, University of North Carolina, Greensboro, NC
- Whitney Museum of American Art. New York, NY

== Solo exhibitions ==
- 2015 "Lyric Truth" (3 venue retrospective), Portland State University, Portland, OR
- 2013 "Le Maquillage & Magdalen," Steven Harvey Fine Art Projects, New York, NY
- 2013 "Rosemarie Beck: Paintings from the 60s," The National Arts Club, New York, NY
- 2012 "Rosemarie Beck: Embroidered Mythologies," Lori Bookstein Fine Art, New York, NY
- 2007 Rosemarie Beck: Abstraction into Figuration, Paintings 1952-1965, Lori Bookstein Fine Art, New York, NY
- 2003 Belk Gallery, Western Carolina University, Cullowhee, NC; Rider University Art Gallery, Rider University, Lawrenceville, NJ
- 2002 University Galleries, Wright State University, Dayton, OH
- 1999 Retrospective Exhibition, Queens College, NY
- 1992 Dartmouth College, Hanover, NH
- 1989 Ingber Gallery, New York, NY
- 1985 New York Museum Annex, Brooklyn, NY
- 1980 Cornell University, Ithaca, NY
- 1979 Middlebury College, Middlebury, VT
- 1972 Peridot-Washburn Gallery, NY
- 1971 Zachary Waller Gallery, Los Angeles, CA; Duke University Museum, Chapel Hill, NC
- 1962 State University at New Paltz, NY
- 1960 Wesleyan University, Middletown, CT (12 year retrospective)
- 1961 Vassar College, Poughkeepsie, NY
- 1957 Vassar College Art Gallery, Poughkeepsie, NY
- 1948 Woodstock Artists Association, Maverick Concert Hall, Woodstock, NY
- 1944 Allen Art Museum, Oberlin, OH
