= Boisdinghem =

- Commune
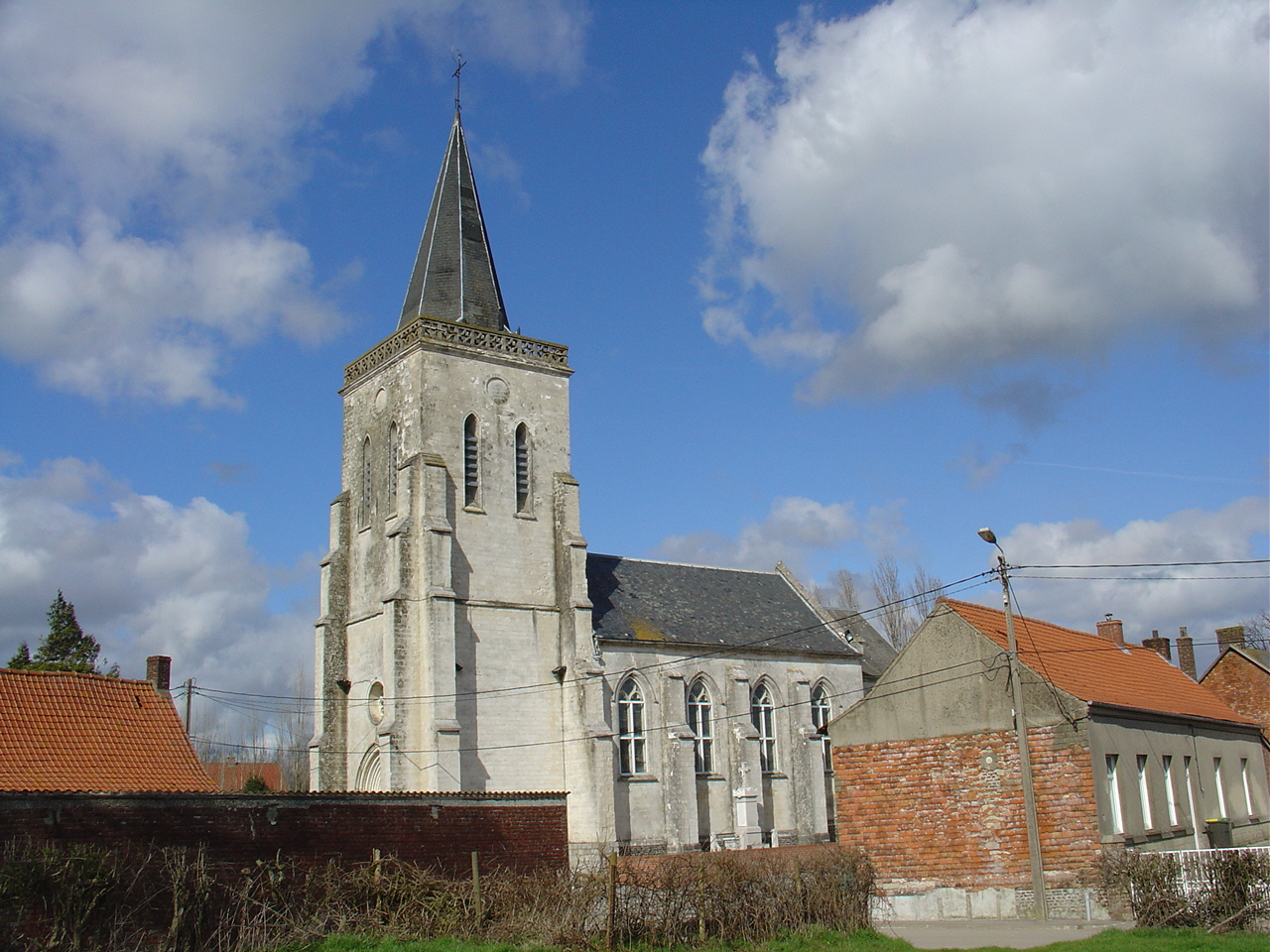
- The church of Boisdinghem

- Coat of arms
- Location of Boisdinghem
- Location within France Location within Hauts-de-France
- Coordinates: 50°44′58″N 2°05′41″E
- Country: France
- Region: Hauts-de-France
- Department: Pas-de-Calais
- Arrondissement: Saint-Omer
- Canton: Lumbres
- Intercommunality: Pays de Lumbres

Government
  - Mayor (2020–2026): Michel Lheureux
- Area^{1}: 3.13 km^{2} (1.21 sq mi)
- Elevation: 166 m (545 ft)
- Highest elevation: 167 m (548 ft)
- Lowest elevation: 104 m (341 ft)
- Population (2023): 260
  - Density: 83/km^{2} (220/sq mi)
- Time zone: UTC+01:00 (CET)
  - Summer (DST): UTC+02:00 (CEST)
- INSEE/Postal code: 62149 /62500
- ^{1} French Land Register data, which excludes lakes, ponds, glaciers > 1 km^{2} (0.386 sq mi or 247 acres) and river estuaries.

Boisdinghem (French pronunciation: [bwadɛ̃ɡɑ̃]; Picard: Bodinghin; Dutch: Bodingem) is a commune in the Pas-de-Calais department in the Hauts-de-France region in northern France.

== Geography ==
A small village situated 5 miles (8 km) west of Saint-Omer, on the D206 road.

== Population ==
Historical population
Year	Pop.	±% p.a.
1968	149	—
1975	141	−0.79%
1982	158	+1.64%
1990	176	+1.36%
1999	191	+0.91%
2007	214	+1.43%
2012	242	+2.49%
2017	249	+0.57%
2023	260	+0.72%
Source: INSEE

== Sights ==
- The church of St. Omer, dating from the seventeenth century

== Notable residents ==
- Alphonse Pinart (1852-1911), explorer, philologist, and ethnographer

== See also ==
- Communes of the Pas-de-Calais department
