= Suzanne Roger =

- Born: Suzanne Marcelle Roger; 28 April 1898; Paris, France
- Died: 3 January 1986 (aged 87); Paris, France
- Known for: Painting

Suzanne Roger was a figurative woman painter born on April 28, 1898, in Paris and deceased in the same city on January 3, 1986.

Suzanne Roger was born in a family of scholars, her father Maurice Roger was a teacher at the Parisian Lycée Carnot. She attended the art school Académie Ranson with Paul Sérusier and Maurice Denis as teachers. She married in December 1919 in Paris the painter André Beaudin and they shared a common studio in the Square de Clignancourt in Paris.

Since 1923 and until her death she had been supported by the Galerie Simon of Daniel-Henry Kahnweiler which has later become the Galerie Louise Leiris. In 1923 she created a series of lithographs for the art book La Couronne de Vulcain by Max Jacob.

In the 1920s she was a regular attendant of the “Dimanches de Boulogne” meetings in Kahnweiler's house. From 1924 to 1929, she created a series of paintings depicting cylindrical figures inspired by African art, les tableaux noirs. She is remarked by the critic Maurice Raynal in his Anthologie de la peinture en France de 1906 à nos jours (1927).

During the French Occupation she participated in the avant-garde exhibition Vingt jeunes peintres de tradition française.

After WW2, she created a series of mosaics adorning public buildings.

== Exhibitions ==
- Galerie Simon : 1923, 1926, 1935
- Galerie Louise Leiris : 1946, 1952, 1958, 1969, 1979, 1986, 1998
- Galerie Joan Gaspar, Barcelone : 2004
