= Kurt Seligmann =

Swiss-American Surrealist painter (1900–1962)

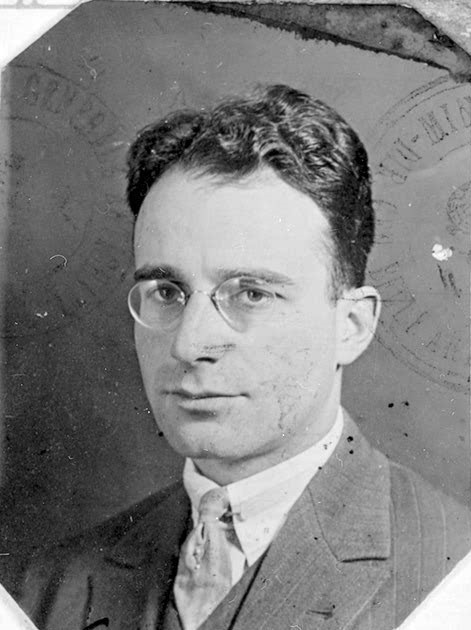
- Kurt Seligmann, pictured in an Italian museum passport, 1927
- Born: Kurt Leopold Seligmann; 20 July 1900; Basel, Switzerland
- Died: 2 January 1962 (aged 61); Sugar Loaf, New York, USA
- Resting place: Seligmann estate in Sugar Loaf
- Education: École Supérieure des Beaux-Arts (Geneva), Accademia di Belle Arti (Florence)
- Known for: Fantastic imagery of medieval troubadors and knights engaged in macabre rituals
- Movement: Surrealism
- Spouse: Arlette Paraf

Kurt Leopold Seligmann (20 July 1900, Basel – 2 January 1962, Sugar Loaf) was a Swiss-American Surrealist painter, engraver, and occultist. He was known for his fantastic imagery of medieval troubadors and knights in macabre rituals and inspired by the carnival held annually in his native Basel, Switzerland. He was extremely influential within the Surrealist movement in Paris and particularly in the United States.

== Early life and education ==
Seligmann was born on 20 July 1900 in Basel, Switzerland into a Jewish family. He was the son of furniture dealer Gustav Seligmann and his wife Helene Guggenheim, a relative of Peggy Guggenheim. He had an older sister, Marguerite.

As a teenager, he worked in a print shop where he hand-colored glass lantern slides. He also took art classes with Ernst Büchner and Eugen Ammann. Though his parents did not initially support his desire to be an artist, they eventually relented and he began studying at the École Supérieure des Beaux-Arts in Geneva in 1919. There, he became friends with Pierre Courthion and Alberto Giacometti. In 1920, however, he returned to Basel to work in his parents' furniture shop after his father fell ill. In 1927, he again left Basel, this time to attend the Accademia di Belle Arti in Florence.

== Career ==
=== Paris ===
Seligmann left for Paris in 1929, where he reunited with Giacometti and Courthion. That year, he published Le monde au temps des surréalistes (The World in the Age of Surrealists). Over the course of his ten years in Paris, he made a number of friends, including Wolfgang Paalen, Yves Tanguy, Kay Sage, and Swiss artists Serge Brignoni and Gérard Vulliamy. Seligmann put together a portfolio to impress Jean Arp and André Breton, two eminent Surrealists. Courthion wrote a positive review of his work in the journal Cahiers de Belgiques and Arp subsequently invited him first to his studio, then to join the group Abstraction-Création. Seligmann served on the executive board, as secretary, and finally as president Auguste Herbin's "right hand man" until the organization's dissolution in 1936.

Seligmann's first group exhibition was at the Salon des Surindépendants in Paris in October 1930. Arp introduced him to Jeanne Bucher, who hosted Seligmann's first solo exhibition at his gallery in February 1932. Around this time, he and Tarō Okamoto tried to introduce the neo-concreteism to Paris but were not successful. He also joined Gruppe 33, an anti-fascist artist's organization based in Basel. In 1937, he was accepted as a member to the Surrealist movement by Breton, a collector of his work. Hans Bellmer, Jacques Hérold, Óscar Domínguez, and Richard Oelze were others in his class of inductees; he then met existing members Jean Hélion and Alberto Magnelli. During his half-year honeymoon in 1936, Seligmann visited French Tahiti, which kicked off Seligmann's interest in Indigenous art. He visited Alaska and British Columbia in 1938 to collect American ethnographic art for the Musée de l'Homme and spent much of his time looking at tribal art, causing him to develop a particular interest in totems. For the museum's display, he purchased the Kʼëgit totem pole from the Hagwilget village.

=== New York ===
Following Germany's Invasion of Poland in 1939, Seligmann and his wife left France for New York City. He was the first Surrealist to escape Europe and aided other artists in Paris in emigrating. The correspondence he maintained during this period is preserved in a collection at the Beinecke Rare Book & Manuscript Library at Yale University. His first exhibition in the United States was at the Karl Nierendorf Gallery and came just two and a half weeks after his arrival.

While his work in the 1930s was more baroque, Seligmann leaned heavily into the incorporation of magic, myth, and the occult during his exile in the 1940s. During this time, he frequently wrote for View and VVV. In 1942, his relationship with Breton soured and quickly ended after Seligmann disputed Breton's knowledge of Tarot during a Surrealist meeting. He was subsequently expelled from the group and Breton blocked him from taking part in a major Surrealist exhibition at D'Arcy Galleries. Regardless, he had already established himself well enough in New York and among his fellow Surrealists that it did not have a major impact on his career or personal life. In 1944, he produced a limited edition set of etchings illustrating the myth of Oedipus in collaboration with friend and art historian Meyer Schapiro. In 1947, he published Magic, Supernaturalism and Religion with Pantheon Books; this was updated and republished in 1972 after his death. This was followed the next year by his 500-page The Mirror of Magic, which he wrote and illustrated.

Seligmann taught at Briarcliff Junior College and The New School for Social Research, but spent nearly a decade (1953–1962) as part of the Brooklyn College faculty. Among his students were Rosemarie Beck, Robert Motherwell, and Alan Vega. He also taught summer courses in graphic techniques from his farm in Sugar Loaf and designed sets for dance and ballet groups.

Seligmann had a nonfatal heart attack in March 1958, preventing him from visiting Europe as planned. He gave up his Bryant Park studio and Manhattan apartment by 1960, apprehensive about his health and refusing to drive out of fear of having another heart attack, and spent the next two years painting and gardening on his Sugar Loaf farm.

== Personal life ==
Seligmann dated English painter Ivy Langton for a time starting in 1932 before meeting Arlette Paraf during a summer trip to Geneva in 1935. They married in Paris on 25 November 1935. Sources vary in whether she was the niece or granddaughter of Georges Wildenstein but she was certainly related. In New York, the couple lived in the Beaux-Arts Building in Manhattan beginning in 1940. They later acquired a 55-acre (220,000 m^{2}) dairy farm in Sugar Loaf in northern New York at the suggestion of Meyer Schapiro's brother-in-law. They kept geese, turkeys, and long-haired cows, though they largely used the farm to entertain guests. Seligmann turned the barn into a studio and had an etching press installed. Seligmann and his wife kept a home in Villa Seurat in Paris but visited infrequently. They often rented it out to European painters such as Wolfgang Paalen and Isamu Noguchi. The couple traveled to Paris for a final time in 1949.

The Seligmanns became naturalized American citizens in 1951 and retired to the Sugar Loaf farm in 1960. He collected rare books on the occult. On the morning of 2 January 1962, while shooting at rats stealing birdseed from his yard, Seligmann slipped on ice and accidentally shot himself in the head, fatally. Shortly before her 1992 death, his wife bequeathed the entire Seligmann estate to the Orange County Citizens Foundation, a nonprofit dedicated to preserving Orange County, New York. Both are buried on the property.

The foundation is now based on the Seligmann farm. The copyright representative for the Foundation and Seligmann's estate is the Artists Rights Society. The house also contains the Orange County Land Trust and the Seligmann Center for the Arts, and hosts film screenings, live performances, and art exhibitions.
