= Pierre Courthion =

Swiss art critic and historian

Pierre Courthion (January 14, 1902 - 1988) was a Swiss art critic and historian known for his work on American and French art.

== Biography ==
Courthion's father, Louis, worked as an editor on the newspaper Journal de Gèneve. After completing secondary school in Schwyz, Pierre Courthion was educated at the University of Geneva and was awarded a scholarship to study painting at the École des Beaux-Arts in Paris. During his studies, he befriended artists Kurt Seligmann and Alberto Giacometti. He also married a fellow Swiss named Pierrette, with whom he had a daughter, Sabine. At the Louvre, he did his doctorate on the painter Jean-Étienne Liotard.

During World War II, Courthion and his family fled from France back to Switzerland, where he participated in anti-Nazi resistance. In 1950, he was given French citizenship. He died in 1988.

== Work ==
From 1933 to 1939, Courthion was the director of the Swiss Foundation of the Cité internationale universitaire de Paris, before fleeing the Nazi invasion of France.

In 1941, Courthion interviewed Henri Matisse for a book that the elderly artist was to illustrate himself. However, on reading the proofs and sharing them with friends, Matisse considered Courthion's writing convoluted and mesquin ("small-minded"). Matisse then halted the book's publication, just a few weeks before it was due to come out. The "lost" interview was not published until 2013.

In 1960, Courthion served on the Guggenheim Prize jury.

In 2004, more than 15 years after his death, his autobiography, D'une palette à l'autre: mémoires d'un critique d'art (From One Palette to Another: Memoirs of an Art Critic) was posthumously published.

His papers are held at the Getty Research Institute in Los Angeles, California.

== Publications ==
- Panorama de la peinture française contemporaine
- D'une palette à l'autre : Mémoires d'un critique d'art
- La Peinture flamande : de Van Eyck à Bruegel
- Bonnard : peintre du merveilleux
- Soutine : peintre du déchirant
- Les Impressionnistes
- Le Visage de Matisse
- La Vie de Delacroix
- Delacroix : journal et correspondance
- Paris : de sa naissance à nos jours
- D'une palette à l'autre: mémoires d'un critique d'art, autobiography, 2004
