= Benjamin Péret =

French poet

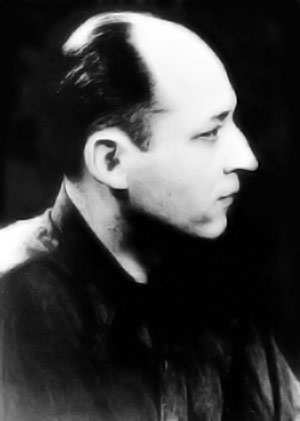
- Born: 4 July 1899; Rezé, Loire-Atlantique, France
- Died: 18 September 1959 (aged 60); Paris, Île-de-France, France
- Known for: Writing
- Movement: Dada, Surrealism

Benjamin Péret (4 July 1899 – 18 September 1959) was a French poet, Parisian Dadaist, and founder and central member of the French Surrealist movement with his avid use of Surrealist automatism.

== Biography ==
Benjamin Péret was born in Rezé, France on 4 July 1899. He, as a child, acquired little education due to his dislike of school and he instead attended the Local Art School in 1912. In 1913, he resigned due to his lack of study and willingness to do so. Afterward he spent a short period of time in a School of Industrial Design.

During World War I, Péret enlisted in the French army's Cuirassiers, to avoid being jailed for defacing a local statue with paint. He saw action in the Balkans, before being deployed to Salonica, Greece.

During a routine movement of his unit via train, he discovered a copy of Pierre Albert-Birot's avant-garde magazine SIC: Sons Idées Couleurs, Formes, founded in January 1916, sitting upon a bench on the station platform. It contained poetry by Apollinaire and sparked Péret's love for experimental poetry. SIC was the second Parisian magazine, after Nord-Sud, to distribute the texts of the Zürich Dadaists, namely those of Tristan Tzara. At the end of its publication in December 1919, SIC had published 53 issues.

Towards the end of the war, still in Greece, he suffered from an attack of dysentery which led to his repatriation and deployment in Lorraine for the remainder of the war. After the end of the war he joined the Dada movement and soon after, in 1921, he published Le Passager du transtlantique – his first book of poetry before he abandoned the Dada movement to follow André Breton and the emerging Surrealist movement, working alongside and influencing the Mexican writer Octavio Paz.

In the fall of 1924 he was the co-editor of the journal La Révolution surréaliste, becoming chief editor in 1925. And in 1928, before emigrating to Brazil in 1929 with his wife Elsie Houston, he published Le Grand Jeu. Two years later in 1931, a mere few months after the birth of his first son, Geyser, whilst living in Rio de Janeiro, he was arrested and expelled from Brazil on grounds of being a "Communist Agitator" – having formed, with his brother-in-law Mario Pedrosa, the Brazilian Communist League which was based upon the ideas of Trotsky.

After returning to France, he went to Spain at the outbreak of the Spanish Civil War and entered into an anarchist militia at Pino de Ebro. Back in France, in 1940 he was imprisoned for his political activities. Upon his release, he sailed for Mexico with the aid of the American-based Emergency Rescue Committee to study pre-Columbian myths and American folklore. He had originally wished to emigrate to the United States but was unable to do so due to his Communist affiliations. Péret went to Mexico with his partner, the Spanish artist Remedios Varo.

In Mexico City he became involved with the European intellectual community around the Austrian painter and surrealist Wolfgang Paalen living there in exile. He was particularly inspired by Paalen's huge collection and knowledge about the "Totem Art" of the Northwest Coast of British Columbia; 1943 he finished a long essay on the necessity of poetic myths, exemplified with the mythology and art of the Northwest Coast, which was then published in New York by André Breton in VVV. While living in Mexico City, Péret met Natalia Sedova, Trotsky's widow.

He remained in Mexico until the end of 1947. He returned to Paris and died there on 18 September 1959.

== Works ==
1921: Le Passager du transatlantique
1925: Cent cinquante-deux proverbes mis au goût du jour, en collaboration avec Paul Éluard
1927: Dormir, dormir dans les pierres
1928: Le Grand Jeu
1934: De derrière les fagots
1936: Je sublime
1936: Je ne mange pas de ce pain-là
1945: Le Déshonneur des poètes
1945: Dernier Malheur dernière chance
1946: Un point c’est tout
1952: Air mexicain
1955: Le Livre de Chilam Balam de Chumayel
1956: Anthologie de l’amour sublime
1957: Gigot, sa vie, son œuvre
1960: Le premier tournage de porno

=== English translations ===
- Four Years After the Dog. Poems of Benjamin Péret. Arc Publications, 1974.
- Irregular Work. Actual Size Press, 1984.
- Death to the Pigs and the Field of Battle. Atlas Press, 1988.
- From the Hidden Storehouse (Selected Poems by Benjamin Péret). Oberlin College, 1991.
- Mad Balls. Atlas Press, 1991.
- The Automatic Muse. Atlas Press, 1994.
- A Menagerie in Revolt! Selected Writings. Black Swan Press, 2009.
- The Leg of Lamb: Its Life and Works. Cambridge, MA: Wakefield Press, 2011
- The Big Game. Black Widow Press Translations, 2011.
