= Marcel Jean =

French art historian and painter (1900–1993)

- Born: 1900; La Charité-sur-Loire, France
- Died: December 4, 1993 (aged 92–93); Louveciennes, France
- Occupations: Painter, writer, sculptor
- Known for: Surrealist movement
- Notable work: Armoire Surrealiste

Marcel Jean (1900 in La Charité-sur-Loire, France - 4 December 1993 in Louveciennes, France) was a French painter, writer, and sculptor who joined the surrealist movement in 1933.

He is perhaps best known for his trompe l'oeil painting Armoire Surrealiste now in the permanent collection of the Musée des Arts Décoratifs, Paris. His work is also in the Peggy Guggenheim Collection and that of MoMA in New York City.

He authored two books on the history of Surrealism, Surrealism Histoire de la Peinture Surréaliste and L’Autobiographie du Surréalisme.

Jean was a close friend of Marcel Duchamp.
