= Deborah Lifchitz =

Expert on Semitic Ethiopian languages

- Born: 1907; Kharkiv, Russian Empire
- Died: 1942 (aged 34–35); Auschwitz concentration camp
- Occupations: ethnologist, linguist, expert on Semitic languages of Ethiopia

Deborah Lifchitz (5 June 1907 – 20 September 1942) was a Polish-French ethnologist and linguist, expert on Semitic languages and cultures of Ethiopia. She worked at the Musée de l'Homme in Paris and took part in the Dakar–Djibouti mission in 1932–3. During the holocaust, the Nazis imprisoned her in 1942 and murdered her in Auschwitz.

Deborah (Desirée) Lifchitz (at times spelled Lifschitz, Lifszyc or Livchitz) was born in Kharkiv (then part of the Russian Empire, now Ukraine) in 1907 to a family of Polish Jews. Her father was a dentist. Following the October Revolution, her family left Kharkiv in 1919, first to Crimea and from there in 1920 to Warsaw. After her baccalauréat (high school diploma) at Warsaw's French lycée in 1927, Lifchitz left Poland for Paris, where she studied at the National School of Modern Oriental Languages (Langues O’). She graduated with diplomas in literary and vernacular (Middle Eastern) Arabic, Persian and Amharic (her teacher in the latter language was Marcel Cohen). She also completed a licence (licentiate) degree in ethnology, ancient semitic languages and history of religions at the University of Paris Faculty of Humanities (Sorbonne) as well as vocational training as a librarian.

Upon her graduation, she joined the Dakar–Djibouti mission across Africa led by Marcel Griaule. During this research journey, she met with the Beta Israel (Jews of Ethiopia). After her return to Paris, Lifchitz received a position at the Africa department of the Musée d'Ethnographie du Trocadéro which later, in 1937, became the Musée de l'Homme anthropological museum. In 1935, she was a member of the museum's mission to French Sudan (Mali) alongside her colleague and friend Denise Paulme. From Mali she brought back two museum pieces of Dogon art currently displayed in the Louvre and the Quai Branly museums. After post-graduate studies with Marcel Cohen, she completed her thesis on "Ethiopian magico-religious texts" in 1937, receiving the diploma of the historical-philological section, École pratique des hautes études (EPHE). Her dissertation was published in the Paris Institute of Ethnology monograph series edited by Marcel Mauss and Paul Rivet in 1940.

Deborah Lifchitz wrote one book and several articles, which are still considered milestones in the research of Ethiopian languages. During her studies and work at the Musée de l'Homme, Deborah Lifchitz studied and collaborated with the greatest anthropologists and Africanists in Paris of the day, among them Michel Leiris, Wolf Leslau, Marcel Griaule, Marcel Mauss, Marcel Cohen, Paul Boyer, Paul Rivet, Georges Dumézil, Denise Paulme, with whom she wrote many articles, and more.

She applied for French citizenship in 1931, which she was granted in 1937 following letters of recommendation from several of her eminent academic colleagues. When the Nazis entered Paris, Lifchitz stayed in the city, and after losing her jobs because of the racial laws she was taken in by her colleague Michel Leiris. In February 1942, she was arrested by the French police, taken to French concentration camp, and from there to Auschwitz where she was murdered later that year. According to the testimony of Marcel Cohen she was gassed.
