= Nicolas Calas =

Greek-American poet and art critic

Nicolas Calas (Nikos Kalamaris)
- Born: May 27, 1907; Lausanne, Switzerland
- Died: December 31, 1988 (aged 81); New York City
- Occupations: Poet, Art critic, Polemicist
- Writing career
- Pen name: Also: Nikitas Randos (Νικήτας Ράντος), M. Spieros (Μ. Σπιέρος)
- Period: 1932–1985
- Genres: Surrealism, Modernism, Art criticism

Nicolas Calas (Greek: Νικόλαος Κάλας) (May 27, 1907 – December 31, 1988) was the pseudonym of Nikos Kalamaris (Νίκος Καλαμάρης), a Greek-American poet and art critic. While living in Greece, he also used the pseudonyms Nikitas Randos (Νικήτας Ράντος) and M. Spieros (Μ. Σπιέρος).

== Biography ==
Nicolas Calas was born Nikos Kalamaris in Lausanne, Switzerland, May 27, 1907, but grew up in Athens, the only son of Ioannis Kalamaris who descended from a family of ship-owners and landowners from the island Syros, and Rosa Caradja who was the great-granddaughter of Markos Botsaris, the military leader and hero of the Greek War of Independence, and a descendant from the Phanariot Caradja family, a noble family which supplied high officials to the Ottoman Empire and rotating rulers to Danubian principalities. Calas later rebelled against his wealthy family background by becoming a Trotskyist, strongly influenced in his turn to radical politics by witnessing the human tragedy of the refugees of the 1922 Asia Minor catastrophe flooding the streets of Athens.

=== Greece ===
Calas studied Law and Political Science at the University of Athens between 1925 and 1930 and became active in the radical Student Society. Although he worked in a law office between 1930 and 1934, he soon abandoned this career to concentrate on his writing, both poetry and literary and political critique, often highly polemical in both style and content. Calas's critical work, mostly published under the pseudonym M. Spieros (influenced by the French revolutionary Maximilien Robespierre), was published in a string of literary and political journals in Greece between 1929 and 1938. He covered a wide range of subjects, such as cinema, politics and literary criticism, and he was the first critic to analyze the poetry of Constantine Cavafy from a Freudo-Marxist perspective. Calas's poetry, published under the pseudonym Nikitas Randos, went through several stylistic changes which reflected his artistic curiosity and interest in the modernist trends of the early 20th century, such as futurism, expressionism and surrealism. In 1932, Calas's debut Poems (Ποιήματα) was published. One of the first true modernists in Greece, Calas was clearly ahead of his time and suffered some negative criticism. His debut was followed by four poetry "notebooks" (Tetradia, Greek: Τετράδια Α’-Δ’) which circulated hors de commerce between 1933 and 1936.

=== France ===
Between 1934 and 1937, Calas split his time between Athens and Paris, where he soon became a member of the surrealist group attached to André Breton. The politically repressive climate in Greece after the 1936 coup of the dictator General Metaxas necessitated his permanent abandonment of Greece and he thus settled permanently in Paris in 1937. He continued writing poems, now in French, which were highly influenced by his immersion in surrealist poetics. Unpublished at the time, Calas's French poems finally appeared in a bilingual edition (French-Greek) in 2002 in Greece.

In 1938, Calas published a book of Freudo–Surrealist–Trotskyist criticism in French, Foyers d’incendie (Hearths of Arson) which revealed his influence by theoreticians of the Frankfurt School, especially Wilhelm Reich, as well as the manifesto "Towards a Free Revolutionary Art" formulated by Leon Trotsky, Diego Rivera and André Breton in Mexico in 1938.

=== Portugal ===
Forced to leave France at the eruption of World War II, Calas reached Lisbon in October 1939 where he waited for an opportunity to get on a boat to USA. During the few months he stayed in the Portuguese capital, he studied the baroque architecture of the city apart from trying to form a group of surrealists. He was finally able to leave Europe behind in the beginning of 1940 after receiving a visa through the help of his friend Sherry Mangan, an American Trotskyist poet and journalist working for Time magazine.

=== New York ===
Calas arrived in New York as one of the first émigré surrealists in 1940 and ended up living there until his death in 1988, working mainly as an art critic for several leading art journals, such as View, Village Voice, Arts Magazine and Artforum. Before Calas was able to carve a niche for himself as an art critic and lecturer, he earned his living from a number of odd jobs. From 1942 to 1945 he worked in the French and Greek sections of the Office of War Information as well as in the Balkan section of the Intelligence Service. His first book in English, a collection of essays on poetry, Portuguese Baroque, portrait painting and modern architecture, Confound the Wise, was published in 1942. In 1943 he married the divorcee Elena von Hoershelman, a Russian-born psychoanalyst with whom he would go on to collaborate on a number of research projects, articles and books. For some years they worked together at the Columbia University Project of Studies in Contemporary Cultures. During this time Calas became a research-associate and consultant for the renowned anthropologist Margaret Mead and in 1953 their collaboration resulted in the publication of an anthropological anthology entitled Primitive Heritage. Calas received three successive grants from the Bollingen Foundation (1949–1951) to write a study of the triptych The Garden of Earthly Delights by Hieronymus Bosch but failed to get it published and continued rewriting the manuscript until his death. From the 1960s onwards Calas pursued a career as an art critic and as a lecturer of art history at Fairleigh Dickinson University in New Jersey. As one of the few surrealists, Calas showed an interest in the new American art movements of the 1960s and wrote extensively on the subject of Pop Art apart from advocating a redefinition of surrealist goals and expressions. Many of his essays were collected in the volumes Art in the Age of Risk (1968), Icons and Images of the Sixties (1971) and Transfigurations (1985). Following the coup of the Colonels in Greece in 1967, Calas collaborated with the exiled Greek revolutionary Trotskyist Michalis Raptis (Pablo) who was active in the resistance abroad.

=== Greek comeback ===
After spending some time in Greece during the 1950s, sorting out the family affairs after the death of his father, Calas began to write poems again in Greek in a cryptic and satirical style. These poems were first published in the avant-garde journal Pali (Πάλι) in the 1960s. This led to a comeback in Greece where he had previously been ignored or neglected as a poet. His old poems were republished together with his new poetry in the two collections Nikitas Randos Street (Οδός Νικήτα Ράντου), which won the State Prize for poetry in 1977, and Scripture and Light (Γραφή και φως) in 1983. Interest in his writings has been steadily increasing in Greece and he is now acknowledged as a groundbreaking poet and an important representative of modernism and a forerunner to Greek surrealism. After the death of Nicolas Calas in 1988 and his wife Elena Calas one year later, their art collection was inherited by the Louisiana Museum of Modern Art, Humlebaek, Denmark. The Nicolas and Elena Calas Archives are located at the Nordic Library in Athens.

== Works ==
=== Poetry ===
- Poems (Ποιήματα, 1932)
- Notebook I (Τετράδιο Α’, 1933)
- Notebook II (Τετράδιο Β’, 1933)
- Notebook III (Τετράδιο Γ’, 1934)
- Notebook IV (Τετράδιο Δ’, 1936)
- Nikitas Randos Street (Οδός Νικήτα Ράντου, 1977. ISBN 960-7721-24-1
- Scripture and Light (Γραφή και φως, 1983). ISBN 960-7721-34-9
- Sixteen French Poems and Correspondence with William Carlos Williams (Δεκαέξι γαλλικά ποιήματα και αλληλογραφία με τον Ουίλλιαμ Κάρλος Ουίλλιαμς, ed. Spilios Argyropoulos and Vassiliki Kolocotroni, 2002). ISBN 960-17-0084-6
- Oedipus is Innocent (Selected poems edited and translated by Lena Hoff, 2020). ISBN 9781916139275

=== Prose, essays, letters ===
- Hearths of Arson (French: Foyers d’incendie, 1938)
- Confound the Wise (1942)
- Primitive Heritage (co-edited with Margaret Mead, 1953)
- The Peggy Guggenheim Collection of Modern Art (co-written with Elena Calas, 1967)
- Art in the Age of Risk (1968)
- Icons and Images of the Sixties (co-written with Elena Calas, 1971)
- Surrealism Pro & Con (1973)
- Essays on Poetry and Aesthetics (Greek: Κείμενα ποιητικής και αισθητικής, ed. Alex. Argyriou, 1982). ISBN 0-8357-1690-2
- Transfigurations (1985)
- Yorgos Theotokas and Nicolas Calas. A Correspondence (Greek: Γιώργος Θεοτοκάς και Νικόλας Κάλας. Μια αλληλογραφία, ed. Ioanna Konstantoulaki-Hantzou, 1989)
- Nicolas Calas – Michalis Raptis. A Political Correspondence (Greek: Νικόλας Κάλας – Μιχάλης Ράπτης. Μια πολιτική αλληλογραφία, ed. Lena Hoff, 2002). ISBN 978-960-325-451-5
- Nicolas Calas – André Breton: lettres sur Hitler et l'impuissance de la littérature, in: Mélusine (Cahiers du Centre de Recherche sur le Surréalisme) XXXI: 231-252 (ed. Dimitri Kravvaris, 2011). ISBN 978-2-8251-4128-1
