= VVV (magazine) =

Magazine

- The cover of the final issue was designed by Roberto Matta and depicted a vagina dentata.
- Categories: Surrealism
- Founder: André Breton
- Founded: June 1942
- Final issue: February 1944
- Country: United States
- Based in: New York City, US
- Language: English, french
- ISSN: 0749-8926

VVV was a magazine devoted to the dissemination of Surrealism published in New York City from 1942 through 1944. It was the product of leading Surrealists.

== History and profile ==
VVV was first published in June 1942. The magazine was published and edited by David Hare in collaboration with Marcel Duchamp, André Breton, and Max Ernst. VVV's editorial board also enlisted a number of associated thinkers and artists, including Aimé Césaire, Philip Lamantia, and Robert Motherwell. Each edition focused on "poetry, plastic arts, anthropology, sociology, (and) psychology," and was lavishly illustrated by Surrealist artists, including Giorgio de Chirico, Roberto Matta and Yves Tanguy.

The magazine was experimental in format and in content. VVV included fold-out pages, sheets of different sizes and paper stock, and bold typography and color. The second magazine (which included issues two and three) featured a "readymade" by Duchamp as the back cover which was a cutout female figure "imprisoned" by a piece of actual chicken wire.

Only four issues of VVV were published (the second and third issues were printed as a single volume). The last one was published in February 1944. However, it provided an outlet for European Surrealist artists, who were displaced from their home countries by World War II, to communicate with American artists.

== See also ==
- Acéphale, a review created by Georges Bataille, published from 1936 to 1939
- Dyn, a review created by Wolfgang Paalen, published from 1942 to 1944 in Mexico
- Documents, a journal edited by Bataille from 1929 to 1930
- Minotaure, a publication founded by Albert Skira, published in Paris from 1933 to 1939
- La Révolution surréaliste, a publication founded by Breton, published in Paris from 1924 to 1929
- View, an American avant-garde art magazine, published from 1940 to 1947
