= André Schaeffner =

Schaeffner (left) and Anatole Lewitsky (right) at Copenhague in 1938.

André Schaeffner (February 7, 1895 – August 11, 1980) was a French musicologist and ethnomusicologist.

== Biography ==
André Schaeffner was born in Paris, France on February 7, 1895. From 1921 to 1924 he studied at the Schola Cantorum de Paris where he was a composition student of Vincent d'Indy, and a piano and harmony student of A. Philip. He pursued further studies at the Institut d'ethnologie from 1932 to 1933 where he was a pupil of Marcel Mauss in ethnology. This was followed by education in religious studies at the École pratique des hautes études from 1934 to 1937; later earning his diploma in 1940. He also studied archaeology with Salomon Reinach at the École du Louvre.

From 1929 to 1931 Shaeffner was secretary of the Orchestre de Paris. In 1929 he founded the department of ethnomusicology at the Musée de l'Homme; remaining head of this department until his retirement in 1965. He concurrently worked on the staff of the library at the Conservatoire de Paris from 1932 to 1941, and at the French National Centre for Scientific Research from 1941 to 1965. He led six different scientific excursions in Africa between the years 1931 and 1958; studying West African music and musical instruments. He taught at the Institut d’Ethnologie from 1936 to 1943. In the time period of German occupied Paris during World War II he served as secretary of the Concerts de la Pléiade. He was president of the Société française de Musicologie from 1958 to 1961; having previously served as vice-president from 1948 to 1958.

Schaeffner co-authored the book Le Jazz (1926, Paris) with André Cœuroy. He was the editor of the 1931 French-language edition of the Riemann Musiklexikon, and that same year authored a monograph on Igor Stravinsky. He was considered an authority on both European and non-European musical instruments; publishing an influential book Origine des instruments de musique (1936, Paris).

Schaeffner died in Paris on August 11, 1980.
