= Musée d'Ethnographie du Trocadéro =

Defunct museum in Paris, France

Coordinates: 48°51′46″N 2°17′19″E

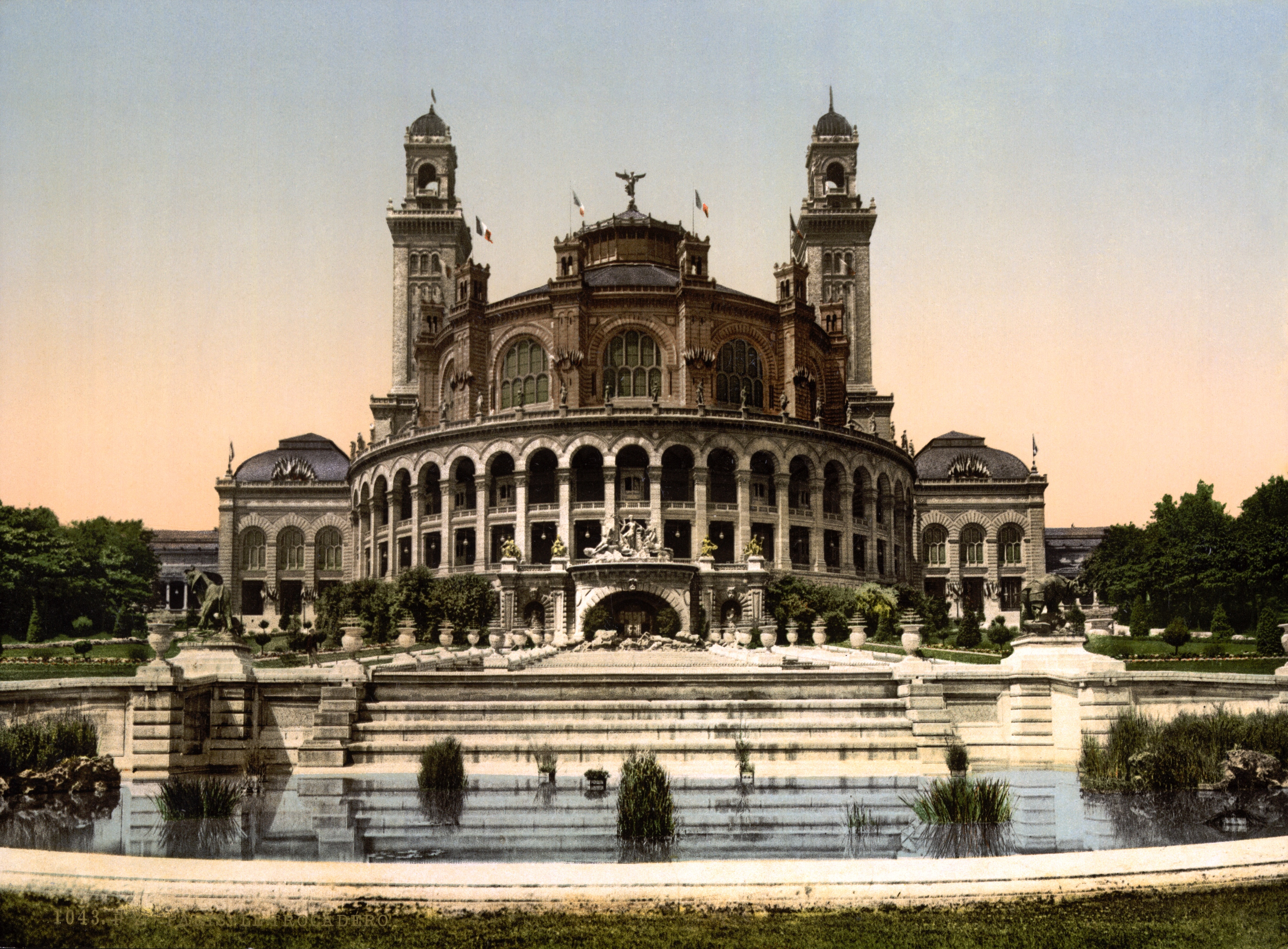
The Trocadéro Palace, home of the Musée d'Ethnographie du Trocadéro, in the 1890s

The Musée d'Ethnographie du Trocadéro (Ethnographic Museum of the Trocadéro, also called simply the Musée du Trocadéro) was the first anthropological museum in Paris, founded in 1878. It closed in 1935 when the building that housed it, the Trocadéro Palace, was demolished; its descendant is the Musée de l'Homme, housed in the Palais de Chaillot on the same site, and its French collections formed the nucleus of the Musée National des Arts et Traditions Populaires, also in the Palais de Chaillot. Numerous modern artists visited it and were influenced by its "primitive" art, in particular Picasso during the period when he was working on Les Demoiselles d'Avignon (1907).

== History ==
The museum was founded in 1878 by the Ministry of Public Education as the Muséum ethnographique des missions scientifiques (Ethnographic Museum of Scientific Expeditions) and was housed in the Trocadéro Palace, which had been built for the third Paris World's Fair that year. The palace, whose architect was Gabriel Davioud, had two wings flanking a central concert hall. The Musée national des Monuments Français was created at the same time in the other wing.

The first director of the anthropological museum was Ernest Hamy, an anthropologist with the Natural History Museum who had urged the foundation of such an institution in Paris since 1874. Other French cities already had such museums, and there were many collections of materials brought back by French explorers, particularly from South America. A temporary museum was housed in the three rooms of the Palace of Industry at the Exposition from January to mid-March 1878, featuring a major collection of Peruvian artifacts recently brought back by Charles Wiener, Columbian and Equatorial exhibits contributed by Édouard André, American exhibits contributed by Jules Crevaux, Léon de Cessac, and Alphonse Pinart, a collection from Central Asia contributed by Charles-Eugène Ujfalvy, Cambodian inscriptions from Jules Harmand, exhibits from the Celebes contributed by de La Savinière and de Ballieu, and items from the Canary Islands from René Verneau. These were exhibited with large paintings of locations in Peru and Colombia by de Cetner and Paul Roux and plaster casts of archeological artifacts made under the direction of Émile Soldi. The success of this temporary exhibition and the advantage for a country then in the midst of colonial expansion of encouraging popular interest in distant places persuaded the Ministry to make the museum permanent. It was assigned a budget in 1880. Together with Hamy, Armand Landrin was appointed as a second official and there were five attendants and an official artist and model-maker. In 1887, the museum received the pre-Columbian artefacts previously kept at the musée américain of the Louvre.

Of the World's Fair buildings, Hamy considered the main building on the Champ de Mars best suited to the museum, in particular since it could have heating installed in the basement. However, adaptation of that building was judged too expensive by the Ministry, which instead chose to use part of the Trocadéro Palace, against the advice of Eugène Viollet-le-Duc, the head of the site commission. The Trocadéro building lacked not only heating but lighting, and would not allow for workshops or laboratories.

However, thanks to Hamy's efforts by 1910 the museum's holdings had increased from 6,000 to 75,000 items. It continued to benefit from gifts and from expeditions after his death in 1908, particularly as a result of publicity activities by Paul Rivet (its director from 1928) and Georges Rivière among socialists and humanists in sympathy with the museum's mission of popular education, and among artists who in some cases offered art from their collections. The writer Raymond Roussel bore some of the cost of an African expedition that netted the museum more than 3,000 artifacts plus recordings and photographs. The museum promoted itself through a fashion show inspired by the collections and a gala benefit at the Cirque d'Hiver, at which Marcel Mauss reputedly shadow-boxed with featherweight champion Al Brown. The museum was offered the first head from Easter Island, passed on by the Geology Laboratory. Canadian National Railways donated the totem pole from British Columbia, now an emblem of the Musée de l'Homme. The museum maintained good relations with the Museum of Antiquities in Saint-Germain and the Guimet Museum, which passed along those items of more ethnographic than historical or scientific interest.

Nonetheless, the museum suffered constantly from lack of money, requiring, for example, the closure of the Oceanic gallery from 1890 to 1910 and of the French gallery in 1928. Furnishings had to be bought, or made of cheap wood painted black to improve its appearance, sometimes even wood from the packing cases used to ship the objects. According to an 1886 report, the defects of the exhibition space meant that of all the exhibits, only the life-size human figures, particularly the diorama of a Breton interior, were attractive:

How we prefer those colored wax models representing various savage types . . . and in a large gallery, this one well lighted, . . . a life-size Breton interior, strikingly true to life. . . . This exhibit, very well set up, has the knack of attracting the public. In the display cases, which are unfortunately very inadequate, household objects have been assembled. . . . This section is a bit neglected, all the interest being drawn by the Breton interior, to the great detriment of those details that accomplish the true objective of the ethnographic museum.

The poor conditions made it necessary to restore exhibits beginning in 1895. Picasso remembered that when he first went there in 1907, "the smell of dampness and rot there stuck in my throat. It depressed me so much I wanted to get out fast". Others saw it as "a junk shop". The problems were exacerbated by Hamy's death and then by World War I, when employees were drafted into the military. In 1919, a member of the Chamber of Deputies, Jean Bon, said that the museum shamed France. Verneau, who had succeeded Hamy as director in 1908, responded with a plan for improvements, while noting how hard it would be to realize within the then budget and in the then location.

In 1928, Paul Rivet was appointed director of the museum and reassociated it with the anthropology section of the Natural History Museum. Together with Georges Rivière, his assistant director, he set a modernization and reorganization project in motion, but the always inadequate quarters in the Trocadéro Palace were demolished in 1935 to be replaced by the Palais de Chaillot, built for the 1937 World's Fair. The museum reopened there that year as the Musée de l'Homme; its French exhibits were transferred to the Musée National des Arts et Traditions Populaires, which opened simultaneously, also in the Palais de Chaillot, with Rivière as its first director.

== Museographic approach ==
The museum was initially established as a purely scientific institution under the Department of Sciences and Letters, and in addition was required not to compete with anthropology museums. To secure its foundation, it had been essential to guarantee that it would not compete with pre-existing institutions. Thus, the ministerial document dated November 1877 that related to the initial form of the museum, the temporary Museum of Scientific Exhibitions, specified that items of historical or artistic interest whose provenance was either Italy, Greece, Egypt or the East would revert to the Louvre, prehistoric or Gallo-Roman items of French provenance would go to the Museum of Antiquities in Saint-Germain, and medallions, books, and manuscripts must be deposited in the Bibliothèque Nationale. The new museum was not permitted to accept objects of an anthropological or natural historical nature, nor to offer instruction; a proposal by Landrin for an "expedition school" was thus denied. However, the museum was able to make exchanges with other museums, both in France and in other countries. In 1884, on Landrin's initiative, it opened the French Gallery that later formed the nucleus of the Musée National des Arts et Traditions Populaires.

The primary museographic purpose of the institution was to show the continuing progress of humanity. One of Hamy's arguments for its creation was that ethnology could serve as a reference and source of important information for the other sciences, as well as for crafts and manufacturing, even for foreign trade. His intention was first to carefully classify objects and then to submit them to methodical analysis in light of their context. He had wished for the museum to have galleries radiating from a central hall in order to demonstrate geographic and ethnographic connections. In 1882, the Revue d'ethnographie was launched as a journal that would emphasize fieldwork and objective research, in contrast to existing journals on specific cultures and on ethnography, which tended to emphasize theory. However, it only survived for seven years before being merged into L'Anthropologie.

== Artists ==
Numerous Fauve and Cubist artists discovered "primitive" tribal art, particularly Black African art, at the Trocadéro Museum. The museum held a collection of primitive masks from various areas of the world; Picasso said that he discovered in the African masks "what painting was all about", seeing them as having been created "as a kind of mediation between [humanity] and the unknown hostile forces that [surround us]", and to have been influenced by the masks in the forms of the figures in his proto-Cubist painting Les Demoiselles d'Avignon, which eventually led to Cubism. Later, during the reform era under Rivet and Rivière that began in 1928, certain Surrealists aligned themselves with the ethnologists in promoting a view of objects within their social and human context, rather than from a purely esthetic perspective. For two years, ethnologists such as Rivet, Rivière, Marcel Griaule, and André Schaeffner and dissident Surrealists such as Georges Bataille collaborated in a journal called Documents. However, the disagreements between ethnological and esthetic viewpoints, later to characterize the debate around the creation of the Musée du quai Branly, were strong enough that the Musée de l'Homme, when founded, was avowedly scientific in character.

== Sources ==
- Émile Arthur Soldi. Les Arts méconnus: les nouveaux musées du Trocadéro. Paris: Leroux, 1881 (in French)
- René Verneau. "Le Musée d’ethnographie du Trocadéro". Extraits d’ethnographie Paris: Masson, 1919 (in French)
- Michel Leiris. "Du musée d’Ethnographie au musée de l’Homme". La Nouvelle Revue française (1938) 344–45 (in French)
- Marie-France Noël. "Du Musée d’ethnographie du Trocadéro au Musée national des Arts et traditions populaires". Muséologie et ethnologie (1987) 140–51 (in French)
- Jean Cuisenier and Marie-Chantal de Tricornot. Musée national des arts et traditions populaires: Guide. Paris: Réunion des musées nationaux, 1987. ISBN 978-2-7118-2087-0. pp. 9–11 (in French)
- Nélia Dias. Le Musée d’Ethnographie du Trocadéro, 1878–1908: anthropologie et muséologie en France. Paris: Centre national de la recherche scientifique, 1991. ISBN 978-2-222-04431-4 (in French)
