= Charles Du Bos =

French writer (1882–1939)

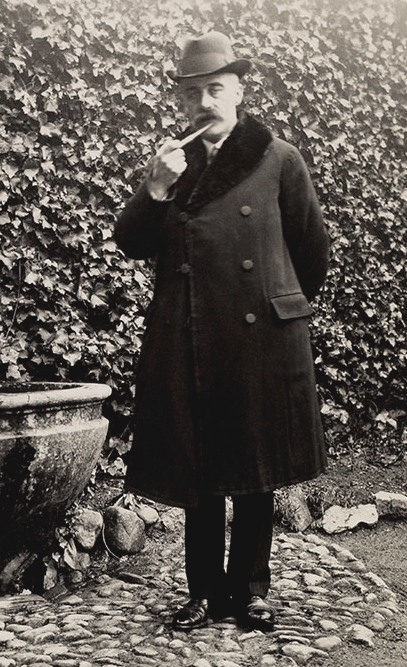
- Born: 22 October 1882; Paris, France
- Died: 5 August 1939 (aged 56); La Celle-Saint-Cloud, France
- Education: Catholic Collège Gerson; Lycée Janson de Sailly; Balliol College, Oxford
- Occupations: Essayist and critic
- Writing career
- Period: 1921–1939

Charles Du Bos (French: [dy bo]; 27 October 1882 – 5 August 1939) was a French essayist and critic, known for works including Approximations (1922–37), a seven-volume collection of essays and letters, and for his Journal, an autobiographical work published posthumously from 1946 to 1961. His other work included Byron et le besoin de la fatalité (1929), a study of Lord Byron, and Dialogue avec André Gide (also 1929), an essay on his friend André Gide. Influenced by thinkers including Henri Bergson, Georg Simmel and Friedrich Nietzsche, Du Bos was well-known as a literary critic in France in the 1920s and 1930s. He maintained a distance from the political developments of those decades, while nonetheless seeking in his writing to reframe political phenomena as ethical problems. Alongside Gide and the American novelist Edith Wharton, he was involved in providing aid to Belgian refugees in Paris following the 1914 German invasion of Belgium. Raised Catholic, Du Bos lost his faith as a young man, then regained it in 1927, and regarded this conversion as the central event of his life.

== Life ==
=== Early life and education ===
Charles Du Bos was born in Paris on 27 October 1882. He belonged to a family of the haute bourgeoisie from the region around Amiens, with an English mother and American grandmother, and grew up speaking both French and English. He was schooled at the Catholic Collège Gerson, then attended the Lycée Janson de Sailly from 1895 and Balliol College, Oxford in 1901 and 1902. It was at Oxford that he initially lost his Catholic faith.

In 1902 he abandoned an agrégation in English at the Sorbonne, and travelled instead to Florence, where he became friends with Violet Paget. Du Bos then spent time in Berlin in 1904 and 1905, where he stayed with Reinhold and Sabine Lepsius and became friends with Max Liebermann, Ernst Robert Curtius and Bernard Groethuysen. In this period he studied the history of art under Heinrich Wölfflin and came into contact with Georg Simmel. While in Germany Du Bos arrived at a set of beliefs about religion and its relation to art to which he would adhere for the following quarter of a century.

=== Subsequent life and career ===
In February 1907 Du Bos married Juliette Siry, with whom he had one daughter. He suffered from chronic illness from 1913 and was at times forced to abandon his work as a result. In 1915 his brother was killed in battle.

Du Bos was close friends with André Gide. He admired Gide's work, shared his spiritual commitments, and described a dialogue with Gide "in the margins" of his own writing. His friendship with Gide later declined, and Du Bos' estimation of Gide's work diminished accordingly. Their conflict was rooted in Du Bos' perception of Gide as disavowing or betraying his spiritual faith, in contrast to Du Bos' own return to faith. Du Bos' essay Dialogue avec André Gide was published in 1929.

From 1914 to 1916 he and Gide were part of the Foyer Franco-Belge, in which capacity they worked to find employment, food and housing for Franco-Belgian refugees who arrived in Paris following the German invasion of Belgium. These efforts were led by Edith Wharton, who Du Bos had met through their mutual friend Paul Bourget. He was later asked to resign from his administrative role in the Foyer by Wharton and, when he declined, was relieved of his power to issue financial grants. In the years 1919–21 he was Paris correspondent for The Athenaeum.

Du Bos became well-known in France for his literary criticism in the 1920s and 1930s. From 1922 to 1927 he was a supervisor of foreign writers for the publisher Plon. From 1925 to 1932 he lectured at universities in Germany, Switzerland and Italy.

Du Bos converted to Roman Catholicism, the faith of his childhood, in 1927, having previously been a theist. He regarded his conversion as the central event of his life, and described it in his work over a number of years. In the late 1920s Du Bos became editor-in-chief of Vigile, a Catholic review founded by Jacques Maritain and staffed by Catholic former contributors to the Nouvelle Revue Française. In 1937 Du Bos travelled to the United States due to financial problems and his difficulty acquiring an academic post in France, and took up a position at the University of Notre Dame, Indiana, with the support of Notre Dame's president John Francis O'Hara. Du Bos died in La Celle-Saint-Cloud on 5 August 1939.

=== Political commitments ===
Du Bos' friend Gabriel Marcel said Du Bos exhibited a "radical disinterest in all that occurred in the public realm" and a "spiritual agoraphobia", and said of him "There has never been a less political being." Nonetheless, Marcel acknowledged that Du Bos did allow political issues to trouble him when they were explicable as ethical problems. Du Bos viewed the political turmoil of the 1930s primarily through an ethical lens. He sought a form of political engagement that would facilitate sincere dialogues across cultural and political divides. He admired Léon Blum, who he saw as having honestly expressed his own inner turmoil. He was a signatory to three manifestoes by Jacques Maritain published between 1935 and 1937, which called on Christians to refuse to choose between fascism and communism, denounced Italian Fascism while opposing conflict with Italy, and condemned the bombing of Guernica. He cautiously applauded the Munich Agreement of 1938, but soon came to realise it had not succeeded in securing peace.

Du Bos' cosmopolitan heritage and his experience of the First World War led him to refuse nationalism and Germanophobia. He wrote in 1933: "I have never known, insofar as I have ever experienced it, either a national or patriotic feeling ... the idea of a nation ... is in my eyes entirely devalued."

== Work ==
=== Overview ===
Du Bos' published work can be divided into three parts: the literary and aesthetic analysis of Approximations; the autobiographical work of the Journal; and the literary theory of What Is Literature?. Du Bos viewed literature as a central site of spiritual experience, and viewed the exploration of great authors' works as a means to acquire insight into universal truths and into one's own soul. His critical work focused on the relationship between works of art and artists' creative faculties, and on works' formal and structural elements. In some of his work his emphasis on authors' intuitions led him to prioritise their letters and diaries over their published work. Elsewhere he examined religious themes and identified similarities between the greatness or sublimity of certain works of art and religious virtues. His work tends to focus less on literary criticism in the sense of judging or classifying literary works, and more on interpreting such works. Du Bos sought to discern the inner meaning of artists' and authors' moments of inspiration, in search of clues to metaphysical truths and truths about the human condition. Du Bos found French literature relatively lacking in such insights, and so returned in his work to the literature of England, of Germany and of Italy. English poetry was held by Du Bos in particular esteem.

The primary influence on Du Bos' early thought was Henri Bergson, whose work he first encountered in 1899, when he was introduced to Time and Free Will. He would later write that he owed to Bergson "what in me is myself". From 1902 the work of John Keats began to play a greater role in his understanding of poetry and aesthetics. After coming into contact with Georg Simmel later the same decade, Simmel's thought came to exert a similar influence. Walter Pater and Du Bos' friend John Middleton Murry were also influences. Du Bos developed an account of the tragic that drew on Friedrich Nietzsche, Anton Chekhov, and his friend Jacques Maritain. He first read Nietzsche in 1900, and remained interested in the philosopher's work until his death, saying in 1933: "What I have always loved and venerated in Nietzsche, is Nietzsche himself, his purity, heroism, genius, beyond these qualities, and above all else, he will always be a climate and tonic for the soul."

=== Early work and Approximations ===
Du Bos' first literary venture was a translation of Edith Wharton's The House of Mirth. In 1921 Du Bos published a study of Gide's La Symphonie pastorale.

Approximations, a collection of critical essays and lectures, was published in seven volumes from 1922 to 1937. In Approximations Du Bos rejected the idea that literature is separate from life, arguing instead that "life owes more to literature than literature to life", as works of literature outlast human lives. The critical method of the book involves an exploration of an author's identity informed by readings of repetitions in their work. The essay "Sur le milieu intérieur dans Flaubert", examines Gustave Flaubert primarily through his letters and the descriptions he gave of himself. Du Bos reads Flaubert's novella November to describe the author as "all pulp, without a core, without resistance", as characterised by a fascination by human stupidity, and as coarsely vulgar. Sentimental Education, meanwhile, is identified by Du Bos as Flaubert's masterpiece. Other essays in Approximations concern Charles Baudelaire, Marcel Proust, Stefan George, Thomas Mann, Percy Bysshe Shelley, André Maurois, Thomas Hardy and Leo Tolstoy. In the essay "On Physical Suffering" he drew on his own experience of illness to describe the body as "sometimes the shining ray of the glory of Creation, and sometimes the enigmatic instrument of torture charged with following here below the work of the Cross."

=== Byron et le besoin de la fatalité and Dialogue avec André Gide (1929) ===
Du Bos' book Byron et le besoin de la fatalité was published in 1929 and was translated by Ethel Colburn Mayne as Byron and the Need of Fatality in 1932. The book examines the causes of Lord Byron's allegedly incestuous relationship with his half-sister Augusta Leigh and its effects on his relationship with his wife Lady Byron, and argues that Byron had sex with Leigh because he saw himself in mythical terms as destined to commit a terrible crime. George Orwell reviewed the book in The Adelphi in 1932 and described it as "a fair-minded, discerning book, very interesting to anyone who wants to see the whole story of Byron, his wife and his half-sister thoroughly thrashed out."

1929 also saw the publication of Du Bos' Dialogue avec André Gide. The essay, informed by Du Bos' Catholic convictions, condemned Gide's homosexuality. In his 1927 journals, Du Bos complained of feeling bored and oppressed by the necessity of composing Dialogue avec André Gide. In 1928 he decided to cancel its publication, then later reversed this decision. Gide's friends sought to convince Du Bos not to publish the text, but Du Bos felt compelled by his own convictions and was encouraged by Jacques Maritain. Gide and Du Bos' mutual friend Ernst Robert Curtius criticised the book in a letter to Gide, writing that "he [Du Bos] judges you according to Catholic morals suffices to neglect his complete indictment. It can only touch those who think like him and are convinced in advance. He has abdicated his intellectual liberty." In a letter to Du Bos, Curtius wrote: "as a literary critic I am troubled by the fact that your aesthetic appreciation is obviously, undermined by your non possumus in moral issues ... How to prevent oneself from thinking that your aesthetic judgement has deviated as a result of non-literary reasons?"

=== Later work and Journal ===
What Is Literature?, a collection of four lectures on Percy Bysshe Shelley and John Keats delivered at the University of Notre Dame in 1938, was published in 1940. Its first part, "Literature and the Spirit", likens literary creation to God's creation of the world, while "Literature and Beauty" defines beauty as order and as the raison d'être of human life, and the book's conclusion called for the manifestation of a Catholic literature. Returning to Keats, an early interest, he argues the poet was unique in successfully balancing the needs of the abstract and the concrete. Responding to the question posed by the title, Du Bos defines literature as "life becoming conscious of itself when, in the soul of a man of genius, it joins its plenitude of expression."

Du Bos' autobiographical Journal was written between 1902 and 1939 and published first in excerpted form in 1931, then in full from 1946 to 1961. In it, everyday occurrences serve as the occasion for literary essays. His tone is frequently self-deprecating or self-critical. Du Bos describes the developments leading to his conversion to Catholicism, and his reluctance to renounce the authors and works he had previously enjoyed; and describes immediate impressions following from books, attending art galleries and concerts, and conversations with others. The fourth volume of the Journal, featuring entries written in 1928, discusses Du Bos' conflict with Gide, their efforts to reconcile, and the circumstances surrounding the publication of Dialogue avec André Gide (1929). Gide considered the Journal Du Bos' most important work.

In 1938 Du Bos began writing a series of diary entries discussing European politics, and especially the Munich Agreement, in personal and ethical terms. He described the problem posed by the Agreement as an ethical problem: whether it was morally right to go to war in defence of Austria after the Anschluss and Czechoslovakia after the annexation of Sudetenland, or whether peace should be pursued at all costs. Ultimately, he viewed the problem as one without a solution.

Goethe (1949) was assembled from essays on Johann Wolfgang von Goethe previously published in Approximations. One essay describes Goethe's experiences as a student, while others relate to the religious crisis he experienced around the death of Susanne von Klettenberg and his relationship with Lili Schönemann. Du Bos praises Goethe's pursuit of perfection, but criticises him for remaining on the terrain of the human rather than that of the spiritual.

Du Bos planned but never completed studies of Walter Pater and of Keats. At the time of his death much of Du Bos' work remained unpublished. Du Bos' work influenced later European writers including Albert Béguin, Georges Poulet and Jean Starobinski. Poulet praised Du Bos as his closest influence, while Jean-Pierre Richard and Jean Rousset identified Du Bos' study of Flaubert as a seminal work.

== Publications ==
- Réflexions sur Mérimée. Albert Messein, 1920.
- Approximations. Série I (1922), série II (1927), série III (1929), série IV (1930), série V (1932), série VI (1934), série VII (1937) – New edition Éditions des Syrtes, 2000. 1525 pp.
- Le dialogue avec André Gide. Éditions Au Sans-Pareil, Paris, 1929. New edition Éditions Corréa, 1946.
- Byron et le besoin de la fatalité. Éditions Au Sans-Pareil, Paris, 1929. New editions Éditions Buchet-Castel, 1957, Archives Karéline, 2009.
- Extraits d'un Journal (1908–1928). Éditions Corréa, 1931.
- François Mauriac et le problème du romancier catholique. Éditions Corréa, 1933.
- What Is Literature?. Sheed & Ward, 1940.
- Grandeur et misère de Benjamin Constant. Éditions Corréa, 1946.
- La Comtesse de Noailles et le climat du génie. Éditions La Table Ronde, 1949.
- Journal (1921–1923). Éditions Corréa, 1946. New edition, Journal 1920-1925, Éditions Buchet-Chastel, 2003. 1069 pp.
- Journal (1924–1925). Éditions Corréa, 1948.
- Journal (1926–1927). Éditions Corréa, 1949. New edition, Journal 1926-1929, Éditions Buchet-Chastel, 2004. 999 pp.
- Journal (1928). Éditions Corréa, 1950.
- Journal (1929). Éditions Corréa, 1954.
- Journal (Janvier 1930 – Juillet 1931). La Colombe, Éditions du Vieux Colombier, 1955. New edition, Journal 1930-1939. Éditions Buchet-Chastel, 2005. 1054 pp.
- Journal (Août 1931 – Octobre 1932). La Colombe, Éditions du Vieux Colombier, 1955.
- Journal (1933). La Colombe, Éditions Du Vieux Colombier, 1959.
- Journal (Avril 1934 – Février 1939). La Colombe, Éditions du Vieux Colombier, 1961.
- Lettres de Charles du Bois et réponses de André Gide. Éditions Corréa, 1950.
