= Georges Poulet =

Belgian literary critic

- Born: Georges Poulet; 29 November 1902; Chênée, Liège, Belgium
- Died: 31 December 1991 (aged 89); Brussels, Belgium
- Education: University of Liège
- Occupations: Literary critic, professor
- Writing career
- Language: French
- Years active: 1927–1991
- Notable work: Studies in Human Time
- Notable awards: Prix Sainte-Beuve (1950), Grand prix de la Critique littéraire, Prix Durchon
- Literary movement: Geneva School

Georges Poulet (French: [pulɛ]; 29 November 1902 – 31 December 1991) was a Belgian literary critic associated with the Geneva School. Best known for his four-volume work Studies in Human Time, Poulet rejected formalist approaches to literary criticism and advanced the theory that criticism requires the reader to open their mind to the consciousness of the author. His work has had a lasting influence on critics such as J. Hillis Miller.

== Biographical information ==
Georges Poulet was born in Chênée, now part of Liège, Belgium in 1902. Poulet received his doctorate from the University of Liège in 1927, after which he taught at the University of Edinburgh. In 1952, Poulet became a professor of French Literature at Johns Hopkins University where he also acted as chair of the Department of Romance Languages and Literatures. He later taught at the University of Zurich and the University of Nice. Poulet died in Brussels, Belgium in 1991. His estate is archived in the Swiss Literary Archives in Bern.

Although he never taught at the University of Geneva, Poulet was associated with the Geneva School of literary criticism. He worked closely with critics such as Marcel Raymond, Albert Béguin, Jean Rousset, Jean Starobinski, and Jean-Pierre Richard. Poulet was influenced by his fellow Geneva School critics as well as by critics such as Jacques Riviere, Charles du Bos, Wilhelm Dilthey, and Friedrich Gundolf (Miller 305). Lawall (1968) identifies Poulet as "the first critic to develop Raymond's and Beguin's concept of experience in literature as a systematic tool of analysis. . . .He shifts their focus from the individual author to the author's generic human experience"(74).

A renowned author, Poulet published many works of literary criticism in his lifetime. Among his most famous books are the four volumes of his masterwork, Studies in Human Time. The first volume, also called Studies in Human Time, was published in France in 1949 and won the Prix Sainte-Beuve in 1950. Poulet was awarded the Grand prix de la Critique littéraire and the French Academy's Prix Durchon in Philosophy for the second volume, 1952's The Interior Distance. Volume three, Le point de départ, was published in 1964. The final volume, Mesure de l'instant appeared in 1968. In these four volumes, Poulet conducts an exhaustive examination of the work of French authors such as Molière, Proust, Flaubert, and Baudelaire to find the expression of what he calls the cogito, or consciousness, of each writer (Leitch et al. 1318).

== Poulet's criticism of consciousness ==
Like other Geneva School critics, Poulet rejects the concept of literary criticism as an objective evaluation of structural or aesthetic values. For critics such as Poulet and Raymond, literature is

neither an objective structure of meanings residing in the words of a poem or novel, nor the tissue of self-references of a "message" turned in on itself, nor the unwitting expression of the hidden complexes of a writer's unconscious, nor a revelation of the latent structures of exchange or symbolization which integrate a society. Literature, for them, is the embodiment of a state of mind. (Miller 306-7)

Lawall (1968) writes, "[Poulet] is not concerned with technical uniqueness, verbal manipulation of themes, or any aspect of art that may be called 'craftsmanship' (130). Instead, Poulet is interested in what he calls a 'criticism of consciousness.' "

Lawall (1968) describes criticism of consciousness as "a reading that explores the work's expression of a conscious, perceiving being." Poulet's goal is to "[rethink] and [re-create] the author's own expression"(78). It is possible for the reader to recreate the individual experience of the author because that experience is both personal and universal. For Poulet, the critic's job is to "[empty] his mind of its personal qualities so that it may coincide completely with the consciousness expressed in the words of the author" (Miller 307). While reading a book, Poulet is "aware of a rational being, of a consciousness: the consciousness of another, no different from the one I automatically assume in every human being I encounter, except that in this case the consciousness is open to me" (Poulet 54). Poulet calls this consciousness the author's cogito. The cogito is "each person's perception and creation of his own existence" (Lawall 86).

In order to fully grasp an author's cogito, it is important to examine all available examples of the author's work. For Poulet, letters, journals, and unpublished manuscripts hold as much information about the author's cogito as published novels or poems (Leitch et al. 1318). He did not believe that these sources should be analyzed as objects, however. Instead, they should be used by the reader to "coexist with the author's developing grasp and formulation of his own existence" (Lawall 112). By examining an author's complete body of work, the critic begins to see patterns of expression not only in the work of one particular author but also across literary periods.

In addition to the cogito, Poulet looks for the "point of departure" in an author's body of work. The point of departure is a "structural and organizing principle" around which the author's work is centered and which defines the author's individuality (de Man 82). Poulet asserts that all narratives emerge from a preconceived world in which the author has already determined everything that will happen in the future. This static world is the point of departure for the fictional narrative. If the critic can identify the point of departure, he or she will have a key to the author's cogito.

== Influence and criticism ==
By the 1970s, Poulet, and other phenomenological critics, had given way to a new wave of young critics (Leitch et al. 1319). Meltzer (1977) writes, "many critics sense a confidence, or complacency, in Poulet's work, which they believe results from a deafness on his part to the recent problematization of the literary experience and the language of literature" (viii). Formalist critics disagreed with Poulet's disregard for objective standards of literary value while structuralist, poststructuralist, and deconstructionist critics rejected the importance Poulet placed on the role of the author and his belief in engaging with the text as a representation of the author's consciousness.

Poulet's books continue to be read and admired. De Man writes, "more than any other, the criticism of Georges Poulet conveys the impression of possessing the complexity and the scope of a genuine work of literature" (80). Although many of his ideas have fallen from critical favour, Poulet's influence can still be seen in the work of J. Hillis Miller.

== List of major works ==
(The date given is for the publication of the English translation. For works not yet published in English, the original French title and date of publication is provided.)

- Studies in Human Time (1956)
- The Interior Distance (1959)
- Metamorphoses of the Circle (1961)
- Le Point de départ (1964)
- Trois essais de mythologie romantique (1966)
- Les Chemins actuels de la critique (1967)
- Mesure de l'instant (1968)
- La Conscience critique (1969)
- Who Was Baudelaire? (1969)
- Entre moi et moi: Essais critiques sur la conscience de soi (1977)
- Proustian Space (1977)
- Exploding Poetry: Baudelaire/Rimbaud (1984)
- La Pensée indéterminée, vol. 1-3 (1985–90)

== Sources ==
- de Man, Paul. Blindness and Insight: Essays in the rhetoric of contemporary criticism. New York: Oxford, 1971.
- Lawall, Sarah N. Critics of Consciousness: The existential structures of literature. Cambridge: Harvard UP, 1968.
- Leitch, Vincent B. et al. "Georges Poulet". The Norton Anthology of Theory and Criticism. New York: Norton, 2001. 1317–20.
- Meltzer, Françoise. Introduction. Exploding Poetry. By Georges Poulet. Baltimore: Johns Hopkins UP, 1977. vii-xi.
- Miller, J. Hillis. "The Geneva School: The Criticism of Marcel Raymond, Albert Béguin, Georges Poulet, Jean Rousset, Jean-Pierre Richard, and Jean Starobinski". The Critical Quarterly VIII, 4 (Winter 1966): 302–321.
- Poulet, Georges. "Phenomenology of Reading". New Literary History 1, 1 (October 1969): 53–68.
