= Albert Skira =

Swiss art dealer and publisher

- Born: 1904; Switzerland
- Died: 1973 (aged 68–69)
- Occupations: Publisher, art dealer

Albert Skira (1904–1973) was a Swiss art dealer, publisher and the founder of the Skira publishing house.

== The Skira publishing house, Editions d'Art Albert Skira ==
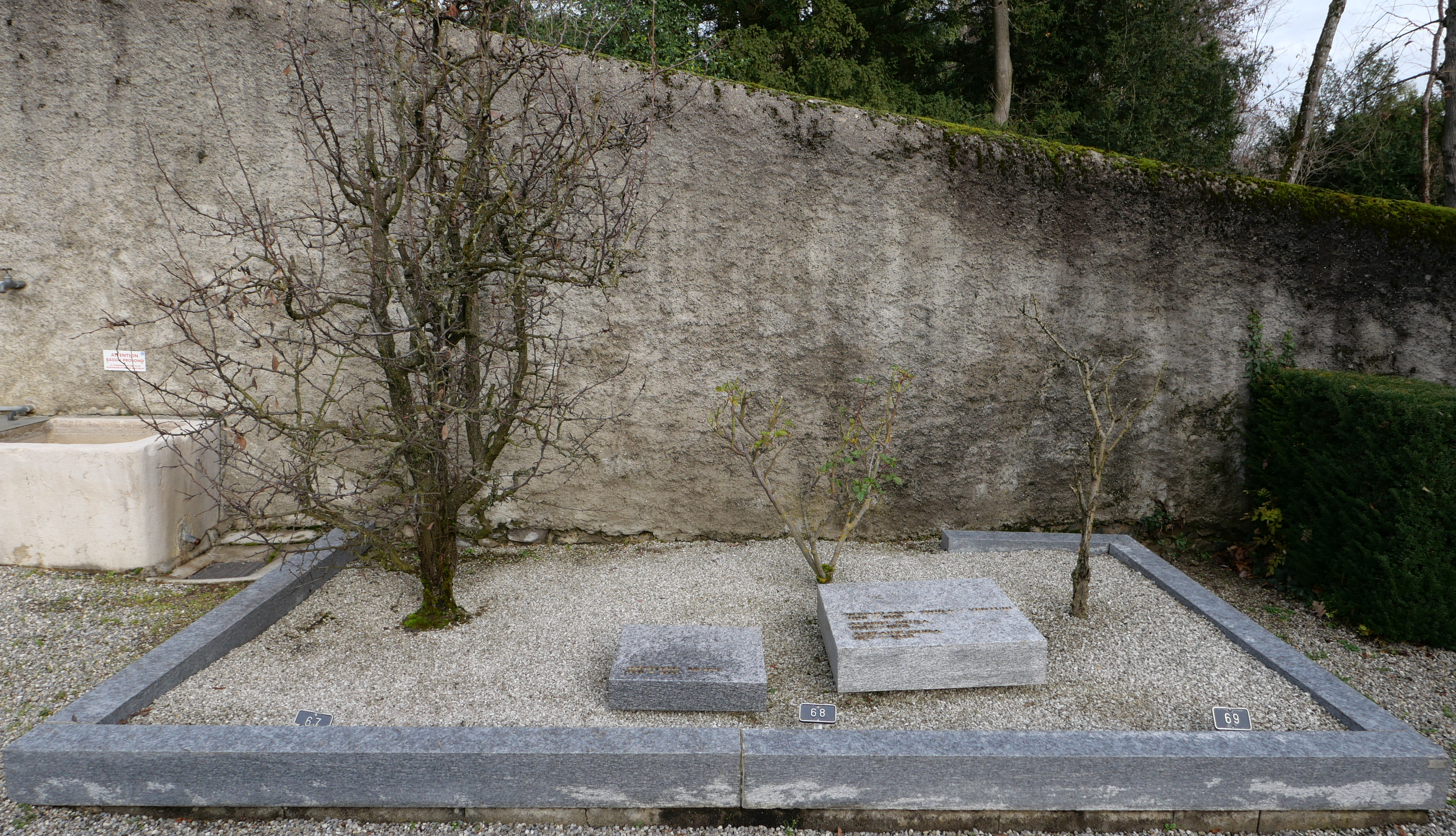
The family grave of Skira, his wife Rosabianca Skira-Venturi (1916-1999), his mother Adelaïde, née Degiorgi (1877-1949) and of Christophe Saudan (1969-2008) at the Old Cemetery of Cologny in the canton of Geneva.

Skira founded the eponymous publishing house in Lausanne in 1928, at various times known as Skira, Editions d'Art Albert Skira, and Skira Editore. During the 1930s Skira opened an office in Paris and the publishing house became a meeting place for important artistic figures of the time. In 1933, Skira contacted André Breton about a new journal, which he planned to be the most luxurious art and literary review the Surrealists had seen, featuring a slick format with many color illustrations. Skira's restriction was that Breton was not allowed to use the magazine to express his social and political views. Later that year Minotaure began publication, and continued until 1939.

In addition to Minotaure Skira published several volumes of literature and poetry in the 1930s, both classic and contemporary, that prominently featured original prints by major artists of the time including: Les Métamorphoses by Ovid, illustrated with 30 original engravings by Pablo Picasso in 1931; Poésies by Stéphane Mallarmé, with 29 etchings by Henri Matisse in 1932; Les Chants de Maldoror by Isidore Lucien Ducasse [also known as the Comte de Lautréamont] with 43 etchings by Salvador Dalí published in 1934.

During the Second World War Skira's publishing house was forced to reduce its activities. Henri Matisse designed the cover of the Editions d'Art Albert Skira publisher's catalogue in 1948, for the celebration of its first twenty years, a woman’s head which was to become the unofficial trademark for Skira. After World War II Albert Skira planned and directed the publication of several ambitious series or, book collections, on the subject of painting and art history. The volumes in these collections were characterized by fine scholarship illustrated with numerous high quality color reproductions "tipped" into each volume. Most of the volumes in each collection were translated into multiple languages and available in English, French, German, Italian, and Spanish editions.

== Nazi-looted art ==
Skira was considered a Red Flag name for his involvement in Nazi-looted art during the German occupation of France during World War II. According to the OSS Art Looting Intelligence Unit, Skira purchased looted art from "Renou and Colle, Fabiani, Raphael Gerard, Carre and a group of sixteen less important Parisian dealers". Pierre Cailler, his partner in Editions d’Art Albert Skira SA, Geneva was also suspected of "trafficking in loot".

Art collector Peter Watson accused Skira of dealing in stolen art, and Skira avoided serious post-War repercussions with the Allied authorities for trading in looted art because Watson withdrew his allegations against him".

== Book collections planned and directed by Albert Skira 1948–1973 ==
- Painting, Color, History: 23 volumes (1949-1972) [four additional volumes published by Skira/Rizzoli after 1972]. A series surveying national schools of painting including Flemish (Vols. I-II), French (Vols. I-III), German (Vols. I-II), Italian (Vols. I-IV), Spanish (Vols. I-II), Modern Painting (Vols. I-III) and more.
- The Great Centuries of Painting. 14 volumes, published 1950–1959. This collection presents a chronological overview of the history of painting in Europe and western civilization from prehistoric cave painting, to ancient Egypt, Greece, Rome, Medieval Europe, and the Renaissance through to the end of the nineteenth century.
- The Taste of our Time. 57 volumes, published 1953–1972. This collection includes: Monographs (43 volumes on European painters); The Great Art Revolutions (6 volumes on Cubism, Fauvism, Impressionism I & II, Romanticism, Surrealism); Famous Places as Seen by Great Painters (4 volumes on Montmartre, Paris I, Paris II, Venice); Drawing (4 unnumbered volumes on Chagall, Daumier, Impressionist, Picasso).
- The Treasures of Asia. 6 volumes, published 1960–1963. A companion series in matching format to The Great Centuries of Painting, surveying the history of painting in Arabia, Central Asia, China, India, Japan, and Persia.
- The Treasures of the World. 8 volumes, published 1962–1970. "Created by Albert Skira for Horizon Magazine" this series focuses on the architecture, fine art, and decorative arts of various cultures or cities including Ancient America, Iran, Spain I, Spain II: Turkey, The Pharaohs, The Vatican, and Venice.
- Art, Ideas, History. 10 volumes, published 1964–1969. Like the Great Centuries of Painting, this collection is a chronological historical overview (from 980 to 1945), expanding the coverage to encompass sculpture, architecture, and decorative arts, and to place that art into the broader social, political, philosophical, and historical context of the period that it was produced.
