= Skira (publisher) =

Swiss publishing firm

- Skira company logo
- Status: Active
- Founded: 1928
- Founder: Albert Skira
- Country of origin: Switzerland
- Headquarters location: Milan
- Publication types: Art books
- Official website: www.skira.net

Skira Editore and Editions d'Art Albert Skira, also known as Skira, is a publishing firm founded by Albert Skira in Switzerland in 1928 and now based in Italy. The firm is known particularly for its art books of "vastly improved quality of colour reproduction".

== Switzerland (1928–1932) ==
Originally located in Lausanne, Skira soon relocated to Geneva. Albert Skira wanted his firm to publish books in which "the greatest of artists illustrate the best in literature". For that reason Skira's first publications were a number of large scale artist's book editions. For the first book, Skira engaged Pablo Picasso to illustrate Ovid's "Les Métamorphoses" with 30 etchings, which were executed in 1930 in Picasso's neoclassical style and published in 1931 in a limited edition. These were followed by further luxury editions of poetry, including Stéphane Mallarmé's collection of poems "Poésies" illustrated with 29 etchings by Henri Matisse. Art historian John Jacobus said of Matisse's work "The etchings of the 1932 edition of Mallarmé perhaps mark the peak in his efforts in this medium". Salvador Dalí produced 43 etchings for Comte de Lautréamont's (Isidore Lucien Ducasse) "Les Chants de Maldoror" published in 1934. Virgil's Les Bucoliques was illustrated by André Beaudin 1936.

== Paris (1933–1940) ==
In 1933 Albert Skira moved to Paris and opened a branch of his firm there. At that time Paris was an artistic centre and many of the great modern movements, such as Surrealism, were active there. To cater for this audience, Skira, in collaboration with the art critic, editor and publisher Tériade, launched a glossy avant-garde art magazine with the title of Minotaure including an editorial committee with André Breton, Marcel Duchamp, Paul Eluard, Maurice Heine, and Pierre Mabille. Skira promoted the magazine as a "primary source of information about the arts" that would reproduce works of "universal interest" and supplement them with critical studies of current artistic trends. Picasso was commissioned to photograph a series of sculptures for the first number which also included reproductions of works by Matisse and Brassaï and contributions by Breton, Eluard and Pierre Reverdy.

In 1934 Skira launched a book series with the title Les trésors de la peinture française with each volume containing "large colour plates and a brief text". The series had sold a million copies in France and Switzerland by 1950 and ultimately grew to 48 volumes ending in 1952.

== Geneva (1941–1948) ==
In 1941 Albert Skira returned to Geneva. In the years 1941 to 1948 he devoted himself (with the assistance of Henri Matisse) to publishing Florilège des Amours de Ronsard (Anthology of the Amours of Pierre de Ronsard), a luxury artist's book created at the "highest possible standards ... in design and typography". Other major books published by Skira in the 1940s included Rabelais's Pantagruel (1943) (with "vibrantly-coloured woodcuts" by André Derain) and Malraux's Les Conquérants (1949) (with etchings by André Masson).

Towards the end of the war he also published "a monthly review of art and literature" called Labyrinthe (1944–1946) which contained essays on topics and by painters (Cingria, René Auberjonois, Gruber) and thinkers (Jean-Paul Sartre, André Malraux, Eluard) similar to those appearing in Minotaure but whose newspaper format showed that he was attempting to reach a wider audience. The final number of Labyrinthe published the first chapter of the final draft of Malraux's La Psychologie de l'Art (The Psychology of Art). Holman wrote her art history thesis on Editions d'Art Albert Skira focusing on the years between 1928 and 1948, his desire to publish a book with Picasso, and the different types of books he published: magazines, artist's books, and history books.

== Geneva (1949–1973) ==
In the 1950s and 1960s Skira became a multinational publisher of quality art books printed in color with very high technical standards. Skira published individual books on many areas of art, including histories, contemporary art, and decorative arts, from around the world, as well as large series of art books that were sold throughout Europe and North America. In French-speaking counties Skira's books were exclusively distributed by Achille Weber and in the United Kingdom by the art publishing firm and bookshop A. Zwemmer Ltd., which had previously distributed Minotaure in the 1930s. The books were distributed in the US and Canada by The World Publishing Company, Cleveland, Ohio, although for a brief time Editions d'Art Albert Skira had a subsidiary in New York City, Skira International Corporation, led by Henry Field, and Crown Publishers, Inc, New York handled them briefly in the early 1970s.

=== Editions d'Art Albert Skira book series of the 1950s and 1960s ===
With the success of the "Les Trésors de la Peinture Française" (1934–1952) and other series in France, Albert Skira planned and directed the publication of several ambitious series of books for an international market. These series systematically reviewed the art of European and beyond, some through national schools and art movements, others chronologically. Time Magazine characterized Skira as a "perfectionist" for his opulent publications made for a high-end market. Many of the leading art historians, archaeologists, and intellectuals of the time were commissioned to write the books, providing authoritative text. Unlike the majority of art history books up to that time, which if illustrated at all, were illustrated in black and white, Editions d'Art Albert Skira books were profusely illustrated with high quality color reproductions "tipped" into each volume. At that time, one of the Skira series "Painting, Color, History", was praised for the "notable achievement" of having all the illustrations in each volume in color, and the "quality of the color and of the paper and typography". They were sold in protective, plain cardboard slipcases with glossy illustrated dust jackets. The books were well constructed with embossed lettering on cloth or buckram covers, sturdy archival papers, and great attention to details. Most volumes in each collection were translated into multiple languages and available in French, English, and Italian editions, and often in German and Spanish "according to the market and the demand of the distributors".

Skira was praised as a "distinguished" publisher with "long lists of reputable, scholarly publications" to its credit. Albert Skira "brought his high standards to a mass audience" and along with the publications of just a few contemporaries (e.g. Cailler and Editions Tisné; Éditions Mazenod; Harry N. Abrams, Inc) ) his books played a role in the development of the coffee table book as known today. In her study on "the impact of Albert Skira in the post-war years on the art book" Corisande stated "It is because he was the creator that Albert Skira marked the history of the art book between 1950 and 1970, and established itself as a vital mediator between art and the public."

Swiss literary critic Jean Starobinski said "this man, who had the absolute eye, helped to make history." suggesting that the success of these book series in Europe and North America were a contributing influence and factor in determining what art and artist we consider important and how art is perceived today, as have others. Gaëtan Picon called to the series "the imaginary museum" and said these collections modified the relationship of painting with his audience, the general public, and Dufrêne said of Albert Skira and his series of the 1950s -1970s "the publisher is often more important than the author; format and layout more important than the text". Corisande discussed "the place held by Albert Skira and his books in the process of training public taste" and asked "Are they driving the formation of taste or are they devoted to contributing to an already established taste?"

=== Series and collections planned and directed by Albert Skira ===
==== Painting, Color, History: 23 volumes (1949–1972) [four additional volumes published by Skira/Rizzoli after 1972] ====
Over two decades in the making, the original series for an international audience was "An historical conspectus of the great schools of painting and the chief art movements, past and present" Many art historians of the 20th century were commissioned to write the books, including Otto Benesch, Anthony Blunt, Hans Bolliger, Jules David Brown, Albert Châtelet, Robert L. Delevoy, Enrique Lafuente Ferrari, Hanspeter Landolt, Jacques Lassaigne, Jean Leymarie, Jean- Amedeo Maiuri, Jacques Mayoux, Nello Ponente, Maynal Raynal, Barbara Rose, Werner Schmalenbach, Rosabianca Skira-Venturi, Arnold Rüdlinger, Jacques Thuillier, and Lionello Venturi. Fourteen of the 23 volumes were translated into English from French, Italian, and Spanish by literary scholar and translator Stuart Gilbert, one by Douglas Cooper (History of Modern Painting III), three were originally in English. They are large books (13.75 x 10 in.) with cloth covers embossed gilt-lettering. The covers vary in color: French blue, 12 volumes (French, Modern, Italian); light red, 5 volumes (Dutch, Flemish, German); others are shades from beige to brown. Some books feature foldout pages with color plates. Second editions of many volumes were published in the 1970s by Skira/Rizzoli International Publications, Inc., New York.

- American Painting I: From its Beginnings to the Armory Show. Jules David Brown (1969), 70 color plates, 145 pp.
- American Painting II: The 20th Century. Barbara Rose (1969), 60 color plates, 126 pp.
- Dutch Painting. Jean Leymarie (1956) 114 color plates, 213 pp.
- English Painting: From Hogarth to the Pre-Raphaelites. Jean-Jacques Mayoux and Sir Anthony Blunt. (1972). 130 color plates, 281 pp. [1st US ed. 1975 by Skira/St. Martin's Press, Inc. New York]
- Flemish Painting I: The Century of Van Eyck. Jacques Lassaigne (1957), 112 color plates, 183 pp.
- Flemish Painting II: From Bosch to Rubens. Jacques Lassaigne and Robert L. Delevoy. (1958), 112 color plates, 201 pp.
- French Painting I: From Fouquet to Poussin. Albert Châtelet and Jacques Thuillier (1963), 109 color plates, 245 pp.
- French Painting II: From Le Nain to Fragonard. Jacques Thuillier and Albert Châtelet. (1964), 106 color plates, 277 pp.
- French Painting III: The Nineteenth Century. Jacques Leymarie (1962), 109 color plates, 231 pp.
- German Painting I: Late Middle Ages (1350–1500). Hanspeter Landolt (1968), 72 color plates, 168 pp.
- German Painting II: From Dürer to Holbein. Otto Benesch (1966), 89 color plates, 198 pp.
- Goya: The Frescos in San Antonio de la Florida in Madrid. Enrique Lafuente Ferrari (1955), 42 color plates, 151 pp.
- The History of Modern Painting I: from Baudelaire to Bonnard. Maynal Raynal, (1949), 80 color plates, 151 pp.
- The History of Modern Painting II: Matisse, Munch, Rouault, Fauvism and Expressionism. Maynal Raynal, Jacques Lassaigne, Arnold Rüdlinger, and Hans Bolliger (1950), 88 color plates, 151 pp.
- The History of Modern Painting III: from Picasso to Surrealism. Maynal Raynal, Jacques Lassaigne, Arnold Rüdlinger, Hans Bolliger, and Werner Schmalenbach (1950), 112 color plates, 209 pp.
- Modern Painting. Maurice Raynal (1953), 200 color reproductions (not hand tipped), 339 pp.
- Modern Painting, Contemporary Trends: 1940–1960. Nello Ponente (1960). 100 color plates 215 pp.
- Italian Painting I: From The Origins to the Thirteenth Century. Amedeo Maiuri and Lionello Venturi (1959), 99 color plates, 199 pp.
- Italian Painting II: The Creators of the Renaissance. Lionello Venturi and Rosabianca Skira-Venturi. (1950), 103 color plates, 205 pp.
- Italian Painting III: The Renaissance. Lionello Venturi and Rosabianca Skira-Venturi (1951), 105 color plates, 168 pp.
- Italian Painting IV: From Caracaggio to Modigliani. Lionello Venturi and Rosabianca Skira-Venturi. (1952), 84 color plates, 174 pp.
- Spanish Painting I: From the Catalan Frescos to El Greco. Jacques Lassaigne (1952), 70 color plates, 138 pp.
- Spanish Painting II: From Velazquez to Picasso. Jacques Lassaigne (1952), 70 color plates, 148 pp.

==== Volumes published after Albert Skira's death ====
- Swiss Painting: From the Middle Ages to the Dawn of the Twentieth Century. Florens Deuchler, Marcel Roethlisberger, and Hans Lüthy. (1976), Skira/Rizzoli International Publications, Inc., New York. 65 color plates 198 pp.
- Catalan Painting I: The Fascination of Romanesque. J. A. De Lasarte (1990), Skira/Rizzoli International Publications, Inc., New York. 105 color plates, 152 pp.
- Catalan Painting II: from Gothic splendor to the Baroque. J A. De Lasarte (1991), Skira/Rizzoli International Publications, Inc., New York. 102 color plates, 161 pp.
- Catalan Painting III: From the Nineteenth to the Surprising Twentieth Century. J. A. De Lasarte (1992), Skira/Rizzoli International Publications, Inc., New York. 101 color plates, 154 pp.

===== The Great Centuries of Painting: 14 volumes (1950–1959) =====
This collection provides a historical overview of painting in Europe and western civilization, systematically surveying prehistoric cave painting at Lascaux, ancient Egypt, Greece, Rome, Byzantine, Medieval Europe, The Renaissance, to the end of nineteenth century. The authors include archeologists and art historians: Giulio Carlo Argan, Georges Bataille, André Grabar, Jacques Lassaigne, Amedeo Maiuri, Carl Nordenfalk, Massimo Pallottino, Maurice Raynal, Martin Robertson, and Lionello Venturi. Most volumes were originally written in French or Italian and translated into other languages. Nine of the 14 volumes were translated into English by literary scholar and translator Stuart Gilbert and the Lascaux volume by Austryn Wainhouse. The books have dark forest green, buckram covers with embossed gold gilt-lettering on the front and spines, and are in a quarto (4to) format, near square in dimensions (11.25 x 10 in./28.4 x 25.2 cm.). Many volumes have foldout pages supporting large or comparative sets of color plates. Second editions of some volumes were published in 1972, and paperback editions were published by Skira/Rizzoli later years.

- Prehistoric Painting, Lascaux or the Birth of Art. Georges Bataille (1955), 68 color plates, 151 pp.
- Egyptian Painting. Arpag Mekhitarian (1954), 95 color plates, 167 pp.
- Greek Painting. Martin Robertson (1959), 99 color plates, 195 pp.
- Etruscan Painting. Massimo Pallottino (1952), 64 color plates, 139 pp.
- Roman Painting. Amedeo Maiuri (1953), 84 color plates, 155 pp.
- Byzantine Painting. André Grabar (1953), 105 color plates, 203 pp.
- Early Medieval Painting, from the Fourth to the Eleventh Century. André Grabar and Carl Nordenfalk (1957), 98 color plates, 243 pp.
- Romanesque Painting, from the Eleventh to the Thirteenth Century. André Grabar and Carl Nordenfalk (1958), 99 color plates 231 pp.
- Gothic Painting. Jacques Dupont and Cesare Gnudi (1954), 110 color plates, 215 pp.
- The Fifteenth Century, Van Eyck to Botticelli. Jacques Lassaigne and Giulio Carlo Argan (1955), 116 color plates, 235 pp.
- The Sixteenth Century, Leonardo to El Greco. Lionello Venturi (1956), 152 color plates, 283 pp.
- The Seventeenth Century: The New Developments in Art from Caravaggio to Vermeer. Jacques Dupont and Francois Mathey (1951), 64 color plates, 136 pp.
- The Eighteenth Century, Watteau to Tiepolo. Francois Fosca (1952), 64 color plates, 147 pp.
- The Nineteenth Century: New Sources of Emotion, Goya to Gauguin. Maurice Raynal (1951), 69 color plates, 148 pp.

===== Treasures of Asia: 6 volumes (1960–1963) =====
A companion series to The Great Centuries of Painting (identical in format except the covers are yellow), presented as "the next step in our encyclopedic program of art publishing is to provide a comprehensive survey of painting in Asia". The authors were all highly regarded in their respective fields, including Basil Gray, Richard Ettinghausen, Akiyama Terukazu (National Institute of Art Researchers, Tokyo), Douglas Barrett (British Museum, London), and Mario Bussagli (University of Rome). James Cahill's volume on Chinese Painting is considered a classic text that for decades was required reading in Chinese art history classes. The volumes in this series were originally written in English, with the exception of Painting of Central Asia Vol. VI which was written in Italian and translated into English by Lothian Small. Second editions of some volumes were published in 1972, and paperback editions were published by Skira/Rizzoli later years.

- Chinese Painting Vol. I. James Cahill (1960), 100 color plates, 213 pp.
- Persian Painting Vol. II. Basil Gray (1961) 80 color plates, 191 pp.
- Japanese Painting Vol. III. Akiyama Terukazu (1961), 81 color plates, 219 pp.
- Arab Painting Vol IV. Richard Ettinghausen (1962) 81 color plates, 211 pp.
- Painting of India Vol. V. Douglas Barrett & Basil Gray (1963), 83 color plates, 215 pp.
- Painting of Central Asia Vol. VI. Mario Bussagli (1963), 68 color plates, 137 pp.

===== The Taste of Our Time: 57 volumes (1953–1972) =====
Promoted as "handy-sized" these small, relatively low priced books were designed for a wide audience without compromising Skira's high standards. Four "subseries" include Monographs (43 volumes), The Great Art Revolutions (6 volumes), Famous Places as Seen by Great Painters (4 volumes published with obis), and four unnumbered volumes on drawing were published 1967–71 as a promotional campaign, buy three regular numbered volumes from the series and get one drawing book free. Collectively more than 30 authors contributed to the series including Giulio Carlo Argan (2 volumes), Georges Bataille, Eugenio Battisti, Otto Benesch, Pierre Courthion (4 volumes), Robert L. Delevoy (4 volumes), Pierre Descargues (3 volumes), André Fermigier, Francois Fosca, Pierre Gassier, Enrique Lafuente Ferrari, Jacques Lassaigne (6 volumes), Jean Leymarie (6 volumes), Gaetan Picon, Terisio Pignatti, Nello Ponente, Maurice Raynal (2 volumes), Pierre Rosenberg, Denis Rouart (2 volumes), Claude Roy (3 volumes), Antoine Terrasse, Jacques Thuillier, Lionello Venturi (3), Patrick Waldberg, and many others. The books are near square in shape (6.25 x 7 in./15.9 x 17.8 cm.) with beige buckram covers, embossed gilt-lettering in red (monographs), blue (Art Revolutions), and black (Famous Places). Each book had 44-78 (most 50–65) color plates. Second editions appeared as early as the late 1950s (e.g. Degas 1958, Picasso 1959), with a few more 1968–1969, and many in 1972.

===== Famous Places as Seen by Great Painters (published with black obis) =====
- Montmartre, Vol. 16. P. Courthion (1956), 64 color plates, 143 pp.
- Paris in the Past: from Fouquet to Daumier, Vol. 20. P. Courthion (1957), 69 color plates, 151 pp.
- Paris in Our Time: Impressionism to the Present Day, Vol. 21. P. Courthion (1957), 70 color plates, 143 pp.
- Venice, Vol. 17. M. Brunetti, T. Pignatti, R. Pallucchini, and J. Lassaigne (1956), 78 color plates, 155 pp.

====== The Great Art Revolutions ======
- Cubism: Biographical and Critical Study, Vol. 27. G. Habasque (1959), 71 color plates. 171 pp.
- Fauvism: Biographical and Critical Study, Vol. 28. J. Leymarie (1959), 70 color plates, 165 pp.
- Impressionism I, before 1873: Biographical and Critical Study, Vol. 11. J. Leymarie (1955), 52 color plates, 119 pp.
- Impressionism II, after 1873: Biographical and Critical Study, Vol. 12. J. Leymarie (1955), 63 color plates, 139 pp.
- Romanticism, Vol. 36. P. Courthion (1961), 58 color plates, 139 pp.
- Surrealism, Vol. 37. P. Waldberg (1962), 65 plates (62 color), 151 pp.

====== Monographs ======
- Bonnard: Biographical and Critical Study, Vol. 42. A. Terrasse (1964), 54 color plates, 115 pp.
- Bosch: Biographical and Critical Study, Vol. 34. R. Delevoy (1960), 54 color plates, 143 pp.
- Botticelli: Biographical and Critical Study, Vol. 19. G. C. Argan (1957), 60 color plates, 147 pp.
- Braque, Vol. 35. J. Leymarie (1961), 53 color plates, 135 pp.
- Bruegel: Historical and Critical Study, Vol. 29. R. Delevoy (1959), 54 color plates, 155 pp.
- Carpaccio: Biographical and Critical Study, Vol. 24. T. Pignatti (1958), 54 color plates, 119 pp.
- Cézanne: Biographical and Critical Study, Vol. 8. M. Raynal (1954), 62 color plates, 139 pp.
- Chagall: Biographical and Critical Study, Vol. 18. L. Venturi (1956), 53 color plates, 123 pp.
- Chardin: Biographical and Critical Study, Vol. 40. P. Rosenberg (1963), 49 color plates, 127 pp.
- Corot: Biographical and Critical Study, Vol. 44. J. Leymarie (1966), 56 color plates, 139 pp.
- Courbet: Étude biographique et critique, Vol. 51. A. Fermigier (1971), 54 color plates, 142 pp. (no English edition)
- Daumier: Étude biographique et critique, Vol. 50. C. Roy (1971), 46 color plates, 127 pp. (no English edition)
- Degas: Biographical and Critical Studies, Vol. 5. F. Fosca (1954), 52 color plates, 107 pp.
- Dufy: Biographical and Critical Studies, Vol. 9. J. Lassaigne (1954), 54 color plates, 119 pp.
- Dürer: Biographical and Critical Study, Vol. 43. L. Grote (1965), 54 color plates, 143 pp.
- El Greco: Biographical and Critical Study, Vol. 15. P. Guinnard (1956), 53 color plates, 143 pp.
- Fra Angelico: Biographical and Critical Study, Vol. 10. G. C. Argan (1955), 49 color plates, 127 pp.
- Fragonard: Biographical and Critical Study, Vol. 46. J. Thuillier (1967), 48 color plates, 159 pp.
- Gauguin: Biographical and Critical Studies, Vol. 1. C. Estienne (1953), 51 color plates, 115 pp.
- Giotto: Biographical and Critical Study, Vol. 32. E. Battisti (1960), 54 color plates, 147 pp.
- Goya: Biographical and Critical Study, Vol. 13. P. Gassier (1955), 57 color plates, 139 pp.
- Frans Hals: Biographical and Critical Study, Vol. 48. P. Descargues (1968), 42 color plates, 147 pp.
- Ingres: Biographical and Critical Study, Vol. 47. G. Picon (1967), color 52 color plates, 131 pp.
- Kandinsky: Biographical and Critical Study, Vol. 41. J. Lassaigne (1964), 50 color plates, 131 pp.
- Klee: Biographical and Critical Study, Vol. 31. N. Ponente (1960),54 color plates, 143 pp.
- Lautrec: Biographical and Critical Studies, Vol. 3. J. Lassaigne (1953), 50 color plates, 121 pp.
- Le Douanier Rousseau: Étude biographique et critique, Vol. 52. P. Descargues (1972), 47 color plates, 155 pp. (no English edition)
- Leger: Biographical and Critical Study, Vol. 38. R. Delevoy (1962), 50 color plates, 143 pp.
- Manet: Biographical and Critical Study, Vol. 14. G. Bataille (1955), 53 color plates, 135 pp.
- Matisse: Biographical and Critical Study, Vol. 30. J. Lassaigne (1959), 57 color plates, 139 pp.
- Miro: Biographical and Critical Study, Vol. 39. J. Lassaigne (1963), 50 color plates, 143 pp.
- Modigliani. Vol. 23. C. Roy (1958), 57 color plates, 135 pp.
- Monet: Historical and Critical Study, Vol. 25. D. Rouart (1958), 52 color plates, 131 pp.
- Picasso: Biographical and Critical Studies, Vol. 4. M. Raynal (1953), 63 color plates, 135 pp.
- Picasso 1950-1968: Historical and Critical Study, Vol. 49. P. Dufour (1969), 50 color plates, 139 pp.
- Piero Della Francesca: Biographical and Critical Studies, Vol. 6. L. Venturi(1954), 57 color plates, 127 pp.
- Rembrandt: Biographical and Critical Study, Vol. 22. O. Benesch (1957), 56 color plates, 155 pp.
- Renoir: Biographical and Critical Studies, Vol. 7. D. Rouart (1954), 56 color plates, 119 pp.
- Rouault: Biographical and Critical Study, Vol. 26. L. Venturi (1959), 58 color plates, 143 pp.
- Rubens: Biographisch-Kritische Studie, Vol. 53. L. Delevoy (1972), 55 color plates, 201 pp. (no English edition)
- Van Gogh: Critical Study, Vol. 2. C. Estienne (1953), 55 color plates, 127 pp.
- Velazquez: Biographical and Critical Study, Vol. 33. E. Lafuente Ferrari (1960), 54 color plates, 131 pp.
- Vermeer: Biographical and Critical Study, Vol. 45. P. Descargues (1966), 55 color plates, 147 pp.

====== Drawings (special promotion unnumbered volumes, published with green obis) ======
- Chagall Unpublished Drawings. J. Lassaigne (1968), 44 color plates, 95 pp.
- Daumier Dessins. C. Roy (1971), 61 color plates, 103 pp. (no English edition)
- Impressionist Drawings From Manet To Renoir. J. Leymarie (1969), 51 color plates, 104 pp.
- Picasso Drawings. J. Leymarie (1967), 51 illustrations, 44 tipped in plates, 107 pp.

===== The Treasures of the World: 8 volumes (1962–1970) =====
This collection was "Created by Albert Skira for Horizon Magazine" and focuses on the architecture, fine art, and decorative arts of various cultures or cities. The authors include art historians and archeologist including Ekrem Akurgal, Maurizio Calvesi, Francisco Javier Sánchez Cantón, Alexandre Cirici-Pellicer, Deoclecio Redig de Campo, Richard Ettinghausen, André Grabar, Samuel Kirkland Lothrop, Cyril Mango, Aly Mazahéri, Michelangelo Murano. These are large folio books (13 x 10-1/2 in.) with red cloth covers embossed with gold gilt-lettering and include both black & white, and color tipped-in plates.

- Treasures of the Vatican: St Peter's Basilica, The Vatican Museums and Galleries, The Treasure of St Peter's, The Vatican Grottoes and Necropolis, the Vatican Palaces. Maurizio Calvesi and Deoclecio Redig de Campos (1962), 120 plates/85 color, 207 pp.
- The Treasures of Venice: the Church of St Mark's, the treasure of St Mark's, the Ducal Palace, the Gallerie Dell'accademia, the Architecture and Monuments of Venice. Michelangelo Murano and André Grabar (1963). 126 plates/? color, 218 pp.
- The Treasures of Ancient America: The Arts of the Pre-Columbian Civilizations from Mexico to Peru. Samuel Kirkland Lothrop (1964). 145 plates/85 color, 230 pp.
- Treasures of Spain II: From Charles V to Goya. Alexandre Cirici-Pellicer and Francisco Javier Sanchez Canton (1965), ? plates/? color, 236 pp.
- The Treasures of Turkey: The earliest civilizations of Anatolia Byzantium the Islamic Period. Cyril Mango, Ekrem Akurgal, and Richard Ettinghausen (1966). ? plates/86 color, 253 pp.
- Treasures of Spain I: From Altamira to the Catholic Kings. Alexandre Cirici-Pellicer and Francisco Javier Sanchez Canton (1967), 124 plates/? color, 249 pp.
- The Treasures of the Pharaohs: The Early Period, The New Kingdom, The Late Period. Jean Yoyotte (1968). 120 plates/85 plates, 260 pp.
- The Treasures of Iran: Medes and Persians, Treasures Of The Magi, The Iranian Renaissance. Aly Mazahéri (1970), ? plates/87 color, 300 pp.

===== Art, Ideas, History: 10 volumes (1964–1969) =====
Although heavily skewed to painting, this series expands coverage to encompass sculpture, architecture, and other visual arts, and to place that art into the broader social, political, philosophical, and historical context of the period that it was produced in. The authors include Georges Duby, André Chastel, Giulio Carlo Argan, Jean Starobinski, Eugénie De Keyser, Nello Ponente, and Robert L. Delevoy. These books are in a quarto (4to) format (9 3/4 x 12 1/8 in.), and originally came with black obis wrapped around the dust jackets, with transparent dust jacket protectors, all in white cloth slipcases. Originally planned as a 14 volume series with the titles promoted on the dust jackets of the published volumes, the first four volumes never materialized: Oriental Empires to Greek City States 1183-480 B.C., by P. Amandrym; Hellenism to Rome 480-88 B.C., by J. Marccadé; Five Centuries of Roman Art 88 B.C.-525 A.D., by E. Will; Rise of Byzantium 500-1050, by C. Brandi).

- The Making of the Christian West 980–1140. Georges Duby (1967), 71 color plates, 214 pp.
- Europe of the Cathedrals, 1140–1280. Georges Duby (1966), 71 color plates, 220 pp.
- Foundations of a New Humanism 1280–1440. Georges Duby (1966), 72 color plates, 222 pp.
- The Myth of the Renaissance 1420–1520. André Chastel (1969), 66 color plates, 231 pp.
- The Crisis of the Renaissance 1520–1600. André Chastel (1968), 67 color plates, 217 pp.
- Europe of the Capitals 1600–1700. Giulio Carlo Argan (1964), 64 color plates, 222 pp.
- The Invention of Liberty 1700–1789. Jean Starobinski (1964), 63 color plates, 222 pp.
- The Romantic West, 1789–1850. Eugenie de Keyser (1965), 64 color plates, 210 pp.
- The Structures of the Modern World 1850–1900. Nello Ponente (1965), 66 color plates, 210 pp.
- Dimensions of the Twentieth Century 1900–1945. Robert L. Delevoy (1965), 73 color plates, 224 pp.

== Skira after its founder's death ==
After the early death of the firm's founder, Albert Skira, in 1973, the firm was sold to Flammarion and then to Edipresse before returning to the ownership of the Skira family.

In 1996 the firm was acquired by the Italian publishing group Einaudi and later by Mondadori and its head office was moved to the Palazzo Casati Stampa in Milan.
