= Jacques Lassaigne =

French art historian and critic

Jacques Lassaigne (born in Paris on 17 December 1911; died on 10 February 1983) was a French art historian, art critic and museum curator. He served as the president of the International Association of Art Critics from 1966 to 1969 and was the chief curator of the Musée d'Art Moderne de la Ville de Paris from 1971 to 1978. Lassaigne's books and museum exhibitions, accompanied by catalogues and essays, constitute a significant contribution to art history.

Lassaigne was a prolific author, writing numerous scholarly books on art history, often in collaboration with the publisher Albert Skira and his publishing house, Editions D'Art Albert Skira, during the 1950s and 1960s. Many of these works were translated into English, Italian, German, and Spanish, and published internationally.

== A partial list of books sole authored by Jacques Lassaigne ==
- Daumier (1938), Hyperion Press (French and European Publications, Inc.), Paris, France (New York, NY), 168 pp.
- Toulouse Lautrec (1946) Hyperion Press, Paris, 167 pp.
- Cent chefs d'oeuvre des peintres de l'École de Paris (1947), Éditions de la Galerie Charpentier, Paris, 211 pp.
- Goya (1948), Hyperion Press, Paris, 79 pp.
- Eugéne Delacroix (1950), Les Editions Braun et Cie, Paris, 20 pp.
- Spanish Painting I: From the Catalan Frescos to El Greco (1952), Editions D'Art Albert Skira, Geneva, 138 pp.
- Spanish Painting II: From Velazquez to Picasso (1952), Editions D'Art Albert Skira, Geneva, 148 pp.
- Lautrec: Biographical and Critical Studies (1953), Editions D'Art Albert Skira, Geneva, 121 pp.
- Dictionnaire de la Peinture Moderne (1954), [Editor J. Lassaigne]. Hazan, Paris.
- Dufy: Biographical and Critical Studies (1954), Editions D'Art Albert Skira, Geneva, 119 pp.
- Flemish Painting I: The Century of Van Eyck (1957), Editions D'Art Albert Skira, Geneva, 183 pp.
- Matisse: Biographical and Critical Study (1959), Editions D'Art Albert Skira, Geneva, 139 pp.
- Miro: Biographical and Critical Study (1963), Editions D'Art Albert Skira, Geneva, 143 pp.
- Kandinsky: Biographical and Critical Study (1964), Editions D'Art Albert Skira, Geneva, 131 pp.
- Marc Chagall: the Ceiling of the Paris Opera: Sketches, Drawings, and Paintings (1966), Frederick A. Praeger Publishers, New York, 89 pp.
- Chagall: Unpublished Drawings (1968), Editions D'Art Albert Skira, Geneva, 95 pp.
- Impressionism (1969), Heron, London, 208 pp.
- El Greco (1973), Thames and Hudson, London, 264 pp.
- Les Ménines: Vélasquez: Musée du Prado (1973), Office Du Livre, Fribourg, Suisse, 57 pp.
- Un entretien avec Georges Braque (1973), XXe Siècle, 41.
- Vincent Van Gogh (1974), Diffusion Princesse, Paris, 95 pp.
- Toulouse-Lautrec And The Paris Of The Cabarets (1975), Lamplight Pub, New York. 99 pp.
- Francisco Zúñiga: Sculpture, Drawings, Lithographs (1982), by Francisco Zúñiga; Jacques Lassaigne. Brewster Fine Arts Ltd., New York, 124 pp.

== A partial list of books co-authored by Jacques Lassaigne ==
- History of Modern Painting, Vol. II (1950), by M. Raynal, H. Bolliger, J. Lassaigne, A. Rüdlinger, and G. Schmidt. Editions D'Art Albert Skira, Geneva, 151 pp.
- The History of Modern Painting Vol III (1950), M. Raynal, J. Lassaigne, W. Schmalenbach, A. Rudilinger, and H. Bollinger. Editions D'Art Albert Skira, Geneva, 209 pp.
- The Fifteenth Century, Van Eyck to Botticelli (1955) by J. Lassaigne and G. C. Argan. Editions D'Art Albert Skira, Geneva, 235 pp.
- Venice (1956), by M. Brunetti, T. Pignatti, R. Pallucchini, and J. Lassaigne. Editions D'Art Albert Skira, Geneva, 155 pp.
- Flemish Painting II: From Bosch to Rubens (1958), by J. Lassaigne, and R. L. Delevoy. Editions D'Art Albert Skira, Geneva, 201 pp.
- Marc Chagall: drawings and water colors for the ballet (1969), by M. Chagall and J. Lassaigne. Tudor Publishing Company, New York, 155 pp.
- Tout l'oeuvre peint de Degas (1974). J. Lassaigne and F. Minervino. Flammarion, Paris 152 pp.
- Vieira da Silva (1978), by J. Lassaigne and G. Weelen. Éditions Cercle d'art. 343 pp.
- Rufino Tamayo (1982), by O. Paz and J. Lassaigne. Rizzoli International Publications.
