= Jean-Pierre Richard =

French writer and literary critic (1922–2019)

- Born: 15 July 1922; Marseille, France
- Died: 15 March 2019 (aged 96); Paris, France
- Occupation: literary critic

Jean-Pierre Richard (15 July 1922 – 15 March 2019) was a French literary critic.

== Biography ==
Jean-Pierre Richard began his advanced studies at the École Normale Supérieure, at the time a school of the University of Paris, in 1941, passed the "agrégation" in literature in 1945, and got his doctoral degree (doctorat ès lettres) in 1962 at the University of Paris. He taught literature first in foreign universities, and then in France, and finally became a professor at the University of Paris IV in 1978.

Since the publication of Littérature et Sensation in 1954, which brought him critical attention, Jean-Pierre Richard has continually sought to explore – in the works of writers of the nineteenth and twentieth century – the links between their writings and their intimate experience of the world. In his first book, which studied Stendhal, Flaubert, Fromentin and the Goncourt brothers, he analyzed these authors' perceptions and sensations of material world. In Poésie et Profondeur, he refined his critical method by searching for the "first moment of literary creation", that instant during which a literary project constructs both the writer and his or her work. Published in 1962, Richard's "Univers imaginaire de Mallarmé" remains one of the most important studies of that poet.

He worked closely with Georges Poulet and is sometimes grouped with the so-called "Geneva School" including writers such as Georges Poulet, Albert Béguin, Jean Starobinski and Jean Rousset.

== Main works ==
- Chemins de Michon Paris (Verdier poche, 2008)
- Roland Barthes, dernier paysage (Verdier, 2006) on Roland Barthes
- Quatre lectures (Fayard, 2002)
- Proust et le monde sensible (Seuil, 1974) on Marcel Proust
- Onze études sur la poésie moderne (Seuil, 1964) on Pierre Reverdy, Saint-John Perse, René Char, Paul Éluard, Georges Schehadé, Francis Ponge, Eugène Guillevic, Yves Bonnefoy, André du Bouchet, Philippe Jaccottet, and Jacques Dupin.
- L'Univers imaginaire de Mallarmé (Seuil, 1962).
- Poésie et profondeur (Seuil, 1955) on Arthur Rimbaud, Baudelaire, Gérard de Nerval and Paul Verlaine.
- Littérature et Sensation (Seuil, 1954) on Stendhal, Flaubert, Fromentin and the Goncourt brothers.

== Sources ==
- Jean-Claude Mathieu (ed.), Territoires de l'imaginaire : pour Jean-Pierre Richard, Paris, Le Seuil, 1986.
