= Albert Thibaudet =

French essayist and literary critic

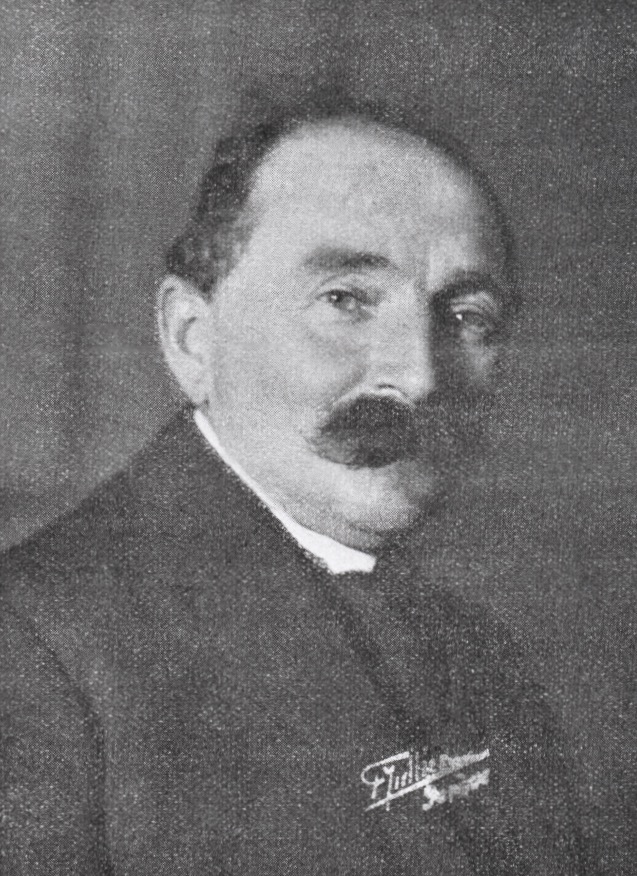
- Thibaudet in 1930
- Born: 1 April 1874; Tournus, Saône-et-Loire, French Third Republic
- Died: 16 April 1936 (aged 62); Geneva, Switzerland
- Genre: Literary criticism

Albert Thibaudet (French: [tibodɛ]; 1 April 1874 – 16 April 1936) was a French essayist and literary critic. A former student of Henri Bergson, he was a professor of Jean Rousset. He taught at the University of Geneva, and was the co-founder of the Geneva School of literary criticism. He was succeeded in his post by Marcel Raymond.

== Career ==
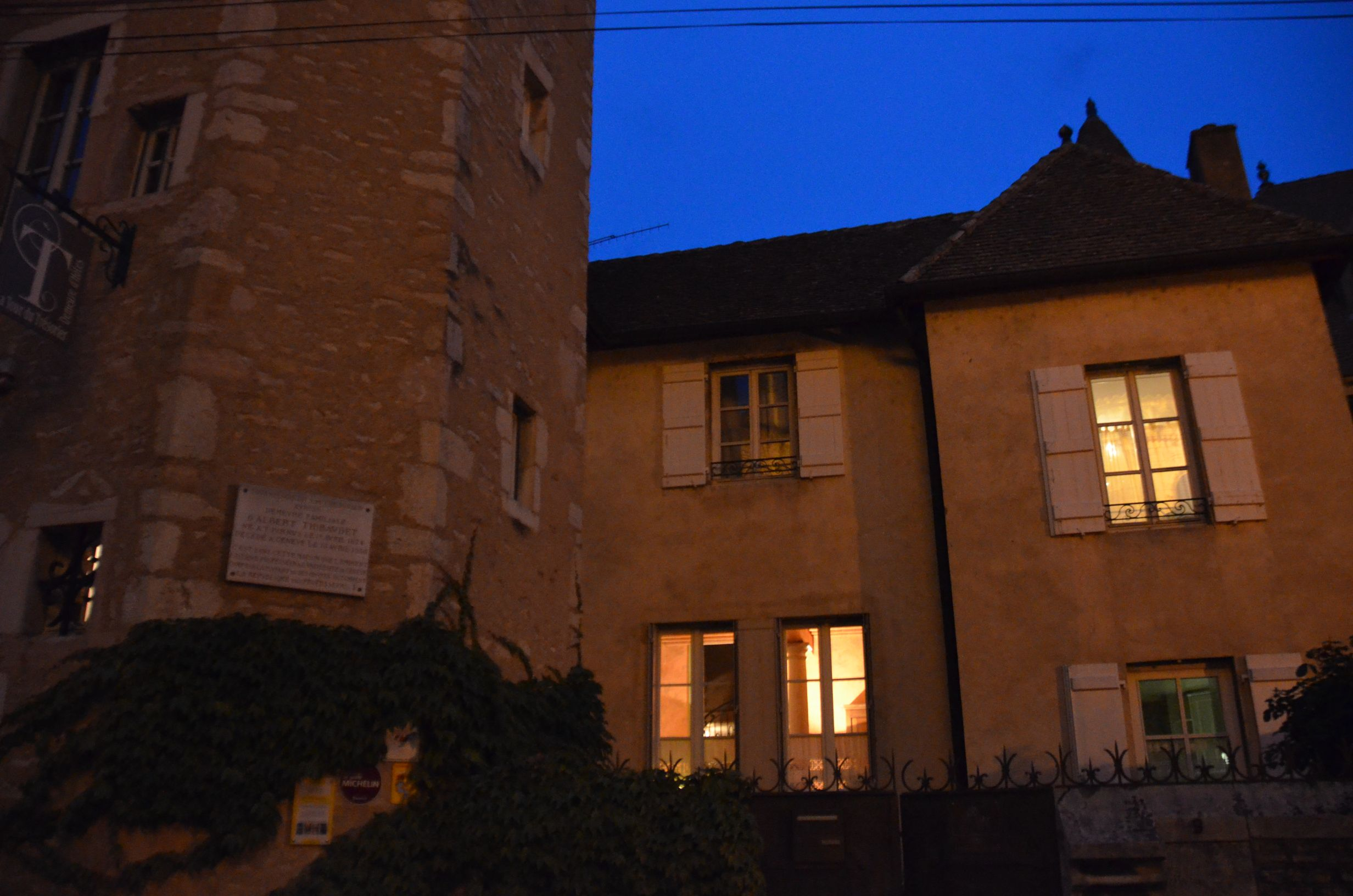
Birthplace at Tournus

In 1874, he was born in Tournus and when eight, sent to the Lycée Lons-le-Saunier. Afterward, his father sent him to the Lycée Louis-le-Grand to complete humanities; a year later, he went to Lycée Henri-IV, where he met Henri Bergson. He defied his father and continued studying humanities instead of moving to the Ecole Normale. His university career led him to being associate professor at Lons-le-Saunier, Carpentras, Draguignan, Abbeville, and Blois.

Thibaudet's reputation increased through 1920s and 1930s, in part for his regular articles in the Nouvelle Revue Française which he wrote from 1912 until his death, as well as for his numerous books.

In 1928, the philosopher Lucien Lévy-Bruhl sponsored him to participate in the first of the Cours universitaires de Davos, international meetings of intellectuals at Davos, Switzerland.

In 2008, the Thucydides Centre (a research institute of the Paris Panthéon-Assas University) inaugurated the "Albert Thibaudet Prize", awarded to a French-language writer on international relations.

== Works ==
- La Campagne avec Thucydide, 1922 (on Thucydides)
- Gustave Flaubert, 1922, republished, 1936
- Le Bergsonisme, 1923 (on Henri Bergson)
- La république des professeurs, B. Grasset, Paris 1927
- Physiologie de la critique, 1930
- Les idées politiques en France, 1931
- Histoire de la littérature française - de 1789 à nos jours, 1936
