= Marcel Raymond =

Swiss literary critic

Marcel Raymond (December 20, 1897, Geneva – November 28, 1981, Geneva) was a Swiss literary critic who specialized in French literature. He is generally grouped with the so-called "Geneva School".

== Biography ==
Marcel Raymond first studied in Geneva, and then moved to France to study at the Sorbonne in Paris under the scholars Henri Chamard (a specialist in La Pléiade) and Abel Lefranc. He received his doctorate in 1927 with a dissertation on the influence of Pierre de Ronsard on French poetry (1550–1585); published shortly after, the work has become a classic (it was republished in 1965). Raymond's subsequent study of French poetry from the end of the nineteenth century to the beginning of the twentieth – De Baudelaire au surréalisme (1933) – brought him universal critical praise. In it he developed the idea that poetry is a fully engaged act and that a poem should be appreciated as an organic production that requires an intimate act of reading.

Raymond taught at the University of Leipzig, at the University of Basel and, in 1936, succeeded Albert Thibaudet at the University of Geneva, where he would stay until his retirement in 1962. At Geneva, he became friends with Georges Poulet and Albert Béguin, and along with Jean Starobinski and Jean Rousset they formed the core of what would come to be called the Geneva School of literary criticism.

During the Second World War, Raymond lost his father and several friends (including Benjamin Crémieux who died in a concentration camp), but he poured himself into essays, critical editions and anthologies on Montesquieu, Agrippa d'Aubigné, Victor Hugo and Paul Valéry. After the war, this work continued on Pierre Bayle, Pierre de Ronsard, Arthur Rimbaud, Paul Verlaine, Senancour, Baudelaire, etc. But the majority of his post-war work was focused on Jean-Jacques Rousseau, and he was asked to participate with Bernard Gagnebin on the critical edition of Rousseau's works for the Bibliothèque de la Pléiade. His 1955 book, Baroque et renaissance poétique would complete his work on 16th and 17th century poetry.

In 1962 he retired from teaching. His wife died in 1963. His later work comprises both poetry (Poèmes pour l'absente dedicated to his wife), autobiographical works (Le Sel et la cendre, Souvenirs d'un enfant sage), fragments of a diary (Le Trouble et la présence, Écrit au crépuscule), philosophical reflection (Par-delà les eaux sombres), literary theory (Vérité et poésie, Être et dire) and studies on Senancour, Fénelon and Jacques Rivière.

In all of his work on French poetry and on Jean-Jacques Rousseau, the fundamental principle of Raymond's approach was a focus on the ways literature comes out of a contemplative discovery of the self within the world.

== Works ==
- 1928 – Ronsard's influence on French poetry (1550–1585) (republished 1965)
- 1933 – De Baudelaire au surréalisme (republished 1940)
- 1942 – Génies de France (anthology)
- 1945 – Paul Valéry et la tentation de l'esprit (essay) (reedited 1964)
- 1948 – Le Sens de la qualité
- 1952 – Anthologie de la nouvelle française (anthology)
- 1955 – Baroque et renaissance poétique
- 1964 – Vérité et poésie
- 1967 – Fénelon
- 1968 – with J.A. Steele, La poésie française et le maniérisme, 1546–1610 (anthology)
- 1970 – Être et dire
- 1970 – Le Sel et la cendre (autobiographical
- 1971 – Mémorial José Corti
- Correspondence with Georges Poulet (1950–1977)
- 1975 – Par-delà les eaux sombres
- 1976 – Souvenirs d'un enfant sage (autobiography)
- 1977 – Le Trouble et la présence
- 1980 – Écrit au crépuscule
