= Raymonde Vincent =

French writer

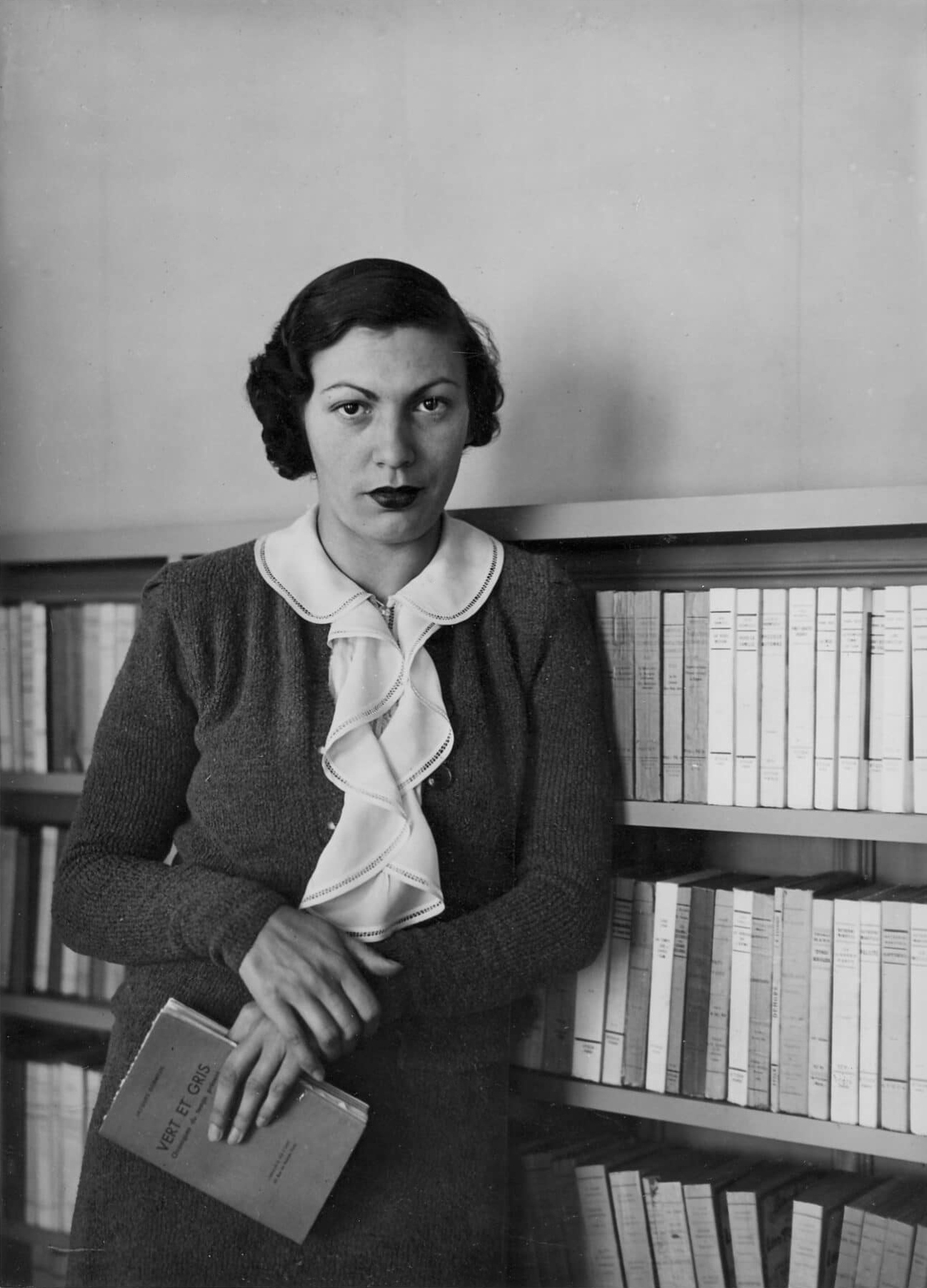
- Raymonde Vincent, 1937
- Born: 23 September 1908; Luant, Indre, France
- Died: 5 January 1985 (aged 76); Saint-Chartier, Indre, France
- Spouse: Albert Béguin
- Writing career
- Language: French
- Notable work: Campagne (1937)
- Notable awards: Prix Femina (1937)

Raymonde Vincent (French pronunciation: [ʁɛmɔ̃d vɛ̃sɑ̃]; 23 September 1908 – 5 January 1985) was a French writer. She won the Prix Femina in 1937 for her novel Campagne.

== Biography ==
A native of Berry, Raymonde Vincent was born near Luant near Châteauroux in Indre, into a family of farmers. After the death of her mother, she kept house for her father, a métayer operating a farm belonging to a castle. Apart from learning the catechism, her formal education was neglected. At seventeen she left for Paris, where she found a job in commerce while posing as a model for artists, among them Alberto Giacometti. Making up for her lack of formal education, she took an active interest in music, literature and the arts, frequenting literary circles and becoming familiar with writers such as Louis Aragon, Georges Bernanos and Jean Giraudoux. In 1926, she met Albert Béguin, a Swiss literary scholar specializing in German Romanticism who would become a renowned essayist, critic and translator. Béguin and Vincent married in Switzerland in 1929.

It was nostalgia for her peasant past that inspired her most outstanding work Campagne, for which the Prix Femina was awarded to her in 1937. She continued to write several novels, such as Blanche (1939), Elisabeth (1943), Les noces du matin (1950) and La couronne des innocents (1962); none of these, however, reached the acclaim of Campagne. During World War II, Vincent and her husband Béguin were involved with the French Resistance. After the war, Vincent divorced Béguin; while the latter was on his deathbed in 1957, she travelled to Italy, where he then lived, to bid him farewell. She then definitively relocated to her native Indre and lived in Saint-Chartier until her death in 1985.

== Work ==
- 1937: Campagne (Éditions Stock); awarded the Prix Femina
- 1939: Blanche, (Éditions Stock)
- 1943: Elisabeth (Éditions Stock)
- 1945: Seigneur, retirez-moi d'entre les morts (Éditions Egloff)
- 1950: Les noces du matin (Éditions du Seuil)
- 1962: La couronne des innocents (Éditions du Seuil)
- 1977: Les Terres heureuses (Éditions Julliard)
- 1982: Le Temps d'apprendre à vivre (Éditions de La Bouinotte)
- 1991: Hélène, series "Voyage immobile" (Éditions Christian Pirot) (posthumous)
