= Luant =

- Commune
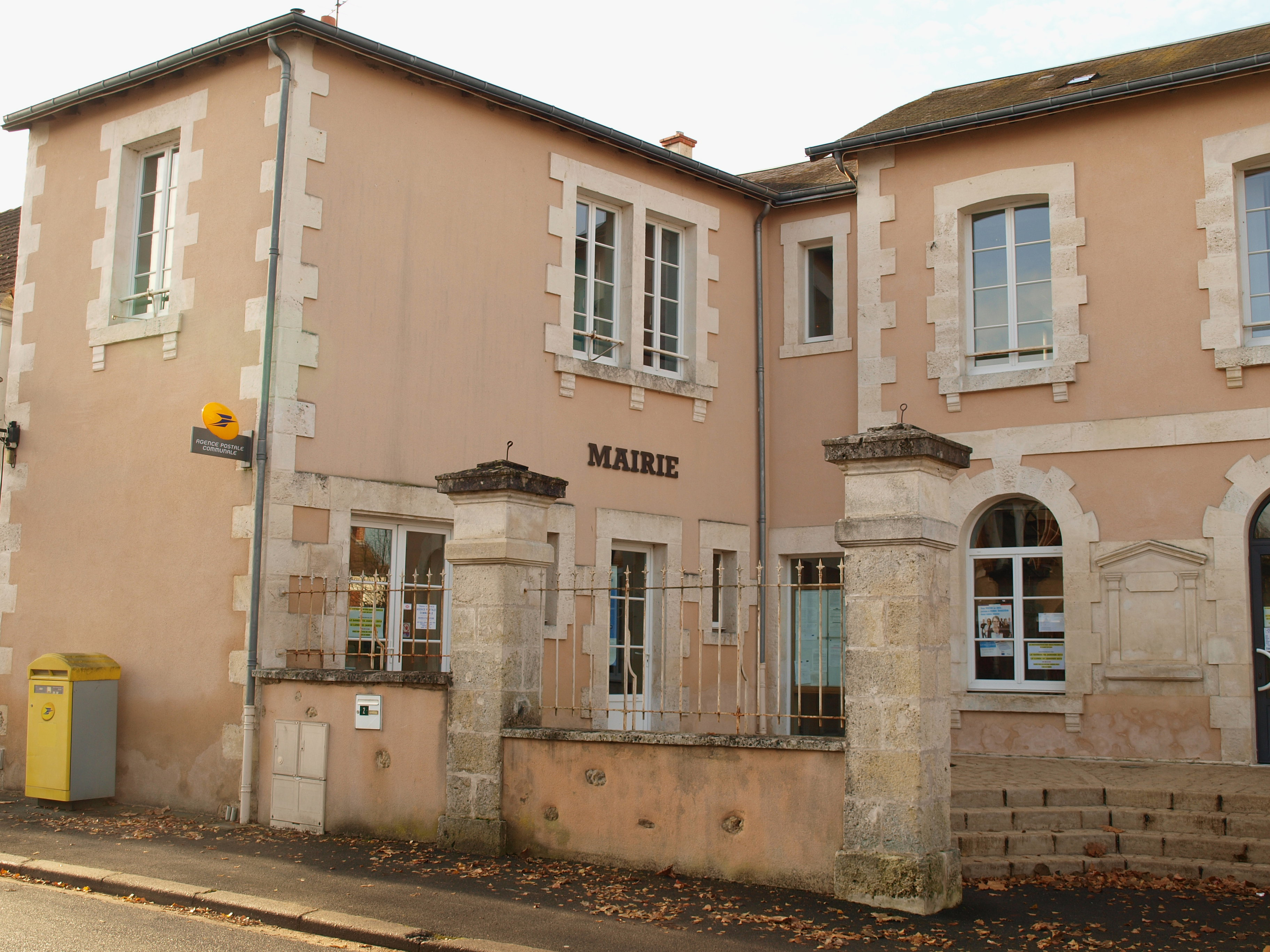
- The town hall in Luant
- Location of Luant
- Location within France Location within Centre-Val de Loire
- Coordinates: 46°44′02″N 1°33′34″E
- Country: France
- Region: Centre-Val de Loire
- Department: Indre
- Arrondissement: Châteauroux
- Canton: Saint-Gaultier
- Intercommunality: CA Châteauroux Métropole

Government
  - Mayor (2020–2026): Didier Duvergne
- Area^{1}: 31.06 km^{2} (11.99 sq mi)
- Elevation: 140 m (460 ft)
- Highest elevation: 181 m (594 ft)
- Lowest elevation: 129 m (423 ft)
- Population (2023): 1,604
  - Density: 51.64/km^{2} (133.8/sq mi)
- Time zone: UTC+01:00 (CET)
  - Summer (DST): UTC+02:00 (CEST)
- INSEE/Postal code: 36101 /36350
- ^{1} French Land Register data, which excludes lakes, ponds, glaciers > 1 km^{2} (0.386 sq mi or 247 acres) and river estuaries.

Luant (French pronunciation: [lɥɑ̃]) is a commune in the Indre department in central France. The writer Raymonde Vincent (1908–1985), winner of the Prix Femina in 1937, was born in Luant.

== Geography ==
The commune is located in the parc naturel régional de la Brenne.

== Population ==
Historical population
Year	Pop.	±% p.a.
1968	772	—
1975	832	+1.07%
1982	1,029	+3.08%
1990	1,241	+2.37%
1999	1,280	+0.34%
2007	1,354	+0.71%
2012	1,444	+1.30%
2017	1,504	+0.82%
2023	1,604	+1.08%
Source: INSEE

== See also ==
- Communes of the Indre department
