= Pierre Béguin =

Swiss journalist and editor

- Born: 19 November 1903; La Chaux-de-Fonds, Switzerland
- Died: 23 January 1978 (aged 74); Lausanne, Switzerland
- Education: University of Geneva (law)
- Occupations: Journalist, editor
- Spouse: Hermine Dvorak
- Relatives: Albert Béguin (brother)

Pierre Béguin (19 November 1903 – 23 January 1978) was a Swiss journalist and editor. He was one of the best editorial writers in French-speaking Switzerland and a vigorous champion of freedom of the press.

== Early life and education ==
Béguin was born on 19 November 1903 in La Chaux-de-Fonds to Charles-Marcel Béguin, a pharmacist, and Marthe Vuille. He was the brother of Albert Béguin. He studied law at the University of Geneva.

== Career ==
After beginning his career as an editor for the Annuaire de la Société des Nations (Yearbook of the League of Nations), Béguin became a correspondent in Bern for La Liberté and the Journal de Genève from 1930 onwards. Between 1934 and 1940, he also provided a chronicle of the Federal Palace for the Swiss shortwave radio service.

In 1946, Béguin was appointed editor-in-chief of the Gazette de Lausanne, and served as its director from 1959 to 1966. He was one of the best editorial writers in French-speaking Switzerland and an energetic champion of freedom of the press.

In 1950, Béguin published Le Balcon sur l'Europe (The Balcony on Europe), a history of Switzerland during World War II.

== Personal life ==
Béguin was Protestant and from Rochefort. He married Hermine Dvorak. He died on 23 January 1978 in Lausanne.

== Bibliography ==
- Le Balcon sur l'Europe (1950)
