= Gaëtan Picon =

French author

Gaëtan Picon (19 September 1915 – 6 August 1976) was a French author: essayist, art and literature critic, and art and literature historian. He was director of the Mercure de France and Director-General of Arts and Letters under André Malraux. He wrote an entry for the Encyclopaedia Universalis on Swiss publisher Albert Skira.

== Selected bibliography ==
- Balzac: Balzac par lui-même. (1956). Microcosme ecrivains de toujou. Editions du Seui, Paris. 191 pp.
- Ingres: Biographical and Critical Study (1967) The Taste of Our Time, Vol. 47. Editions d'Art Albert Skira, Geneva 131 pp.
- The Work of Jean Dubuffet (1973). Albert Skira, Geneva. 233 pp.
- Surrealists and Surrealism 1919-1939 (1977). Skira/Rizzoli International Publications, Inc., New York. 231 pp.
- Birth Of Modern Painting (1978). Rizzoli International Publications, Inc., New York. 135 pp.
- Jean-Auguste-Dominique Ingres (1980). Published by Skira/Rizzoli International Publications, Inc., New York. 151 pp.
