= Coffee table book =

Large illustrated hardback book

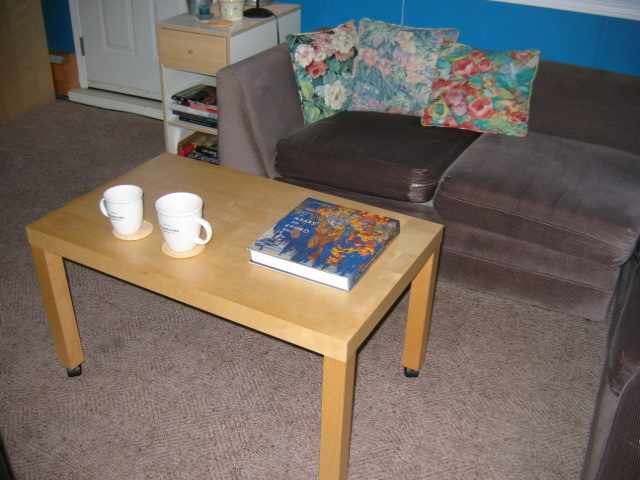
Coffee table book on a coffee table

A coffee table book, also known as a cocktail table book, is an oversized, usually hard-covered book whose purpose is for display on a table intended for use in an area in which one entertains guests and which can serve to inspire conversation or pass the time. Subject matter is predominantly non-fiction and pictorial (a photo-book). Pages consist mainly of photographs and illustrations, accompanied by captions and small blocks of text, as opposed to long prose. Since they are aimed at anyone who might pick up the book for a light read, the analysis inside is often more basic and with less jargon than other books on the subject.

== History ==
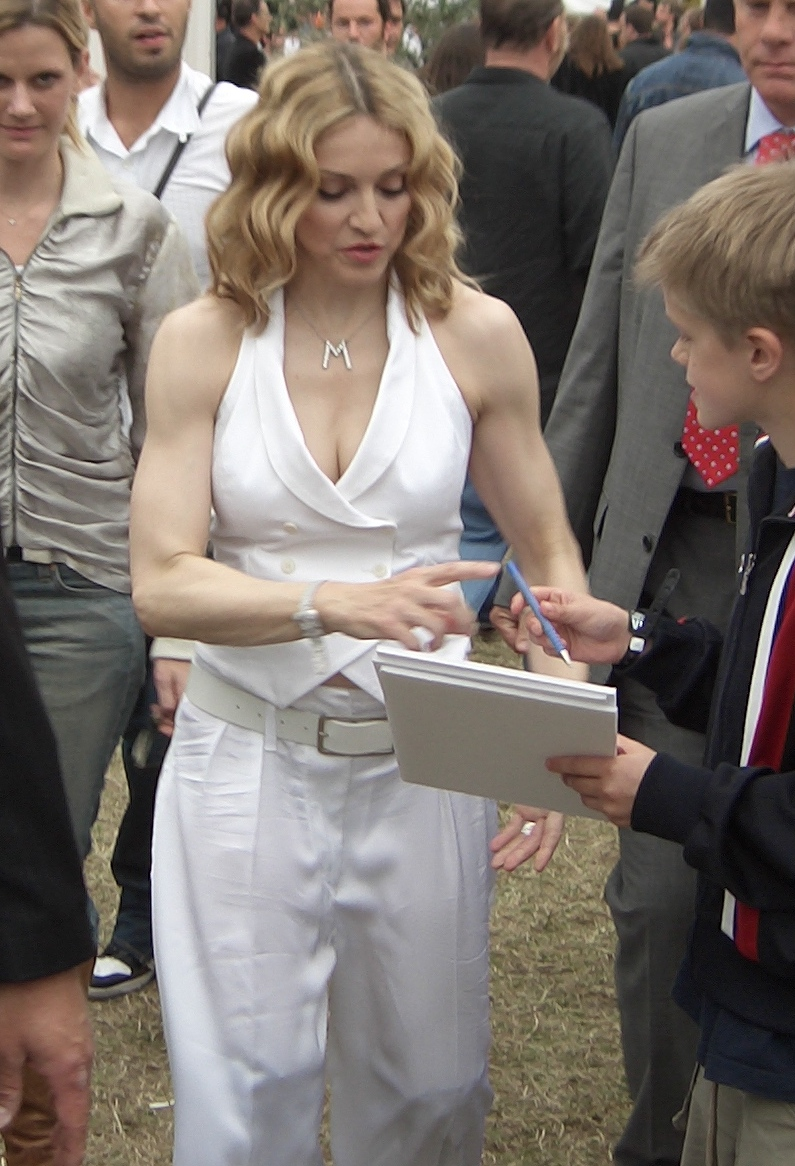
According to different estimations, the 1992 book Sex by Madonna (pictured) is both the fastest-selling and best-selling coffee table book in publishing history.

The concept of a book intended essentially for display over perusal was mentioned by Michel de Montaigne in his 1581 essay "Upon Some Verses of Virgil": "I am vexed that my Essays only serve the ladies for a common movable, a book to lay in the parlor window..." Almost two centuries later, Laurence Sterne in his 1759 comic novel The Life and Opinions of Tristram Shandy, Gentleman advanced the more lighthearted view that "As my life and opinions are likely to make some noise in the world, and... be no less read than the Pilgrim's Progress itself—and, in the end, prove the very thing Montaigne dreaded his Essays should turn out, that is, a book for a parlour window..."

Beginning in the late 1940s, publisher Albert Skira and a few others, such as Cailler and Editions Tisné, Éditions Mazenod, and Harry N. Abrams, began producing large folio and quarto (4to) format art books, illustrated with tipped-in color plates, that were significant in the development of coffee table books as known today.

David Brower is sometimes credited with inventing the modern coffee table book. While serving as executive director of the Sierra Club, he had the idea for a series of books that combined nature photography and writings on nature, with, as he put it, "a page size big enough to carry a given image's dynamic. The eye must be required to move about within the boundaries of the image, not encompass it all in one glance." The first such book, This Is the American Earth, with photographs by Ansel Adams and others and text by Nancy Newhall, was published in 1960; the series became known as the "Exhibit Format" series, with 20 titles eventually published.

The term "coffee table book" appeared in Arts Magazine in 1961, and in the title of The Coffee Table Book of Astrology, published in 1962.

They have also found uses in propaganda, such as a book on the life of East German leader Walter Ulbricht and another on Albanian leader Enver Hoxha.

As of 2011, Madonna's 1992 book Sex remained the most searched for out-of-print coffee table book.

== As media tie-in publications ==
=== Video games ===
Video games are sometimes accompanied by coffee table books—often referred to as art books or artbooks—featuring concept art, which can serve as a second opportunity for studios to commercially benefit from designers' work after its initial development purpose has been completed. As promotional materials, artbooks can be used as special incentives to pre-order a game, or as anniversary merchandise to showcase an ongoing franchise. They often include unfinished work, or materials that were cut from the game during its development. Some artbooks choose not to credit designers by name, treating their creative contributions as "below the line", while others include image-by-image credits and even quotations from the artists. Video game artbooks vary in the level of written information that is included; when the art is accompanied by writing, it tends to prioritize fan-pleasing production trivia.

Historically, artbooks were not common accompaniments to the first video games in the 1970s, which instead emphasized the visual art on arcade cabinets, game cartridges, and box art. The first book publications to feature extensive game-related art were strategy guides, which included no pre-production material and were not primarily aesthetic. A thesis by Mauri Rahkila argues that the first "proper forms of art books" about video games developed in the 1990s, with one early example being Capcom Illustrations (1995).

=== Movies ===
In film, coffee table books contribute to the "world-making" through which a movie is extended into a media franchise. By allowing closer examination of the film's visual design and explaining additional worldbuilding details, they encourage audiences to grow attached to the general setting of a film rather than its specific storyline, and thus promote a market for more works and merchandise related to that setting. According to the media scholar Henry Jenkins, the 1982 film Blade Runner is sometimes identified as the origin of this artistic strategy, in which art direction becomes core to a film's appeal even as it "could only be fully appreciated by reading through the coffee-table books that accompany the release of such films".

== See also ==
- Artist's book
- Livre d'art

== Book sources ==
- Morton, Andrew (2002). Madonna. Macmillan Publishers. ISBN 0-312-98310-7.
