= J. Hillis Miller =

American literary critic and professor (1928–2021)

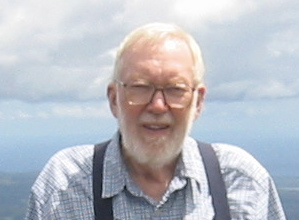
- Born: Joseph Hillis Miller; March 5, 1928; Newport News, Virginia, U.S.
- Died: February 7, 2021 (aged 92); Sedgwick, Maine, U.S.
- Occupation: Literary critic
- Known for: Advancing literary deconstruction as means to study literature
- Spouse: Dorothy James (m. 1949; died 2021)
- Children: 3
- Relatives: J. Hillis Miller Sr. (father)

Academic background
- Education: Harvard University, Oberlin College

Academic work
- Institutions: Johns Hopkins University, Yale University, University of California, Irvine
- Doctoral students: Stuart Moulthrop

Joseph Hillis Miller Jr. (March 5, 1928 – February 7, 2021) was an American literary critic and scholar who advanced theories of literary deconstruction. He was part of the Yale school along with scholars including Paul de Man, Jacques Derrida, and Geoffrey Hartman, who advocated deconstruction as an analytical means by which the relationship between literary text and the associated meaning could be analyzed. Through his career, Miller was associated with the Johns Hopkins University, Yale University, and University of California, Irvine, and wrote over 50 books studying a wide range of American and British literature using principles of deconstruction.

== Early life ==
Miller was born in Newport News, Virginia, on March 5, 1928, to Nell Martin (née Crizer) and J. Hillis Miller Sr. His mother was a homemaker and his father a Baptist minister who was professor of psychology at the College of William & Mary, and would go on to serve as the president of the University of Florida.

Miller graduated from Oberlin College (BA summa cum laude, 1948) switching his major of study from Physics to English. He started his masters at Harvard University. During this time, he contracted polio and was noted to have completed his dissertation writing with his left hand, having lost the ability to use his right hand. He completed his master's degree from the university in 1949 and his PhD in 1952.

== Career ==
Miller started his career as a member of the faculty at Johns Hopkins University, Baltimore, in 1953. During this time, Miller was heavily influenced by fellow Johns Hopkins professor and Belgian literary critic Georges Poulet and the Geneva School of literary criticism, which Miller characterized as "the consciousness of the consciousness of another, the transposition of the mental universe of an author into the interior space of the critic's mind." This was also the time that he was introduced to Paul de Man, who was a member of the faculty at Johns Hopkins as well as Jacques Derrida, a visiting professor, with whom he would remain associated.

In 1972, he joined the faculty at Yale University where he taught for fourteen years. At Yale, he worked alongside prominent literary critics Paul de Man and Geoffrey Hartman, where they were collectively known as the Yale School of deconstruction, in contention with prominent Yale influence theorist Harold Bloom.

By this time, Miller had emerged as an important humanities and literature scholar specializing in Victorian and Modernist literature, with a keen interest in the ethics of reading and reading as a cultural act. At one time, he was supervising at least 14 doctoral dissertations studying Victorian literature.

In 1986, Miller left Yale to work at the University of California, Irvine, where he was later followed by his Yale colleague Derrida. During the same year, he served as President of the Modern Language Association, and was honored by the MLA with a lifetime achievement award in 2005. In 2004, he was elected to the American Philosophical Society. Both at Yale and UC Irvine, Miller mentored an entire generation of American literary critics including noted queer theorist Eve Kosofsky Sedgwick. He was Distinguished Research Professor of English and Comparative Literature at the University of California Irvine until 2001.

After his retirement, he wrote over 15 books and many articles in journals and was also active on the international lecturing circuit. He also served on dissertation committees in his retirement supervising dissertations and doctoral theses works at UC Irvine, University of California, Berkeley, and the University of Queensland.

=== Role as a deconstructionist ===
Miller was associated with a group of scholars including Paul de Man, Jacques Derrida, and Geoffrey Hartman, collectively referred to as the Yale School, who advanced deconstruction, an analytical approach of associating and drawing linkages between literary text and the associated meaning. The theory espoused that words and texts had linkages to other expressed words and texts. These built on ideas and themes that Derrida and de Man had brought along from Europe, while Miller joined them. He applied these techniques to a range of American and British works, including prose as well as poetry. Throughout his career, he would go on to write over 35 books and many articles in journals advancing these themes.

Miller defined the movement as searching for "the thread in the text in question which will unravel it all", and said that there are multiple layers to any text, both its clear surface and its deep countervailing subtext:

On the one hand, the "obvious and univocal reading" always contains the "deconstructive reading" as a parasite encrypted within itself as part of itself. On the other hand, the "deconstructive" reading can by no means free itself from the metaphysical reading it means to contest.

Miller's "The Critic as Host" could be viewed as a reply to M. H. Abrams, who presented a paper, "The Deconstructive Angel," at a session of the Modern Language Association in December 1976, criticizing deconstruction and the methods of Miller. Miller presented his paper just after Abrams's presentation at the same session. He made the case that words and text lacking objective outside or providing meaning didn't mean they were the "prison-house of language," but, instead, they were a "place of joy" where the critics had the freedom to associate and provide various possibilities eventually guiding the meaning. The movement continued to gain popularity through the next decade, presenting a paper called "Triumph of Theory" at the 1986 session of the Modern Language Association. He was also noted to have made the topic of deconstruction more accessible to a wider audience by publishing in magazines including Newsweek, and The New York Times Magazine.

He was also a defender of the movement in the late 1980s when deconstruction was losing some of its popularity. He advanced ideas that he termed 'ethics of learning' where he countered critics by arguing that it was the reader's obligation to try and find meaning in the text even when it appeared impossible.

== Personal life ==
Miller married Dorothy James in 1949, and remained married until her death in January 2021. The couple had two daughters and a son. Miller died from COVID-19 on February 7, 2021, the month after Dorothy's death, at his home in Sedgwick, Maine; he was 92.

== Books ==
- (1958) Charles Dickens: The World of His Novels
- (1963) The Disappearance of God: Five Nineteenth-Century Writers
- (1965) Poets of Reality: Six Twentieth-Century Writers
- (1968) The Form of Victorian Fiction: Thackeray, Dickens, Trollope, George Eliot, Meredith, and Hardy
- (1970) Thomas Hardy, Distance and Desire
- (1971) Charles Dickens and George Cruikshank
- (1982) Fiction and Repetition: Seven English Novels
- (1985) The Linguistic Moment: from Wordsworth to Stevens
- (1985) The Lesson of Paul de Man
- (1987) The Ethics of Reading: Kant, de Man, Eliot, Trollope, James, and Benjamin
- (1990) Versions of Pygmalion
- (1990) Victorian Subjects
- (1990) Tropes, Parables, Performatives: Essays on Twentieth Century Literature
- (1991) Theory Now and Then
- (1991) Hawthorne & History: Defacing It
- (1992) Ariadne's Thread: Story Lines
- (1992) Illustration
- (1995) Topographies
- (1998) Reading Narrative
- (1999) Black Holes
- (2001) Others
- (2001) Speech Acts in Literature
- (2002) On Literature
- (2005) The J. Hillis Miller Reader
- (2005) Literature as Conduct: Speech Acts in Henry James
- (2009) The Medium is the Maker: Browning, Freud, Derrida, and the New Telepathic Ecotechnologies
- (2009) For Derrida
- (2011) The Conflagration of Community: Fiction Before and After Auschwitz
- (2012) Reading for Our Time: Adam Bede and Middlemarch Revisited
- (2014) Communities in Fiction
- (2015) An Innocent Abroad: Lectures in China
- (2016) Thinking Literature Across Continents (with Ranjan Ghosh)

== See also ==
- List of thinkers influenced by deconstruction
- The logical technique of Ariadne's thread
