= Cahiers du Rhône =

Swiss cultural review (1942–1958)

- Editor: Albert Béguin (1942–1957)
- Categories: Cultural review
- Publisher: Hermann Hauser (La Baconnière, Neuchâtel)
- Founded: March 1942
- Final issue: 1958
- Country: Switzerland
- Language: French

Cahiers du Rhône was a cultural magazine founded in March 1942 and directed by Albert Béguin until his death in 1957. The review ceased publication in 1958.

== History ==
During World War II, the Cahiers played an important role for publishing in Romandy and, sometimes clandestinely, for French publishing that was muzzled by fascism and Pétainism. Between 1942 and 1945, the review was resolutely turned towards occupied France: Paul Éluard published his poem Liberté there, Louis Aragon published Les yeux d'Elsa, and numerous renowned writers and artists were regular contributors.

The Cahiers, which comprised three series (red, white and blue, like the French flag), were published from 1942 by Hermann Hauser (La Baconnière Editions, Neuchâtel).

== Bibliography ==
- F. Frey-Béguin, Les Cahiers du Rhône, "refuge de la pensée libre", cat. expo. La Chaux-de-Fonds, 1993
- O. Cariguel, Les Cahiers du Rhône dans la guerre (1941–1945), 1999
