= Saint-Chartier =

- Commune
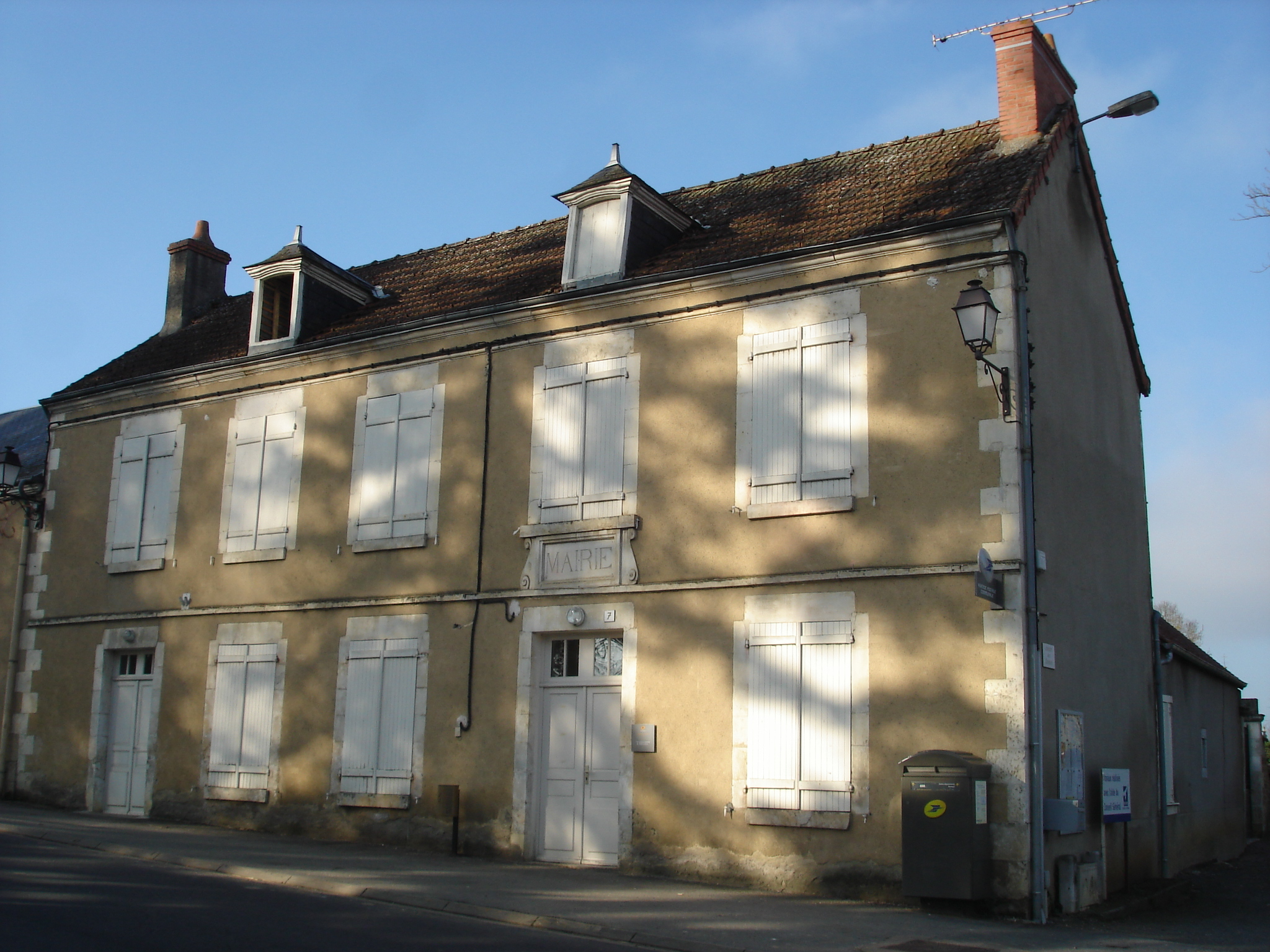
- The town hall in Saint-Chartier
- Location of Saint-Chartier
- Location within France Location within Centre-Val de Loire
- Coordinates: 46°39′02″N 1°58′41″E
- Country: France
- Region: Centre-Val de Loire
- Department: Indre
- Arrondissement: La Châtre
- Canton: La Châtre
- Intercommunality: La Châtre et Sainte-Sévère

Government
  - Mayor (2020–2026): Damiel Guérin
- Area^{1}: 27.7 km^{2} (10.7 sq mi)
- Elevation: 187 m (614 ft)
- Highest elevation: 271 m (889 ft)
- Lowest elevation: 181 m (594 ft)
- Population (2023): 458
  - Density: 16.5/km^{2} (42.8/sq mi)
- Time zone: UTC+01:00 (CET)
  - Summer (DST): UTC+02:00 (CEST)
- INSEE/Postal code: 36184 /36400
- ^{1} French Land Register data, which excludes lakes, ponds, glaciers > 1 km^{2} (0.386 sq mi or 247 acres) and river estuaries.

Saint-Chartier (French pronunciation: [sɛ̃ ʃaʁtje]) is a commune in the Indre department in central France. The writer Raymonde Vincent (1908–1985), winner of the Prix Femina in 1937 died in Saint-Chartier.

== Population ==
Historical population
Year	Pop.	±% p.a.
1968	683	—
1975	555	−2.92%
1982	561	+0.15%
1990	548	−0.29%
1999	540	−0.16%
2007	600	+1.33%
2012	574	−0.88%
2017	510	−2.34%
2023	458	−1.78%
Source: INSEE

== See also ==
- Communes of the Indre department
