= Geneva school (literary criticism) =

School of literary criticism

The Geneva School (French: groupe de Genève) was a group of literary critics in the 1950s and 1960s, of which the most important were the Belgian critic Georges Poulet, the French critic Jean-Pierre Richard, and the Swiss critics Marcel Raymond, Albert Béguin, Jean Rousset and Jean Starobinski. The critics Emil Staiger, Gaston Bachelard, and J. Hillis Miller are also sometimes associated with this group.

Growing out of Russian Formalism and Phenomenology (such as in the work of Edmund Husserl), the "Geneva School" used the phenomenological method to attempt to analyse works of literature as representations of deep structures of an author's consciousness and his or her relationship to the real world. Biographical criticism was however avoided, as these critics focused primarily on the work of art itself – treated as an organic whole and considered a subjective interpretation of reality (the German concept of Lebenswelt) – and sought out the recurrent themes and images, especially those concerning time and space and the interactions between the self and others.
