= Jean Rousset =

Swiss literary critic (1910–2002)

Jean Rousset (20 February 1910, Geneva – 15 September 2002, Geneva) was a Swiss literary critic who worked on French literature, and in particular on Baroque literature of the late Renaissance and early seventeenth century. He is grouped with the Geneva School and with early structuralism.

== Biography ==
Jean Rousset began his studies in law before changing to literature. He studied under Albert Thibaudet and Marcel Raymond and after working as a French lecturer in Halle and Munich, became a professor at the University of Geneva. His thesis on French literature of the baroque period, published under the title La Littérature de l’âge baroque en France : Circé et le paon, was an immense critical success. It was one of the first studies to use the term "baroque" – which had been, up to that point, used exclusively in art history – to refer to literary works. Under the signs of the sorceress Circe and the ornamental peacock (paon), and following the art historical analysis of Heinrich Wölfflin, Rousset explored movement, instability, ostentation, decoration and metamorphosis in the plays, novels and poetry of the period. He would return to the same period in his L’Intérieur et l’extérieur : essais sur la poésie et le théâtre au XVII^{e} siècle.

His 1963 work, his book Forme et signification explored new theoretical possibilities; Jacques Derrida has called it one of the principal works of early structuralism. Distancing himself from the phenomenological approach of his friends and associates Georges Poulet and Jean-Pierre Richard, Rousset focused on formal elements such as narrative structure in determining the meaning of a work. He would continue on this formal and narratological approach in his Narcisse romancier : essai sur la première personne dans le roman (which explored the role of first person narration in novels) and Le Lecteur intime. In this way, his work of this period shares many characteristics with the work of Gérard Genette.

His later works of theory and criticism were, however, less centered on a purely structural approach. His "Leurs yeux se rencontrèrent" : la scène de première vue dans le roman explored the common place of "love at first sight" in the novel. His last book, Dernier regard sur le baroque, was a final assessment of theory and theoretical debates concerning the baroque period.

== Works ==
- 1953 - La Littérature de l’âge baroque en France: Circé et le paon
- 1963 - Forme et signification, essais sur les structures littéraires de Corneille à Claudel
- 1968 - L’Intérieur et l’extérieur: essais sur la poésie et le théâtre au XVIIe siècle - on Jean de Sponde and Jean de La Ceppède
- 1972 - Narcisse romancier: essai sur la première personne dans le roman - on first person narration in novels
- 1981 - "Leurs yeux se rencontrèrent": la scène de première vue dans le roman
- 1986 - Le Lecteur intime, de Balzac au journal
- 1988 - Anthologie de la Poésie baroque française - anthology
- 1990 - Passages, échanges et transpositions
- 1998 - Dernier regard sur le baroque

== Sources ==
- Jean Rousset site on José Corti editions (in French)
