= Tipped-in page =

In the book trade, pages printed apart

In the book trade, a tipped-in page or tipped-in plate is a page that is printed separately from the main text of the book, but attached to the book. The page may be glued onto a regular page or even bound along with the other pages. There are various reasons for tipped-in-pages, including photographic prints and reviews.

== Description ==
A tipped-in page or, if it is an illustration, tipped-in plate, is a page that is printed separately from the main text of the book, but attached to the book. A tipped-in page may be glued onto a regular page, or even bound along with the other pages. It is often printed on a different kind of paper, using a different printing process, and of a different format than a regular page. Tipped-in pages that are glued to a bound page on its inner side may be called paste ins.

Some authors include loose pages inserted into a book as tipped-in, but in this case, it is usually called an insert instead.

== Tissue guard ==
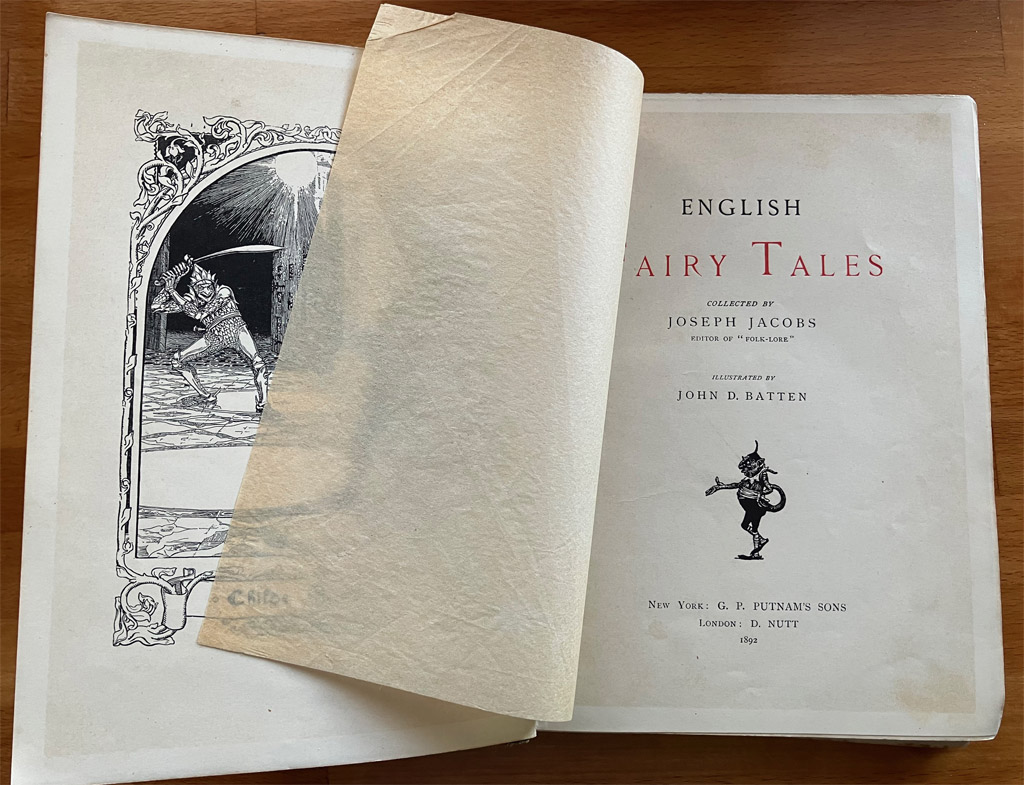
An example of a tissue guard

A tissue guard is a tipped-in page consisting of a sheet of thin, often semi-transparent paper that is inserted facing an illustration or plate image, primarily to prevent its ink from transferring onto the opposite page. It is usually added after the book is bound.

Tissue guards were once important because early book illustrations were commonly printed separately from the text, often by a different process such as lithography that employed a greasy ink that could transfer onto a facing page over time. Illustrations made with modern inks seldom require tissue guards and so they are not commonly found in modern books.

Tissue guards were commonly used in conjunction with a book frontispiece, but were also sometimes used with illustrations elsewhere within the book if the bookbinder felt they were needed. Most were made of a semi-transparent tissue paper similar to glassine or onionskin, although some were merely made of a thinner paper that achieved a similar effect.

== Use ==
Typical uses of tipped-in pages added by the publisher include:

- color illustrations, generally printed using a different process (e.g. intaglio or lithography) and on different paper
- an author's signature, signed on a blank or preprinted page, before the book is bound
- original photographic prints
- maps, often larger than the book format and folded to fit
- coupons, advertisements, or reply cards
- errata sheets, only produced after the printing run
- a short addendum
- a replacement for a missing, damaged, or incorrectly printed page

Owners of books may also tip in such items as:

- a letter from the author
- a review

== Examples ==
Coffee table art books featuring high quality tipped-in color plates were popular starting in the late 1940s and into the 1980s. Examples include several large series of books on painting published by Editions d'Art Albert Skira, Geneva: e.g. Painting, Color, History (23 volumes 1949–1972); The Great Centuries of Painting (14 volumes 1950–1959); The Taste of Our Time (57 volumes 1953–1972) with "hand-tipped colorplates".

Harry N. Abrams, Inc., New York also published many fine art books during this period with tipped-in plates, examples include the 56 volume series The Library of Great Painters published 1959–1985 with each book having ca. 48 "tipped-on colorplates" or "hand-tipped plates in full color".
