= Poésies (Mallarmé collection) =

1887 poetry collection by Stéphane Mallarmé

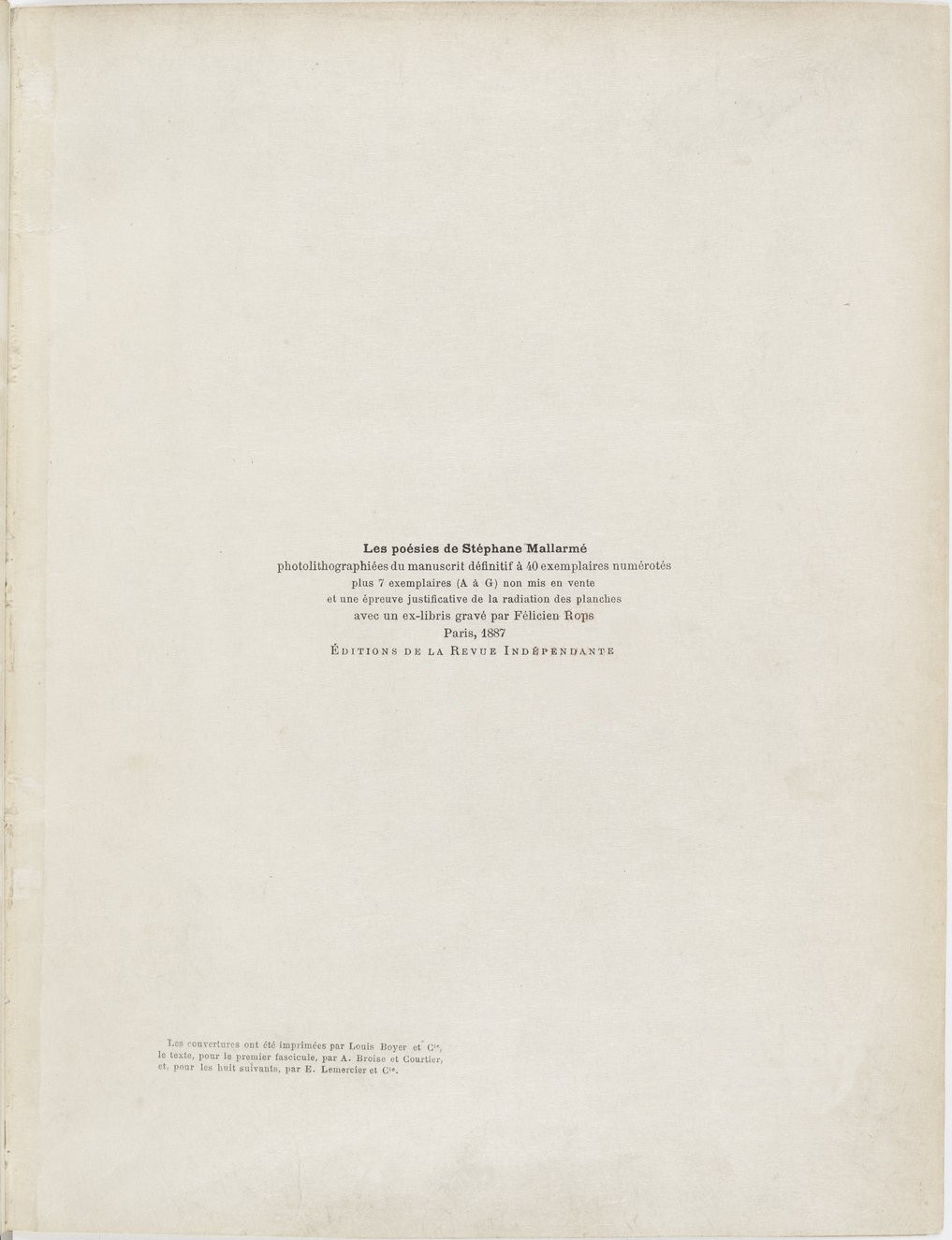
- First edition title page
- Author: Stéphane Mallarmé
- Translator: Arthur Symons
- Illustrator: Félicien Rops
- Language: French
- Publisher: La Revue indépendante
- Publication date: 1887
- Publication place: France
- English publication date: 1986
- Pages: 143

Poésies is an 1887 poetry collection by the French writer Stéphane Mallarmé.

== Publication ==
Poésies was first published in 1887 by La Revue indépendante. It was republished by Edmond Deman in 1899, the year after Mallarmé's death; this edition included an additional section where Mallarmé wrote about the background and circumstances under which most of the poems had been written. The book was translated to English by Arthur Symons, and first published in its entirety in 1986 by Tragara Press.

== See also ==
- Symbolism (movement)
