= Albert Béguin =

Swiss French scholar and literary critic (1901–1957)

Albert Beguin
- Born: 17 July 1901; La Chaux-de-Fonds, Neuchatel, Switzerland
- Died: 3 May 1957 (aged 55); Rome, Lazio, Italy
- Occupations: Linguist; Translator; Writer; Literary critic
- Spouse: Raymonde Vincent

Albert Béguin (17 July 1901 – 3 May 1957) was a Swiss academic and translator. He married French writer Raymonde Vincent, winner of the Prix Femina in 1937. He is grouped with the Geneva School.

== Early life and education ==
Béguin was born on 17 July 1901 in La Chaux-de-Fonds, Switzerland, the son of Charles-Marcel Béguin, a pharmacist, and Marthe Vuille. He was the brother of Pierre Béguin. Born Protestant, Béguin converted to Catholicism in 1940. He married Raymonde Vincent, a novelist.

After studying classical literature in Geneva, Béguin went to Paris where he discovered and translated into French certain works of the German Romantics, including Jean Paul, E.T.A. Hoffmann, and Eduard Mörike. From 1929 to 1934, he served as a lecturer of French at the University of Halle.

== Academic career ==
Béguin defended his doctoral thesis in Geneva in 1937. Published in France, it achieved considerable success under the title L'Âme romantique et le rêve: essai sur le romantisme allemand et la poésie française (1937). The same year, Béguin was appointed professor of French literature at the University of Basel. He would resign from his chair in 1946 to move to Paris.

His courses at Basel reflected his personal preoccupations: the spiritual dimension of poetic creation (in Claudel or Nerval), existential anxiety (in Léon Bloy or Bernanos), and the lost paradise (in Alain-Fournier).

== Editorial work ==
From 1942, Béguin created and directed the Cahiers du Rhône, published by Hermann Hauser in Boudry (La Baconnière). Through this initiative, he committed to supporting the struggle of French writers during the war by publishing works by Péguy, Supervielle, and Emmanuel Mounier, defending the values of Christian France at the heart of a threatened Europe.

Following Mounier's death in 1950, Béguin took over the direction of the journal Esprit in Paris, where he consistently attempted to defend the creative freedom of writers. He held this position until his death in 1957, which occurred after several years devoted to travels, notably to India and the United States.

== Literary criticism ==
Béguin was the author of numerous works of criticism, including Léon Bloy, mystique de la douleur (1948), L'Ève de Péguy (1948), and Patience de Ramuz (1950), which won the Prix Rambert.

== Death ==
Béguin died on 3 May 1957 in Rome.

== Bibliography ==
=== Selected works ===
- L'Âme romantique et le rêve: essai sur le romantisme allemand et la poésie française (1937)
- Léon Bloy, mystique de la douleur (1948)
- L'Ève de Péguy (1948)
- Patience de Ramuz (1950)

=== Sources ===
- Béguin, B. and P. Grotzer, Les archives Albert Béguin (1975)
- P. Grotzer, "Étapes d'Albert Béguin", in Civitas, no. 7, 1976-1977
- Pierre Grotzer, Existence et destinée d'Albert Béguin, La Baconnière, 1977.
- B. Ackermann, "Albert Béguin face à la montée des périls", in Le goût de l'histoire, des idées et des hommes (1996), pp. 155-182
- Francillon, Littérature, 3, pp. 523-526
- J. Borie, ed., De l'amitié: hommage à Albert Béguin (1901-1957) (2001)
