= Jean Starobinski =

Swiss literary critic (1920–2019)

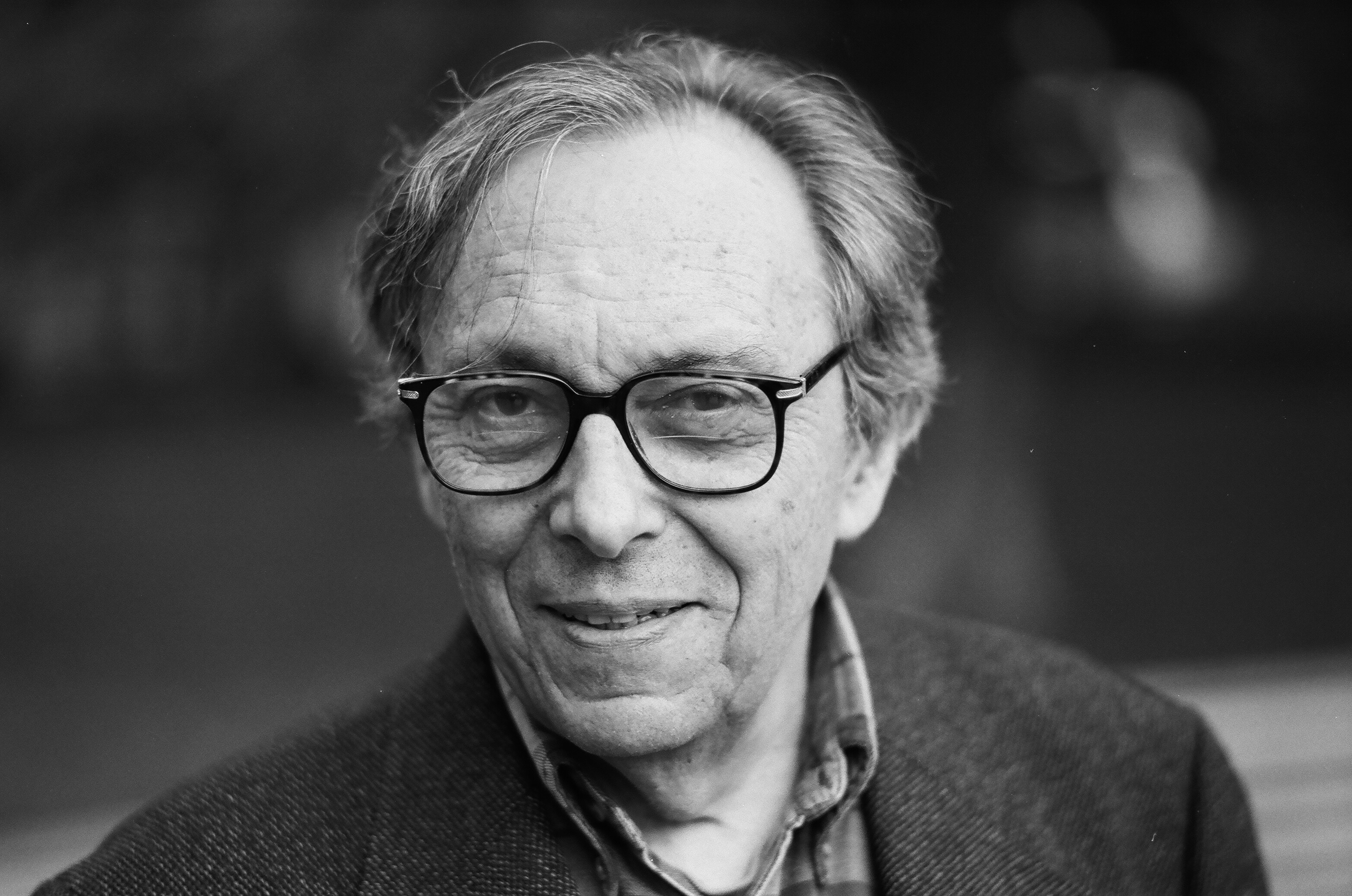
- Born: 17 November 1920; Geneva, Switzerland
- Died: 4 March 2019 (aged 98); Morges, Switzerland
- Occupation: Literary critic
- Notable work: Montesquieu

Jean Starobinski (17 November 1920 – 4 March 2019) was a Swiss literary critic.

== Biography ==
Starobinski was born in Geneva in 1920, the son of Jewish physicians Aron Starobinski of Warsaw and Sulka Frydman of Lublin.

Both his parents left Poland in 1913. Aron Starobinski chose to study humanities as well as medicine, and his son Jean, who received his Swiss citizenship only in 1948, would follow his example, eventually becoming a practicing psychiatrist. Yet even in Switzerland, the Starobinski family could not escape reminders of a legacy of Europe-wide oppression. In November 1932, when Starobinski was 11 years old, in his family’s Geneva neighborhood of Plainpalais, murderous violence broke out against the Swiss Jewish socialist Jacques Dicker, who was leading an anti-fascist demonstration. The Swiss army fired upon the protesters, killing 13 and wounding 65.

He studied classical literature, and then medicine at the University of Geneva, and graduated from that school with a doctorate in letters (Docteur ès lettres) and in medicine. He taught French literature at the Johns Hopkins University, the University of Basel and at the University of Geneva, where he also taught courses in the history of ideas and the history of medicine.

His existential and phenomenological literary criticism is sometimes grouped with the so-called "Geneva School". He wrote landmark works on French literature of the 18th century – including works on the writers Jean-Jacques Rousseau, Denis Diderot, Voltaire – and also on authors of other periods (such as Michel de Montaigne). He also wrote on contemporary poetry, art, and the problems of interpretation. His books have been translated into dozens of languages.

His knowledge of medicine and psychiatry brought him to study the history of melancholia (notably in the Trois Fureurs, 1974). He was the first scholar to publish work (in 1964) on Ferdinand de Saussure's study of anagrams.

Jean Starobinski was a member of the Académie des Sciences Morales et Politiques (a component of the Institut de France) and other French, European and American learned academies. He held honorary degrees (honoris causa) from numerous universities in Europe and America.

Starobinski died on 4 March 2019 in Morges, Switzerland, aged 98.

== Works ==
- Montesquieu, Paris, Seuil, 1953; reedited, 1994.
- Jean-Jacques Rousseau: la transparence et l’obstacle, Paris, Plon, 1957; Gallimard, 1971.
- Histoire du traitement de la mélancolie, des origines à 1900 Thèse, Bâle, Acta psychosomatica, 1960.
- L’Œil vivant, Paris, Gallimard, 1961.
- L’Invention de la Liberté, Geneva, Skira, 1964.
- Hamlet and Freud in Hamlet and Oedipus by Ernest Jones, introduction by Jean Starobinski, Tel Gallimard, Poche, ISBN 2-07-020651-3
- Portrait de l’artiste en saltimbanque, Geneva, Skira, 1970; Paris, Gallimard, 2004.
- La Relation critique, Paris, Gallimard, 1970; coll. «Tel», 2000.
- Les Mots sous les mots: les anagrammes de Ferdinand de Saussure, Paris, Gallimard, 1971.
- 1789: Les Emblèmes de la Raison, Paris, Flammarion, 1973.
- Trois Fureurs, Paris, Gallimard, 1974.
- "La conscience du corps" in Revue Française de Psychanalyse, 1981, n0 45/2,
- Montaigne en mouvement, Paris, Gallimard, 1982. (English edition: Montaigne in Motion, University of Chicago Press, 2009.
- Claude Garache, Paris, Flammarion, 1988.
- Table d’orientation, Lausanne, L’Âge d’homme, 1989.
- Le Remède dans le mal. Critique et légitimation de l’artifice à l’âge des Lumières, Paris, Gallimard, 1989.
- La mélancolie au miroir. Trois lectures de Baudelaire, Paris, Julliard, 1990.
- Diderot dans l’espace des peintres, Paris, Réunion des Musées Nationaux, 1991.
- Largesse, Paris, Réunion des Musées Nationaux, 1994.
- Action et réaction. Vie et aventures d’un couple, Paris, Seuil, 1999.
- La Poésie et la guerre, chroniques 1942-1944, Zoé, Geneva, 1999.
- La Caresse et le fouet, André Chénier, with engravings by Claude Garache, Editart, D. Blanco, Geneva, 1999.
- Le poème d'invitation, La Dogana, Geneva, 2001.
- Les enchanteresses, Seuil, Paris, 2005.
- Largesse, Paris, Gallimard, 2007.
- La parole est moitié à celuy qui parle... : entretiens avec Gérard Macé, Genève, La Dogana, 2009.
- « Questions sur un ramage », in L’Amuse-Bouche : La revue française de Yale. The French Language Journal at Yale University, 1(1), pp. 92-95, 2010.
- L'Encre de la mélancolie, Paris, Le Seuil, 2012
- Accuser et séduire, Paris, Gallimard, 2012
- Diderot, un diable de ramage, Paris, Gallimard, 2012
- La Beauté du monde – La littérature et les arts, Paris, Gallimard, 2016
- Le Corps et ses raisons., 2020, éd. Le Seuil, coll. Librairie du 20ème siècle, ISBN 2021238407.

== Sources ==
- Cramer, M, Starobinski, J and MA Barblan, 1978, Centenaire de la Faculte de Medecine de l’Universite de Geneve (1876-1976). Editions, Medecine et Hygiene, Geneve, Suisse.
