= Sonia Mossé =

French artist

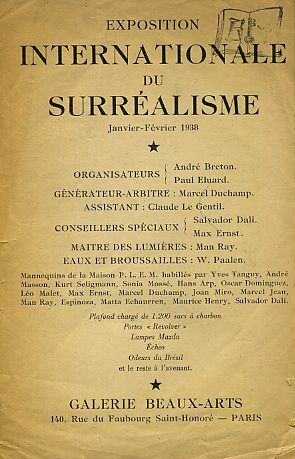
- Born: Sonia Mossé; 27 August 1917; Paris, France
- Died: 30 March 1943 (aged 25); Sobibor concentration camp, Poland
- Occupations: Artist, actress, decorator, draughtswoman
- Relatives: Esther Levine (half-sister)

Sonia Mossé (27 August 1917 – 30 March 1943) was a Jewish French artist, actor, decorator, and draughtswoman who inspired many artists of her time. Close to the surrealist movement, she frequented the Éluard couple, Man Ray and many other prominent artists of that time. Refusing to wear the yellow star, she was probably denounced in 1943 and died in the extermination camp of Sobibór. As an artist, she is known for having made and exhibited a surrealist mannequin for the Exposition Internationale du Surréalisme in 1938.

== Early years ==
Sonia Mossé was born in the 14e arrondissement of Paris. She is of Jewish origin and her parents are Emmanuel Mossé (1876–1963), lawyer at the Court of Appeal of Paris, and Natasza Goldfain (1890– ?). Her half-sister Esther Levine (1906–1943), eleven years her senior, was born of her mother's first marriage to Boris Levine, who died prematurely in 1915. Her half-brother Jean Joseph Mossé (1908–1995), nine years her senior, was born of her father's first marriage to Marguerite Icard. In April 1917, the couple ended their marriage, shortly before the birth of Sonia Mossé. The civil marriage of Emmanuel Mossé and Natasza Goldfain did not take place until March 1920, at the same time as the recognition of the parental legitimacy of their daughter. Nothing is known about the schooling and education of Sonia Mossé.

== Artistic career ==
In the years between the wars, theatres, painting and photography studios, fashion houses and cabarets offered unprecedented career opportunities for women. Sonia Mossé worked in several of these artistic fields. In March 1937, Jean-Louis Barrault staged Numance by Miguel de Cervantes at the Théâtre Antoine in Paris, in which she played the role of Renommée.

As a member of the Surrealist movement around André Breton and Paul Éluard, she was closely associated with Man Ray, Raoul Ubac and Antonin Artaud. Her blond, summery beauty inspired many photographers such as Man Ray, Juliette Lasserre and Wols, as well as painters such as Alberto Giacometti, Balthus and André Derain, for whom she posed.

Her friendship with Nusch Éluard is immortalised in a portrait by Man Ray in 1936.

In 1938, Sonia Mossé took part in the International Surrealist Exhibition in Paris. It took place from 17 January to 24 February at the Galerie Beaux-Arts of Georges Wildenstein, rue du Faubourg-Saint-Honoré. Sonia Mossé created a female mannequin whose head was covered with a black mourning veil that fell to her feet. On the mannequin's lips rests a dark-coloured false beetle and in her navel sits a small scorpion. The naked body is covered by a few water lilies and other beetles, and between her legs rises the calyx of a flower resembling a calla lily – 'the only model-artist has thus also created the only resolutely phallic interpretation of the sex of the doll in the strict sense.' In the exhibition space entitled Les plus belles rues de Paris, her mannequin is exhibited together with others, including those of Joan Miró, André Masson, Yves Tanguy, Hans Arp, Wolfgang Paalen, Marcel Duchamp and Salvador Dalí. There are photographs of this great exhibition taken by Denise Bellon, Raoul Ubac, Pierre Jahan, Gaston Paris, and Georg Reisner, as well as by Man Ray. Man Ray's pictures were published in 1966 in a limited edition under the title Résurrection des mannequins.

"In stark contrast, the surrealists did feature one mannequin designed by a female artist, Sonia Mossé. Mossé's mannequin, quasi-nude, appears to be wearing a funeral veil in place of a wedding veil for the consummation of a marriage, implying that the institution signifies literal bondage. Similar associations of the female mannequin and automatism ensue."

Lauren Walden, MDCCC 1800 – 6, edizioni-ca-foscari-journals

At the end of 1938, shortly before New Year's Eve, Sonia Mossé opened the cabaret Chez Agnès Capri with the singer and actress Agnès Capri and the project's instigator Michelle Lahaye. They were supported by Francis Picabia, Max Ernst, Alberto Giacometti, Jean Cocteau, Balthus, André Derain and Moise Kisling who provided paintings and drawings to finance the project. The interior of the cabaret was designed by Sonia Mossé. Suzy Solidor, Charles Trenet and Jacques Prévert visited the small stage and with their presence contributed to memorable evenings. When the Second World War broke out and Paris was occupied by German troops, the cabaret closed its doors and Sonia Mossé and Agnès Capri probably had to leave the French capital.

"At this terrace the people from Le Flore had moved in and I sat right behind Sonia and Agnes Capri; they were much less dashing than before; now they were thinking only of getting the hell out of Nice: 'I can't go through a night like that again', said Sonia; and they were feverishly counting money.'"

– Simone de Beauvoir, Letters to Sartre. 1930–1939

However, there is no further information that Sonia Mossé has in fact left Paris.

The wearing of the yellow star was enforced on 19 September 1941 by the police order on the marking of Jews in Paris. This led to the social exclusion, discrimination and humiliation of the Jewish population. The yellow star was thus also a publicly visible measure for the realisation of the Holocaust in Paris. Sonia Mossé did not wear the yellow star and continued to frequent cafés that were forbidden to Jewish citizens.

== Deportation and murder ==
It is not known whether Sonia Mossé was arrested by the French police or by the Gestapo in February 1943, but it is likely that a denunciation preceded her arrest. She was interned in the Drancy internment camp near Paris and deported on 25 March 1943 with her half-sister Esther Levine in convoy 53 to the extermination camp of Sobibór. Although the death certificates of Sonia Mossé and Esther Levine specify the Lublin-Majdanek concentration and extermination camp as the place of death, this appears to be a mistake. Based on the testimony of a survivor of convoy 53, it can be affirmed that the deportees were murdered on the very day of their arrival at Sobibor on 30 March 1943.

Apart from the photographs of her surrealist mannequin made in 1938, no other works of hers have been saved.

== Bibliography ==
- Dora Maar: Unidentified model (Sonia Mossé?), Photograph, ca. 1934.
- Wols: Sonia Mossé, Photograph, ca. 1935.
- Juliette Lasserre: Sonia Mossé, Photograph, ca. 1937.
- Man Ray: Nousch and Sonia, Drawing by Paul Éluard, Les Mains Libres, 1937.
- Man Ray: Sonia Mossé's Mannequin, Photograph, Exposition internationale du surréalisme à la galerie des Beaux Arts, Paris, 1938.
- Georg Reisner: Paul Éluard and the Mannequin of Sonia Mossé, Photograph, Exposition internationale du surréalisme à la galerie des Beaux Arts, Paris, 193828.
- Raoul Ubac, Mannequin de Sonia Mossé, Photograph, Exposition internationale du surréalisme à la galerie des Beaux Arts, Paris, 1938.
- Antonin Artaud, Spell to Sonia Mossé, Letter, 14 May 1939.
- Antonin Artaud: Sonia Mossé, Drawing, March 1946.

== Public tribute ==
In Paris' 7th arrondissement, a memorial plaque commemorates the life and deportation of Sonia Mossé. It was inaugurated on 20 September 2023 at her last residence at 104 Rue du Bac.
