= Nuage articulé =

Nuage articulé (Articulated cloud) is a surrealist object in the form of an assemblage by Wolfgang Paalen produced in 1937. The object consists of an umbrella covered with natural sponges and was one of the most significant objects at the Exposition Internationale du Surréalisme, which was held in Paris at the Wildenstein Gallery in 1938. It was also exhibited in numerous later exhibitions, such as Amsterdam (1938), Cambridge (1938) and Mexico City (1940). Many photographers have captured the item in its context, Man Ray, Kurt Husnik, Josef Breitenbach and Denise Bellon.

== Description ==
The object consists of a standard black umbrella with eight sections covered with flat-cut, dry natural sponges which are glued onto the fabric surfaces, the clamp and handle of the umbrella. The dimensions are 66 x 94 cm.

== History ==
The original definition of the surrealist object art comes from the French poet Comte de Lautréamont. In his poem Les Chants de Maldoror he describes the beauty of the young man Mervyn using antipodal metaphors: "He is as beautiful (..) as the chance encounter of a sewing machine and an umbrella on a dissecting table". In 1937 the French editor Gallimard prepared the publication of the collected works of Lautréamont in an illustrated luxury edition, and André Breton invited besides other artists also Paalen to contribute with an illustration Breton selected (from two proposals) the drawing Vieil océan (old Ocean), which was published in the Gallimard edition next to the appropriate text. The umbrella was always a strong metaphor in the imagery of surrealism: After a rainy day in the year 1930, he ran as congenial symbol of masculine-surrealist fury for many years – in front of a cinema André Breton had torn an umbrella from the hand of a smaller passer-by, because he had nearly hit the great Breton in his eyes. The poet broke the umbrella over his knee, which the friends Desnos, Prévert, Tanguy, Péret and Duhamel imitated, to do the same with other passers-by. The subsequent turmoil created the typical group euphoria which generated the emotional satisfaction that Breton was a matter of the heart.

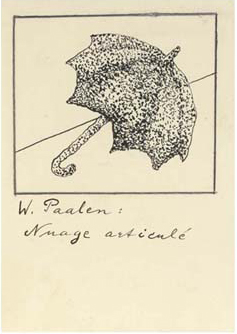
Drawing of the object Nuage articulé, created by Wolfgang Paalen in 1937

In the autumn of 1937, Breton began "during dinner-meetings with a limited number of participants after or before the usual meetings" to exchange opinions and suggestions on the proposed Exposition Internationale du Surréalisme, as well as to prepare the catalogue. Although Paalen was helped by his sister-in-law Geo Dupin at work, Nuage articulé was not ready prior to printing of the catalogue Dictionnaire abrégé du surréalisme; Breton, who particularly liked the object, published a project-drawing of Paalen. Whether Paalen brought the half-finished screen to a discrete private meeting in a smaller circle or just told the friends of it we do not know. Even the mere possibility, Paalen would eroticize the reality of the umbrella dialectically, will have certainly caused a stir, and as it was abundantly clear that a male-female union would be carried out here, all eyes were on reception. The umbrella as such embodied apart from its obvious phallic meaning, a masculine mean against the perils of nature and existence and was suddenly on everyone's lips. Paalen's proposal of a physical feminization was initially almost overlooked – the sponge cover feeds in moisture, has cleaned and touched naked woman's skin and still remained nature, and the opening of the sponge screen was suddenly the calyx as fertilizing stamen. The screen, however, was felt in the surrealist context primarily as a symbolic threat against bad weather. Marcel Duchamp's friend Henri-Pierre Roché reported that Duchamp was once asked by Breton, "to create a new ceiling for the large main room of the exhibition", and had the spontaneous idea, "to cover it with hundreds of open umbrellas with their tops down". It became only clear at the last moment, that it would be impossible to find that many umbrellas in the short term. Duchamp borrowed an open coal stove and a whole truckload of used coal-sacks from a coal merchant from La Villette, which he filled with newspaper and hung over the coal stove instead of the umbrellas.

== Reception ==
The erotic connotations of Nuage articulé, with its umbrella covered with natural sponges, embodied a dynamic sense of contradiction: bloom with stalk; sponge as symbol of nature, as a feminine utensil, which touched and cleaned naked female skin; umbrella as a masculine symbol of order and protection from natural forces. It thus became widely recognized among the Surrealists and their growing public. Geo Dupin, Paalen's sister-in-law, remembered that Alfred H. Barr, Jr. had been extremely taken with Paalen's object and had chosen not to buy it, for the Museum of Modern Art in New York, only because it was too fragile and difficult to transport. Nuage articulé was published later in a more political context in the Surrealist magazine London Bulletin, together with a text by André Breton translated by Samuel Beckett with acomment that the sponge-umbrella would bring to mind another, sadly prominent, umbrella-that of Neville Chamberlain at the 1938 Munich Conference and the failure of the British policy of appeasement.

== Versions and presentation ==
In 1938, the object was presented mostly hanging from the ceiling, 1940 Paalen opted for a museum-like presentation on a pedestal. Two versions have been preserved: The first one with eight segments, Nuage articulé (1937), was kept by Geo Dupin and sold in the 1970s to the Moderna Museet, Stockholm, bought by the Swedish art historian Pontus Hultén, where it is still visible today. The second one with 10 segments, Nuage articulé II (1939/40) was executed by Paalen after his arrival in Mexico in September 1939 for the International Surrealist Exhibition in Mexico City (opening January 1940), as due to the war objects from Paris could not be shipped. It was kept by Ines Amor, the owner of the Galeria de Arte Mexicano, who had organized the exhibition in 1940, was restored in 1956 by Paalen and is now as permanent loan in the Austrian Gallery in the Belvedere, Vienna. It was exhibited recently several times: 2011 in the Schirn Kunsthalle, Frankfurt (exhibition Surreale Dinge), 2012 in the Mjellby Konstmuseum, Halmstad (exhibition Surrealistiska ting), 2013 in the Centre Pompidou, Paris (exhibition Le surréalisme et l'objet) and 2018 in the Nationalgalerie Berlin, Hamburger Bahnhof – Museum für Gegenwart (Exhibition Hello World – Revision einer Sammlung). Since both original objects can no longer be loaned out for conservation reasons, the rights holders, the Wolfgang Paalen Gesellschaft e.V., in 2023 commissioned a replica of the first version from 1937 in an edition of three copies, which are available for loan to museums and exhibitions.
