= Mama, Papa is Wounded! =

1927 painting by Yves Tanguy

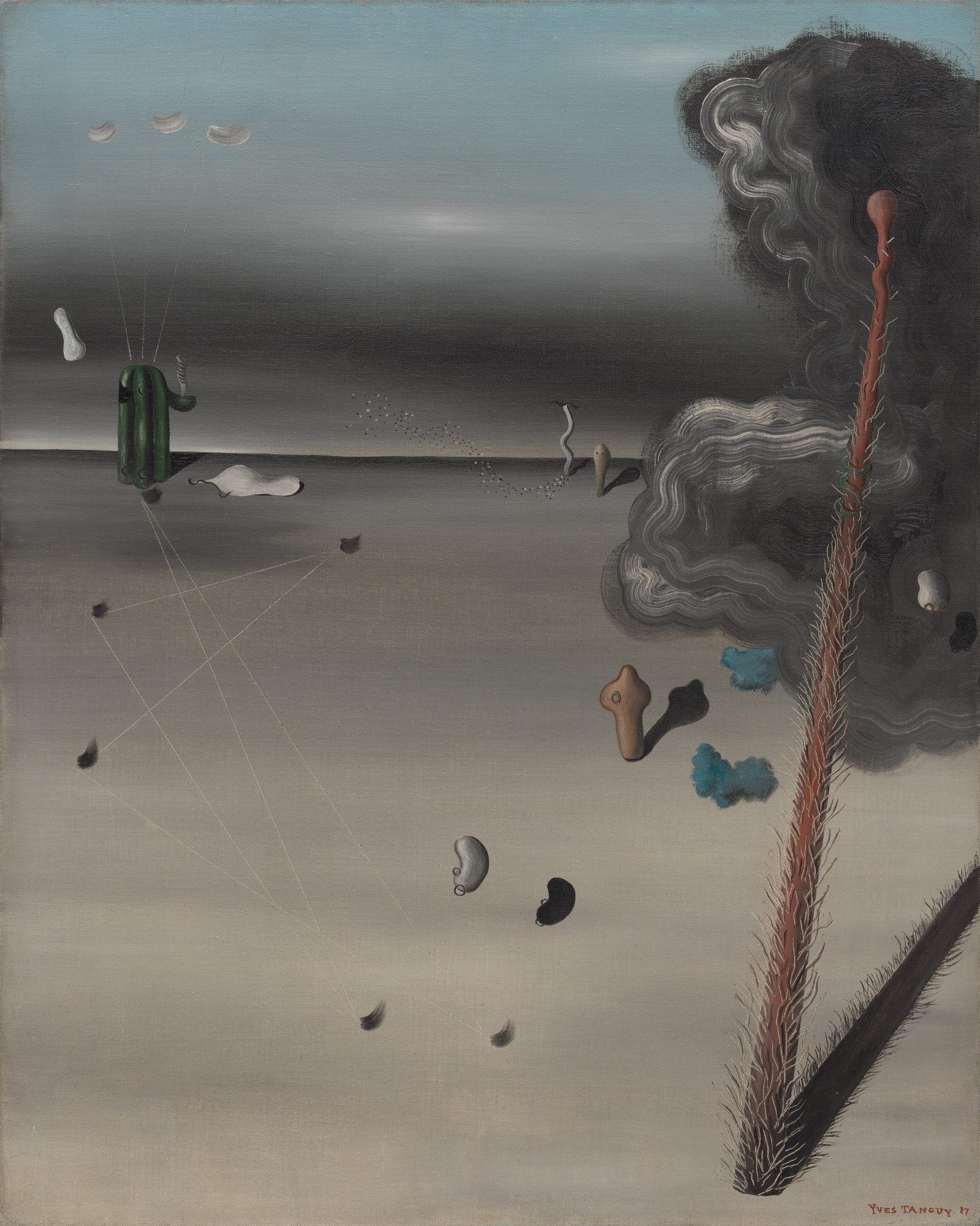
- Artist: Yves Tanguy
- Year: 1927
- Medium: Oil on canvas
- Movement: Surrealism
- Dimensions: 92.1 cm × 73 cm (36.3 in × 29 in)
- Location: Museum of Modern Art; New York
- Website: https://www.moma.org/collection/works/78701

Mama, Papa is Wounded! is a 1927 oil-on-canvas painting by French surrealist painter Yves Tanguy held at the Museum of Modern Art in New York City.

== Description ==
The title of the painting comes from a psychiatric case history, which Tanguy used to title other works as well.

From Sketchline:

"The picture is a fantastic landscape, illuminated by a grayish-violet unearthly light. Against the background of the desert space, there are several strange objects that are completely unconnected: a cactus, beans, a yellow figure and a peculiar “shaggy” stick. A dark cloud occupying the right side of the canvas hangs menacingly over the field. The title of the work not only does not explain what is happening but, as is often the case with Surrealists, creates an even greater mystery, thereby making the audience curious."

== Influence ==
According to Nathalia Brodskaïa, Mama, Papa is Wounded! is one of Tanguy's most impressive paintings. Brodskaïa writes that the painting reflects his debt to Giorgio de Chirico – falling shadows and a classical torso – and conjures up a sense of doom: the horizon, the emptiness of the plain, the solitary plant, the smoke, the helplessness of the small figures. Tanguy said that it was an image he saw entirely in his imagination before starting to paint it.
