= The Palace of the Windowed Rocks =

1942 painting by Yves Tanguy

- Artist: Yves Tanguy
- Year: 1942
- Medium: Oil on canvas
- Movement: Surrealism
- Dimensions: 163 cm × 132 cm (64 in × 52 in)
- Location: Musée National d'Art Moderne; Paris, France

The Palace of the Windowed Rocks (French: Le Palais aux rochers de fenetres) is a 1942 painting by French surrealist painter Yves Tanguy.

== Description ==
The title of the painting comes from the influence of the Atlas Mountains in Tanguy's work, which he referred to as "castles". The canvas has been described as depicting a desolate lunar landscape that shows, "a world that only looks as if it were real but appears as a coherence of facts put together with unshakable necessity...and it realizes a kind of world experiencing with correlative objects that seem to be real (comparable to a trompe-l'œil) although they can never be found in the real world (contrary to a trompe-l'œil)."

== Influence ==
Writer and gallery curator Mike Evans has called The Palace of the Windowed Rocks Tanguy's most famous painting. The painting was used by Penguin Books for the 1965 paperback cover of J. G. Ballard's post-apocalyptic novel The Drowned World.
