= Maria Eisner =

Italian-American photographer, photo editor and photo agent (1909–1991)

- Eisner photographed in New York by Henri Cartier-Bresson, 1952
- Born: Marie-Jeanne Eisner; February 8, 1909; Milan, Kingdom of Italy
- Died: March 8, 1991 (aged 82); New York City, U.S.
- Occupations: Photographer, picture editor, photo agent

Maria Eisner (/ˈaɪznər/; born Marie-Jeanne Eisner; also Maria Eisner Lehfeldt; February 8, 1909 – March 8, 1991) was an Italian-American photographer, photo editor and photo agent. She was one of the founders of Magnum Photos, and the first head of its Paris office.

== Origin ==
Maria Eisner (born Marie-Jeanne Eisner) was the daughter of Emma (née Lederer) and Alfred Eisner, a merchant. Her Jewish parents had emigrated to the USA in 1886, were naturalised 1891, lived in Nebraska, then briefly in 1896 in Milan, where Maria was born in 1909.

== Early career ==
Eisner studied in Germany and worked for the illustrated press from the age of twenty, was trained by Simon Guttmann, head of the very successful Berlin-based agency Dephot (Deutsche Photo Dienst), and her imagery attracted clients including Berlin publisher Martin Hürlimann.

== France and Alliance Photo agency ==
From the 1920s, photographers from Germany, but also Hungary, took refuge in Paris, at the same time as the appearance of photographic magazines with a large circulation. The German group Ullstein, in particular, employed photojournalists who, fleeing from Nazism, brought their experience in this field to France. Charles Rado, founder of Rapho (1932), and Eisner of Alliance Photo agency, both came from Ullstein, as did Stefan Lorant, based in England, among others.

Eisner fled Nazi Germany in 1932 to France where before the War she contributed photography to such journals as Paris Sex-Appeal In 1933 Eisner was Simon Guttmann's representative in Paris, which she continued after the inception, with Fritz Goro, of the agency Anglo-Continental Press-Photo Service in mid 1934, which lasted only a few months, then decided to put her experience in the illustrated press at the service of photographers.

=== Foundation and membership ===
Alliance Photo started initially at Eisner's apartment in 26 rue de la Pépinière and brought together Eisner's friends from Studio Zuber operated by René Zuber who worked for Étienne Damour's advertising agency from 1929 to 1932, contributing to the magazine Vendre, then had opened his own photographic studio, rue Vernier with Robert Capa, Pierre Boucher, David Seymour, Emeric Feher, René Zuber and Denise Bellon who were all recruited for Eisner's new agency. Suzanne Laroche and Juliette Lasserre soon joined them.

"Chim" Seymour mentions "a German girl", who is Eisner, in one of his letters home;

'Socially, I am moving in new circles, away from the Polish gang. I am more among photographers, thinking people, interested in the same problems as myself. However, I feel a stranger and I am missing the "togetherness" ' of our Polish bunch. I met a German girl, who became quite prominent in the French press and she feels as I do. We are trying to organise some kind of association of revolutionary-minded photographers ..."

From October 1935, Gerda Taro sold pictures for Alliance Photo, then started working for the agency as a photographer, and introduced the fictitious American Capa (Endre Friedmann's pseudonym) to Alliance in the hope of higher royalties, but Eisner recognised his imagery and offered him a lower monthly advance of 1,100 francs in return for covering three assignments a week, of which 500 francs were used for expenses. With the 1,200 francs a month Eisner was paying Gerda, the couple had at last a modest income, although they had to work hard; early in April André wrote to his mother: "In the past four weeks I haven't slept more than five hours a night. We get up early and run around all day, and at night we manufacture an article."

The collective was officially registered in 13 December 1935, and eventually settled at 125 rue du Faubourg St Honoré.

Eisner's particularity was to propose subjects to the editors without waiting for their request and she also promoted her photographers as authors, demanding that their shots be credited in a by-line. To meet the quotidian interests of the press, it used photographers who recorded current events; Capa, Seymour, Cartier-Bresson and a few others including the Japanese Yōnosuke Natori. It was Alliance Photo which in 1936 contributed to Vu Capa's famous photograph of a fighter in the Spanish Civil War apparently felled by a bullet.

=== Clients ===
As well as the magazine Vu, Alliance Photo clients included Art et Médecine, Arts et Métiers graphiques, Fiat Revue, Le Monde illustré, Paris-Magazine, Pour lire à deux, Visages du monde, and Voilà. Images from Alliance Photo were also distributed internationally and published in the United States, Great Britain, Switzerland, Belgium and the Netherlands due to Eisner sales prowess, her fluency in four languages, and her contacts abroad with agencies such as Black Star in New York or ABC-Press in Amsterdam.

=== Innovation and reputation ===
In earlier agencies, photographers would lose the rights to pictures sold to magazines or newspapers, and often had to hand over the negatives as well. At Alliance Photo, Eisner established an indexing system for the long-term conservation of, and credit for, its photographers' pictures. Consequently the agency's photographers enjoyed a growing reputation both inside and outside France with Verger, Boucher, Feher and Zuber participating in an exposition Affiche Photo Typo, organised by the Maison de la Culture, and Bellon, Boucher, Feher and Verger being invited by Beaumont Newhall to participate in Photography 1837-1938 at the Museum of Modern Art (MoMA). Through Eisner's diligence, collaboration with the Musée de l’Homme (1937–1938) and photographers from Alliance Photo, particularly Verger and Zuber, took on a formal dimension through the design of the new rooms at the museum in which modern photographs showed the objects of anthropological interest in context and in use.

== Flight to United States ==
Alliance Photo ceased its activities at the end of the autumn of 1939, as Eisner, a Jew, had to flee Paris at the time of the occupation. Considered a German ally, she was interned in June 1940 in the Gurs camp in the Pyrenees. Liberated in August, she transited via Portugal to emigrate to the United States. where she spent the end of the Second World War. The agency she founded was re-established after the war as A.D.E.P. (Agence de documentation et d’édition photographiques) run by Suzanne and Pierre Boucher, closing in 1959.

== Magnum Photos ==
=== Founder ===
Eisner was one of the founders of Magnum Photos; the only one with any previous experience in such a venture. She was crucial to its success, bringing essential skills in organising and marketing the work of multiple photographers, and responsible for establishing the archives and working methods in the offices, including the use of contact sheets.

In May 1947, Robert Capa organised a meeting over lunch at the Museum of Modern Art in New York with Eisner and LIFE magazine's Bill Vandivert and his wife, Rita, to establish Magnum Photos, Inc. Though Henri Cartier-Bresson, David "Chim" Seymour, and George Rodger were not told of the meeting, they were nevertheless made Magnum's vice-presidents. On a detour to Paris, Seymour received Eisner's telegram: "You are Vice President of Magnum Photos. Detailed letter sent to Paris on May 22nd. I will soon have interesting assignments for you."

The seven members became the original shareholders of Magnum which was to have offices in New York and Paris, to be run respectively by their new president, Rita Vandivert for which she was paid $8,000 a year, and Eisner was appointed secretary and treasurer and head of the Paris ‘office’, on $4,000 a year, at 125 rue du Faubourg St Honore, from where she had run Alliance before the war. In New York it operated from the Vandiverts’ small office and darkroom in a brownstone on Eighth Street in Greenwich Village. Bill and Rita Vandivert left Magnum in 1948.

=== President ===
After their departure Eisner, having had great success of the Paris office, was asked to take over as president, and being engaged to Hans Lehfeldt a doctor living in the United States, she immediately accepted and Magnum Photos' Paris office retained her large, fourth-floor apartment at 125 Rue du Faubourg St.-Honoré, convenient to Capa's rooms at the Hotel Lancaster, so that he could use the office to make phone calls and dictate copy for his photo-stories. In New York, the office building was moved to West 4th Street, between Fifth and Sixth Avenues, smaller, but close to the Algonquin, where later, Capa liked to lunch. When in 1950 a merger was proposed with the New York agency Scope, Eisner balked and the idea was shelved. Erich Hartmann recalled his first encounter with Eisner at the Magnum office:

Smiling at me was this nice lady who turned out to be Maria Eisner and who spoke to me in this lovely Berlin accent, so I knew I was speaking to a fellow German and fellow refugee and we began chatting. I told her I was a photographer and was interested in Magnum and then I met Capa who said to Maria 'Well he doesn't know much, but I think we can do something with him.' I was allowed to hang around the office to see the way photographers worked and what they thought of the world and I realised that what they were doing was not just descriptive pictures of wherever they were. They were making a comment on what it was they were looking at. They were saying: I've been here and I've looked at that and that's what I think about it.

Eisner became the second wife of gynaecologist Hans Max Julius Lehfeldt, M.D. in 1949 and moved to New York in 1949 as the agency's president. Whelan records her unease with Capa's anarchic management style, at odds with her own organisation, and his ready borrowing of money from the agency, particularly that of Cartier-Bresson then operating independently in the East.

=== Departure ===
Eisner recruited the Swiss Werner Bischof and the American Ernst Haas for Magnum. She became pregnant with her son Richard in 1951. Capa regarded her impending motherhood as a distraction from her work and delegated George Rodger, briefly returned from Africa, to tell her she was to be dismissed and to arrange her severance pay. Capa took over as president in July that year, but soon found office work tedious and handed the management to Rodger.

Of Eisner's subsequent life, little is recorded though it is clear that she and her husband shared an interest in art and photography; Wheeler notes that "the modest Lehfeldt home...was filled with art and culture and rare books and original paintings and photographs. The collection included original works by Richard Lindner, Emil Nolde, Chagall, Picasso, Braque, and Matisse. An extraordinary group of photographs, several by Cartier-Bresson, included one of... Maria."

Eisner died on 8 March 1991 at her home in Manhattan aged 82 years, survived by her husband and son.

== See also ==
- David Seymour (Chim)
- George Rodger
