= Emeric Feher =

Emeric Feher was a photographer born in Bečej (Austria-Hungary) in 1904 and died in 1966 in Paris.

He became Yugoslav in 1919 and obtained French nationality in 1939.

His photographic production is characterized by the frequent use of square format (6x6). From 1933 to 1939, he worked for the Parisian Alliance Photo agency founded by Maria Eisner.
