= Leonard Yaseen =

American pioneering in site selection

- Born: June 27, 1912; Chicago Heights, Illinois, United States
- Died: October 8, 1989 (aged 77); Rhode Island Hospital
- Education: University of Illinois
- Occupations: Entrepreneur, consultant
- Known for: Pioneer in the practice of site selection
- Spouse: Helen Fantus

Leonard Yaseen (1912–1989) was an American entrepreneur noted for pioneering the consulting practice of site selection. His company, Fantus Corporation, was noted for providing services to clients requiring strategic locations for the construction of their factories and facilities. Under his direction, the company became the largest business consulting firm during its time. It is also considered one of the most powerful yet obscure consulting firms in American history.

== Early life and education ==
Yaseen was born on June 27, 1912, in Chicago Heights, Illinois. There is little information about his early life except for his education before his career. After obtaining his degree from the University of Illinois, he started working for the Fantus Corporation, a real estate company owned by Felix Fantus. Yaseen was married to his daughter, Helen.

== Career ==
Yaseen later became a partner of Fantus Corporation. However, while working for Fantus as his boss, he became increasingly dissatisfied. An account described his father-in-law's focus on doing a lot more for corporate clients by providing them with more information beyond what was needed for buying or selling properties. In Yaseen's mind, the data should be given to clients for a fee. The proposition that the added services can be commodified was rejected by his father-in-law.

In 1934, he left Fantus’ Chicago office and relocated to New York. There, he was able to secure employment from a Manhattan company and subsequently founded the Fantus Factory Locating Service. The company was fledgling until it first found success consulting for public and private organizations seeking to build factories during World War II. During this period, the U.S. government encouraged the dispersal of military manufacturing plants, amplifying this need for private facilities as well. The company enjoyed increased clientele, who were then seeking better locations that were safe for their factories from threats of bomb attack. His consulting service prospered to the point that Yaseen was able to buy a controlling stake of Fantus Corporation. He also converted it into a site location consulting firm and appointed his brother-in-law, Maurice Fulton, as the head of the Chicago office.

From the latter part of the 1930s to the next four decades, Yaseen saw his company dominate the site location consulting industry in the United States. According to the company, it had engineered the relocation of 4,000 facilities by the time Yaseen retired in 1977. Yaseen and Fantus’ influence was demonstrated in how the company became a major opinion-maker in the market. For instance, Yaseen dismissed New York City as a place to do business and advocated for the relocation of factories to the suburbs or rural areas. This led to one of the criticisms about Yaseen's business practice - that his company had cost New York City jobs due to the exodus of businesses from the city.

== Philanthropy ==
Together with his wife, Yaseen is credited with founding the Yaseen Studies in Modern Art at the Metropolitan Museum. He was also a trustee of the Hirshhorn Museum. Yaseen had lived in Larchmont, New York. He died of a heart attack at the Rhode Island Hospital on October 8, 1989.
