= Fantus Corporation =

American consulting firm

- Trade name: Fantus Company
- Type: Privately held company
- Industry: Consulting
- Founded: 1919 in Chicago
- Founder: Felix Fantus
- Defunct: 1983
- Fate: Acquired
- Successor: Deloitte & Touche
- Headquarters: New York City, United States
- Products: Industrial location consultancy

The Fantus Corporation, (also Fantus Company or Fantus Co.) was an American consulting company. At its peak, it became the largest business consulting firm in the United States. It is also considered one of the most powerful yet obscure consulting firms in American history.

== History ==
=== Early years ===
Felix Fantus established Fantus Company in 1919 in Chicago. The businessman was previously engaged in the manufacture of chairs and was looking for a new site to relocate his Indiana plant. He found the process too complicated, so he decided to establish an industrial realty that addressed this problem by selling industrial real estate to clients.

Fantus Company was known for providing information on possible plant locations to its real estate clients. The information included all the background factors for all the industrial sites being sold. Leonard Yaseen, an employee who was also married to Fantus’ daughter Helen, believed that this valuable data should not be given for free. In an interview with The New York Times, he stated, “I felt that my father-in-law's firm was rendering a considerable amount of free service to its clients. I approached my father-in-law to put the service end of the business on a professional basis. He was satisfied the way it was going.”

Impatient with the outcome, Yaseen left the company and relocated to New York where he established the consulting firm, Fantus Factory Locating Service. The company commodified the business insights provided to companies looking for new sites. The business struggled for a time until World War II broke out. During this period, companies began searching for manufacturing sites outside of the cities where the risk of bombing was high. By the end of the war, Yaseen's company had significantly prospered with so many clients that Yaseen was able to buy a controlling stake in Fantus.

Under Yaseen's management, Fantus stopped its real estate business and focused on plant-location consulting based on data-driven, cost-based studies. The company's headquarters was also relocated to New York.

=== Diversification ===
In 1953, Fantus diversified with the establishment of Fantus Area Research, Inc. The addition of this subsidiary was intended to attract new clients seeking new industry and looking at industrial development information involving states, regions, cities, utilities, and railroads.

By 1962, the company was reported to have conducted 250 plant site studies in the United States and Europe, which led to the construction of 70 manufacturing plants that cost $100 million. Fantus stated that it had engineered the relocation of 4,000 facilities by the time Yaseen retired in 1977. Fantus’ influence was demonstrated in how the company became a major opinion-maker in the market. For instance, an analysis released by the company dismissed New York City as a place to do business and advocated for the relocation of factories to the suburbs or rural areas. As a result, it caused corporate flight, leading to the loss of jobs. It is claimed that Fantus shaped the American economic geography as well as the American belief about what constitutes a good business climate.

Fantus did extensive overseas consulting and was responsible for projects of American companies expanding into at least a dozen other countries.

=== Acquisition ===
Fantus was sold to Dun & Bradstreet in the late 1960s and operated to enhance the latter's business research capabilities during a period characterized by post-war industrial expansion. Yaseen continued as its chairman until his retirement and succeeded by his brother-in-law, Maurice Fulton. In 1983, Fantus was acquired by PHH Group, which then sold the company to Deloitte & Touche in 1996.
