= Hélène Vanel =

Hélène Vanel was a dancer, sculptor, and painter affiliated with the Surrealist movement of the 20th century. Not a great deal is known now of Vanel, though she was quite famous during her time.

== Early life ==
Vanel first arrived on the scene in 1921 when she joined the Margaret Morris Club, a school of dance in London. In 1923, Vanel, Morris, and Loïs Hutton began holding summer dance school in the town of Antibes in the French Riviera. Picasso and the Murphys (a wealthy American couple that were the subjects in F. Scott Fitzgerald's Tender is the Night) attended the groups Riviera performances.

In 1924, after a disagreement with Morris, Vanel and Hutton split off from the Margaret Morris Club and formed their own dance school and company in France. Vanel said that she "wanted to see dance freed from its conventions, giving greater importance to the dancer itself as an artistic material, seeing in the dancer lines, shapes and movements and a material, worked like stone or clay, but into which humanity has been kneaded". Vanel and Hutton were lovers, and their breakup in 1934 and subsequent business split made the news. Her fame already established, she was billed to perform at the Exposition Internationale du Surréalisme, her act being one of the draws for the "right crowd" to come to the show.

== Performance at the Exposition Internationale du Surréalisme ==
Vanel's performance at the Exposition explored conventional and Surrealist ideas of hysteria through dance, as well as an existing as a physical form of automatism. Hysteria at the time referred to a gendered condition thought to be caused by a wandering uterus. This condition precipitated into many symptoms of malaise, all thought to be directly correlated to the mental inferiority of women, though today in 2019 it is understood to be a product of PTSD from sexual assault and verbal abuse within a society with no framework for discussing such things. Breton and Aragon served as an orderlies in WW1, and observed how the PTSD of soldiers (termed war hysteria) was not a result of weakness. Hysteria was viewed by many Surrealist artists as a subversion of the status quo. The performance drew great critique from attendees and Vanel's fellow surrealists.

Dali said of her performance

"She jetted from the wings like a tornado in an

unbelievable movement that induced a demential delirium

within all in attendance. She created a total uproar

with her violent entrance, lunging up onto the bed,

holding at arm's length a live rooster which cackled

in terror. She herself began screaming in hysterical

mimodrama as she rolled and contorted herself on

the bed. She jumped up and down before throwing

herself into the pond surrounded by reeds that we

had set up in the middle of the room. (Dali 1973, 233)"

Unfortunately, her historic part in the first Surrealist exposition did not garner the attention of many scholars.

=== Post Exposition ===
Vanel went on to continue her dance school and company after the exposition. A rare quote of hers reads

"Dance, joyous and powerful expression of the enthusiasm for life, must have the same mission as poetry. It creates forms in time and space. Dance is the vertigo of matter...To recover the truth of being. To simultaneously acquire the sense of the invisible powers which attract us even while repelling us: Is this not a means of overcoming ourselves, of leaving behind marasmus and mediocrity, a method for attaining that magnificence that we have so shamefully abandoned."

She went on to become a painter, sculptor, and a lecturer at the Louvre.
