= Exposition Internationale du Surréalisme =

1938 Paris exhibition by surrealist artists

Coordinates: 48°52′22″N 2°18′40″E

The Exposition Internationale du Surréalisme was an exhibition by surrealist artists that took place from January 17 to February 24, 1938, in the generously equipped Galérie Beaux-Arts, run by Georges Wildenstein, at 140, Rue du Faubourg Saint-Honoré in Paris. It was organised by the French writer André Breton, the surrealists' brain and theorist, and Paul Éluard, the best known poet of the movement. The catalogue listed, along with the above, Marcel Duchamp as generator and arbitrator (to appease the partly fierce conflicts mainly between Breton and Éluard), Salvador Dalí and Max Ernst as technical advisers, Man Ray as head lighting technician and Wolfgang Paalen as responsible for the design of the entrance and main hall with "water and foliage". The exhibition was staged in three sections, showing paintings and objects as well as unusually decorated rooms and mannequins which had been redesigned in various ways. With this holistic presentation of surrealist art work the movement wrote exhibition history.

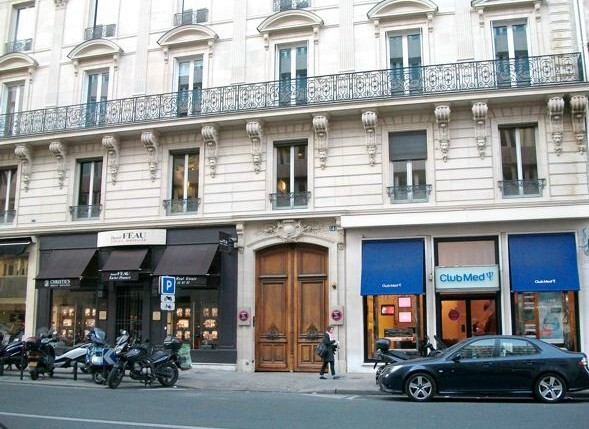
Built in 1860, the house at 140, Rue du Faubourg Saint-Honoré in Paris, in which exhibition was held. Photo taken in 2011

Before their first group exhibition in November 1925, which took place in Pierre Loeb's gallery "Pierre" in Paris, the surrealist artists had previously shown their works at solo exhibitions. The group exhibition showed works of Giorgio de Chirico, Hans Arp, Max Ernst, Paul Klee, Man Ray, André Masson, Joan Miró, Pablo Picasso and Pierre Roy. Another joint exhibition followed in 1928 in the Parisian gallery "Au Sacre du Printemps" with the title "Le Surréalisme, existe-t-il?" (Does Surrealism really exist?) Among the participants were Max Ernst, André Masson, Joan Miró, Francis Picabia und Yves Tanguy. Further group exhibitions followed. In 1931 the first surrealist exhibition in the US took place in the Wadsworth Atheneum in Hartford, Connecticut, and in May 1936 the "Exposition surréaliste d'objets" was held in the Parisian gallery Charles Ratton, which particularly valued object art and also referred to Primitivism, sexual fetishes and mathematical models.

In June of the same year the International Surrealist Exhibition was launched in the New Burlington Galleries in London. In 1937, the title Exposition internationale du surréalisme was also used for a touring exhibition in Japan, Kaigai Chōgenjitsushugi Sakuhinten. These exhibitions still made use of the usual form of representation, i.e. the White Room, which was designed at the "Sonderbund" exhibition in Cologne in 1912. In 1938 however, André Breton wanted to establish a framework for the surrealist art in the Beaux Arts Gallery, in which the presentation itself was surrealist art. As a creative act it was to be a surreal experience, in which paintings and objects served as elements in a completely surrealist environment.

At the end of 1937, André Breton and Nusch Éluard asked Duchamp to contribute ideas to the surrealist exhibition they were planning. Duchamp had already presented his works at previous exhibitions, but he never became a member because of his principle never to be part of any group. Nevertheless, Duchamp accepted the invitation to help design the exhibition. This led to cooperation on further projects, such as the First Papers of Surrealism exhibition, which took place in New York City in 1942. Various discreet meetings were held together with the inner circle of responsible curators and designers (Marcel Duchamp, Wolfgang Paalen, Man Ray, Max Ernst, Salvador Dalí) to discuss the general outlines and specific thematical questions.

== The catalogue and a reference book ==
The eight-page catalogue, in which all the artists were listed in huge capital letters and so impossible to overlook, provided information about the people involved in the exhibition. André Breton and Paul Éluard acted as organisers, Marcel Duchamp was named as "Generateur-arbitre", Salvador Dalí and Max Ernst were listed as technical directors, Man Ray was chief lighting technician and Wolfgang Paalen responsible for "water and foliage".

Accompanying the exhibition, the gallery of Beaux-Arts published in addition to the catalogue a 76-page Dictionnaire abrégé du surréalisme under the direction of Breton and Éluard. It was a dictionary of Surrealism with an introduction by the French art critic and artistic director of the gallery, Raymond Congniat, along with cover artwork by Yves Tanguy and an illustrated section which was quite extensive for the time and which summed up the proof of origin of the complete surrealistic artwork. Here, all artists' names, "all keywords, all obsessional concepts and motives, the new inspirational image techniques and the ancestors" were unified. The names and terms from "Absurde" to "Zen" and "Zibou", organized in alphabetical order, were mostly explained by quotations from publications written by representative members of the surrealist movement.

== The exhibition ==
The exhibition was divided into three parts: a "lobby" with the taxi pluvieux (rain cab) by Salvador Dalí and two main sections; the first the Plus belles rues de Paris ("The most beautiful streets of Paris") with surrealistically fitted mannequins rented from a French manufacturer, and a central room arranged by Marcel Duchamp and Wolfgang Paalen with lighting by Man Ray. Paintings, collages, photographs and graphics hung - poorly lit - on the walls and on Duchamp's two revolving doors. Wolfgang Paalen created an artificial pond with real waterlillies and reed, covered the whole floor of the exhibition (including the entrance pathway with wet leaves and mud from the Monparnasse cemetery, and installed his objects "Chaise envahie de lierre" and Nuage articulé. Further objects were placed on different kinds of pedestals. Using objects and items from nature and civilization, the room itself was "transformed into a gloomy-absurd ambience: less exhibition room than cave and womb."

=== The opening ===
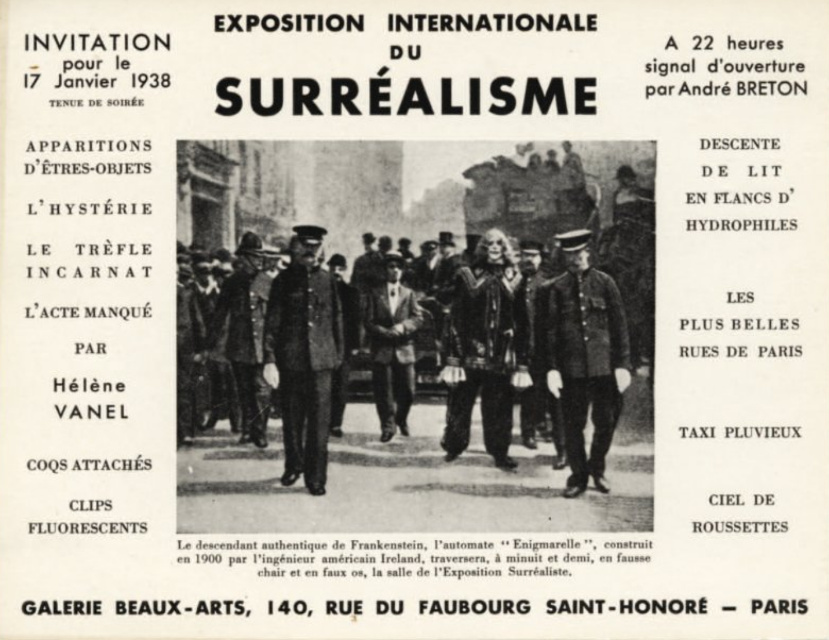
Invitation card depicting Enigmarelle

The exhibition was opened late on the first night, at 10 pm. Evening dress was required and all manner of highlights had been promised: hysteria, a sky full of flying dogs and the presence of Enigmarelle, an humanoid automaton, a descendant of Frankenstein. Marcel Duchamp could not attend the exhibition, because he and his partner Mary Reynolds had gone to London in order to select and hang paintings and drawings by Jean Cocteau for Peggy Guggenheim's Gallery Guggenheim Jeune. The gallery was opened on January 24, 1938, with a Jean Cocteau exhibition. Also not present were Joan Miró and Yves Tanguy, who did not usually attend collaborative events, as well as René Magritte, who lived in Brussels. At Ernst, Dalí and Paalen had trained the actress Hélène Vanel to do a performance. She jumped out of pillows lying on the floor with chains wrapped around her naked body. After splashing wildly in Wolfgang Paalen´s puddle she reappeared dressed in a tattered evening dress a short time later "and gave a very realistic performance of a hysterical attack" in one of the beds in the main hall.

=== The artists ===
The event showed 229 works by 60 exhibitors from 14 countries and contained paintings, art objects, collages, photographs and installations. Artists and writers like Hans Bellmer, Leonora Carrington, Joseph Cornell and Óscar Domínguez participated. Salvador Dalí was represented with six paintings, among which was "The Great Masturbator" from 1929. Wolfgang Paalen showed his painting "Paysage totémique de mon enfance" among others, as well as his objects "Le moi et le soi", "Potènce avec paratonnerre" (a life-sized gibbet with a lightning rod dedicated to the German philosopher Georg Christoph Lichtenberg. Paalen's umbrella made with sponges Nuage articulé was hanging from the ceiling. The "Ultra-furniture", 1937, by Kurt Seligmann, sculptures by Alberto Giacometti, and objects by Meret Oppenheim, including "Breakfast in Fur" from 1936, were presented along with five other works, such as "La Baguerre d'Austerlitz" and a replica of the Ready-mades "Bottle Dryer" by Marcel Duchamp. Furthermore, there were 14 pictures by Max Ernst, such as "The Rendezvous of Friends" from 1922 and "The Triumph of Surrealism" from 1937; works by Stanley William Hayter, Georges Hugnet, Humphrey Jennings, and Léo Malet; "The Expectation", 1936, by Richard Oelze; and two surrealistic pictures by Pablo Picasso. Man Ray presented, among other works, "A l'heure de l'observatoire – les amoureux", 1932–34, as well as "Irrlichter" from 1932 to 1937. There were nine works by René Magritte, for example "The Key to the Fields" from 1936 and "The Therapist II" from 1937; eight early pictures by Giorgio de Chirico; works by André Masson and Roberto Matta; and several works by Joan Miró, including "Dutch Interior I" from 1928. Other artists represented included Roland Penrose; Jindřich Štyrský; Yves Tanguy with nine pictures, among which was "From the Other Side of the Bridge" from 1936; Toyen; Raoul Ubac; and Remedios Varo. And the Danish painter Rita Kernn-Larsen with her self-portrait " Know Thyself."

=== The Forecourt ===
Dalí's Rain Taxi, a former taxi, welcomed the visitors in the forecourt. The old automobile was covered with ivy inside and out, and a female dummy with dishevelled hair and dressed in an evening gown sat between some heads of lettuce and chicory in the back of the car. Next to her was a sewing machine. The driver was a doll, whose head was framed by the mouth of a shark and whose eyes were covered by a pair of dark glasses. The interior was constantly sprayed with water so that the clothes of the lady were drenched and the blond wig dissolved into felted strands, while some edible snails, visible on the lady's neck, left their slimy traces.

In 1974, Dalí exhibited his Rain Taxi in his birthplace of Figueres in Catalonia, in the inner courtyard of the museum for the opening of the Theatre-Museu Dalí. The roof of the taxi was decorated with the large sculpture Esther by Ernst Fuchs.

=== The most beautiful streets in Paris ===
From the forecourt the visitors passed into a long corridor with street signs. In the Plus belles rue de Paris artists such as Marcel Duchamp, Max Ernst, Joan Miró, Man Ray, André Masson, Yves Tanguy and Wolfgang Paalen exhibited dummies, provocatively designed and dressed as sex objects and standing in front of the street signs. The sixteen figures showed surrealist motives and techniques, which consisted of concealment and revelation, and expressed captivated lust, the power of unconscious desire and the breaking of taboos.

The street signs partly referred to surrealistic obsessions and sometimes had a fictionally poetic character, but also actual street names, such as Rue Nicolas-Flamel in Paris, were also used. This name was a dedication to the medieval alchemist Nicolas Flamel, whose works were cited by André Breton, Paul Éluard and Robert Desnos as examples of surrealistic poetry. The Surrealists owe their mission statement of the sewing machine and the umbrella on the dissection table to the writer Lautréamont, who lived in the Rue Vivienne. [18] According to Max Ernst, two or more "alien elements provoke the highest poetical lightning" when they meet on a grid which is foreign to them.[19] The Panorama Passage referred to one of the Surrealists' favorite places in Paris, the Rue de la Vielle Lanterne, in memory of the street, which no longer exists. In this street Gérard de Nerval, who, according to Breton, was the role model for the movement, committed suicide. The Porte de Lilas referred to La Closerie de Lilas - the meeting place of the intellectuals. Other street names were mystifying inventions, like the Rue de la Transfusion (Blood Transfusion Street) and the Rue de Tous les Diables (Devil's Street).[20]

Masson's mannequin attracted great attention because he had squeezed its head into a bird cage covered with red fish made of celluloid. It was gagged with a ribbon made of velvet, with a pansy placed at its mouth. Underneath, red paprika caught in traps grew out of a ground of coarse salt grains. The paprika pointed upwards to the mannequin's genitalia, like many tiny erections. Marcel Duchamp dressed his mannequin in a man's felt hat, shirt, tie and jacket; a red bulb blinked in the breast pocket, and the lower part of the mannequin was naked - "Rose Selavy (Duchamp's alter ego) in one of her provocative and androgynous moods". Yves Tanguy draped it with phallus-like spindles, Man Ray arranged his figure with big tears and decorated its head with pitch pipes and glass balloons. Wolfgang Paalen used mushrooms and moss to give his mannequin an overgrown look, and added a giant vampire-like bat; Óscar Domínguez placed an enormous siphon at the side of his mannequin. Out of the siphon an abundant jet of drapery was fired out. At the feet of his "Black Widow", Max Ernst set a man with a lion head, lying on the floor and sprinkled with paint. He intended to place a glowing bulb in her underwear, exposed by her pulled-up skirt, but Breton prevented this. Only at second glance were the visitors able to realise that they were looking at "artificial" women.

=== The Main Room ===
The most beautiful streets of Paris led to the main room. It was designed by Duchamp and Paalen in the form of a grotto or womb, with 1200 coal bags hanging from the ceiling, filled with newspapers instead of coal. Despite this, evil-smelling coal dust trickled down. They resembled modern stalactites, which inverted the categories of up and down. Paalen's installation "Avant La Mare" with pond, water lilies and reed, as well as his floor decoration with dead leaves and mud turned the whole atmosphere into a sphere of humidity, fog and romantic twilight, especially since Man Ray's lighting through soffits did not work out on the evening of the vernissage visitors were forced to use the flashlights that were handed out in order to orient themselves in the darkness. Frequently visitors forgot to bring them back. Man Ray later remarked: "Unnecessary to mention that the flashlights were pointed at the faces of the people rather than at the artworks themselves. As at every overcrowded vernissage, everyone wanted to know who else was around." Some of the historians see the design of the main hall as a metaphor for the menaced situation of surrealism, mirrored in the harassment of the political situation before the war, as well as an outsized uterus as vade mecum against the deeper reasons for the crisis, which would originate in the paternalistic fixations of the whole epoch. Especially the biographer of Wolfgang Paalen, Andreas Neufert, represents the latter reading and wants to see the installation as a whole as symptom for an ideological shift inside surrealism away from Sigmund Freud´s rigid interpretation of the Oedipus complex towards Otto Rank´s theory of The Trauma of Birth with its recognition of the emotional nature of the child and its ties to the mother, which was represented at this time exclusively by Wolfgang Paalen and his wife, the poet Alice Rahon.

== Contemporary reception ==
The Exposition Internationale du Surréalism was a major cultural event which drew throngs of visitors. On the opening night, more than 3,000 people came to see the exhibition. Sometimes the jostling was so intense that the police had to take action. However, over the following days the exhibition, which was hyped as a spectacle, averaged more than 500 people per day. The exhibition attracted a mostly bourgeois audience, among which were many foreigners: "[The opening] was attended by the whole Parisian elite as well as a remarkable number of beautiful American women, German Jews and crazy old women from England [...] Never before have so many of the high society stepped on each other's toes [...]."

Before the opening, Raymond Cogniat had explicitly announced to the press that there would be an atmosphere of trepidation: "It is an ascension to a mysterious world, where the burlesque has less of a place than trepidation; where the laughing of the visitors covers up their inner unease; where even their anger lays bare their defeat. Surrealism is no game, it is obsession." The effect they hoped for reached only a few visitors; only in rare cases did anyone report having a "feeling of unease, of claustrophobia and the premonition of a terrible calamity", as Marie-Louise Fermet wrote in La Lumière. In Le Figaro littéraire, Jean Fraysee reported a simultaneous occurring of uncertainty, melancholia and black humour in the atmosphere – and so confirmed that the aims of the exhibitors had been reached.

However, the press strongly disapproved of the surrealist artists' "forced lunacy" [35], stating that the exhibition merely offered a "collection of sad jokes"[36]. Many journalists admitted that their reaction to the exhibits had been laughter, not as a means of hiding their fear but rather because they were reminded of a "carnival"[37]. A lot of reports also emphasized the exhibition's alleged harmlessness and denounced surrealism as "art without danger"[38]. The French magazine Paris Midi judged that the surrealists were no longer "enfants terribles", but rather "a group of nice boys" working in a "nostalgic and immature"[39] manner. Art historian Annabelle Görgen considered these reactions to contain "too much polemic to be taken as an expression of reserved amusement [...]. In fact, the laughter represented a defensive stance at least against the alogical."[40] In the end, she saw the newspapers' scathing criticism as a success for the surrealists since the artists explicitly wanted to evoke the kind of anger that had manifested itself in the reviews.

Most critics derided individual objects, thereby missing the point of the holistic concept of the exhibition. Even less prejudiced commentators such as Josef Breitenbach, one of the photographers who elaborately documented the exhibition, praised individual installations without getting anything out of the exhibition as a whole. He highly valued works by Duchamp, de Chirico, Miró, Ernst and others, but nevertheless summarised the exhibition as a "salad of exaggeratedness and bad taste".[41] This harsh judgment serves as an example for the fact that the innovative part of the exhibition, holistic production, was not recognized by contemporaries.

== Impact on art history ==
=== Photographers ===
Our knowledge of the exhibition is mainly conveyed by numerous photographs, such as works by Raoul Ubac, Josef Breitenbach, Robert Valencay, Man Ray, Denise Bellon and Thérèse Le Prat, who generally not only dealt with surrealistic mannequins in single pictures but in entire sequences.[15] In 1966 Man Ray documented the exhibition in a book. It was published as a limited edition in Paris by Jean Petithory with the title, "Résurrection des mannequins in Paris by Jean Petithory". Apart from an explanatory essay, the book contains fifteen silver-gelatine photograph prints.

=== The mannequin as an object of art ===
The surrealist artists had a special interest in mannequins. With these mannequins the art myth of Ovid's Pygmalion, a sculptor who carved the perfect woman, fell in love with her and then asked Venus to awaken her to life, is kept alive. Raoul Hausmann, who was an artist of Dadaism, which preceded Surrealism, had already created a mechanical head in 1919 named "The Spirit of Our Age". It was a decorated head of papier-mâché, such as hairdresser apprentices use to learn how to make wigs. Thus, the everyday item lost its common function and experienced a transformation into an artistic concept. Hausmann was involved in the first international Dada exhibition, which took place in 1920 in Berlin. The sculptor and photographer Hans Bellmer, who emigrated to Paris in 1938, was also a participant of the exhibition. He had been experimenting with mannequins since the beginning of the 1930s.

At the beginning of 2011 an exhibition called "surreal things" in the Schirn Art Gallery in Frankfurt showcased not only sculptures and objects from Dalí to Man Ray, but also documentary photographs of mannequins from Raoul Ubac and Denise Bellon. According to the Schirn art gallery, the objects testify to "the passion of the Surrealists for the iconography of the mannequin and reflect the desire to sexualise the body by means of surrealistic methods, such as combinatorics, veiling and exposure."

=== The exhibition as a final manifestation ===
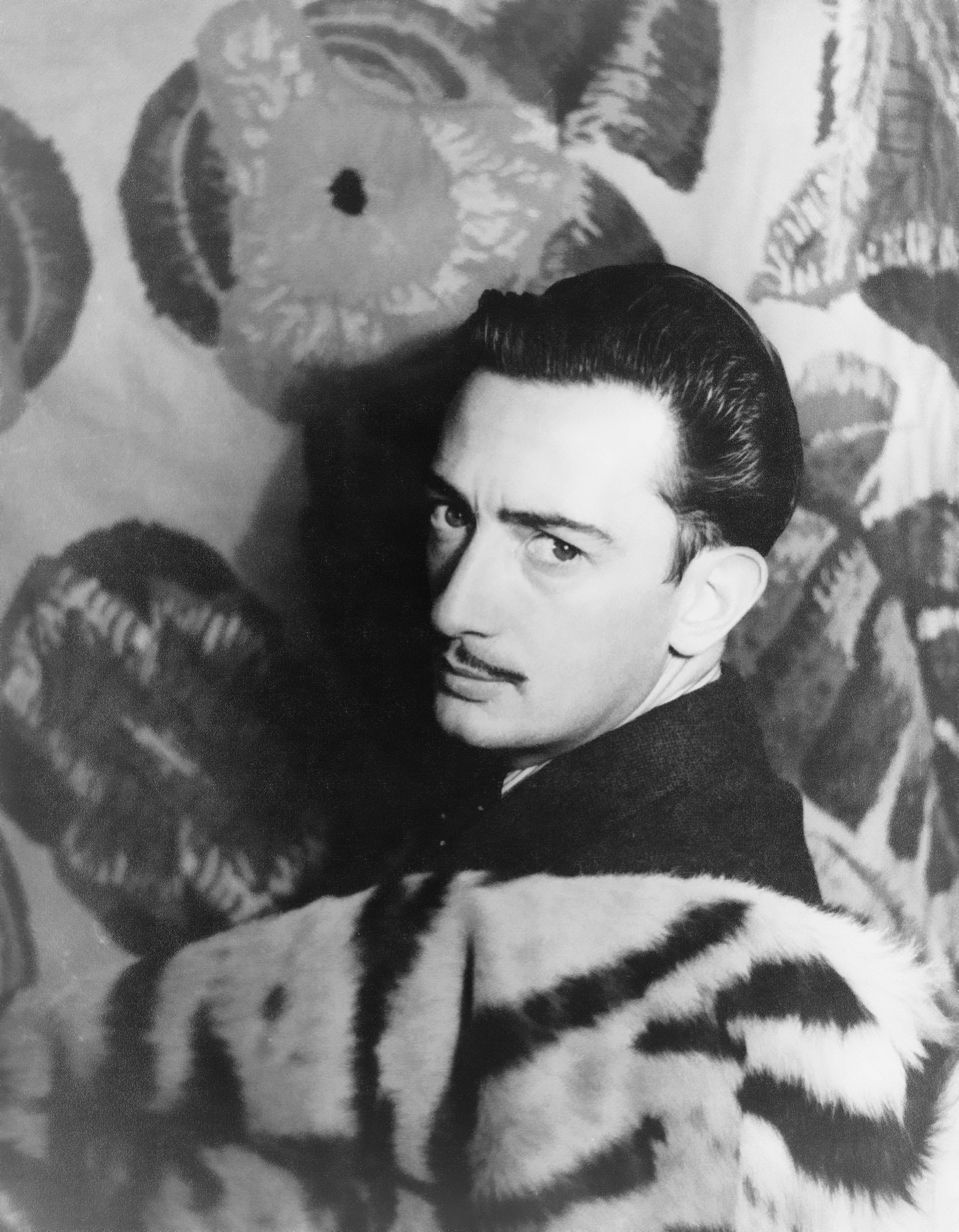
Salvador Dalí in 1939. Photographer: Carl van Vechten

Intentionally or not, the exhibition in 1938 turned out to be the last highlight and final manifestation of the surrealist movement. It had concentrated once again all of its energy in order to affirm its significance and potential for provocation. Political circumstances as well as personal, politically motivated differences (for example in 1938 between Breton and Éluard, who sympathized with Stalinism), led Éluard to leave the group of surrealists. Max Ernst and Man Ray followed suit out of solidarity [47]. The final break between Breton and Dalí followed in 1939, which sealed the temporary end of the surrealist community. During World War II many artists went into exile in the United States; their influence played a decisive role in future styles of art such as abstract expressionism, Neo-Dada and Pop Art [48]. In 1942, Breton and Duchamp, who had emigrated from France, organized the exhibition "First Papers of Surrealism" alongside Sidney Janis in Manhattan [49].

When Breton and Duchamp opened the exhibition "Le surréalisme en 1947" in the Galerie Maeght in Paris after the war, Breton referred back to the exhibition of 1938. He remarked that, on the one hand, the exhibition was supposed to represent the surrealist intention, which was situated on the boundary between poetry and reality, while, on the other hand, it was also supposed to manifest the spirit of 1938. According to Breton's biographer, Volker Zotz, the exhibition of 1947 did not, however, have the same effect as its Parisian forerunner in 1938 and was criticised for being too exclusive. He described post-war Surrealism as an "esoteric circle", while many pieces which had their origin in its roots had achieved world-wide recognition. Duchamp's biographer, Calvin Tomkins, described the exhibition as "the movement's last hurrah". He remarked that the post-war era had found different outlets, namely existentialism in Europe and abstract expressionism in the United States.

=== Influence on exhibitions since the 1960s ===
The rejection of modernist, white-walled galleries and the mise-en-scène, as well as the placing of equal emphasis on works of art and finds was a decisive forerunner of exhibitions and installations of the 1960s. In 1962, the Dylaby (dynamic labyrinth) exhibition at the Stedelijk Museum in Amsterdam built directly on the 1938 exhibition. Involved in Dylaby were Jean Tinguely, Daniel Spoerri, Robert Rauschenberg, Martial Raysse, Niki de Saint Phalle, Per Olof Ultvedt, and its organiser Pontus Hultén. The room and exhibition as part of the artwork established itself as "a medium unto itself within the medium of the exhibition, which emerged out of surrealist practice." Among the exhibitors that helped, "based on surrealist practice, to establish the exhibition as a medium", was the BEUYS exhibition by the sculptor Joseph Beuys at the Abteiberg Museum in Mönchengladbach, Germany (Sept-Oct 1967), along with '503 (1600 Cubic Feet) Level Dirt' by Walter De Maria (Sept-Oct 1968) at the Heiner Friedrich Gallery in Munich, and 'Senza titolo (Dodici cavelli vivi)' by Jannis Kounellis, who, in 1969, put twelve lively horses on display at the Galleria L'Attico in Rome. As a result, the exhibitions of the 1980s emerged.

=== Reconstructions ===
From March to May 1995 the Ubu gallery in New York, which was founded just the year before, paid homage to the ground-breaking 1938 exhibition. Exhibits, photographs and Duchamp's installation from the main room were shown.

The Wilhelm-Hack museum in Ludwigshafen presented another retrospective in the context of their exhibition with the title Gegen jede Vernunft. Surrealismus Paris-Prag im Jahr 2009/10 ("Against all reason. Surrealism Paris-Prague in 2009/10"). Exhibited was a partial reproduction: the main room as decorated by Marcel Duchamp featured sacks of coal mounted on the ceiling, leaves on the floor, a brazier and a bed, as well as paintings on the wall. An audio track filled the room with the sounds of marching soldiers and hysterical laughter. Just as in 1938 the visitors were forced to explore the room with a flashlight.

The Fondation Beyeler in Riehen near Basel showed the first comprehensive surrealist exhibition in Switzerland from October 2, 2011, until January 29, 2012. The visitors were guided through the exhibition, as in 1938, by imitation Parisian street signs with fictitious or real names. The title of the exhibition is Dalí, Magritte, Miró - Surrealismus in Paris ("Dalí, Magritte, Miró - Surrealism in Paris").

=== Later surveys ===
In 2021–2022, The Metropolitan Museum of Art and Tate Modern co-organized the international survey exhibition Surrealism Beyond Borders. In the exhibition catalogue, the editors situate the 1938 Exposition internationale du surréalisme within a retrospectively numbered series of eleven exhibitions organized by André Breton between 1935 and 1965, describe the 1938 Paris exhibition (together with the 1942 New York show) as a turning point toward immersive, environment-based exhibition-making, and argue that repeated Paris iterations helped produce blind spots in later narratives that the project seeks to address. In the catalogue foreword, Met director Max Hollein and Tate Modern director Frances Morris characterize the exhibition as remarkable and the broader project as groundbreaking.

== Bibliography ==
- André Breton, Paul Éluard. Dictionnaire abrégé du surréalisme. Photographies, illustrations, lettrines. Éditions Corti, Paris 1938, Faksimileausgabe 1991, ISBN 2-7143-0421-4
- Annabelle Görgen. Exposition internationale du Surréalisme, Paris 1938. Bluff und Täuschung – Die Ausstellung als Werk. Einflüsse aus dem 19. Jahrhundert unter dem Aspekt der Kohärenz. Schreiber, Munich 2008, ISBN 978-3-88960-074-5
- Bernd Klüser, Katharina Hegewisch (eds). Die Kunst der Ausstellung. Eine Dokumentation dreißig exemplarischer Kunstausstellungen dieses Jahrhunderts. Insel, Frankfurt a. M./ Leipzig 1991, ISBN 3-458-16203-8
- Alyce Mahon. Surrealism and the Politics of Eros, 1938–1968. Thames & Hudson, London, 2005, ISBN 0500238219
- Uwe M. Schneede. Die Geschichte der Kunst im 20. Jahrhundert. Von den Avantgarden bis zur Gegenwart. C. H. Beck, Munich 2001, ISBN 3-406-48197-3
- Uwe M. Schneede. Die Kunst des Surrealismus. Malerei, Skulptur, Dichtung, Fotografie, Film. C.H. Beck, Munich 2006, ISBN 978-3-406-54683-9
- Reinhard Spieler, Barbara Auer (eds). Gegen jede Vernunft. Surrealismus Paris – Prag. Exhibition catalog, Belser, Stuttgart 2009, ISBN 978-3-7630-2537-4
- Calvin Tomkins. Marcel Duchamp. Eine Biographie. Hanser, Munich, special edition 2005, ISBN 3-446-20110-6
- Volker Zotz. André Breton. Rowohlt, Reinbek bei Hamburg 1990, ISBN 3-499-50374-3
