= Juliette Lasserre =

Swiss-German photographer and translator

Juliette Lasserre, (née Ilse Juliette Ziegert; 14 April 1907 – 9 July 2007), was a Swiss–German photographer and literary translator.

== Youth ==
Juliette Lasserre was born on 14 April 1907 in Plainpalais, Geneva. Her parents were Maximilian Ziegert (1863–1913) and Ilse Grund (1880–1928). She was the youngest of their four children. Her three brothers were Hellmuth Ziegert (1899–1949), Erich Ziegert (1900–1978) and Hans-Peter Ziegert (1902–1977). Her father died prematurely in 1913. In the mid-1920s she began training as a kindergarten teacher. She then trained as a photographer at the Lette-Haus in Berlin and also worked for Karlheinz Martin at the Volksbühne in Berlin.

== Professional career ==
About a year after her mother's suicide, Juliette Lasserre moved to Paris in 1929 to join her aunt Helen Hessel and her uncle Franz Hessel, who were both living in a ménage à trois with Henri-Pierre Roché. She found work as an assistant to Germaine Krull and married the Swiss sculptor André Lasserre in 1933, thus obtaining Swiss nationality. The couple initially lived in a studio house at 147 rue Broca, until Juliette Lasserre opened a photography studio on rue de Seine in the late 1930s. She met the Italian-American photographer Maria Eisner who, with Pierre Boucher and René Zuber, had founded the Alliance-Photo photographic agency in December 1934. Juliette Lasserre's name appears on the letterhead of the agency, 125 rue du Faubourg-Saint-Honoré. Her clients include the dressmaker Louise Bourbon and the couturiers Jacques Heim, Kostio de War, and Vanina de War.

Juliette Lasserre published her photographs in the mid-1930s in the fashion magazine Heim of the fashion house Jacques Heim. Between 1937 and 1938, she worked continuously on photographic reportages for the communist magazine Regards, thus exhibiting a socio-critical focus, and provided photographic contributions to the daily press. In February 1940, Juliette and André Lasserre obtained the French nationality they had applied for.

On 26 September 1939, the French Communist Party, of which the Lasserres were members, was banned. Their friends included Reynold Thiel and Lulu and Maurice Magis, a Belgian bookseller couple. After a stay in Germany and because of Juliette Lasserre's work at the Alliance-Photo agency, the couple was watched by the Sûreté and finally arrested in early April 1940 after military documents were found in the apartment above the photographic studio on rue de Seine. When the city was occupied by German troops on 14 June 1940, the couple had already been transferred to Toulon and were awaiting trial. On 10 March 1941, both were sentenced to death by Judge Gaulène. They were also deprived of their newly acquired French nationality. Thanks to the intervention of Juliette Lasserre's brother, Hellmuth Ziegert, a captain in the Wehrmacht, the couple were freed and left France to take refuge in Potsdam with Juliette Lasserre's second brother, Erich Ziegert, an art dealer and member of the Nazi Party. Ideological tensions forced the Lasserres to leave Potsdam for Bavaria where they managed to survive until the end of the war, living near Prien am Chiemsee.

On their return to Paris, the judgement against the couple on 10 March was revived. After a long trial, Juliette Lasserre was expelled from the country and André Lasserre remained in prison until 1951. After the war, Juliette Lasserre found work for the Münchner Zeitung through the intervention of Hans Habe and went to London in 1949. In 1952, Juliette and André Lasserre divorced. From 1951 to 1956, Juliette Lasserre worked for Bernsen's International Press Service (BIPS) and for two years managed the offices in Hamburg, Munich, Cologne and Berlin. In the meantime, she became a translator, also in cooperation with Hedda Eulenberg, and wrote articles for the press. At the beginning of the 1960s, she returned to her native country and worked for a while for the Swiss women's magazine Annabelle. She spent the rest of her life near Locarno and died at the age of 100 on 9 July 2007 in Muralto, in the canton of Ticino.

== Photographic work ==
When Juliette Lasserre arrived in Paris at the end of the 1920s, she quickly found her place in the Parisian art scene thanks to her aunt Helen Hessel, Germaine Krull and her future husband André Lasserre. Her new circle of friends included artists, writers, actors and gallery owners such as Chaïm Soutine, Francis Picabia, Man Ray, André Breton, Louis Aragon, Paul Eluard, Jean-Louis Barrault, Pablo Picasso, Antonin Artaud, Raymond Rouleau, Robert Desnos and Léopold Zborowski. The photographic reports she published in the 1930s in the communist weekly Regards bear witness to her great commitment to themes such as poverty, old age, childhood and labour. In 1937, she exhibited her series of photographs Visages d'enfants at Joseph Billiet's gallery.

In addition to her work for the press and her exhibitions, she also found clients in the world of fashion designers. She created collages for the aforementioned fashion magazine Heim, some of which were done in collaboration with Dora Maar and Dora Kallmus, alias Madame d'Ora. The influence of surrealism is recognisable. In the years following the Second World War, she continued to devote herself to both social and human themes, such as the destruction, expulsions and atrocities of the war in Germany and Europe.

Her photographic archive is believed to be lost.

== Exhibitions ==
- 1934: Galerie de la Pléïade, group exhibition, 73, Boulevard Saint-Michel, Paris.
- 1935: Musée des Arts Décoratifs at the Pavillon de Marsan, Exposition Internationale de la Photographie Contemporaine, Paris.
- 1937 : Galerie Billiet-Worms, Visages d'Enfants, 30, Rue La Boëtie, Paris.
- 1937 : Galerie de l'art et industrie, Exhibition of Photography, Paris.

== Publications ==
=== Translations ===
- Vincent van Gogh, 1948, Aus den Briefen an seinen Bruder. Translated into German by Juliette Lasserre and Rudolf Schröder, Drei Eulen Verlag, Düsseldorf
- François Porché, 1954, Leo Tolstoy. Die Wahrheit über sein Leben. Original title: Portrait psychologique de Tolstoï. Translated into German by Hedda Eulenberg and Juliette Lasserre. Droste Verlag, Düsseldorf
- Peter Abrahams, 1956, ...dort wo die weissen Schatten fallen. Original title: Tell Freedom: Memories of Africa. Translated into German by Juliette Lasserre and Eva Kuhn, Europäische Verlagsanstalt, Frankfurt
- Peter Abrahams, 1961, Schwarzer Mann im weissen Dschungel. Original title: Mine Boy. Translated into German by Juliette Lasserre and Eva Kuhn, Rex Verlag, Munich

=== Articles ===
- Les Gitans d'Autriche sous l'occupation nazie. Monde Gitan, number 20, 1971, Association Notre-Dame des Gitans, 99, Rue du Bac, Paris 7ème.
- Brutalités policières à Lille. Monde Gitan, number 25, 1973, Association Notre-Dame des Gitans, 99, Rue du Bac, Paris 7ème.
