= Denise Bellon =

French photographer

- Born: Denise Hulmann; 20 September 1902; Paris, France
- Died: 31 October 1999 (aged 97); Paris, France
- Education: University of Paris
- Occupation: Photographer

Denise Bellon (20 September 1902 – 31 October 1999) was a French photographer associated with the Surrealist movement.

== Life ==
She was born Denise Hulmann in Paris and studied psychology at the Sorbonne. She first married Jacques Bellon although the couple later divorced. Bellon began work as a photographer with Pierre Boucher. From 1934 to 1940, she was part of the team of photographers at the Alliance-Photo agency founded by Maria Eisner. In 1940, she married Armand Labin|fr. He founded the newspaper Midi Libre; she worked for the paper as a photographer. During the Nazi occupation of France, from 1940, she lived in Lyon. From 1946 until 1956 when she returned to Paris, Bellon lived in Montpellier.

She was photographer for the International Exhibitions of Surrealism held in 1938, 1947, 1959 and 1965. Bellon also photographed various Surrealist artists and their works, including Joan Miró, Yves Tanguy, Marcel Duchamp, and Marcel Jean.

She was the mother of French actress Loleh Bellon and French film-maker Yannick Bellon.

Bellon died in Paris at the age of 97.

In 2001, her daughter Yannick and Chris Marker made a film Le souvenir d'un avenir (Remembrance of Things to Come) based on images from Bellon's archives.
