= Yves Tanguy =

French painter (1900–1955)

- Tanguy in 1938
- Born: Raymond Georges Yves Tanguy; 5 January 1900; Paris, France
- Died: 15 January 1955 (aged 55); Woodbury, Connecticut, US
- Known for: Painting
- Movement: Surrealism
- Patrons: Pierre Matisse

Raymond Georges Yves Tanguy (5 January 1900 – 15 January 1955), known as just Yves Tanguy (/ˈiːv tɒ̃ˈɡiː/; French: [iv tɑ̃ɡi]), was a French Surrealist painter, known for his abstract landscapes.

== Biography ==
Tanguy was the son of Félix Tanguy, a retired navy captain, and Anne-Marie Tanguy, and was born 5 January 1900, at the Ministry of Naval Affairs on Place de la Concorde in Paris. His parents were both of Breton origin. After his father's death in 1908, his mother moved back to her native Locronan, Finistère, and he ended up spending much of his youth living with various relatives.

Giorgio de Chirico, The Child's Brain (1914), oil on canvas, 65 cm × 80 cm (26 in × 31 in)

In 1918, Tanguy briefly joined the merchant navy before being drafted into the Army, where he befriended Jacques Prévert. At the end of his military service in 1922, he returned to Paris, where he worked various odd jobs. He stumbled upon Giorgio de Chirico's painting The Child's Brain (1914) and was so deeply impressed he resolved to become a painter himself in spite of his complete lack of formal training.

Tanguy had a habit of being completely absorbed by the current painting he was working on. This way of creating artwork may have been due to his very small studio which only had enough room for one wet piece.

Through his friend Prévert, in around 1924 Tanguy was introduced into the circle of Surrealist artists around André Breton. Tanguy quickly began to develop his own unique painting style, giving his first solo exhibition in Paris in 1927, and marrying his first wife Jeannette Ducrocq (b. 1896, d. 1977) later that same year. During this busy time of his life, Breton gave Tanguy a contract to paint 12 pieces a year. With his fixed income, he painted less and ended up creating only eight works of art for Breton.

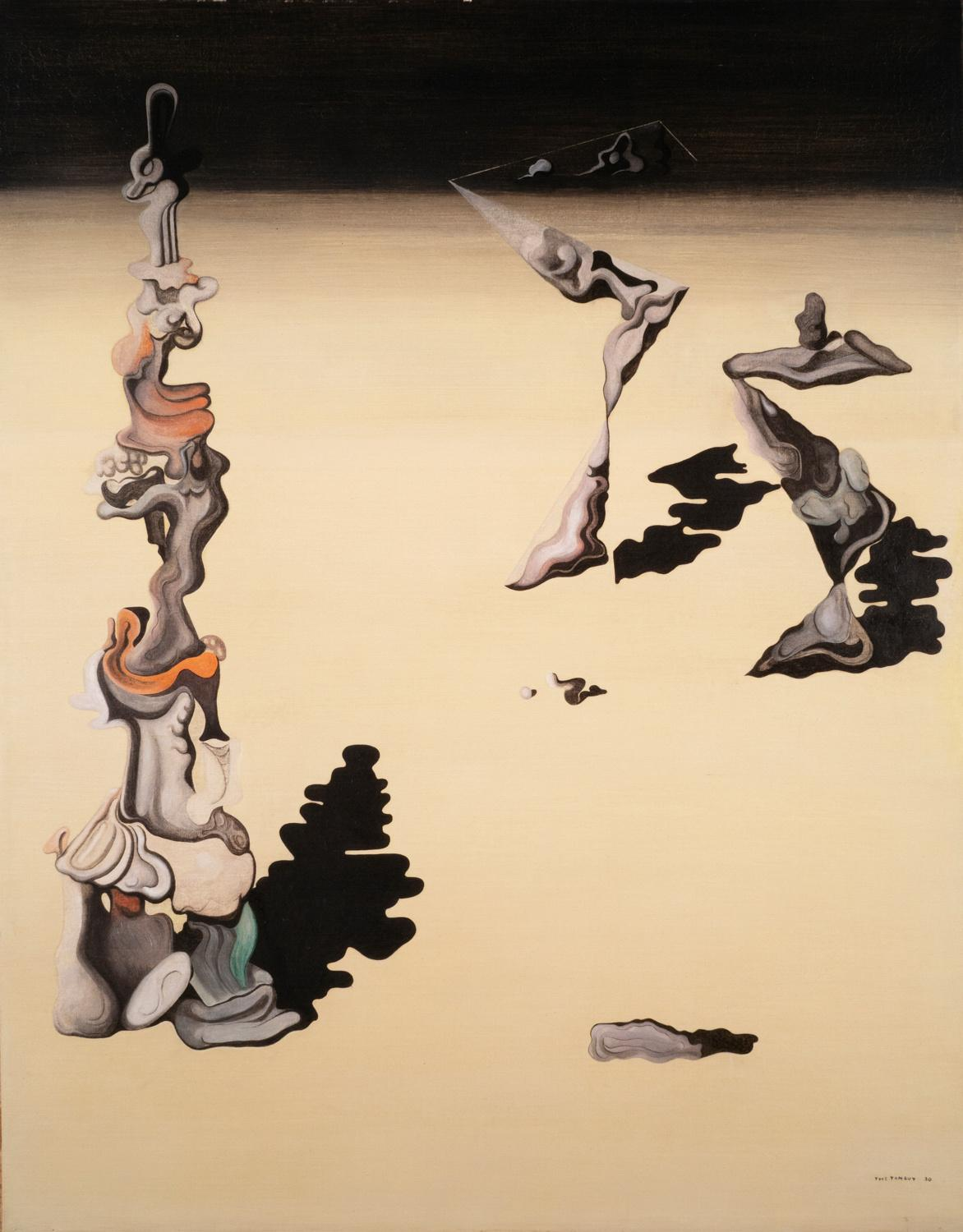
Fraud in the Garden (1930), oil on canvas, 92 cm × 73 cm (36 in × 29 in)

On 3 December 1930, at an early screening of Luis Buñuel and Salvador Dalí's film L'Age d'Or, activists from the right-wing Ligue des patriotes stormed the lobby of the cinema where the film was being screened and destroyed artworks by Dalí, Joan Miró, Man Ray and other Surrealist artists – Tanguy's painting Fraud in the Garden (1930) was among those slashed. The piece has since been restored.

Throughout the 1930s, Tanguy adopted the bohemian lifestyle of the struggling artist with gusto, leading eventually to the failure of his first marriage. He had an intense affair with Peggy Guggenheim in 1938 when he went to London with his wife Jeannette Ducrocq to hang his first retrospective exhibition in Britain at her gallery Guggenheim Jeune. The exhibition was a great success and Guggenheim wrote in her autobiography that "Tanguy found himself rich for the first time in his life". She purchased his pictures Toilette de L'Air and The Sun in Its Jewel Case (Le Soleil dans son écrin) for her collection. Tanguy also painted Peggy two earrings. The affair continued in both London and Paris and only finished when Tanguy met a fellow Surrealist artist who would become his second wife.

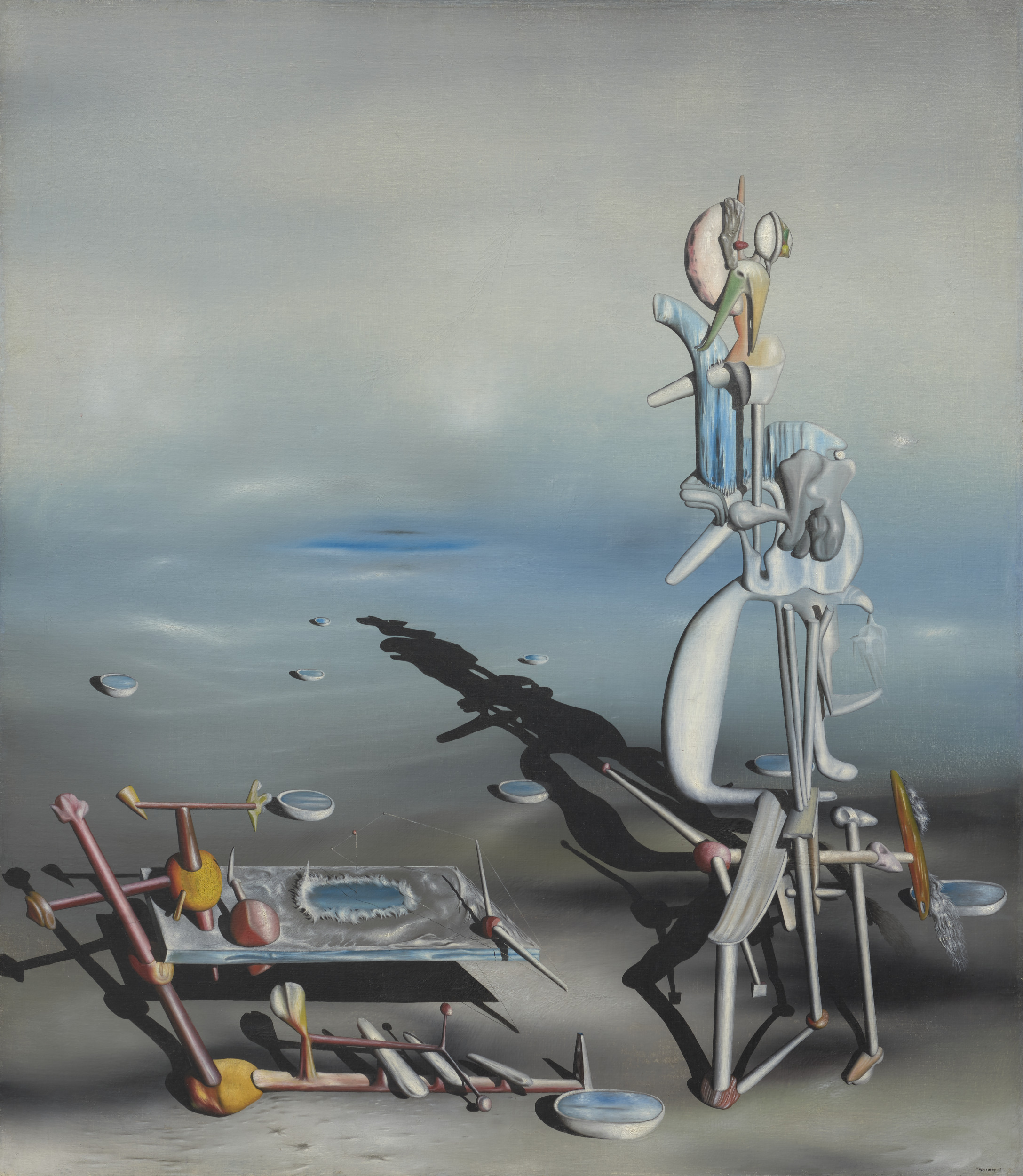
Indefinite Divisibility (1942), oil on canvas, 102 cm × 89 cm (40 in × 35 in)

In 1938, after seeing the work of fellow artist Kay Sage, Tanguy began a relationship which led to his second marriage. With the outbreak of World War II, Sage moved back to her native New York, and Tanguy, judged unfit for military service, followed her. He would spend the rest of his life in the United States. Sage and Tanguy were married in Reno, Nevada, on August 17, 1940. Their marriage proved durable but tense. Both drank heavily, and Tanguy assaulted Sage verbally and sometimes physically, pushing her and sometimes even threatening her with a knife privately and at social gatherings. Sage, according to friends' accounts, made no response to her husband's aggression. Toward the end of the war, the couple moved to Woodbury, Connecticut, converting an old farmhouse into an artists' studio. They spent the rest of their lives there. In 1948, he became a naturalized citizen of the United States.

In January 1955, Tanguy suffered a fatal stroke at Woodbury. His body was cremated and his ashes preserved until Sage's death in 1963. They were later scattered by his friend Pierre Matisse on the beach at Douarnenez in his beloved Brittany, together with those of his wife.

== Style and legacy ==
But with Tanguy, it will be a new horizon, one in front of which the no longer physical landscape will spread out.

— André Breton

Tanguy's paintings have a recognizable style of nonrepresentational Surrealism. They show vast, abstract landscapes, mostly in a tightly limited palette of colors, occasionally showing flashes of contrasting color accents. Typically, these landscapes are populated with various abstract shapes, sometimes angular and sharp, sometimes with an organic look to them.

Giorgio de Chirico, The Disquieting Muses, (1947, replica of 1916 original), oil on canvas, 66.36 cm × 97.79 cm (26.125 in × 38.5 in)

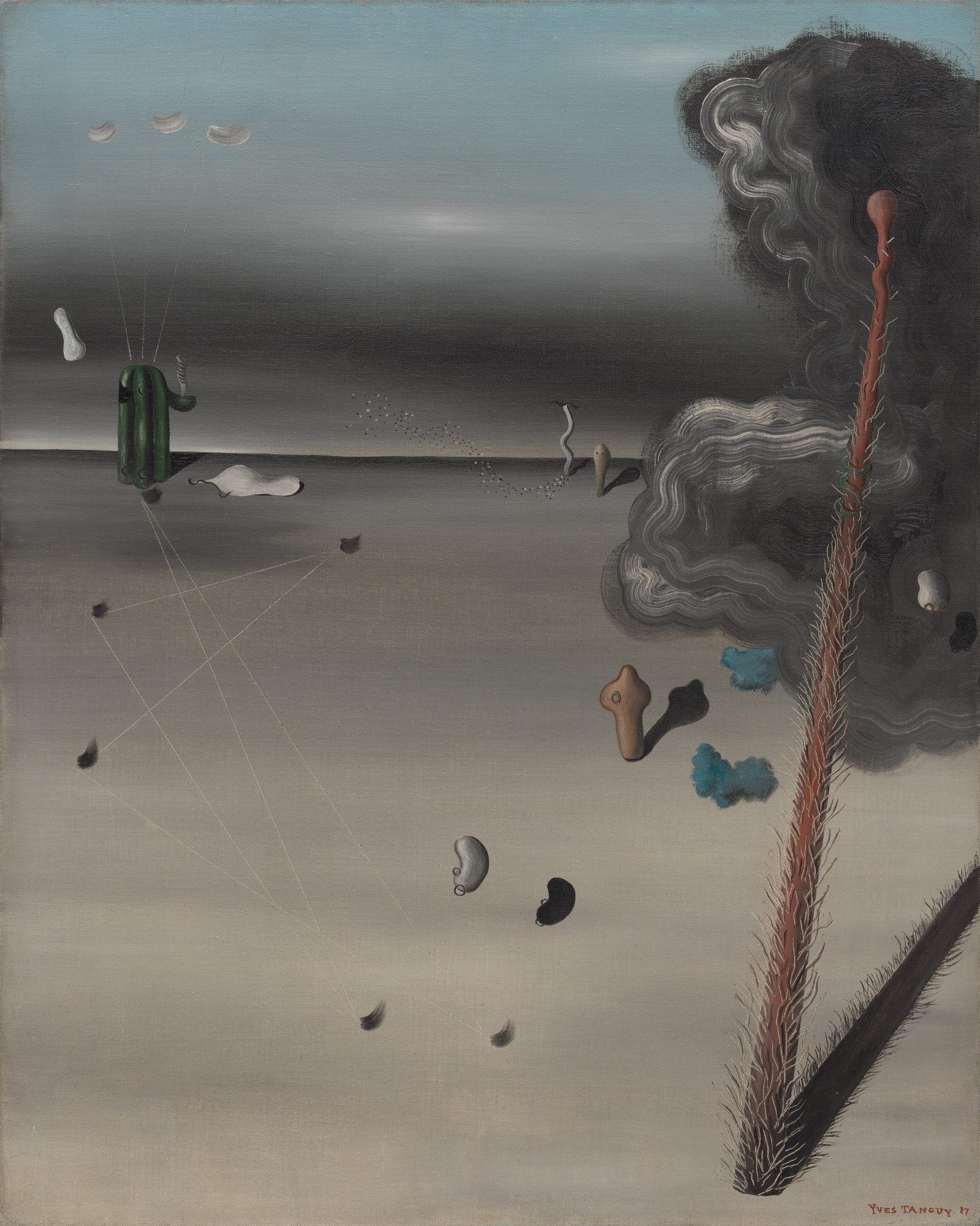
Mama, Papa is Wounded! (1927), oil on canvas, 92.1 cm × 73 cm (36.3 in × 28.7 in)

According to Nathalia Brodskaïa, Mama, Papa is Wounded! (1927) is one of Tanguy's most impressive paintings. Brodskaïa writes that the painting reflects his debt to Giorgio de Chirico – falling shadows and a classical torso – and conjures up a sense of doom: the horizon, the emptiness of the plain, the solitary plant, the smoke, the helplessness of the small figures. Tanguy said that it was an image he saw entirely in his imagination before starting to paint it. He also claimed he took the title of this and other works from psychiatric textbooks: "I remember spending a whole afternoon with ... André Breton," he said, "leafing through books on psychiatry in the search for statements of patients which could be used as titles for paintings." Jennifer Mundy discovered that the title of this painting and several others were taken from a book about paranormal phenomena, Traité de metaphysique (1922) by Dr Charles Richet.

Tanguy's style was an important influence on several younger painters, such as Roberto Matta, Wolfgang Paalen, Toyen, and Esteban Francés, who adopted a Surrealist style in the 1930s. Later, Tanguy's paintings (and, less directly, those of de Chirico) influenced the style of the 1980 French animated movie Le Roi et l'oiseau, by Paul Grimault and Prévert. Tanguy's works also influenced the science fiction cover art of illustrator Richard Powers.

=== In popular culture ===
Tanguy's The Invisibles was a key plot point in the third episode of the second series of BBC Two comedy-drama There She Goes.

== Partial list of paintings ==
=== 1920s ===
- Vite! Vite! (1924)
- Rue de la Santé (1925) The Museum of Modern Art, New York
- Self Portrait (1925) Private Collection
- Dancing (1925) Private Collection
- The Testament of Jacques Prévert (1925) Private Collection
- Fantômas (1925–1926) Private Collection
- The Storm (1926)
- The Lighthouse (1926) Private Collection, France
- The Girl with Red Hair (1926) Private Collection
- Title Unknown (The Giantess, The Ladder) (1926) Private Collection
- I Came As I Had Promised. Adieu (1926) Dieter Scharf Collection Foundation
- The Storm (Black Landscape) (1926) Philadelphia Museum of Art
- Woman Dreaming (Sleeping) (1926) Private Collection
- Composition (1927) Private Collection
- Large Painting Representing a Landscape (1927) Private Collection
- Death Watching His Family (1927) Thyssen-Bornemisza Museum, Madrid
- Second Message II (Third Message) (1927) Private Collection
- Someone Is Ringing (1927) Private Collection, Switzerland
- There! (The Evening Before) (1927) Menil Collection, Houston
- He Did What He Wanted (1927) Richard S Zisler Collection, New York
- Shadow Country (1927) The Detroit Institute of Arts
- Mama, Papa is Wounded! (1927) The Museum of Modern Art, New York
- Extinction of Useless Lights (1927) The Museum of Modern Art, New York
- The Hand in the Clouds (1927) Staatsgalerie Stuttgart
- Finish What I Have Begun (1927) Private Collection
- Belomancy I (1927) Museo Nacional Centro de Arte Reina Sofia, Madrid
- Surrealist Landscape (1927) Staatliche Kunsthalle Karlsruhe
- Title Unknown (Surrealist Composition) (1927) Ulla and Heiner Pietzsch Collection, Berlin
- Title Unknown (He Comes) (1928) Private Collection
- Old Horizon (1928) National Gallery of Australia, Canberra
- Unspoken Depths (1928) Private Collection
- The Dark Garden (1928) Kunstsammlung Nordrhein-Westfalen, Düsseldorf
- Tomorrow They Shoot Me (1928) Sara Hildén Art Museum, Tampere, Finland
- Tabernacle (1928)
- Landscape with Red Cloud (1928) Private Collection
- Title Unknown (1928) Cleveland Museum of Art
- Indifferent Drouning/Indifferent Walnut Tree (1929) Private Collection
- Perfect Balance (1929) Gunter Sachs Collection
- Outside (1929) Scottish National Gallery of Modern Art, Edinburgh
- Lit Bleu (1929) Private Collection
- Inspiration (1929) Museum of Fine Arts of Rennes, France
- L'Avion (1929)
- The Look of Amber (1929) The National Gallery of Art, Washington DC
- The Lovers (1929) Museum Folkwang, Essen
- Derive d'Azur (1929) Museum Ludwig, Köln
- Out of the Blue (1929) Private Collection
- The Lurid Sky (1929) Mount Holyoke College Museum
- Views (1929) Private Collection
- Satin Pillow (1929) Art Gallery of Ontario, Toronto
- At 4 O'Clock in the Summer, Hope (1929) Musée National d'Art Moderne, Paris

=== 1930s ===
- Cloud (1930) Private Collection
- La Splendeur Semblable (1930)
- Neither Legends Nor Figures (1930) Menil Collection, Houston
- Clouds of Earth (The Man) (1930) Private Collection
- Similar Resplendence (1930) Kunstmuseum, Basel
- Tower of the West (1931) Kunstmuseum Winterthur
- Promontory Palace (1931) Peggy Guggenheim Collection, Venice
- The Armoire of Proteus (1931) Private Collection
- Four-Part Screen (The Firmament) (1932) Berardo Collection, Lisbon
- The Heart of the Tower (1933) Private Collection
- The Certitude of the Never-Seen (1933) The Art Institute of Chicago
- Between the Grass and the Wind (1934) Private Collection
- The End of the Rope (1934) Private Collection
- I Am Waiting for You (1934) Los Angeles County Museum of Art
- The Passage of a Smile (1935) The Toledo Museum of Art
- Échelles (1935) Manchester Art Gallery
- The Meeting-Place of Parallels (1935) Kunstmuseum, Basel
- Title Unknown (Metaphysical Landscape) (1935) Staatsgalerie Stuttgart
- Palming (1935) Private Collection, Hamburg
- The New Nomads (1935) John and Mable Ringling Museum of Art, Sarasota
- The Geometer of Dreams (1935) Private Collection
- Untitled (1935) Collection of Carlo F. Bilotti
- Heredity of Acquired Characteristics (1936) Menil Collection, Houston
- L'Extinction des Especes (1936)
- From the Other Side of the Bridge (1936) Private Collection, New York
- The Nest of the Amphioxus (1936) Museum of Grenoble
- Treasures of the Sea (1936) Private Collection
- Fragile (1936)
- Way of Heredity (1936) Private Collection
- The Air in Her Mirror (1937) Sprengel Museum, Hanover
- Les Filles des Conséquences (1937)
- The Doubter (The Interrogation) (1937) Hirshhorn Museum and Sculpture Garden, Washington DC
- The Sun in its Jewel Case (1937) Peggy Guggenheim Collection, Venice
- Lingering Day (1937) Musée National d'Art Moderne, Centre Pompidou, Paris
- Movements and Acts (1937) Smith College Museum of Art
- Title Unknown (Landscape) (1938) Private Collection
- Familiar Little Person (1938) Musée National d'Art Moderne, Centre Pompidou, Paris
- Ennui and Tranquility (1938) Private Collection
- Boredom and tranquillity (1938) The Jeffrey H. Loria Collection
- Hidden Thoughts (My Hidden Thoughts) (1939) San Francisco Museum of Modern Art
- If it Were (1939) Private Collection
- La Rue aux Levres (1939)
- The Furniture of Time (1939) The Museum of Modern Art, New York
- The Great Nacre Butterfly (1939) Private Collection
- Second Thoughts (1939) San Francisco Museum of Modern Art
- Satin Tuning-Fork (1939) Collection of Mr and Mrs Jacques Gelman

=== 1940s ===
- The Satin Tuning Fork (1940)
- Belomancy II (1940) Private Collection
- The Witness (1940) Collection of Mr and Mrs Frederick R. Weisman
- A Little Later (1940) Private Collection
- The Earth and the Air (1941) Baltimore Museum of Art
- On Slanting Ground (1941) Peggy Guggenheim Collection, Venice
- The Five Strangers (1941) Wadsworth Atheneum, Hartford
- Twice The Black (1941) Private Collection
- The Palace of the Windowed Rocks (1942) Musée National d'Art Moderne, Centre Pompidou, Paris
- Naked Water (1942) Hirshhorn Museum and Sculpture Garden, Washington DC
- The Long Rain (1942) Honolulu Museum of Art
- Indefinite Divisibility (1942) Albright-Knox Art Gallery, Buffalo
- The Absent Lady (1942) Kunstsammlung Nordrhein-Westfalen, Düsseldorf
- The Great Mutation (1942) The Museum of Modern Art, New York
- Slowly Toward the North (1942) The Museum of Modern Art, New York
- The Stone in the Tree (1942) The Arizona State University Art Museum, Tempe
- Minotaur (1943) Fundació Joan Miró, Barcelona
- Through Birds, Through Fire and Not Through Glass (1943) The Minneapolis Institute of Arts
- Reply to Red (1943) The Minneapolis Institute of Arts
- Zones D'Instabilite (1943)
- Equicocal Colors (1943) Private Collection
- The Prodigal Never Returns I (1943) Collection of Mr and Mrs Leonard Yaseen
- The Prodigal Never Returns II (1943) Collection of Mr and Mrs Leonard Yaseen
- The Prodigal Never Returns III (1943) Collection of Mr and Mrs Leonard Yaseen
- The Prodigal Never Returns IV (1943) Collection of Mr and Mrs Leonard Yaseen
- Distances (1944) Private Collection
- Twice (1944) Private Collection
- The Tower of the Sea (1944) Washington University Gallery of Art, St Louis
- My Life, White and Black (1944) Collection of Mr and Mrs Jacques Gelman
- The Rapidity of Sleep (1945) The Art Institute of Chicago, Chicago
- There, Motion Has Not Yet Ceased (1945) Richard S Zeisler Collection, Guggenheim, New York
- There the Mouth has not Ceased Yet (1945) Collection of Richard S. Zeisler
- The Provider (1945) Private Collectio
- Hands and Gloves (1946) Musée d'Art Moderne de Saint-Etienne
- Clothed in Wakefulness (1947) Collection of Mr and Mrs Isidore M. Cohen
- There Is (1947) Private Collection
- At the Risk of the Sun (1947) Nelson Gallery - Atkins Museum, Kansas City
- From One Night to Another (1947) de Young Museum, San Francisco
- First Stone (1947) Private Collection
- Who Will Answer (1948) Collection of Mr and Mrs Herbert Lust
- Fear (1949) Whitney Museum of American Art, New York

=== 1950s ===
- Rose of the Four Winds (1950) Wadsworth Atheneum, Hartford
- The Immense Window (1950) Private Collection
- From Pale Hands to Weary Skies (1950) Yale University Art Gallery
- To look at in Winter (1950) Smith College Museum of Art
- Unlimited Sequences (1951) Pennsylvania Academy of Fine Arts, Philadelphia
- The Invisibles / The Transparent Ones (1951) Tate Modern, London
- The Hunted Sky (1951) Menil Collection, Houston
- Time Without Change (1951) University of Arizona Museum of Art, Tucson
- The Stars in Open-Work (1951) The Art Institute of Chicago
- Because (1951) Williams College Museum of Art
- This Morning (1951) Collection of Nesuhi Ertegun
- Through the Forest (1952)
- The Mirage of Time (1954) The Metropolitan Museum of Art, New York
- The Saltimbanques (1954) Richard L Feigen, New York
- Imaginary Numbers (1954) Thyssen-Bornemisza Museum, Madrid
- From Green to White (1954) Collection of Mr and Mrs Jacques Gelman
- Multiplication of the Arcs (1954) The Museum of Modern Art, New York

== Bibliography ==
- Acquavella, Nicholas M. and John Ashbery. 1974. Yves Tanguy. Acquavella Galleries, Inc. New York. unpaginated.
- Anonymous. 2001. An Important Private Collection of Works by Yves Tanguy, May 10, 2001. Christie's New York. 72 pp.
- Berggruen, Olivier. 2002. Yves Tanguy, Peintre De L'Illusion Métaphysique in Yves Tanguy, Malingue (2002), pp. 9–13.
- Breton, André. 1942. What Tanguy Veils and Reveals. View 2(2): 4–7 pp.
- Le Bihan, Rene, Mabin Renée & Sawin Martica. 2001. Yves Tanguy (French). Editions Palantines. ISBN 291143417X / ISBN 9782911434174
- Le Bihan, René, Olivier Berggruen, and Jean-Jacques Lebel. 2002. Yves Tanguy (French). Galerie Malingue, Paris. 108 pp. ISBN 978-2951832305
- Marchesseau, Daniel. 1973. Yves Tanguy (French). Éditions Filipacchi, Paris, 68 pp. [German Ed. 1974. Rembrandt-Verlag, Berlin]
- Maur, Karin von. 2001. Yves Tanguy and Surrealism. Hatie Cantz Publications. Ostfildern-Ruit, Germany. 252 pp. ISBN 3-7757-0968-1 [with essays by *Susan Davidson, Konrad Klapheck, Gordon Onslow Ford, Andreas Schalhorn, and Beate Wolf].
- Miller, Stephen Robeson and Jonathan Stuhlman. 2011. Double Solitaire: The Surreal Worlds of Kay Sage and Yves Tanguy. The Katonah Museum of Art and the Mint Museum with the Pierre Matisse Foundation, New York. 104 pp. ISBN 0983194211
- Schalhorn, Andreas (2001). "Yves Tanguy 1900–55". In Karin von Maur (ed.). Yves Tanguy and Surrealism. Hatje Cantz. ISBN 3-7757-0968-1.
- Soby, James Thrall. 1955. Yves Tanguy. Museum of Modern Art. New York, N. Y. 72 pp. (2nd Ed. 1977: ISBN 978-1299276611).
- Klingsöhr-Leroy, Cathrin (2004). Grosenick, Uta (ed.). Surealism. Taschen. ISBN 978-3-8228-2215-9 – via Internet Archive.
- Wittrock, Wolfgang and Stanley W. Hayter. 1976. Yves Tanguy: The Graphic Work (German). Wittrock Kunsthandel, Düsseldorf. 62 pp.
