= The Child's Brain =

1914 painting by Giorgio de Chirico

- Il cervello del bambino (Italian)
- Artist: Giorgio de Chirico
- Year: 1914
- Medium: Oil on canvas
- Dimensions: 80 cm × 65 cm (31 in × 26 in)
- Location: Moderna Museet, Stockholm

The Child's Brain (Italian: Il cervello del bambino) is an oil-on-canvas painting by the Italian artist Giorgio de Chirico. It was completed in 1914 in Italy and is an example of the metaphysical art style. The painting measures 80 by 65 centimeters and is now housed at Moderna Museet, Stockholm. The subject of The Child's Brain is a nude young man, seen from the waist up, who is standing behind a table with his eyes closed.

== Description ==
The painting depicts a nude young man with a mix of both masculine and feminine features (the feminine being especially prominent in the lack of body hair or defined musculature, the long eyelashes and the finely groomed eyebrows) standing behind a table which blocks our view of him below the waist. On the table is a yellow book with a red bookmark, that has been interpreted as an allegorical representation of male/female intercourse. The man's right arm is hidden from view by a Greek column, connecting this painting to the art of the ancient Greeks, a common theme among de Chirico's work. The man himself is likely a younger version of the figure of Dionysos who appears in later works by de Chirico, such as The Phantom.

The common interpretation of the painting is that the figure represents de Chirico's father, with the book on the table representing the artists' parent's lovemaking, perhaps witnessed at some point by the young artist.

In The Child's Brain, the man depicted has his pelvic area covered by a book. This can be interpreted as the man being faced with the terror of castration which can be found in the psychological work of Sigmund Freud. De Chirico was in tune with Freud's studies, reflecting a fascination with psychosexual stages, particularly the phallic stage. It is at this time that the male child develops an obsession with his genitals, that leads to the realization of gender difference and a fear of castration.
