= Site selection =

Practice of new facility location

Site selection indicates the practice of new facility location, both for business and government. Site selection involves measuring the needs of a new project against the merits of potential locations. The practice came of age during the 20th century, as governments and corporate operations expanded to new geographies on a national and international scale and as detailed data regarding vehicular and pedestrian traffic patterns could be captured and analyzed.

== History ==
Site selection was formalized in the 1940s and 1950s through a number of important U.S. government projects. Determining the correct location for projects important to national security, including Los Alamos National Laboratory, the Hanford Site, and the United States Air Force Academy, required a thorough evaluation process. The site selection process developed for these projects was refined and later became standard practice in the private sector. As the U.S. economy and population expanded in the post-war years, so did corporate operations. Large companies began using a formal site selection process to identify ideal locations for new corporate campuses and, in particular, manufacturing operations.

Literature on site selection theory used to look until recent years at the various issues only from a national point of view. By and large, there are no international reviews to be found in these publications. In the US, a country in which industrial site selection played a role very early on, resulting in a very early search for methodical approaches, Edgar M. Hoover was one of the leading pioneers in the field of site analysis. In his book "The Location of Economic Activity", Hoover compiled crucial criteria of industrial site selection as early as 1948 that still apply today. There were, however, some quite early attempts to combine theories of international trade with nationally oriented site theories in order to develop a site theory with an international perspective. One of these early authors was Ohlin (1952), followed by Sabathil (1969), Moore (1978), Tesch (1980), and Goette (1994).

Nevertheless, even to this day, this situation has only changed to some extent. Even though since the 1990s it has no longer been only major corporations that expand abroad, and any foreign direct investment results in a site selection, there are still very few well-researched studies on this topic. A specifically international site selection theory is still not discernible. Many current and more recent publications either review site decisions made by individual corporations or analyze them as reference cases. Other publications focus on a cost-specific approach largely driven by site relocations in the context of cost structure optimization within major corporations. However, these publications only rarely and at best cursorily deal with issues of construction and real estate aspects.

Theodor Sabathil's 1969 dissertation is considered one of the early in-depth studies in the area of international site selection. Therein, Sabathil largely focused on country selection, which is part of the site selection process. In this context, Sabathil compiled a comprehensive catalogue of site factors and a theoretical approach to site selection; the latter does not go into great detail. Neither does Sabathil take any legal, natural, or cultural site factors into consideration. However, he discusses in particular company-specific framework conditions and psychological factors.

The dissertation submitted in 1980 by Peter Tesch constitutes another milestone in the further development of international site theory. Tesch combines theories of international trade and investment with site theories. He is the first to include country-specific framework conditions in his analysis. The main basis for his comments on the various types of internationalization are location-specific competitive advantages. In this context, Tesch developed a catalogue of criteria for international site decisions grouped into three categories: • site factors affecting all company activities • availability and costs of the site factors impacting on the production factors • turnover-related site factors.

Thomas Goette's 1994 study tries to classify important international site factors and to structure the process of international site selection. Goette distinguishes between economic site conditions (sales potential, competitive conditions, infrastructure and transportation costs, labor, monetary conditions), political site conditions (tax legislation, environmental protection, institutional market entry barriers, support of business, political risks), cultural site conditions (differences in language, mentality, religion, and the lack of acceptancy of foreign companies), and geographical site conditions (climate, topography). This study again demonstrates that an attempt to cover all aspects will result in loss of quality as all factors were not or could not be taken into consideration. Goette also theorizes that, in particular, industrial site decisions within companies are usually once-off and division-related decision-making processes. Based on this, Goette assumes a relatively low learning curve, and hence little potential for improvement for subsequent projects.

As one of the last major contributions, Thomas Glatte aimed to enhance and globalize the known systems in his book "International Production Site Selection" by providing a 10-staged selection process, suggesting selected methods for each selection stage and offering a comprehensive list of criteria for the practitioner.

== Notable projects ==
United States Air Force Academy

The United States Air Force was created in 1947 as an independent service branch and legislation was passed to create a United States Air Force Academy. Selecting the best location for the academy was deemed critical by Congress and the Air Force Academy Site Selection Board was established to manage the task. The board evaluated more than 580 locations in 22 states before selecting the current Colorado Springs site.

Hanford Site

Site selection for the Hanford nuclear production facility was important for different reasons. Nuclear material and nuclear weapon production required land suitable for large-scale manufacturing, but also remote and secure from natural disasters. The Army Corps of Engineers selected 586 acres in Southwest Washington in 1942.

BMW automotive manufacturing

In 1992, BMW announced the company would invest over $620 million to develop a new manufacturing facility in Spartanburg, South Carolina. The factory was the first by a European car manufacturer in the United States since Volkswagen had closed its Pennsylvania facility in 1992. BMW spent three years evaluating over 250 sites before selecting South Carolina.

== Process ==
The site selection process includes a detailed evaluation of project needs which are then measured against the merits of potential locations. The process typically includes selecting and evaluating communities, real estate site analysis and acquisition, and may include negotiating tax incentives. When choosing new locations for retail outlets, chain restaurant, and fast food franchises, site selection consultants will analyze the volume and travel patterns of cars and pedestrians as part of their process.

According to the U.S. General Services Administration, site selection considerations should begin early in the capital development process and play a significant role in pre-planning discussions. The process includes the following steps:

1. Define project criteria
2. Evaluate communities
3. Create short list of communities based upon project criteria
4. Identify real estate sites within each finalist community
5. Real estate analysis
6. Negotiate tax incentives
7. Site acquisition

Detailed site selection typically requires nine months for federal projects and four to six months for private sector projects. The National Environmental Policy Act may extend the site selection timeline for federal agencies, depending on the level of environmental analysis required.

== Current use ==
Formal site selection is widely employed today. The U.S. federal government and all federal agencies require new facility development to follow internal site selection procedures. While not as widespread, many state governments and state government agencies have followed suit and published their own site selection guides. Without requirements for use, site selection for private business is still widely used, but less so than in federal agencies. In private industry, site selection consultants are hired for complicated projects including manufacturing facilities, corporate headquarters, and research and development operations. For both government and business, the work can be performed by internal staff or an external advisors. Many large corporations with ongoing new facility needs employ internal site selection teams.

== See also ==
- Green building
- Healthy building
- Site survey
