= Kostio de War =

French actress and fashion designer (born 1896)

Lyska Kostio de Warkoffska (born April 20, 1896, in Baku, Russian Empire, now Azerbaijan; died March 13, 1986, in Boulogne-Billancourt, France), also known as Lyska Kostio and from 1935 onward as Kostio de War, was a French fashion designer. In 1935, she founded the fashion house Kostio de War in Paris, specialising in high quality knitwear and crochet wear.

== Life ==
Lyska Kostio de Warkoffska was the daughter of Serge de Warkoffska and Pétronille Geluyckens Around 1913, the »little Baroness« (French: la petite baronne), the »very pretty Russian« (French: fort jolie russe) or Mlle Lyska Kostio, as she was called until 1918, was introduced into the Parisian high society of the Belle Époque by the actress Louise Balthy. On February 4, 1914, she made her debut at the Théâtre Michel, which today is still located on the rue des Mathurins. In the revue La Sans-Gêne by Robert Dieudonné and René Bussy, she played the role of Lisoy alongside Louise Balthy. The show had more than 20 performances.

She had already attracted attention a year earlier by promenading in public using her "belly forward and the umbrella under the arm" style with Jacqueline Forzane, the future film actress, on the Deauville esplanade. Another eccentric appearance is documented in an issue of the New York daily The Sun, with a photo showing her with her doll collection, with which she regularly appeared in public. She was also known as the “Queen of Tango” She had the walls of her apartment on the Avenue du Bois demolished to create a large dance hall, decorated with painted panels by Léon Bakst. At the beginning of August 1914, when general mobilization was ordered, her dance hall was transformed into a hospice where she and her maidservant nursed casualties of the war. Her daughter Vanina was born on June 2, 1919. Around 1920 she began to use her full name Mme Lyska Kostio de Warkoffska. Five years later, on July 30, 1924, her engagement to Baron Jehan de Tinan Neyevelt was announced in the Parisian daily Le Figaro. But it was not until November 4, 1940, that she married in Cannes Christian Charles Raymond Aymar de Rivals-Mazères, a descendant of Jean Racine. The marriage did not produce any children.

In 1935, she adopted the final version of her name, Kostio de War, a combination of her middle forename and a shortening of her surname. It was under this name that she opened her first fashion store in at 18 rue Jean-Goujon in the 8th arrondissement of Paris. Her first collections consisted of hand-knitted and hand-crocheted knitwear, couture, sports, and fur articles. (French: Trickots, Couture, Sports, Fourrures). In 1938, the store moved to 108 rue Lauriston in the 16th arrondissement. In the same year, she left the Société de War. Her daughter Vanina began to attract attention by producing her own creations and took over the fashion store on the rue Jean-Goujon.

During the German occupation, she stayed on the French Riviera and on the Atlantic coast in Biarritz. She remained active and present on the fashion scene. With fashion houses like Worth, Heim and Henry La Pensée, she organized fashion shows such as in the Casino of Cannes. After the liberation of Paris at the end of August 1944, she returned to the capital, locating her fashion business on the 5th floor of a building at 14, rue Clément-Marot in the 8th arrondissement.

Her last fashion shop was located until her death on the Avenue Marceau, which connects the 8th arrondissement with the 16th.

Kostio de War died on March 13, 1986, at the age of 89 in the Hôpital Ambroise-Paré in Boulogne-Billancourt.

== Fashion career ==
Her collections retain a sober, classic style, but she combined unusual elements with her knitted and crochet items, something that distinguishes her designs from those of other couturiers. The material of her coats and suits is so finely knitted that it looks like woven fabric.

Comtesse de S. wrote that "Knitwear has long since been promoted into the ranks of the nobility, and its elegance only increases when it comes from the hand of Kostio de War." Lucien Lelong wrote that "Gold and blue embroidery (a pot of tulips) make both pockets remarkable by providing a very refined ornamental touch. Buttons of golden metal, scarf of gold thread... It's young, classical and very personal... These are qualities that are found in every costume made by Mme Kostio de War." Denise Veber described de War's gowns as "almost fairylike in appearance".

She fashioned tight-fitting evening gowns from gold or silver yarns. One of her evening gowns is today in the collection of the Victoria and Albert Museum in London. A similar piece made out of copper yarn can be found in the collections of the musée des Arts Décoratifs in Paris.

She also created suits, dinner jackets, hats, scarves and caps, sportswear (including clothes for cyclists), swimwear and gloves. At the beginning of 1937, Kostio de War found a small album of knitting samples dating from 1830 on which she based the designs of her own creations. Her designs and accessories were all knitted or crocheted by hand. They were showcased in various fashion magazines such as L'Officiel de la Mode, Elle, Marianne, Femina, Excelsior and Vogue. Her collections were photographed by photo studios such as Studio Franz, Juliette Lasserre's Studio, Studio Waroline and Studio Anzon. There are also images taken by Dora Maar, Jean Moral and Madame d'Ora; the latter took several portraits of the couturier herself.

Among Kostio de Wars' contemporaries who shaped Parisian fashion between 1930 and 1950 were designers such as Anny Blatt, Elsa Schiaparelli, Vera Borea, Lola Prusac, Jean Patou, as well as Coco Chanel, Jeanne Lanvin, Marcel Rochas and Jacques Heim. Among her clients and the wearers of her clothes were Gary Cooper, Greta Garbo, Yves Montand, Jean Marais, Louis Jouvet, Claude Dauphin, Annabella and Suzy Solidor.

In 2017, the Maison de War was reopened by Kostio de War's great-granddaughter, Sayana Gonzalez.

== Theater and film costumes ==
For the play Baignoir B ou Toute la vérité by Maurice Diamant Berger that premiered at the Théâtre de Marigny in spring 1939, Kostio de War designed the costumes for the actresses Simone Renant, Betty Daussmond, Jany Holt and Germaine Bréty.

Kostio de War designed the clothes, including a tight-fitting dark jacket with belt back, worn by the leading actor Marcel Dalio in Jean Renoir’s 1939 film La règle du jeu.

In 1952, as couturier, she provided the costumes for Alex Joffé's feature film Lettre ouverte that featured Robert Lamoureux and Geneviève Page.
