= Alan Clodd =

Irish publisher (1918-2002)

- Born: Harold Alexander Clodd; 22 May 1918; Dublin, Ireland
- Died: 24 December 2002 (aged 84); London, United Kingdom
- Occupations: Publisher; book collector; bookdealer
- Known for: Founder of Enitharmon Press
- Partner: George McLean (1956–1989)
- Relatives: Edward Clodd (grandfather)

Harold Alexander Clodd (1918–2002), known as Alan Clodd, was an Irish publisher, book collector, bookdealer and bibliophile, known for founding Enitharmon Press.

== Biography ==
Harold Alexander Clodd was born on 22 May 1918 in Dublin, Ireland to Harold Parker Clodd, a rubber broker, and Violet Mabel Clodd (née Alexander). Clodd's mother was born in Limerick to a family who ran a shop in Blackrock, Dublin. Clodd's father was born in London to English banker, writer and anthropologist Edward Clodd. Clodd had one older brother.

Prior to Clodd's birth, the Clodd family had lived in the Federated Malay States (present-day Malaysia) before returning to Ireland. In the 1920s the Clodd family moved to Ffestiniog before settling in Welwyn Garden City. Clodd was educated at Bishop's Stortford College.

== Career ==
Clodd first worked at the insurance firm Scottish Widows. During World War II he was a conscientious objector and worked with the Friends Ambulance Unit in Egypt and with UNRRA in Italy. He returned to London and first worked for an Oxford Street bookshop, then for five years at the London Library. This was followed by a series of clerical jobs and finally, a career in book publishing. Alan Clodd retired from publishing in 1987, and died in 2002 in London.

In the 1950s and early 1960s Clodd published poetry pamphlets by Christopher Logue, Ronald Firbank, and Kathleen Raine. In 1967 he founded the Enitharmon Press. The name came from a character (Enitharmon) by William Blake. The pressmark came from a William Blake woodcut. The Enitharmon Press revived interest in Frances Bellerby, Hugo Manning, and John Heath-Stubbs. Alongside the familiar names of Samuel Beckett, Jorge Luis Borges, Federico García Lorca, Harold Pinter, Kathleen Raine, and Vernon Watkins, the Press also introduced Frances Horovitz, Jeremy Hooker, Jeremy Reed, Richard Burns, David Gascoyne and Peter Russell. The Press had published nearly 150 titles, before being passed on to Stephen Stuart-Smith.

=== Collecting ===
During the 1950s Clodd began to collect books. His collection was strong in the Victorian and Edwardian authors who were contemporaries of his grandfather. He was also a collector of First World War poets: Edward Thomas, Ivor Gurney, Siegfried Sassoon, and David Jones, and other authors like Christopher Isherwood, W. H. Auden, Edward Upward, and Evelyn Waugh. He had almost every publication by T. S. Eliot and Ezra Pound, as well as books by James Joyce, Samuel Beckett, and Seamus Heaney. Many of the books were inscribed. His collection was catalogued and dispersed by the bookselling firm Maggs Bros Ltd of London.

== Personal life ==
Clodd was partners with George McLean from 1956 until McLean's death in 1989.

Clodd died on 24 December 2002 in London aged 84.
