= Enitharmon Press =

British publishing house

- Status: Active
- Founded: 1967; 59 years ago
- Founder: Alan Clodd
- Country of origin: United Kingdom
- Key people: Stephen Stuart-Smith, CEO; Isabel Brittain, Director
- Fiction genres: Poetry, literary translation, memoirs, fiction, literary criticism
- Official website: enitharmon.co.uk

Enitharmon Press is an independent British publishing house specialising in artists' books, poetry, limited editions and original prints.

The name of the press comes from the poetry of William Blake: Enitharmon was a character who represented spiritual beauty and poetic inspiration. The press's logo "derives from a Blake woodcut".

== Origins ==
The Press was founded by Alan Clodd in 1967. Sharing a belief with close friend Kathleen Raine in the "sacrificial stresses which seem to be the means by which the vision of outstanding creative spirits is enhanced for the benefit of their fellow beings", Clodd had little faith in the publishing mainstream. Since its founding, Enitharmon Press has been distinguished as an independent press whose two major concerns have been the quality of its books (from paper and binding to typesetting and design) and maintaining a "wide-ranging literary culture outside the realm of agents, public relations and television tie-ins".

Under Alan Clodd's stewardship, Enitharmon published more than 150 titles. Some of the most prestigious include books by Kathleen Raine, David Gascoyne, Vernon Watkins, Samuel Beckett and John Heath-Stubbs.

"William Blake dreamed up the original Enitharmon as one of his inspiriting, good, female daemons, and his own spirit as a poet-artist, printer-publisher still lives in the press which bears the name of his creation. Enitharmon is a rare and wonderful phenomenon, a press where books are shaped into artefacts of lovely handiwork as well as communicators of words and worlds. The writers and the artists published here over the last fifty years represent a truly historic gathering of individuals with an original vision and an original voice, but the energy is not retrospective: it is growing and new ideas enrich the list year by year. Like an ecologist who manages to restock the meadows with a nearly vanished species of wild flower or brings a rare pair of birds back to found a colony, this publisher has dedicatedly and brilliantly made a success of that sharply endangered species, the independent press."

— Marina Warner

In 1987, as he neared the age of 70, Clodd passed on the directorship of Enitharmon to Stephen Stuart-Smith. Alongside the poetry list, Stuart-Smith established Enitharmon Editions, now the leading British publisher of collaborations between distinguished artists and authors. Artists include Paula Rego, Gilbert & George, Henri Cartier-Bresson, Jim Dine, Robert Creeley, R. B. Kitaj and Victor Pasmore, and authors Ted Hughes, Thom Gunn, Seamus Heaney and Blake Morrison.

The list of Enitharmon Press, while still specialising in poetry, diversified to include translations, memoirs, fiction and literary criticism. Most notably, translations of Federico García Lorca, Vladimir Mayakovsky, Rainer Maria Rilke and Lao Zi and critical responses to the work of Edward Thomas and Edward Upward.

== Notable authors and publications ==
- U. A. Fanthorpe: Christmas Poems
- Geoffrey Hill: Clavics
- Federico García Lorca: Sonnets of Dark Love
- David Gascoyne: New Collected Poems
- Anthony Thwaite: Going Out
- Maureen Duffy: Pictures From an Exhibition
- Paul Muldoon: Songs and Sonnets
- Simon Armitage: Still
- Edward Upward: An Unmentionable Man
- Jeremy Reed: Voodoo Excess
- Sean Bonney: Letters Against the Firmament
- Edward Dorn: Derelict Air: From Collected Out

== Accolades ==
Writers published by Enitharmon have been recipients of these awards:

- Benson Medal (Royal Society of Literature)
- Booker Prize
- Costa Book Award
- E. M. Forster Award
- Forward Prize for Best Collection
- Forward Prize for Best First Collection
- Griffin Prize
- Nobel Prize for Literature
- Pulitzer Prize
- Queen's Gold Medal for Poetry
- Shakespeare Prize
- T. S. Eliot Prize
- Whitbread Poetry Award
- WH Smith Literary Award
