= Rødseth =

Rødseth is a surname. Notable people with the surname include:

- Asbjørn Rødseth (born 1951), Norwegian economist
- John Rødseth (born 1947), Norwegian sport shooter
- Tor Rødseth (1928–2007), Norwegian economist
