= David Gascoyne =

English Surrealist poet (1916–2001)

- David Gascoyne, by Patrick Swift, 1958
- Born: 10 October 1916; Harrow, London
- Died: 25 November 2001 (aged 85); Isle of Wight
- Education: Salisbury Cathedral School and Regent Street Polytechnic
- Occupation: Poet

David Gascoyne (10 October 1916 – 25 November 2001) was an English poet associated with the Surrealist movement, in particular the British Surrealist Group. Additionally, he translated work by French surrealist poets.

== Early life and surrealism ==
Gascoyne was born in Harrow, the eldest of three sons of Leslie Noel Gascoyne (1886–1969), a bank clerk, and his wife, Winifred Isobel, née Emery (1890–1972). His mother, a niece of the actors Cyril Maude and Winifred Emery, was one of two young women present when the dramatist W. S. Gilbert died in his lake at Grim's Dyke in May 1911. Gascoyne grew up in England and Scotland, attending Salisbury Cathedral School and London's Regent Street Polytechnic. He spent some of the early 1930s in Paris.

Gascoyne's first book, Roman Balcony and Other Poems, appeared in 1932, when he was 16. A novel, Opening Day was published the following year. However, it was Man's Life is This Meat (1936), collecting his early surrealism and translations of French surrealists, and Hölderlin's Madness (1938) that established his reputation. These, with his 1935 A Short Survey of Surrealism and his work on the 1936 London International Surrealist Exhibition, which he helped to organise, made him one of a small group of English surrealists that included Hugh Sykes Davies and Roger Roughton. At the exhibition, Gascoyne had to use a spanner to rescue Salvador Dalí from a deep-sea diving suit he had worn to give his lecture.

== Political outlook ==
Gascoyne was an active anti-fascist, who took part in several protests against the British Union of Fascists in London's East End. He joined the Communist Party of Great Britain in 1936 and travelled to Spain, where he broadcast some radio talks for the Barcelona-based propaganda ministry. However, he soon became disillusioned with the Communists' treatment of the POUM and the Spanish Anarchists and left the party. Gascoyne had become friends with Charles Madge and through him became involved in the Mass Observation movement.

The diaries Gascoyne kept for six years from 1936 projected an existentialist auto-criticism, recording with honesty his acute emotional and spiritual crises, his struggle to accept his sexual identity as a homosexual, and his affairs. Apart from his involvement with communism and Mass-Observation, he had friendships with Dylan Thomas, Kathleen Raine, Lawrence Durrell, Henry Miller and others. Also apparent is strong engagement with existentialist philosophy.

When later interviewed for the book Authors Take Sides on the Falklands, Gascoyne expressed strong opposition to the Falklands War.

== Later life and works ==
Gascoyne spent the years just before World War II in Paris, where he became friends with Salvador Dalí, Max Ernst, André Breton, Paul Éluard and Pierre Jean Jouve. His poetry of this period appeared in Poems 1937–1942 (1943) with illustrations by Graham Sutherland.

His poem Requiem, dedicated to the future victims of war, was written for his friend Priaulx Rainier to set to music. Her Requiem was first heard in 1956. She died on Gascoyne's 70th birthday, 10 October 1986.

Gascoygne returned to France after the war and lived there at intervals until the mid-1960s. His work from the 1950s appeared in A Vagrant and Other Poems (1950), and Night Thoughts (1956). These moved away from surrealism towards a more metaphysical and religious approach.

After suffering a mental breakdown, Gascoyne returned to England to spend the rest of his life on the Isle of Wight. He appears to have written little by then. Publication continued due to various "rediscoveries" of his works, with several collections and selections from Oxford University Press, Enitharmon and other imprints. Two books of his journals were returned to him after being lost for some time and were published in separate volumes by Alan Clodd at Enitharmon Press. When a third book was found, a collection including the additional material was edited by Lucien Jenkins for Skoob Books Publishing. For this Gascoyne himself provided what he called a "postface", one of the most extended pieces of writing from his later years.

In 1996, with the editorial assistance of Roger Scott, Gascoyne penned a tribute to his late friend of sixty years George Barker entitled The Fire of Vision, privately printed by Alan Anderson for Alan Clodd.

It was in Whitecroft Hospital on the Isle of Wight that Gascoyne met his wife, Judy Lewis, in a remarkable coincidence. Judy explains:

One of my favourite poems was called September Sun. I read it one afternoon and one of the patients came up to me afterwards and said "I wrote that." I put my hand on his shoulder and said "Of course you did, dear." Then of course when I got to know him I realised he had.

They married in 1975. David Gascoyne died on 25 November 2001 at the age of 85.

== Reputation ==
In a poetic field dominated by W. H. Auden and other more political and social poets, the surrealist group tended to be overlooked by critics and the public. He among others was lampooned by Dylan Thomas in Letter to my Aunt. Although Poems 1937–1942 (illustrated by Graham Sutherland and edited by Tambimuttu) received critical acclaim at the time, it was only with renewed interest in experimental writing associated with the British Poetry Revival that their work began to be discussed again. His Collected Poems appeared in 1988. Work of his was included in the Revival anthology Conductors of Chaos (1996).

In later years, Gascoyne seemed remarkably resigned to not altogether achieving in poetry what he had set out to do when young, and not sustaining a remarkable early promise. Still, he was pleased whenever he received critical notice. In his later years his attention was drawn to a balanced assessment of his work by Martin Seymour-Smith in his immense Guide to Modern World Literature (Macmillan), and he was gratified by the tone of the commentary and the assertion that he was still widely read. A tribute volume, For David Gascoyne On His Sixty-Fifth Birthday, appeared in 1981 with contributions from 26 poets, including Adrian Henri, Lawrence Durrell, and Michael Hamburger.

== Bibliography and criticism ==
- Robert Fraser, Night Thoughts: The Surreal Life of the Poet David Gascoyne, OUP, 2012. ISBN 978-0-19-955814-8
- Colin Benford, David Gascoyne A Bibliography Of His Works, Heritage Books, 1987. ISBN 978-0-9512220-0-3

== Selected works to 1984 ==
- Roman Balcony (Benford A1, 1932)
- Opening Day (Benford A2, 1933)
- A Short Survey of Surrealism (Benford A3, 1935)
- Man's Life is this Meat (Benford A4, 1936)
- Hoelderlin's Madness (Benford A5, 1938)
- Poems 1937–1942 (Benford A6, 1943)
- A Vagrant and Other Poems (Benford A7, 1950)
- Thomas Carlyle (Benford A8, 1952)
- Requiem (Benford A9, 1956)
- Night Thoughts (Benford A10, 1956)
- Collected Poems (Benford A11, 1965)
- Sun at Midnight (Benford A12, 1970)
- Three Poems (Benford A13, 1976)
- Paris Journal 1937–1939 (Benford A14, 1978)
- Journal 1936–1937 (Benford A15, 1980)
- Early Poems (Benford A16, 1980)
- Journal de Paris et d'Ailleurs 1936–1942 (Benford A17, 1984)
- Five Early Uncollected Poems (Benford A18, 1984)
- Recontres avec Benjamin Fondane (Benford A19, 1984)
