= Knut Heidar =

Norwegian political scientist

Knut Heidar (born 29 April 1949) is a Norwegian political scientist.

He was born in Moss. He has a PhD from London School of Economics, and was hired at the University of Oslo in 1975. He was promoted to associate professor in 1980 and professor in 1992. He was the dean of the Faculty of Social Sciences from 2007. Fanny Duckert took over on 1 January 2012.

Heidar edited the journal Scandinavian Political Research from to 1990 to 1993. His main field of research is political parties and party systems. He is a member of the Norwegian Academy of Science and Letters.

== Selected bibliography ==
- Norske politiske fakta 1884-1982: Universitetsforlaget 1983.
- Partidemokrati på prøve. Norske partieliter i demokratisk perspektiv: Universitetsforlaget 1988.
- with Einar Berntzen. Vesteuropeisk politikk. Partier Regjeringsmakt Styreform: Universitetsforlaget, editions 1993, 1995 and 1998.
- with Lars Svåsand (ed.): Partiene i en brytningstid (1994)
- with Lars Svåsand (ed.): Partier uten grenser? (1997)
- with Lars Svåsand: «Nordiske partiers samarbeidsmønstre - med hverandre og med Europa», i Johan P. Olsen og Bjørn Otto Sverdrup (ed.): Europa i Norden. Europeisering av nordisk samarbeid (1998)
- with Ruud Koole (ed.). Parliamentary Party Groups in European Democracies. Political parties behind closed doors: Routledge, London 2000.
- with Peter Esaiasson (ed.). Beyond Westminster and Congress. The Nordic Experience: Ohio State University Press 2000.
- «Norway», Elites on Trial: Westview Press 2001.
- with Jo Saglie. Hva skjer med partiene?: Gyldendal Akademisk 2002. Makt- og demokratiutredningen.
- (ed.), Nordic politics. Comparative approaches: Norwegian University Press, 2004.
- with Einar Berntzen and Elisabeth Bakke (ed.): Politikk i Europa: Partier, regjeringsmakt, styreform, Universitetsforlaget, 2008.

Academic offices
Preceded by Asbjørn Rødseth	Dean of the Faculty of Social Sciences, University of Oslo; 2007–2011	Succeeded by Fanny Duckert
