= Einar Berntzen =

Norwegian political scientist

Einar Berntzen (born 9 June 1955 in Misvær) is a Norwegian political scientist. He works as an associate professor at the Department of Comparative Politics at the University of Bergen. His research has been particularly focused on Latin America and Southern Europe.

== Selected bibliography ==
- with Knut Heidar and Elisabeth Bakke (ed.): Politikk i Europa: Partier, regjeringsmakt, styreform, Oslo: Universitetsforlaget, 2008
- with Marcus Buck and Leiv Marsteintredet: «La política comparada: a caballo entre historia y función», in Manual de sistemas políticos, Granada: Comares, 2007
- «El militarismo», in Sociedad y cultura en América Latina, Bergen: Vigmostad & Bjørke, 2006
- «Obstáculos para el desarrollo democrático», in Sociedad y cultura en América Latina, Bergen: Vigmostad & Bjørke, 2006
- «Demokratiske utfordringer i Latin-Amerika», in Latin-Amerikaårboka 2000. Maktens kanaler, Oslo: Solidaritet forlag, 2000
- with Knut Heidar: Vesteuropeisk politikk: Partier, regjeringsmakt, styreform, Oslo: Universitetsforlaget, editions 1993, 1995 and 1998
