= Operation Rubble =

British blockade running operation in World War II

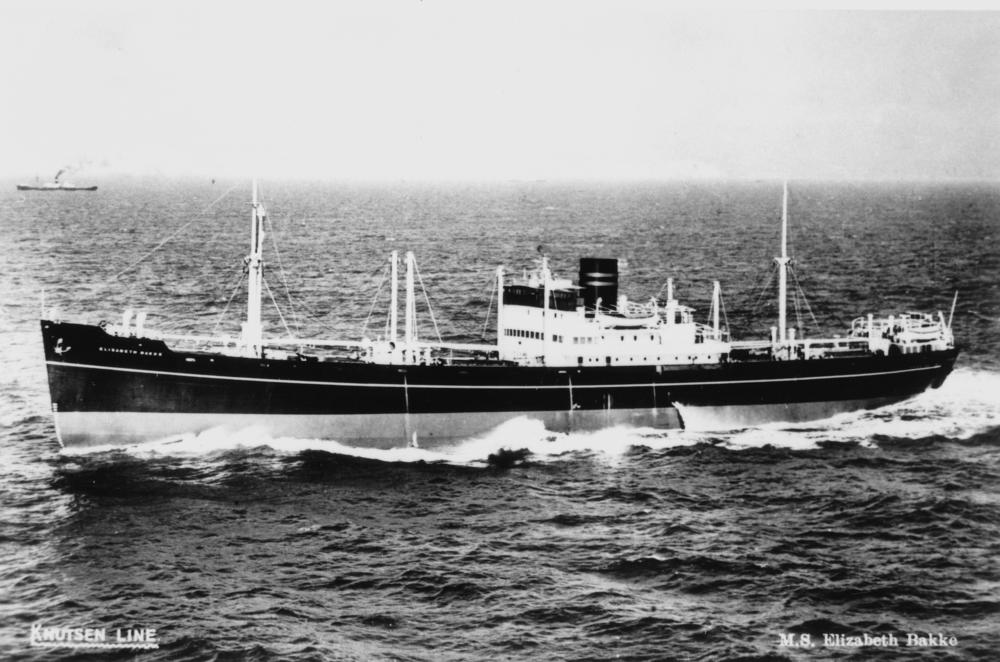
The Norwegian ship Elisabeth Bakke, one of the five ships which ran the blockade.

Operation Rubble in January 1941, was a British blockade running operation during the Second World War, in which five Norwegian merchant ships escaped from neutral Sweden to Britain through a Nazi German blockade of the Skagerrak, carrying valuable cargoes of specialised steel products.

== Background ==
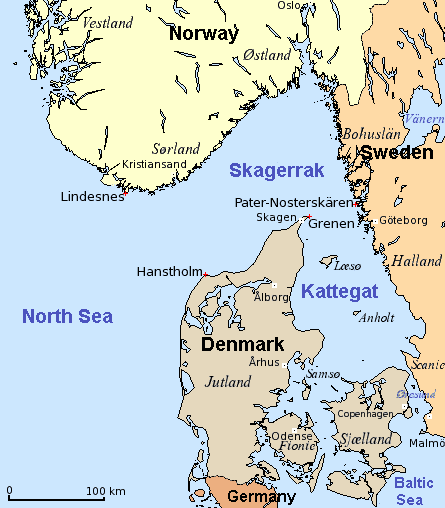
Map of the Skagerrak, showing the proximity of the Norwegian and Danish coasts which came under German control in 1940.

The German invasion of Denmark and Norway, Operation Weserübung, in April 1940, closed the Baltic Sea to shipping and denied the British access to Swedish iron and steel products. Even before the war, some 20 per cent of roller and ball bearings used by British industry were imported from Sweden, together with high-quality tubing and other specialised products that were not available elsewhere. The most desperately needed resource was roller bearings for a strip mill which was nearing completion at Ebbw Vale. An additional factor was that the United Kingdom had negotiated the Anglo-Swedish War Trade Agreement in October 1939, which limited Swedish exports to their 1938 levels, with a similar agreement having been reached with the Germans; the fear was that if exports to Britain were allowed to lapse, the Germans would be able to pressure the Swedes into renouncing both the agreements and monopolise production. A considerable quantity of British-ordered materials accumulated in Sweden, together with large orders made by France which had been signed over to Britain before their surrender. These supplies were desperately needed in Britain and the Swedish government was anxious to be rid of them to avoid antagonising the Germans.

The man tasked with shipping the steel to Britain was George Binney, the representative of the British Iron and Steel Federation in Sweden. His first efforts were a small shipment made by sea from the port of Petsamo (now Pechenga in Russia) on Finland's Arctic coast, followed by a second larger one which went by rail through Finland and across the USSR to the Caspian Sea and then through Iran to the Persian Gulf. After the Norwegian Campaign in June 1940, the Finns were pressured by the Germans into denying access. This left passage by sea through the Skagerrak, the narrows between occupied Denmark and Norway, as the only option.

== Preparation ==
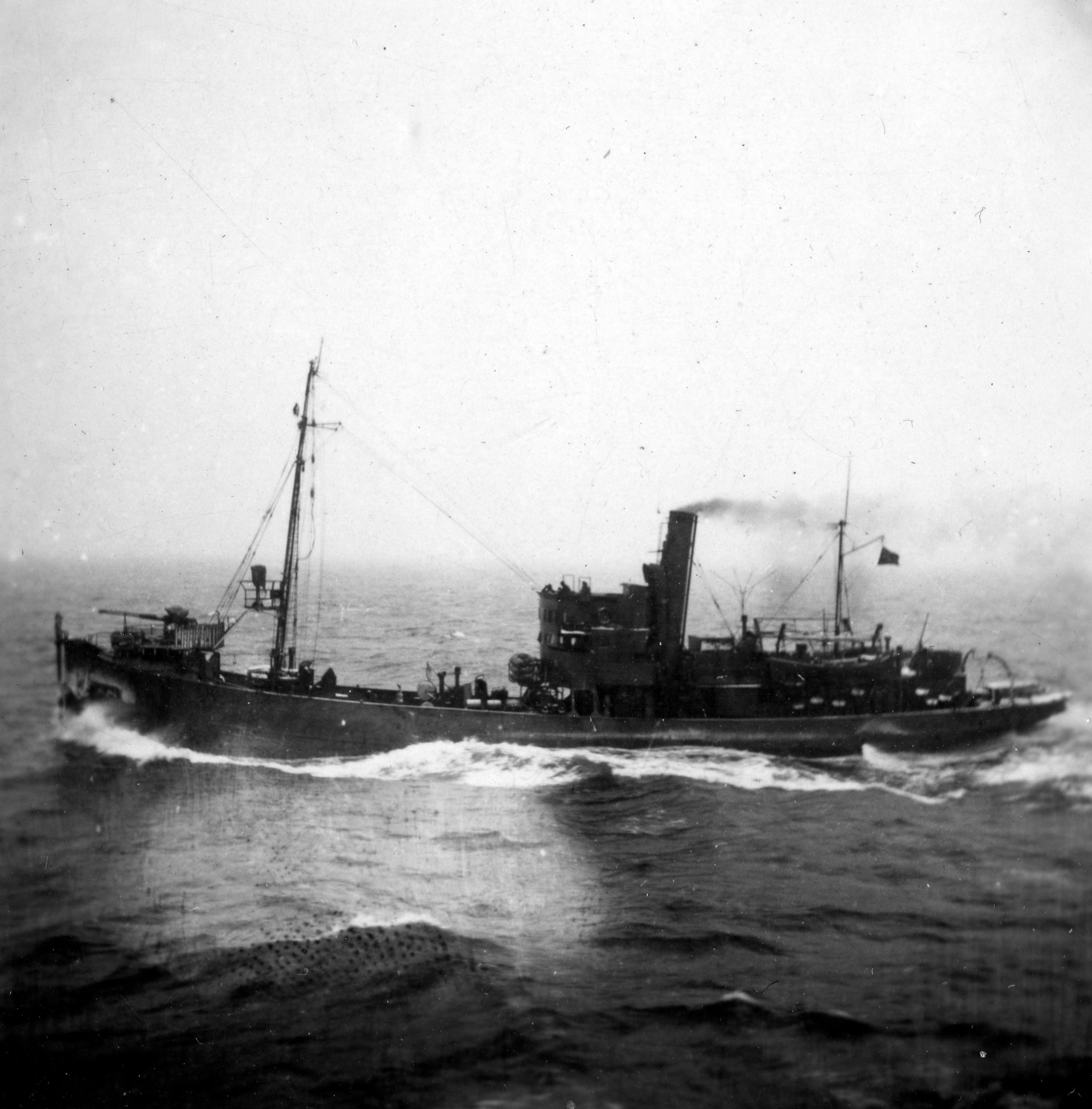
A German Vorpostenboot or armed trawler, typical of the patrol vessels used to enforce the Skagarrak blockade.

Laid-up in Swedish ports were more than twenty Norwegian merchant ships. Shortly before leaving the country, King Haakon VII of Norway approved legislation which requisitioned all Norwegian shipping under the control of a directorate called Nortraship based in London. Binney devised a plan in which these ships would be used to store British stockpiles and the most capable could be used for a break-out. The Germans were well aware of this possibility, the Skagerrak regularly patrolled by naval vessels and aircraft and an extensive minefield had been laid across the straight. Blinney suspected that the minefield was not as comprehensive as the Germans had claimed and with the encouragement of London, chartered a small Finnish tramp steamer, Lahti, to attempt the run. Departing Gothenburg on 5 July 1940 carrying 300 long tons (300 t) of steel products, Lahti traversed the Skagerrak but the short night allowed her to be spotted by German aircraft and her master obeyed their instruction to head for Kristiansand and internment, but the point had been proved.

Binney spent the following months selecting the fastest of the Norwegian ships, persuading their masters and crews to undertake the voyage and obtaining the necessary clearances from the Swedish authorities. Those Norwegians unwilling to take the risk were replaced by volunteers from the British Merchant and Royal Navy crews who had escaped from Norway and were held in an internment camp at Hälsingmo near Söderhamn in central Sweden.

== Escape ==
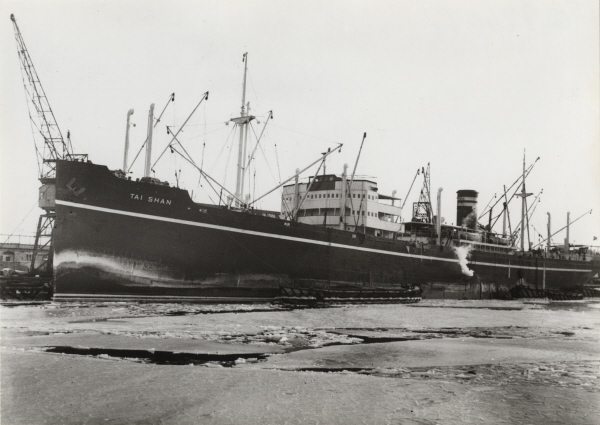
The Norwegian ship Tai Shan, which Binney used as his "flagship".

The ships involved were Norwegian steamships Elisabeth Bakke (5,450 GRT), John Bakke (4,718 GRT), Tai Shan (6,962 GRT), Taurus (4,767 GRT) and Ranja (6,355 GRT). The ships left Gothenburg singly on 30 December and anchored in Brofjorden, which was further north up the coast and away from German surveillance. Binney sailed in Tai Shan. There they awaited a weather forecast of poor visibility, which was finally received for the night of 23 January 1941, when they began their run of the German blockade. They narrowly avoided being intercepted by the two German battleships Scharnhorst and Gneisenau which were just starting Operation Berlin in the Kattegat.

The ships navigated the North Sea with aircraft from RAF Coastal Command and various warships being dispatched from Scapa Flow to act as escorts. These escorts included the cruisers HMS Naiad, Aurora, Edinburgh and Birmingham and the destroyers HMS Escapade, Echo and Electra. John Bakke and Ranja were being attacked by the Luftwaffe when the cruisers found them. The ships reached Kirkwall in Orkney on 25 January 1941. The Swedish mate of Ranja later died from bullet wounds. The ships delivered approximately 18,600 metric tons (18,300 long tons; 20,500 short tons) of materiel including ball bearings, machine tools, spare parts, iron, ingots, and steels of various qualities.

== Aftermath ==
As a result of "Rubble", Binney received a knighthood in the 1941 Birthday Honours List "for special services in the supply of war material".

=== Operation Performance ===
A second run, began on 31 March 1942, Operation Performance, involving six more Norwegian ships lacked surprise and optimal weather conditions, two ships were forced to return to Sweden, two were sunk and two reached Britain, carrying 27 per cent of the original cargo.

=== Operations Bridford and Moonshine ===
A change of tactics for Operation Bridford saw the use of converted motor gunboats, which made six return trips between October 1943 and March 1944 carrying some 25,000 metric tons (25,000 long tons; 28,000 short tons) of cargo. The same tactics were employed for Operation Moonshine starting in September 1944 which was largely frustrated by poor weather and mechanical defects; a single mission in January 1945 reached Sweden, although two of the three boats involved collided, resulting in the loss of one of them.

== Other sources ==
- UK National Archive: FO 371/29410 1941, Operation "Rubble" - FO 371/29425, 1941, Operations "Rubble" and "Performance": Includes "Discussions with the Swedes (including Swedish financier and wartime diplomat Marcus Wallenberg) about moving Norwegian ships from Gothenburg in the face of German opposition."
- warsailors.com:M/T Elisabeth Bakke (Accessed July 2011)
