= Lars Svåsand =

Lars Svåsand (born 21 July 1947 in Bergen) is a Norwegian political scientist. He is professor at the Department of Comparative Politics at the University of Bergen and affiliated with the Chr. Michelsen Institute on a part-time basis. His research has focused on political parties, elections and democratisation processes.

== Bibliography ==
- with Sabiti Makara and Lise Rakner: «Turnaround: The National Resistance Movement and the Reintroduction of a Multiparty System in Uganda», in Lise Rakner, Julius Kiiza og Sabiti Makara (ed.): Electoral Democracy in Uganda. Understanding Institutional Processes and Outcomes of the 2006 Multiparty Elections, Kampala: Fountain Publishers, (2008)
- Lars Svåsand and Nandini Patel (ed.): Government and Politics of Malawi, (2007)
- Lars Svåsand, Lise Rakner and Nixon S. Khembo: «Fissions and fusions, foes and friends: Party system restructuring in Malawi in the 2004 general election», Comparative Political Studies, bd. 40, no. 9, 2007, p. 1112–1137
- Marie Demker and Lars Svåsand (ed.): Partiernas århundrade: fempartimodellens uppgång och fall i Norge och Sverige (2005)
- Lise Rakner and Lars Svåsand: «Stuck in Transition: Electoral Processes in Zambia 1991-2001» Democratization (2005)
- Lars Svåsand and Lise Rakner: «From dominant to competitive party system: The Zambian experience 1991-2001», Party Politics (2004)
- Lars Svåsand and Lise Rakner: «The quality of electoral processes: Zambian election 1991-2001», African Social Research (2003)
- Lars Svåsand and Vicky Randall: «Political parties and democratic consolidation in Africa», Democratization (2002)
- Lars Svåsand: «The re-emergence of the EU issue in Norwegian politics», Scandinavian Review (2002)
- Lars Svåsand and Vicky Randall: «Party Institutionalization and the New Democracies», i Jeff Haynes (ed.): Democracy and political change in the Third World (2001)
- Lars Svåsand: «Statlig finansiering av politiske partier: intensjonene og utfallet» NOU: 03/2001: Velgere, valgordning, valgte. Valglovutvalgets innstilling (2001)
- Lars Svåsand, John Pierre and Anders Widfelt: «State Subsidies and political parties: Confronting rhetoric with reality», West European Politics (2000)
- Daniel Apollon, Odd-Bjørn Fure and Lars Svåsand: Approaching a new millenium : lessons from the past - prospects for the future (2000)
- Lars Svåsand and Knut Heidar: «Nordiske partiers samarbeidsmønstre - med hverandre og med Europa», in Johan P. Olsen og Bjørn Otto Sverdrup (ed.): Europa i Norden. Europeisering av nordisk samarbeid (1998)
- Lars Svåsand: «Scandinavian right-wing radicalism» in H. G. Betz og S. Immerfall (ed). The New Politics of the Right. Neo-Populist Parties and Movements in Established Democracies (1998)
- Lars Svåsand: «The Center-Right Parties in Norwegian Politics» in Frank W. Wilson (ed): The European Center-Right at the End of the Twentieth Century (1998)
- Knut Heidar and Lars Svåsand (ed.): Partier uten grenser? (1997)
- Lars Svåsand and Kaare Strøm (ed.): Challenges to Political Parties: the Case of Norway (1996)
- Knut Heidar and Lars Svåsand (ed.): Partiene i en brytningstid (1994)
- Göran Djupsund and Lars Svåsand (ed.): Partiorganisationer : studier i strukturer og processer i finske, norske og svenske partier (1990)
