= Billy Dudley =

Billy Joseph Stanley Oritsesaninomi Dudley (10 November 1931 – 23 December 1980) was a leading Nigerian political scientist, working mostly at the University of Ibadan (UI), which he joined in 1959. Until late 1962, he was on the staff of the Extra Mural Department of UI, and from 1960 to 1962 he was based in Zaria, where he began the research that he later supplemented with research in London, England, during periods of leave in 1961, 1963, and 1965, each lasting several months. His resulting PhD was published in 1968 as Parties and Politics in Northern Nigeria. He became a Professor at UI in 1971 and Head of department in 1972.

== Early life ==
Dudley was born at Warri, Nigeria, to Diana Alice Oritseweyinmi Chute. His father was Stanley John Dudley. His early childhood was spent in Warri, in the care of his maternal grandmother.

== Education ==
He started school in Warri in 1939. In 1943, his grandmother took him to live with his mother and stepfather, who at that time were in Ilesha. He completed the last year of his primary education at Iloro School, Ilesha, then became a boarder at Ilesha Grammar School.

After leaving that school in 1949, he returned to the Warri/Sapele area, employed first in palm produce inspection, then for a short while teaching at Zik's College of Commerce. During this time, he used a correspondence course ("Rapid Results") to study further, initially hoping to obtain a degree in economics in this manner.

In 1955 he became a student at the University College of Leicester on a government scholarship, becoming "one of a small group of Nigerian students, later to become distinguished academics, who passed through Leicester in the late 1950s and gained a reputation there for outstanding performance (others included J. F. Ade Ajayi and Adebayo Adedeji)."

== Career ==
Before his final illness, Dudley had started to gather material for a biography of Murtala Mohammed, the Nigerian military president who took over from General Yakubu Gowon after the 1976 coup, and who was assassinated later that year. Dudley's published views on Mohammed indicated that he held Mohammed in high regard. Dudley died in Epping, England.

Billy Dudley was one of the co-authors of the 1979 Constitution of Nigeria (since replaced, following various military coups). He is also credited with having been a major influence on the principal advisers to General Gowon in 1967, recommending that Nigeria should stay as one unitary state following the threatened secession of Biafra.

== Personal life ==
He is survived by his wife, two daughters, two sons and six grandchildren.

== Posthumous Celebration ==
In 1996 a symposium was held at the University of Ibadan to discuss aspects of political science that were regarded as having been influenced by Billy Dudley's writings.

On Wednesday, 27 October 2010, the University of Ibadan hosted a ceremony at the Department of Political Science for the unveiling of a memorial plaque remembering Professor Billy Dudley.

== Books published ==
Of his three books, Parties and Politics in Northern Nigeria was an analysis of the political structures of Northern Nigeria, when the whole of northern Nigeria was a single state - as of 2007, it has been divided into around 19 states, changing the political allegiances.

Instability and Political Order: Politics and Crisis in Nigeria was written in 1969–70. It is still of interest for its views on the Nigerian military and the Nigerian Civil War. This book made use of game theory and introduced the use of game theory as an analytical approach in subsequent political science analysis of Nigeria.

An Introduction to Nigerian Government and Politics was written in 1979–80, and includes an analysis of the 1979 elections. Although Nigeria has since been through several military and civilian governments, and the constitution has changed, the underlying social and political culture has changed less, keeping the book in demand. Dudley had intended to write an additional chapter to this book, discussing selected political events in Nigeria in the context of internalized values, but he became too ill to do so.

== Publications ==
=== Books ===
- (edited, with O. Aboyade and J O'Connell), Nigeria 1965 – Crisis and Criticism (Ibadan University Press, 1966) (collection of articles from Nigerian Opinion magazine)
- Dudley, B.J., 2013. 2nd ed.Parties and politics in Northern Nigeria. Routledge.
- Dudley, B.J., 1973. Instability and political order: Politics and crisis in Nigeria. Ibadan University Press.
- Dudley, B.J., 1982. An introduction to Nigerian government and politics. Bloomington: Indiana University Press.

=== Peer-reviewed articles ===
- Dudley, B.J., 1966. Federalism and the balance of political power in Nigeria. Journal of Commonwealth & Comparative Politics, 4(1), pp. 16–29. doi: 10.1080/14662046608447031
- Dudley, B.J., 1981. The Nigerian elections of 1979: The voting decision. Journal of Commonwealth & Comparative Politics, 19(3), pp. 276–298. doi: 10.1080/14662048108447389
- Dudley, B.J., 1971. The military and development. The Nigerian Journal of Economic and Social Studies, 13(2), pp. 161–177.
- Dudley, B.J., 1963. The nomination of parliamentary candidates in Northern Nigeria: An analysis of political change. Journal of Commonwealth & Comparative Politics, 2(1), pp. 45–58. doi: 10.1080/14662046308446988
- Dudley, B.J., 1968. Nigeria's civil war: The tragedy of the Ibo people. The Round Table, 58(229), pp. 28–34. doi: 10.1080/00358536808452718
- Dudley, B.J., 1967. Nigeria goes it alone: The drift towards open conflict. The Round Table, 57(227), pp. 319–324. doi: 10.1080/00358536708452689
