= Charles Madge =

English poet, journalist, and sociologist

Charles Henry Madge (10 October 1912 – 17 January 1996) was an English poet, journalist and sociologist, now most remembered as a founder of Mass-Observation.

== Life ==
Charles Henry Madge was born in Johannesburg, South Africa, son of Lieut-Col. Charles Madge (1874–1916) and Barbara Hylton-Foster (1882–1967). He was educated at Winchester College and studied at Magdalene College, Cambridge. He was a literary figure from his early twenties, becoming a friend of David Gascoyne; like Gascoyne he was generally classed as a surrealist poet. Madge's essay "Surrealism for the English" (New Verse magazine, December 1933) argued that potential English surrealist poets would need both a knowledge of "the philosophical position of the French surrealists" and "a knowledge of their own language and literature". Madge contributed the essay "Pens Dipped In Poison" (1934) to Left Review, a strong critique of the British intellectuals who had supported the First World War. He worked for a spell as a reporter for the Daily Mirror. By the end of the 1930s, he was more involved in the Mass-Observation social research movement, which he co-founded in 1937, socialist realism (in theory) and Communism. By the 1940s, however, Madge was moving away from Communism.

In 1947 he became the Social Development Officer for Stevenage New Town, and in 1950 (despite never having completed a university degree) he was appointed as the first Professor of Sociology at the University of Birmingham, a position he held until 1970.

Faber and Faber published his poetry as The Disappearing Castle (1937) and The Father Found (1941).

== Family ==
In 1938, Charles Madge married the poet Kathleen Raine (previously married to Hugh Sykes Davies). He had two children by Kathleen Raine: Anna Madge (b. 1934) and James Wolf Madge (1936–2006) who married Jennifer Alliston, daughter of architects Jane Drew and James Thomas Alliston. In 1942 he married Inez Pearn, a young novelist who published under the name of Elizabeth Lake. She had previously been married to Stephen Spender. They had two children: a daughter and a son. Inez died in 1976. Charles married his third wife, Evelyn Brown, in 1979.

== Books ==
POETRY

- The Disappearing Castle. Charles Madge. Faber & Faber, London, 1937.
- The Father Found. Charles Madge. Faber & Faber, London, 1941.
- Of Love, Time and Places: Selected Poems. Charles Madge. Anvil Press, London, 1994.

SOCIOLOGY

- Mass Observation Number One. Charles Madge & Tom Harrisson. Frederick Muller, London, 1937.
- May the Twelfth: Mass Observation Day – surveys 1937 by over two hundred observers. Charles Madge & Humphrey Jennings (editors). Faber & Faber, London, 1937.
- First Year’s Work, 1937-1938, by Mass Observation. Charles Madge and Tom Harrisson. Lindsay Drummond, London, 1938.
- Britain, by Mass-Observation. Charles Madge and Tom Harrisson. Penguin Books, London, 1939.
- War Begins at Home, by Mass Observation. Charles Madge and Tom Harrisson (editors). Chatto & Windus, London, 1940.
- The propensity to save in Blackburn and Bristol. Charles Madge. National Institute of Economic and Social Research, London, 1940.
- Industry after the War: Who is going to run it?. Charles Madge in consultation with Donald Tyerman. Foreword by William Beveridge. Pilot Press, London, 1943.
- Pilot Guide to the General Election. Charles Madge (editor). Pilot Press, London, 1945.
- To Start You Talking. An experiment in Broadcasting. Charles Madge, A.W. Coysh & George Dixon, and a commentary on the reactions of listening groups by Inez Madge. Pilot Press, London, 1945.
- Society in the Mind: Elements of Social Eidos. Charles Madge, The Free Press, New York, 1964.
