= George Binney =

English arctic explorer (1900–1972)

Binney in 1947.

Sir Frederick George Binney, DSO (23 September 1900, Epsom, Surrey–1972 Jersey) was a noted Arctic explorer. During the Second World War, he led blockade-running missions, including Operation Rubble, to procure supplies of Swedish ball bearings and other steel products for British armament production, for which he was knighted and made a Royal Naval Volunteer Reserve commander.

== Early life ==
Frederick George Binney was born at on 23 September 1900 in the village of Great Bookham, Surrey. His father, Reverend Maximilian Frederick Breffit Binney, was the Anglican vicar of St Nicholas Church, Sutton in Lancashire (now Merseyside), but moved to St Mary Magdalene, Richmond, Surrey, in October 1900. Shortly after the move, baby George's mother Emily (née Blinkhorn) died from pneumonia. Along with his older brothers, Binney attended Summerfields School in Oxford before winning a King's Scholarship at Eton College. From there, he gained a scholarship to Merton College, Oxford, where in his second term, he became editor of The Isis Magazine.

== Arctic exploration ==
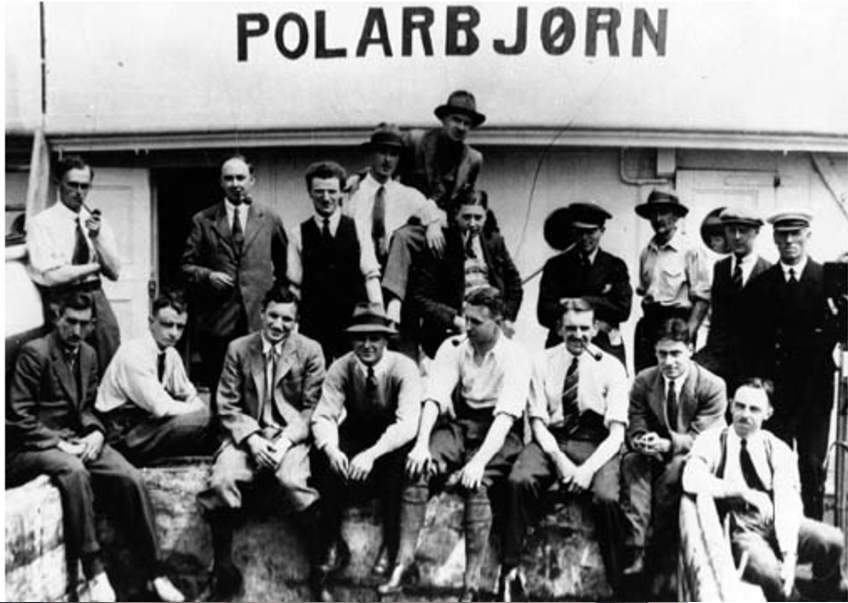
The 1924 Oxford University Arctic Expedition on the largest of their ships, the Polar Bjørn. Binney is in the top row, fifth from the left.

Whilst still an undergraduate at Merton College, Oxford, Binney was recruited by Julian Huxley as organizing secretary to the 1921 Oxford University Spitsbergen expedition, subsequently leading both the 1923 Merton College Arctic Expedition, and the 1924 Oxford University Arctic Expedition. He was a pioneer in the use of seaplanes for Arctic survey work and wrote up this experience in his 1925 book With Seaplane and Sledge in the Arctic. On its second flight with Binney as observer, the seaplane's engine failed; he and the pilot were lucky to be rescued from the ice-floes by Norwegian meteorologists. The expedition was the first to traverse Nordaustlandet or North East Land, the second-largest island in the Svalbard archipelago. The Avro 504O seaplane ("The Avro Arctic") used was supplied by A. V. Roe and Co., Ltd. and its 180-h.p. Lynx air-cooled engine provided by Armstrong Siddeley.

He later advised the 1931 expedition of Hans Wilhelmsson Ahlmann to Nordaustlandet and was home secretary to Sandy Glen's 1935 expedition to the same region. He served on the council of the Royal Geographical Society from 1934 to 1953.

== Early career ==
Subsequent to these expeditions he worked in the Arctic for the Hudson's Bay Company from 1926 to 1930. During this time he wrote The Eskimo Book of Knowledge (published by the Hudson's Bay Company), a book explaining a rather colonial view of the wider world to the Inuit. During a company restructuring in 1931, Binney's role in the field was terminated, but he declined the offer of an office job in Winnipeg and returned to London. There he was recruited to establish a Central Export Department for United Steel Companies and he trained for nine months at the firm's steel works in Sheffield, Scunthorpe and Workington. He also completed a course at the Dundee School of Economics in 1932. Binney subsequently succeeded in establishing company representation in South America and Asia and made personal visits to Iran and China in the pre-war years.

== Sweden ==
In December 1939, Binney took up a post as the representative in Sweden of the Iron and Steel Control department of the British Ministry of Supply. He was to assist in the acquisition of steel, machine tools, and most notably roller and ball-bearings for the United Kingdom's armament programme. He had also been briefed by MI6 to report anything which might be of interest.

Following the German invasions of Norway and Denmark in April 1940, navigation of the Skagerrak was closed to Allied shipping by a German blockade. Binney attempted to circumvent this by sending material through Finland, but after the first two shipments, the Germans pressurised the Finns into stopping any further transits, leaving the Skagerrak as the only option.

Binney set about organising a series of blockade-running operations. The first in January 1941, Operation Rubble, used five Norwegian merchant ships that had been laid-up in Sweden, loaded with specialised steel products. Under cover of poor weather and the long hours of winter darkness, all the ships were able to evade German patrols and reach Britain. A second operation launched in March 1942, Operation Performance, involved six more Norwegian ships but was less fortunate; lacking surprise and optimal weather conditions, two ships were forced to return to Sweden, two were sunk and only two reached Britain, carrying 27% of the original cargo.

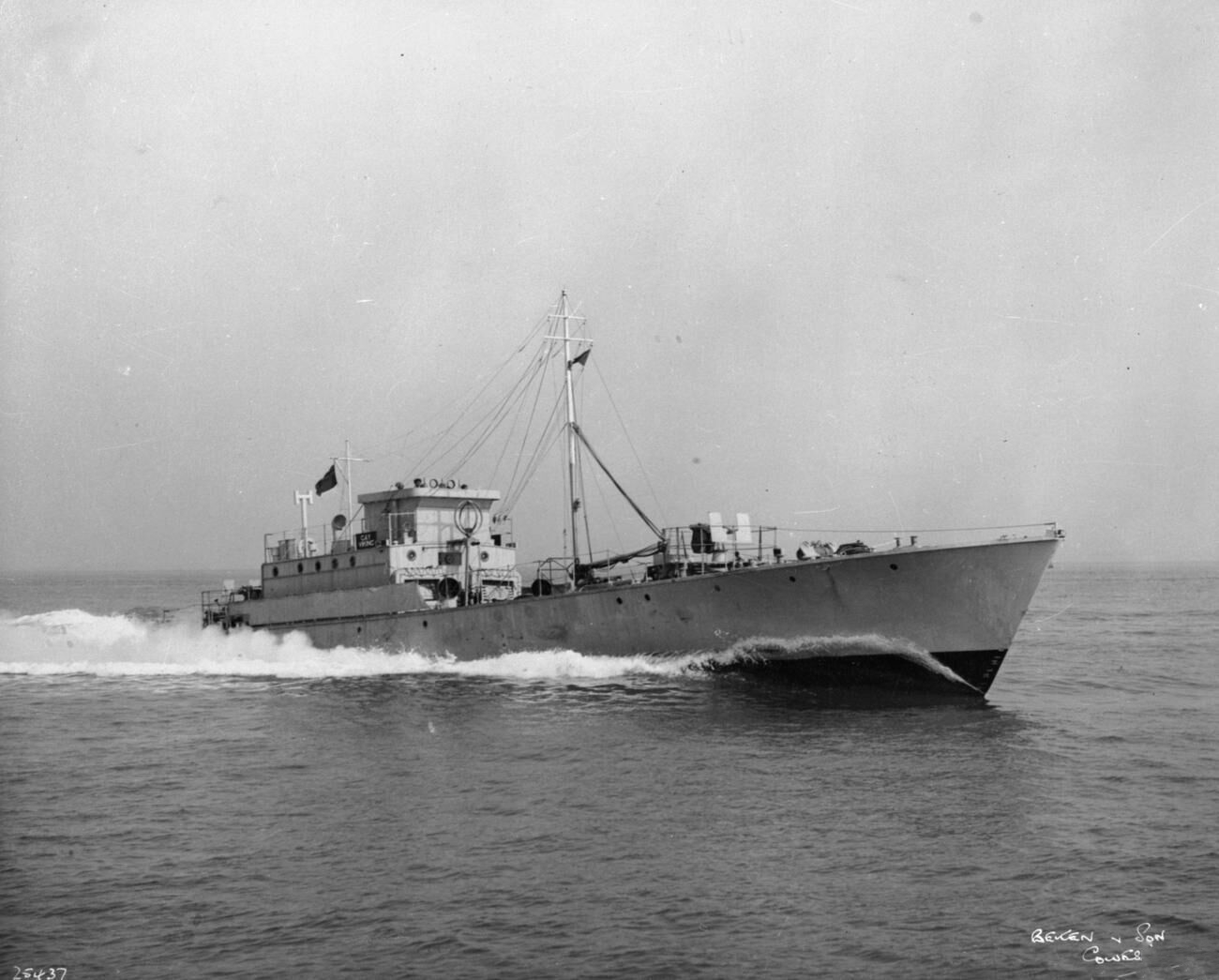
MV Gay Viking, one of the converted motor gunboats used in Operation Bridford.

Although Performance had been considered successful, it was decided not to risk another attempt with large merchant ships. Operation Bridford used converted motor gunboats, which made six return trips between October 1943 and March 1944 carrying some 25,000 tonnes of cargo. Operation Moonshine using the same boats started in September 1944, but was repeatedly delayed by poor weather and mechanical defects; a single mission in January 1945 reached Sweden, although two of the three boats involved collided, resulting in the loss of one of them.

Binney had personally led these missions, returning to Sweden by air, on one occasion strapped into the bomb bay of a de Havilland Mosquito bomber. For the Operation Bridford runs, he was given the substantive rank of Commander in the Royal Naval Volunteer Reserve to give him the legal status of commodore of the flotilla in case he were captured. However, at the end of the final Bridford mission, Binney suffered a heart attack and this prevented his participation in Operation Moonshine. Following the war, Binney made a full recovery, but he was forbidden from publishing an account of the Swedish blockade-running on the grounds of secrecy, and his name was not mentioned in connection with the operations when the official history, The War at Sea was published in 1956, although this was rectified in later editions. Nevertheless, an outline of the Swedish operations was released to the press in 1945, who dubbed Binney "the Secret Knight".

== Later career ==
After the war, Binney resumed his post at United Steel, where he negotiated major contracts with Iran for the supply of steel rails. He was Vice-President of the Geographical Society again from 1953 to 1957 and was a trustee from 1958 to 1959.

== Honours ==
For his work in the Arctic, Binney was awarded the Back Award of the Royal Geographical Society (RGS) in 1927, and the Médaille d'Or de la Roquette of the Société de Géographie. In 1957 he was awarded the Founder's Medal of the RGS.

Binney received a knighthood in the 1941 Birthday Honours List "for special services in the supply of war material". and awarded a Distinguished Service Order in 1944 "for outstanding leadership and skill". He was awarded the Patron's Medal of the Royal Geographical Society in 1957 ("For contributions to Arctic exploration ... the pioneer use of the air survey technique … and to the development of the university exploring expedition").

== Private life ==
Binney acquired Horham Hall, Essex as his residence, later living in Jersey, where he died. He was married twice, in 1946 to Evelyn Mary Fane (they divorced in 1954), and in 1955 to Sonia Simms.

== Selected publications ==
- Binney, George (1925) With Seaplane and Sledge in the Arctic - The account of the 1924 Oxford Arctic Expedition, London, Hutchinson & Co
- Binney, George (1929) Hudson Bay in 1928. Geographical Journal, Vol 74, No 1, pp. 1–27
- Binney, George (1931) The Eskimo Book of Knowledge, London, Hudson's Bay Co. (Note: The book is mentioned in Helen DeWitt's novel The Last Samurai.(p 242))
