= MT Ranja =

Norwegian motor tanker (1928–1942)

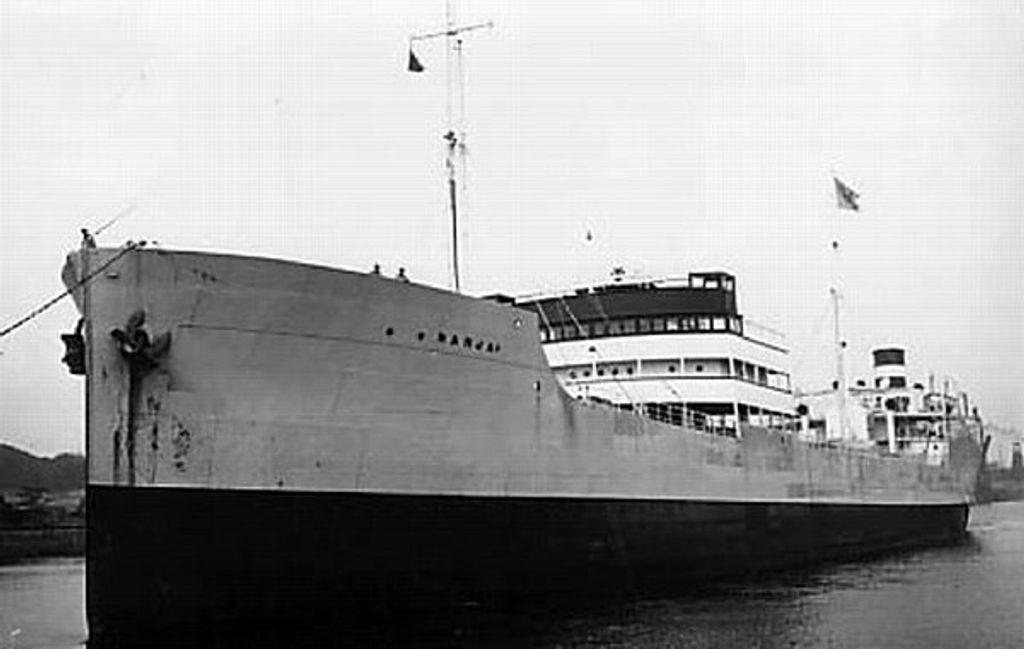
- MT Ranja in 1928

History

Norway
- Name: Ranja
- Owner: Rederi A/S Ruth
- Operator: Hagbart Waage
- Port of registry: Oslo, Norway
- Yard number: 408
- Completed: April 1928
- Identification: Call sign: LCFP
- Fate: Sunk on 17 March 1942

General characteristics
- Type: Motor tanker
- Tonnage: 6,355 GRT; 3,753 NRT; 9,520 DWT
- Length: 408.3 ft (124.4 m)
- Beam: 55.3 ft (16.9 m)
- Depth: 32.0 ft (9.8 m)
- Installed power: 2 × diesel engines w/ 6 cylinders
- Speed: 11 knots (20 km/h; 13 mph)
- Crew: 34

MT Ranja was a Norwegian motor tanker that was operated by a shipping company of the same nationality, Hagbart Waage, between 1928 and 1942. She participated in Operation Rubble, a British plan to break Norwegian merchant ships out of Sweden. The tanker was torpedoed and sunk by the German submarine U-71 450 miles (720 km) south of Philadelphia, Pennsylvania, on 17 March 1942.

== Construction ==
Ranja was built by A/B Götaverken, a Swedish shipbuilding company, in Gothenburg, Sweden. She was delivered in April 1928 and owned by the firm Rederi A/S Ruth, which gave operations of the tanker to the company Hagbart Waage. Her call sign was LCFB. Her yard number was 408, and she was registered in Oslo.

=== Specifications ===
Ranja was 408.3 feet (124.4 m) long, 55.3 feet (16.9 m) wide, and had a depth of 32.0 feet (9.8 m). She was assessed at 6,355 gross register tons, 3,753 net register tons, and 9,520 deadweight tons. She had two diesel engines, each with six cylinders with a diameter of 550 millimetres (22 in). The tanker had a top speed of 11 knots (20 km/h; 13 mph).

== Service ==
In late January 1941, Ranja was one of five Norwegian ships that fled Gothenburg as part of Operation Rubble, escaping while escorted by Royal Navy vessels to Kirkwall, Scotland. She was attacked by German aircraft one day after leaving the port, wounding the first mate who would die upon the tanker's arrival in Kirkwall and was posthumously awarded the Order of the British Empire. Ranja had carried a crew that consisted of sailors whose ships had been lost during the 1940 Battle of Narvik.

Ranja sailed in fifteen total convoys between March 1941 and January 1942, visiting Curaçao, Bermuda, New York, Providence, and Halifax. The tanker delivered much-needed petroleum to the United Kingdom to fuel the country's war effort.

== Sinking ==
Ranja departed from Houston, Texas, on 9 March 1942. She carried a full load of oil and was crewed by 34 men. The tanker was bound for Halifax, and was planned to join a convoy in the Canadian port and subsequently sail to the United Kingdom. Included in her crew were two British men, along with a soldier from the British Army, that manned Ranja's gun.

On 17 March, 450 miles (720 km) south of Philadelphia and near Diamond Shoals at 19:42, U-71—commanded by Kapitänleutnant Walter Flaschenburg—fired two torpedoes at Ranja from a distance of 1,400 metres (1,500 yd) and at a depth of 2.5 metres (8.2 ft). The first struck below the tanker's bridge and the second just forward of her funnel. This caused a large explosion and a column of flame, with the crew of U-71 reporting it shot as high as 400 metres (1,300 ft) into the air. Ranja listed to port as her speed slowed, and U-71 fired a third torpedo as a coup de grâce at 19:54. This torpedo reportedly skipped over the surface of the water, porpoising, from a distance of 800 metres (870 yd). It struck at the forward mast between the bow and bridge, causing yet another explosion.

Ranja stopped in her tracks as the fire spread from her bow to her stern. The tanker's forecastle appeared to break off as the bow was submerged, collapsing the forward mast and bridge. Not spying any lifeboats or crewmen, U-71 departed the scene around 20:00 hours and headed towards Cape Hatteras. All 34 crewmen aboard Ranja were lost. Her merchant seamen are memorialized at the Stavern Memorial in the United Kingdom, and her two British gunners are listed on the Chatham Naval Memorial in Kent.

== See also ==
- MS Elisabeth Bakke
