= Edward Clodd =

English writer and anthropologist

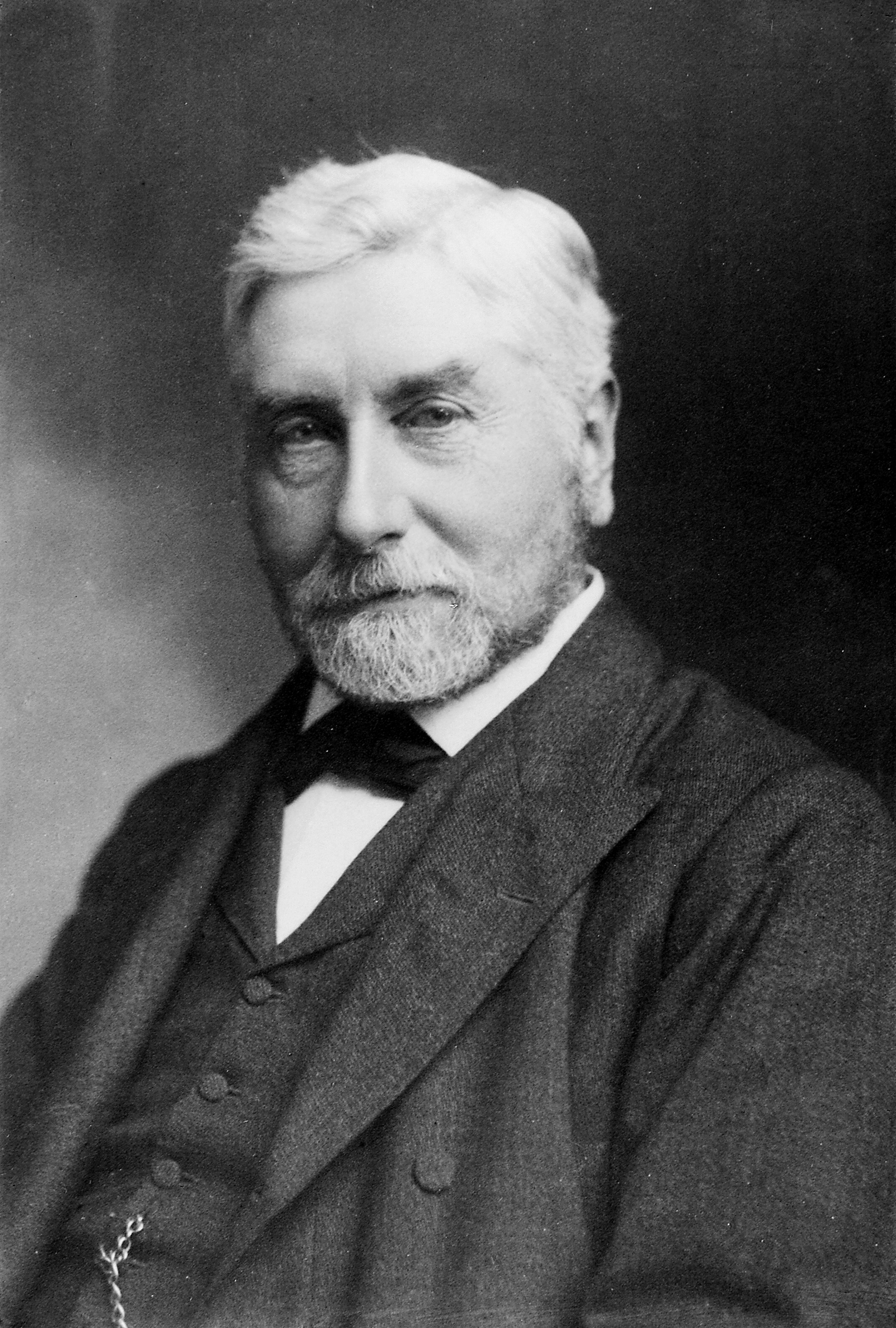
- Born: 1 July 1840; Margate, Kent, UKGBI
- Died: 16 March 1930 (aged 89); Aldeburgh, Suffolk, UK
- Occupations: Banker; anthropologist; writer
- Spouse(s): Eliza Garman (m. 1862; died 1911) Phyllis Maud Rope (m. 1914)
- Children: 8
- Relatives: Alan Clodd (grandson)

Edward Clodd (1 July 1840 – 16 March 1930) was an English banker, writer and anthropologist. He had a great variety of literary and scientific friends, who periodically met at Whitsunday (a springtime holiday) gatherings at his home at Aldeburgh in Suffolk.

== Biography ==
He was born in Margate, UKGBI (present-day UK) son of Edward Clodd, captain of a trading brig, and his wife Susan Parker. The family moved soon afterwards to Aldeburgh; his father's ancestors were from Parham and Framlingham in Suffolk. In a Baptist family, his parents wished him to become a minister, but he instead began a career in accountancy and banking, relocating to London in 1855. He was the only surviving child of seven. Edward first worked unpaid for six months at an accountant's office in Cornhill in London when he was 14 years of age. He worked for the London Joint Stock Bank from 1872 to 1915, and had residences both in London and Suffolk.

Clodd was an early devotee of the work of Charles Darwin and had personal acquaintance with Thomas Huxley and Herbert Spencer. He wrote biographies of all three men, and worked to popularise evolution with books like The Childhood of the World and The Story of Creation: A Plain Account of Evolution.

Clodd was an agnostic and wrote that the Genesis creation narrative of the Bible is similar to other religious myths and should not be read as a literal account. He wrote many popular books on evolutionary science. He wrote a biography of Thomas Henry Huxley and was a lecturer and populariser of anthropology and evolution.

Clodd was also a keen folklorist, joining the Folklore Society from 1878, and later becoming its president. He was a Suffolk Secretary of the Prehistoric Society of East Anglia from 1914 to 1916. He was a prominent member and officer of the Omar Khayyam Club or "O.K. Club", and organised the planting of the rose from Omar Khayyam's tomb on to the grave of Edward Fitzgerald at Boulge, Suffolk, at the Centenary gathering.

A group photo outside his Aldeburgh home: Thomas Hardy in the centre

Clodd had a talent for friendship, and liked to entertain his friends at literary gatherings in Aldeburgh at his seafront home there, Strafford House, during Whitsuntides. Prominent among his literary friends and correspondents were Grant Allen, George Meredith, Thomas Hardy, George Gissing, Edward Fitzgerald, Andrew Lang, Cotter Morison, Samuel Butler, Mary Kingsley and Mrs Lynn Linton; he also knew Sir Henry Thompson, Sir William Huggins, Sir Laurence Gomme, Sir John Rhys, Paul Du Chaillu, Edward Whymper, Alfred Comyn Lyall, York Powell, William Holman Hunt, Sir E. Ray Lankester, H. G. Wells and many others as acquaintances. His hospitality and friendship was an important part of the development of their social relations. George Gissing's close friendship with Clodd began when he accepted an invitation to a Whitsuntide gathering in Aldeburgh in 1895.

== Scepticism ==
Clodd was Chairman of the Rationalist Press Association from 1906 to 1913. He was skeptical about claims of the paranormal and psychical research, which he wrote were the result of superstition and the outcome of ignorance. Clodd criticised the spiritualist writings of Oliver Lodge as non-scientific. His book Question: A Brief History and Examination of Modern Spiritualism (1917) exposed fraudulent mediumship and the irrational belief in spiritualism and Theosophy.

== Personal life ==
On 20 August 1861, Clodd married Eliza Garman (1836–1911) with whom he had eight children, six of which survived infancy. Clodd and Garman later separated but did not divorce. In 1914, Clodd married Phyllis Maud Rope (1887–1957), a student at the Royal College of Science.

Through his son Harold Parker Clodd, a rubber broker, Clodd was the grandfather of Alan Clodd. Clodd died at Strafford House in Aldeburgh, Suffolk on 16 March 1930.

== Works ==
The following list is incomplete. Biographies of Darwin, Wallace, Bates and Spencer exist.

- 1872: The Childhood of the World
- 1875: The Birth and Growth of Myth and its Survival in Folk-Lore, Legend, and Dogma. Thomas Scott, London
- 1880: Jesus of Nazareth. Kegan Paul, London.
- 1882: Nature Studies. (with Grant Allen, Andrew Wilson, Thomas Foster and Richard Proctor) Wyman, London.
- 1888: The Story of Creation: A Plain Account of Evolution
- 1891: Myths and Dreams. Chatto & Windus, London.
- 1893: The Story of Human Origins (with S. Laing). Chapman & Hall, London.
- 1895: A Primer of Evolution Longmans, Green, New York.
- 1895: The Story of "Primitive" Man. Newnes, London; Appleton, New York.
- 1896: The Childhood of Religions. Kegan Paul, London.
- 1897: Pioneers of Evolution from Thales to Huxley. Grant Richards, London.
- 1898: Tom Tit Tot: An essay on savage philosophy in folk-tale.
- 1900: The story of the Alphabet. Newnes, London.
- 1900: Grant Allen: A Memoir.
- 1902: Thomas Henry Huxley. Blackwood & Sons, Edinburgh & London.
- 1905: Animism: the seed of religion. Constable, London.
- 1916: Memories. Chapman & Hall, London.
- 1917: The Question: If a Man Die, Shall He Live Again?. E. J. Clode, New York.
- 1920: Magic in Names & Other Things. Chapman & Hall, London.
- 1922: Occultism. The Hibbert Journal.
- 1922: Occultism: Two Lectures. Watts & Co, London.
- 1923: The Ultimate Guide to Brighton, England. McStewart & Earnshaw, London.
