= Vicky Randall =

English feminist scholar and political scientist (1945–2019)

Vicky Randall (born Mary Victoria Madge; 1945 – 2019) was a professor of political science and feminist scholar.

== Early life and education ==
Randall was born in Birmingham on 3 April 1945, to the novelist Inez Pearn (who published under her pen name, Elizabeth Lake) and the poet and sociologist Charles Madge, co-founder of Mass Observation and later professor of sociology at the University of Birmingham.

She studied at King Edward’s School in Birmingham and won a scholarship to Lady Margaret Hall, Oxford, to study English, but decided to go to Cambridge instead to study history at Newnham College. She was at Cambridge from 1964 to 1967. She completed her master's degree in Russian and Soviet politics at the London School of Economics in 1968, staying on to complete a Ph.D. on decision-making in local government.

== Career ==
While researching her Ph.D. she taught at the Polytechnic of Central London (later to become the University of Westminster) and subsequently at the University of Essex, where she became professor of politics. Her special interests were political science and international relations, politics and gender. Over the course of her career, she published a large number of enduring works including Women and Politics (1982),The Politics of Child Daycare in Britain (2000) and Politics in the Developing World (2005), which she co-edited with Peter Burnell and Lise Rakner. From 1998 to 2006 she co-edited the journal of Commonwealth and Comparative Politics of which she was the first female editor.

She served as chair of the Political Studies Association for three years, from 2008 until 2011 and received a Special Recognition Award from the PSA in 2012, in recognition of “her tireless work integrating gender analysis into political science and her efforts to secure fairer representation of women in political life and the study of politics”. She was named a Fellow of the Academy of Social Sciences (FacSS) in 2009. Pippa Norris, a Harvard comparative political scientist, described her as “a pioneer who paved the way for us”; her friend and colleague John Bartle wrote, “She was gentle and self-effacing but fiercely intelligent and brave, and possessed deeply held values, which she expressed in both her life and work.”

Following her formal retirement in 2010, Vicky became the Emeritus Professor in the Department of Government at the University of Essex.

== Family ==
Vicky’s childhood was mainly spent in Birmingham with her parents and younger brother William, although there were also periods spent abroad, notably a year in Thailand. She married twice and had a son and a daughter from her second marriage.

== Publications ==
=== Books ===
• Women and Politics, An International Perspective, Vicky Randall, University of Chicago Press, 1982 (2nd Edition, Red Globe Press, 1987).

• Political Change and Underdevelopment: A Critical Introduction to Third World Politics, Vicky Randall and Robin Theobald, Duke University Press, 1985.

• Political Parties in the Third World, Vicky Randall (Editor), Sage Publications, 1988.

• Contemporary Feminist Politics: Women and Power in Britain, Joni Lovenduski and Vicky Randall, Oxford University Press, 1993.

• The Middle East and Problems of Democracy, Heather Deegan (Editor) and Vicky Randall (Editor), Taylor and Francis Group, 1993.

• Religion in Third World Politics, Jeffrey Haynes and Vicky Randall (Editor), Taylor & Francis Group, 1993.

• Democracy in the Third World, Robert Pinkney and Vicky Randall, L. Rienner Publishers, 1994.

• Foreign Aid in a Changing World, Peter J. Burnell and Vicky Randall (Editor), Open University Press, 1997.

• Gender, Politics and the State, Vicky Randall (Editor) and Georgina Waylen (Editor), Routledge, 1998.

• Political Change and Underdevelopment, A Critical Introduction to Third World Politics, Vicky Randall and Robin Theobald, 1985 (2nd Edition, Red Globe Press, 1998).

• Democratization and the Media, Vicky Randall (Editor), Routledge,1998.

• The Politics of Child Daycare in Britain, Vicky Randall, Oxford University Press, 2000.

• Politics in the Developing World, Peter Burnell (Editor), Vicky Randall (Editor), Lise Rakner (Editor), Oxford University Press, 2005.

• Spanish Portrait by Elizabeth Lake, with an afterword by Vicky Randall, The Clapton Press, 2019.

=== Research Articles ===
Vicky Randall published numerous research articles, too many to list here, but a sample of articles and reviews available online (some with restricted access) is given below:

• Gendering Political Science, Vicky Randall, published as Chapter 1 of Deeds and Words, Gendering Politics after Joni Lovenduski, edited by Rosie Campbell and Sarah Childs, ECPR Press, 2014

• Gender in Contemporary British Politics, Vicky Randall, Joni Lovenduski, The British Journal of Politics and International Relations, vol. 6, 1: pp. 1–2., First Published Feb 1, 2004.

• Party Institutionalization in New Democracies, Vicky Randall, Lars Svåsand, Party Politics, vol. 8, 1: pp. 5–29., First Published Jan 1, 2002.

• Feminism and Political Analysis, Vicky Randall, Political Studies, vol. 39, 3: pp. 513–532., First Published Sep 1, 1991.

• Teaching about Women and Politics, Vicky Randall, Politics, vol. 3, 1: pp. 38–42., First Published Feb 1, 1983.
