= Kenneth Robinson (historian) =

British civil servant

Kenneth Ernest Robinson CBE FRHistS (9 March 1914 – 18 January 2005) was a British civil servant and academic who specialised in colonial and Commonwealth affairs.

Robinson was educated at the Sir George Monoux Grammar School and Hertford College, Oxford, where he took Firsts in PPE and Modern History. In 1936 he joined the Colonial Office, reaching the rank of Assistant Secretary in 1946, before resigning in 1948. That year he succeeded to Margery Perham as Reader in Commonwealth Government at Oxford, becoming a fellow of Nuffield College at the same time. In 1957, he became the Director of the Institute of Commonwealth Studies, University of London, also serving as one of the first co-editors of the Journal of Commonwealth Political Studies, subsequently Commonwealth & Comparative Politics, from 1961 to 1965. From October 1965 to 1972, he served as the Vice-Chancellor of the University of Hong Kong.

Robinson was appointed a Commander of the Order of the British Empire in 1971.
