= George Mills Harper =

American literary scholar (b. 1914, d. 2006)

George Mills Harper (born November 5, 1914, in Linn Creek, Missouri - died on January 29, 2006, in Tallahassee, Florida) was an American academic, a WW2 U.S. Navy officer and professor emeritus of English literature. Harper is remembered today, mainly, as a literary scholar of the Irish poet and mystic, W. B. Yeats, who was a Nobel laureate in literature (1923). He is known for his prolific publications and authoritative books about Yeats's lifelong occult activity and interests, which began and developed early in his poetical career. Harper was also, for a much lesser extent, an academic scholar of the Neoplatonism of William Blake.

== Military service ==
Living in Chapel Hill, NC, Harper joined the U.S. Navy on May 4, 1942, and was assigned to Frontier Base Mayport, FL. During World War II, he served as executive officer of the Receiving Station, Naval Supply Depot, and Naval Detachment in Oran, Algeria, and commanding officer of the Naval Detachment, Naples, Italy. Harper was released from Active Duty on October 3, 1946. He remained in the U.S. Naval Reserve until retirement. During his reserve career, Harper served as Commanding Officer, Naval Reserve Surface Battalion 6-9, Sixth Naval District, Durham, North Carolina. He moved to Tallahassee, FL in 1970. He retired from the U.S. Naval Reserve on November 5, 1974.

== Academic career ==
Harper received his Ph.D. in English in 1951 from the University of North Carolina. He was also a Robert O. Lawton Distinguished Professor of English at Florida State University. He previously served as professor and dean of the College of Arts and Sciences at Virginia Tech and chairman of the English departments at the University of Florida and the University of North Carolina at Chapel Hill. He was an author and editor of 12 books, primarily concerning the Irish poet William Butler Yeats. Among his many published books about W. B. Yeats, were Yeats's Golden Dawn, W. B. Yeats and W.T. Horton, Yeats and the Occult (as an editor). Further publications were: A Critical Edition of Yeats's A Vision (1925) (editor with W.K. Hood), and The Making of Yeats's A Vision and Yeats's Vision Papers books series. He received an Honorary Doctorate of Letters from Trinity College, Dublin, Ireland, for his contributions to Yeats' studies.

In regard to the contributions to the scholarship of William Blake, Harper wrote and published his book, The Neoplatonism of William Blake. Another contribution to the Neoplatonism studies was his collaboration with Kathleen Raine in writing the book Thomas Taylor the Platonist: Selected Writings.

== Select bibliography ==
- The Neoplatonism of William Blake. The University of North Carolina Press. 1961 ISBN 978-0-758-11825-7
- Yeats's Golden Dawn. Macmillan. 1974. ISBN 978-0333150306
- Yeats and the Occult. GM Harper, editor. Macmillan. 1976 ISBN 978-1-349-02937-2
- The Making of Yeats's Vision: A Study of the Automatic Script. 2 vols. Macmillan. 1987. Vol. I: ISBN 978-1349056248; Vol II: ISBN 978-0809313433; Two volume set: ISBN 978-0333414095.
- Yeats's Vision Papers. 4 vols. George Mills Harper, general editor and Mary Jane Harper, editorial assistant. Macmillan. 1992 (vol. I-III), 2001 (vol. IV). Vol I: ISBN 0-333-49443-1; Vol. II: ISBN 0-333-49442-3; Vol. III: ISBN 0-333-49444-X; Vol IV: ISBN 0-333-91326-4.
