= Inez Pearn =

British novelist

Marie Agnes Pearn
- Born: Marie Agnes Pearn; 1913; United Kingdom
- Died: February 1976 (aged 62–63); France
- Education: Somerville College, University of Oxford
- Occupation: Novelist
- Spouses: Stephen Spender (m. 1936; div. 1939); Charles Madge (m. 1942)
- Children: 2 (including Vicky Randall)
- Writing career
- Pen name: Elizabeth Lake
- Years active: 1945–1958
- Notable works: Spanish Portrait (1945); Marguerite Reilly (1946); The Lovers Disturbed (1949); The First Rebellion (1951); Siamese Counterpart (1958)

Marie Agnes Pearn (1913–1976), known as Inez Pearn and by the pen name Elizabeth Lake, was a British novelist who was acclaimed for her "remorseless interest in emotional truth", her "formidable ... characterisation", and her ability to evoke places with "almost magical clarity". The author and critic Elizabeth Bowen considered that she belonged to the school of literary realism.

== Early life and education ==
Pearn was born in 1913 to Margaret Nichols, a third-generation Irish immigrant, and William Pearn, a Cornishman. Her father died before she was born and she spent most of her childhood in convent boarding-schools and orphanages while her mother worked as a governess in Europe. Pearn described her childhood in some detail in Marguerite Reilly, her second novel, which was closely based on her family history, spanning four generations since their arrival from Ireland in the mid-1840s, and The First Rebellion, which focuses on an incident during her time as a sixth-former in a Catholic convent boarding school in London.

Pearn spent the summer of 1933 working as a governess to the children of a wealthy family in San Sebastián, Spain. She then won a scholarship to study Spanish Literature at Somerville College, Oxford, where she was close friends with Marghanita Laski and Sally Graves. She was back in San Sebastián the following summer, chaperoned by her cousin, to work as a freelance English teacher. She returned to Madrid in the spring of 1936, this time winning a bursary to pursue research work on her doctoral thesis on Góngora. Unable to return as planned to Madrid in the summer of 1936, as a result of the military uprising in July, Pearn became involved in the Aid to Spain movement at Oxford. To demonstrate her commitment to the Spanish Republican cause, she had changed her name to Inez.

== Career ==
Between 1945 and 1958, Pearn published five novels, at least three of them highly autobiographical. Pearn completed a draft of her first novel, Spanish Portrait, in 1937. Her visits to Spain and her romantic involvement, first with a Spanish diplomat and later with an unsuccessful portrait artist, provided the background material for Spanish Portrait, which gives an insightful first hand impression of the confusion and apprehension of the period known in Spanish as the bienio negro, as the Spanish Republic drifted inexorably towards a violent confrontation. The novel was warmly received when it was published in 1945, under the pen name Elizabeth Lake (the name of her maternal grandmother). Elizabeth Bowen, reviewing it in The Tatler, described it as "a remarkable first novel .. a love story, but of an unusual kind - the two characters are in conflict, the love they feel is unwilling, and the love pursues an at once aimless and painful course. ... the outbreak of .. war leaves the fate of one of the characters a mystery." Bowen considered the characterisation of the man "a masterpiece" – he was "indolent, incalculable, conservative", while the author had "succeeded in putting across on us one of the most odious, arid, shrewish and egocentric young heroines on record ... and ... in investing the love-affair ... with mystery, pain and poetry." The Daily Herald also thought it "a good book": "the clash of conventions is movingly and amusingly done", and "the romance ends, as romance often does, with influenza." The novel was also reviewed in the New Statesman by the poet Henry Reed.

Marguerite Reilly, Pearn's second novel, also received positive reviews, although one reviewer found it "too long, but must not be missed", and another "very, though not too, long". The heroine was considered "a formidable piece of characterisation", "an extraordinary study ... [a] feature of the tale is the masterly manner in which the author builds up Marguerite's portrait." The story focuses on Marguerite, the eldest of a family of working-class Irish Catholics living in the north-east of England, and her two sisters and niece. Marguerite is determined to better herself and her family; she is "boastful, unscrupulous, generous-hearted"; "a dominating, deplorable and heroic character, on a scale that English fiction seldom affords;" "through the skill of the author, a very living person emerges." Reviewers described the novel as "carefully and imaginatively written", "exceptionally vital", and felt that the author had a "rare gift for keeping a tale going." Reviews were also carried in other leading international publications, including The New York Times (which described it as "unusual ... a total surprise"), The Spectator, The Listener (by Henry Reed), and The Bell literary magazine, Dublin. It even made the recommended reading list in The British Journal of Nursing, perhaps because Marguerite trains and works as a nurse, as do, eventually, her two sisters.

The Lovers Disturbed (1949) features "a young man who goes to visit his uncle's widow in the country ... meets the doctor's daughter and they fall in love." The aunt, however, is "bed-ridden and bad-tempered", "a grotesque and repulsive old drunkard", who makes her nurse spy on the lovers. The Tatler recommended it "for its lack of sentimentality, for the skill with which the gloom is frequently relieved by subtle humour, and for the sheer perfection of Miss Lake's style," while The Sphere said "it is the development of the four characters ... which will hold the reader and reveal the writer's quite exceptional talent and quality."

Pearn drew on her time as a student at a Catholic boarding school in London, run by nuns from the Convent of Notre Dame de Namur, in writing The First Rebellion. The heroine, Peggy, was "a robust young person", who "falls foul of a nun and goes back to school one term to find that her enemy has been appointed headmistress." Reviewers compared this novel to Antonia White's Frost in May, with one saying "this new book is certainly in the same class."

During the 1950s, Pearn and her husband spent a year in Thailand, which provided the inspiration for her final novel, Siamese Counterpart. The main characters are Dick, a British doctor working for the Thai government; Audrey, who is in love with Dick and has flown from England to join him; Rosukon, a Thai princess and doctor who is the "counterpart" appointed to work with Dick as a condition of his employment; and Ted, a British botanist who fell in love with Audrey at a party in Bangkok. Reviewers commented on the "magical loveliness of the country" evoked by the author, her sense of humour, and her ability to "create for us people we shall not quickly forget"; it is "a novel in which people, silly, imperfect, fascinating human beings, and not an elaborate plot, make the story's motive."

== Personal life ==
A contemporary of hers at Notre Dame School in Southwark, run by a Belgian order of nuns, provides an insight into Pearn's personal allure, as well as the extent of the achievement for a girl of her background to win a scholarship to Oxford at that time: "As well as her beauty, regal manner and reputedly formidable intellect, she had the most wonderful voice […] She sang ‘Ave Maria’ with such clear bell-like notes in the school hall at the end of term [...] Then to crown everything we heard that she had won a scholarship to Oxford University. Oxford! The word itself was magic. University was far enough beyond our reach. I had not heard of a single soul, other than our teachers, who had gone to one."

While at Oxford, Pearn had several affairs, with, among others, A. J. Ayer and Philip Toynbee. She also met poet Stephen Spender in Oxford and married him in December 1936 after a three-week engagement. In 1938, she met the poet and sociologist Charles Madge, who was married at that time to the poet Kathleen Raine. She left Spender the following year and married Madge in 1942, after their respective divorces. They had two children: a daughter, Vicky Randall, and a son. On Madge's retirement in 1970, they moved to France, restoring an old farm house, where they spent the next five years. Pearn developed cancer in 1975 and died in February 1976, shortly after her 62nd birthday.

Early in 1938, Pearn was captured in a portrait by William Coldstream, a process that involved some 40 sittings. The painting is now held in the archives at the Tate Britain. There is also a series of studies of her by the Bauhaus photographer Lucia Moholy, two of which are held at the National Portrait Gallery in London.

== Novels ==
- Spanish Portrait. 29 May 2019. (Pilot Press, 1945) — Republished with an afterword by her daughter, Vicky Randall, by The Clapton Press, 2019, ISBN 978-1-9996543-2-0
- Marguerite Reilly. 20 August 2019. (Pilot Press, 1946) — Republished by The Clapton Press, 2019, ISBN 978-1-9996543-1-3
- The Lovers Disturbed (Cresset Press, 1949)
- The First Rebellion (Cresset Press, 1951)
- Siamese Counterpart (Cresset Press, 1958)
