= Asbjørn Rødseth =

Norwegian economist (1951–2025)

Asbjørn Rødseth (19 March 1951 – 12 November 2025) was a Norwegian economist.

== Life and career ==
Rødseth was born in Harstad, and graduated with the cand.oecon. degree in 1976. He has been professor at the University of Oslo from 1989. He was the dean of the Faculty of Social Sciences until 2007.

He was a board member of Norges Bank, the Norwegian Central Bank, from 1 January 2004, and later served a second term, which expired on 31 December 2011.

Rødseth died on 12 November 2025, at the age of 74.

Academic offices
Preceded by	Dean of the Faculty of Social Sciences, University of Oslo –2007	Succeeded by Knut Heidar
