= Commonwealth & Comparative Politics =

- Discipline: Comparative politics
- Language: English
- Edited by: Andrew Wyatt, Nicola de Jeger

Publication details
- Former name(s): Journal of Commonwealth Political Studies, The Journal of Commonwealth & Comparative Politics
- History: 1961–present
- Publisher: Routledge
- Frequency: Quarterly

Standard abbreviations
- ISO 4: Commonw. Comp. Politics

Indexing
- ISSN: 1466-2043 (print); 1743-9094 (web)
- LCCN: 2013203809
- OCLC no.: 473437024

Links
- Journal homepage; Online access; Online archive

Commonwealth & Comparative Politics is a quarterly peer-reviewed academic journal of political science covering comparative politics, with an emphasis on the Commonwealth of Nations. It was established in 1961 as the Journal of Commonwealth Political Studies and renamed The Journal of Commonwealth & Comparative Politics in 1974, before obtaining its current title in 1998. The editors-in-chief are Andrew Wyatt (University of Bristol) and Nicola de Jager (Stellenbosch University). Past editors include Vicky Randall, Colin Leys, and Kenneth Robinson (historian). The journal is published by Routledge.

== Abstracting and indexing ==
The journal is abstracted and indexed in:

- EBSCO databases
- Emerging Sources Citation Index
- Scopus
