= Brofjorden =

Fjord in Bohuslän, Sweden

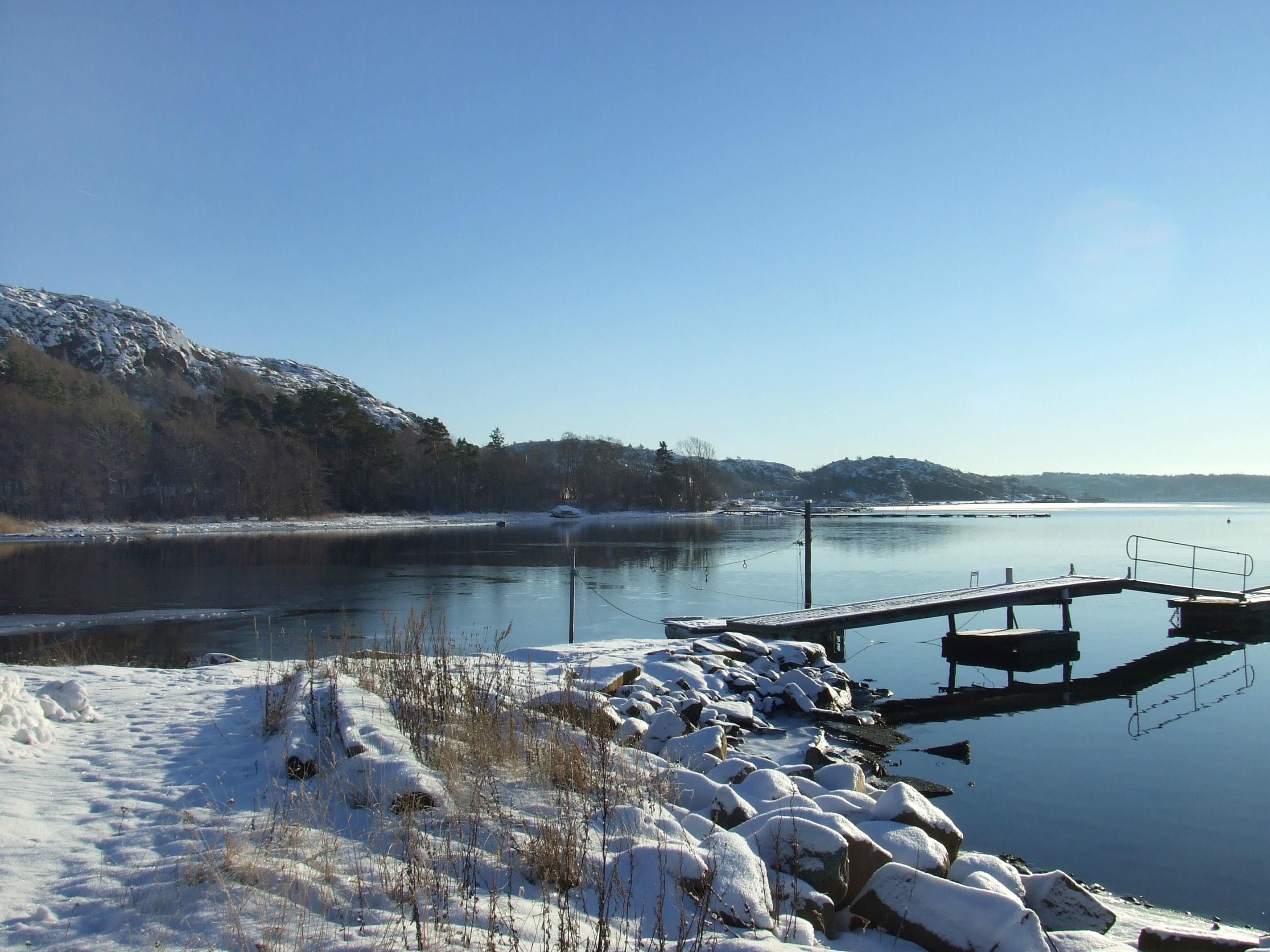
- Northeast part of Brofjorden at Holländaröd

- Location within Västra Götaland Location within Sweden
- Location: Västra Götaland County, Sweden
- Coordinates: 58°21′35″N 11°25′26″E
- River sources: Broälven
- Primary outflows: Skagerrak
- Max. length: 4 mi (6.4 km)
- Frozen: shallow parts Jan-Feb
- Islands: Ryxö; Arö
- Sections/sub-basins: Trommekilen 58°21′09.3″N 11°26′46.6″E

Brofjorden is a fjord in Lysekil Municipality, Bohuslän, Sweden. It cuts into Västra Götaland County in a southwest–northeasterly direction between the Stångenäset and Härnäset peninsulas. Situated between Gullmarn and Åbyfjorden, it is the smallest of these fjords. Brofjorden Port in the fjord is Sweden's largest oil port.

== History ==
During the Stone Age, Bronze Age and Iron Age, Brofjorden was navigable as far up north as Brodalen. The shoreline has receded about 2 km (1.2 mi) to the south since then. The area has been filled in with silt and clay, leaving only the minor Broälven river in the middle of the former north part of the fjord. The surrounding area is rich with pre-Medieval archaeological finds. On Broberg hill are the remnants of a 12th-century fort and the oldest parts of the nearby Bro Church, are from the Middle Ages.

The Ryxö island in the middle of Brofjorden, was a strategic point in the local waterways during the Bronze Age. There are number of cairns on the island and the adjacent shores.

=== 1600–1700s ===
When herring fishing peaked in the 17th and 18th century, fishing industries flourished all around Brofjorden. The primary products were salted herring and train oil made from boiled herring to extract the oil. The salted herring was sold to traders from Germany and Holland, and the train oil was exported to London, Paris and New York to be used in street lamps. The purest oil, filtrated ten times, was produced at Norra Grundsund just south of the mouth of Brofjorden.

=== Early 1900s ===
At the beginning of the 20th century, there were several canned food factories around Brofjorden to process the herring and other sea food products. Because of the good quality of the water, there was an oyster farm in the fjord around 1920. By then most if the fishing industry had closed down. The herring fishing had declined and by 1915, mackerel had disappeared from the fjord, only subsistence fishing done by people living by the fjord remained. The canning factory at Sjöbol (58°21′13.4″N 11°26′03.5″E) was later razed to make way for the product terminal at Brofjorden Port.

=== Granite quarries ===
About ten granite quarries were started along the shores of Bjofjorden at the end of the 19th century. Quays and jetties were built at places such as Skalhamn, Fiskebäcksvik, Sjöbol, Lahälla, Rixö, Vinbräcka, Hjälmedal, Sandvik, Loddebo, Ingeröd, and Krabbevik. The red granite was quarried right by the shoreline and loadad onto boats from several European nations. The stone was shipped to be used in urban construction all over Europe. The steep cliffs also allowed ships to moor right by the shores and fill their fresh water supply directly from the small waterfalls that formed after heavy rain, instead if carry it aboard manually. The quarries were in use until the 1930s, when the Great Depression forced them to fold.

=== World War II ===
During World War II, Brofjorden served as a storage site for part of Operation Bridford. Norwegian boats and ships of all types and sizes came with cargoes consisting of machine parts, especially ball bearings for the British weapons industry, which were transferred to British blockade runners crossing the Skagerrak. According to a German captain on a ship loading granite at Rixö quarry, who served on board a submarine during the war, German submarines also used the deep fjord. They would go there to get away from the fighting for a couple of days, to let the crew rest, sleep and "catch their breath".

=== Oil refinery ===
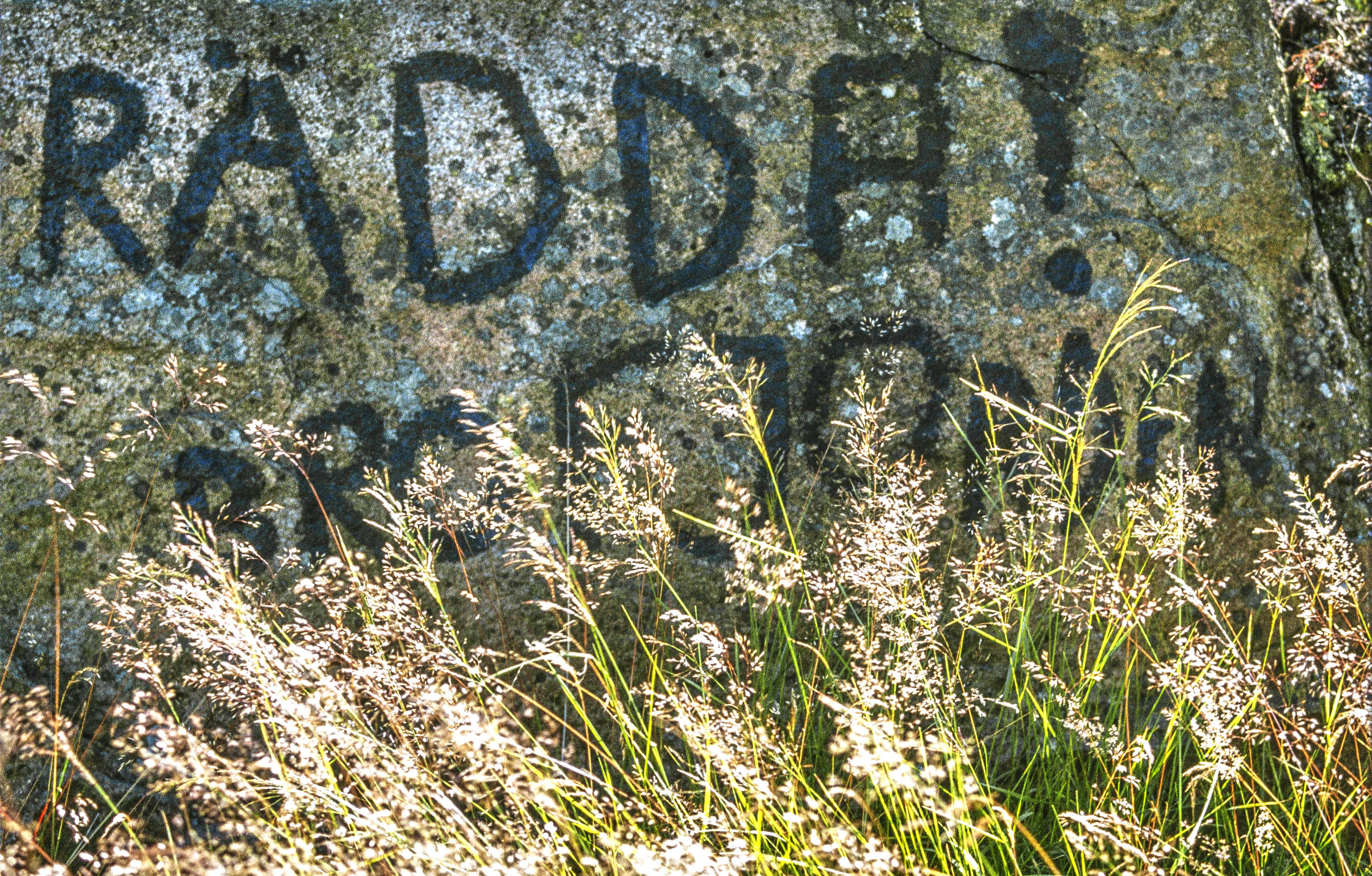
The Rädda Brofjorden! slogan is still visible on cliffs around the fjord.

Plans for a refinery had been discussed ever since the Swedish consumer-owned oil company Oljekonsumenters Riksförbund (OK), was formed in 1945. There were many long and heated debates in the 1960s, about where the refinery should be located. The two main proposed sites were Brofjorden and Hisingen in Gothenburg. The fjord was deep and wide enough to accommodate large oil tankers, while Hisingen provided an already exploited area with infrastructure on land. Those against establishing the refinery at Brofjorden were in majority, led by Swedish Society for Nature Conservation. An association under the slogan Rädda Brofjorden! ("Save Brofjorden!") was formed and with the newly awakened interest for nature conservation, they received a lot of coverage in media.

Due to the massive protests, environmental issues and safety became two of the main concerns in planning the refinery. Since the plant would also be very visible in the landscape by the fjord, one of the directives was to make it "the world's most beautiful oil refinery ever". Trial runs with tankers were made on the fjord in summer 1970. The largest tanker to test the fjord was the 230,000-ton supertanker Texaco Frankfurt. As of 2015, the largest ship to enter the fjord is the 470,000 dwt Burmah Enterprize.

On 25 November 1970, the government voted in favor of the Brofjorden site and in September 1971, permission was granted to OK to start building the refinery. At an estimated cost of SEK 750–800 million, the refinery was inaugurated on 29 May 1975. While the plant and the storage tanks for the oil products are above ground and visible for miles around the site, the crude oil is stored in four large cisterns that can hold up to 800,000 m^{3} (28,000,000 ft^{3}), blasted out of the granite bedrock below the plant.

== Brofjorden Port ==
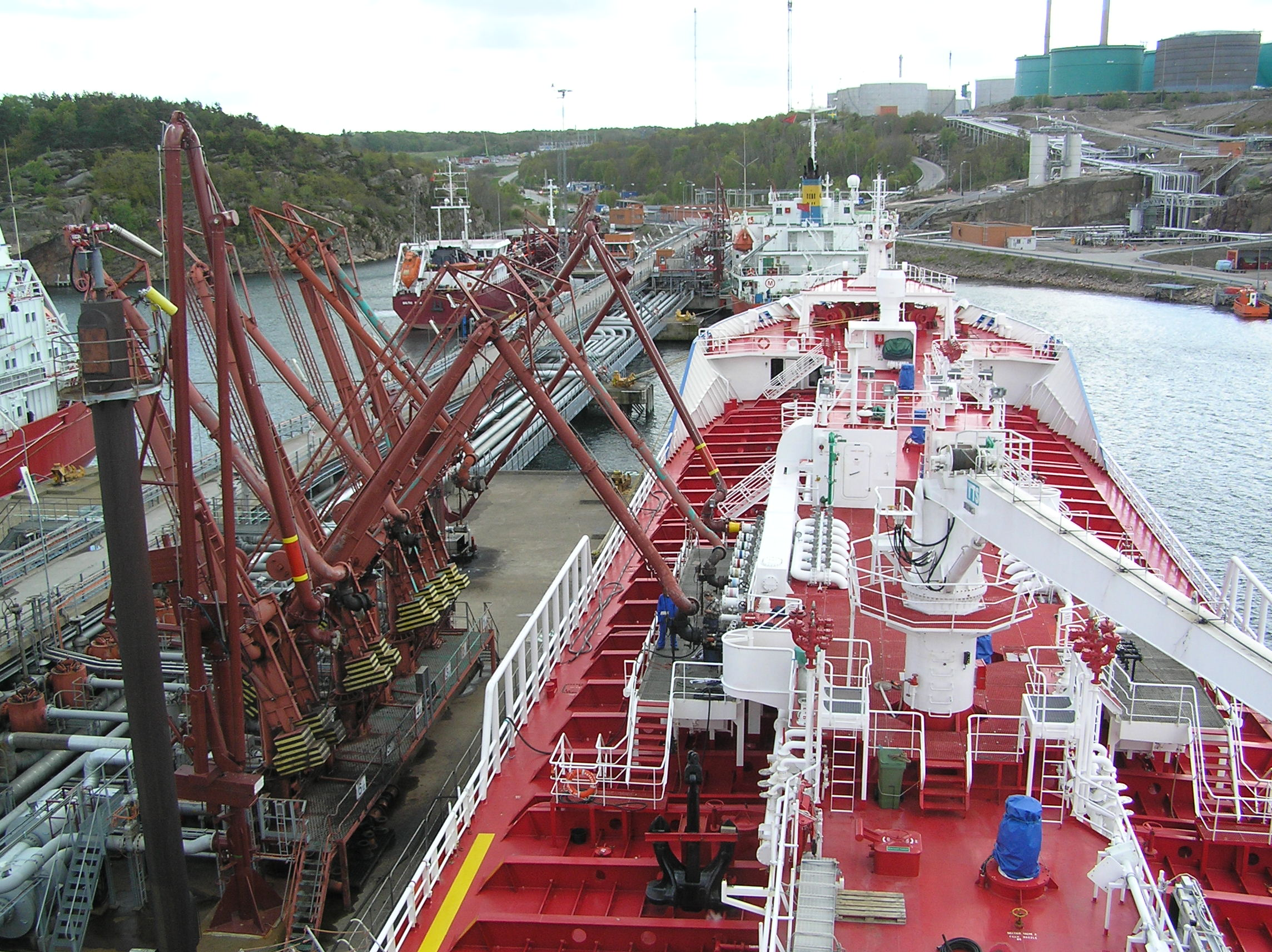
Bit Oktania loading at the product terminal

Sweden's biggest oil port, Brofjorden Port, is located near the mouth of the fjord on the southeast side. With about 22 million ton of cargo handled annually, it is also Sweden's second biggest port. The port facilities at Brofjorden are owned by Preemraff Lysekil oil refinery.

The port has six berths, one for crude oil and five jetties for oil products. The crude oil harbor just southwest of the sea lane, is 135 m (443 ft) long with a depth of 28 m (92 ft) and can receive tankers up to 500,000 dwt. The product terminal jetties located on the south shore of the Trommekilen part of the fjord, are a total of 380 m (1,250 ft) and can accommodate tankers up to 80,000 dwt. More than 11 million ton crude oil is delivered to the port every year. In 2015, a system for loading and unloading liquid natural gas at −162 °C (−260 °F) was installed. On average, there are five tankers per day visiting Brofjorden. In 2014, the port received 1,400 ships.

== Nature reserves ==
There are two nature reserve at Brofjorden, Ryxö island and Broälven. Ryxö, sometimes spelt Rixö, established in 1968 with an area of 61 ha (150 acres), is an island in the middle of the fjord. The central part is the island has a deciduous forest, mainly oaks and meadows intersected by steep cliffs. Broälven, established in 1995 with an area of 194 ha (480 acres) comprises the land at the shallow north end of Brofjorden and the banks of Broälven which has its outlet in the fjord. The shallow area at the mouth of the river is a valuable habitat for sea trouts.

In January 2015, three killer whales, a male, a female and a calf, were spotted at the mouth of Brofjorden. They were following a tanker heading for the port at the oil refinery.

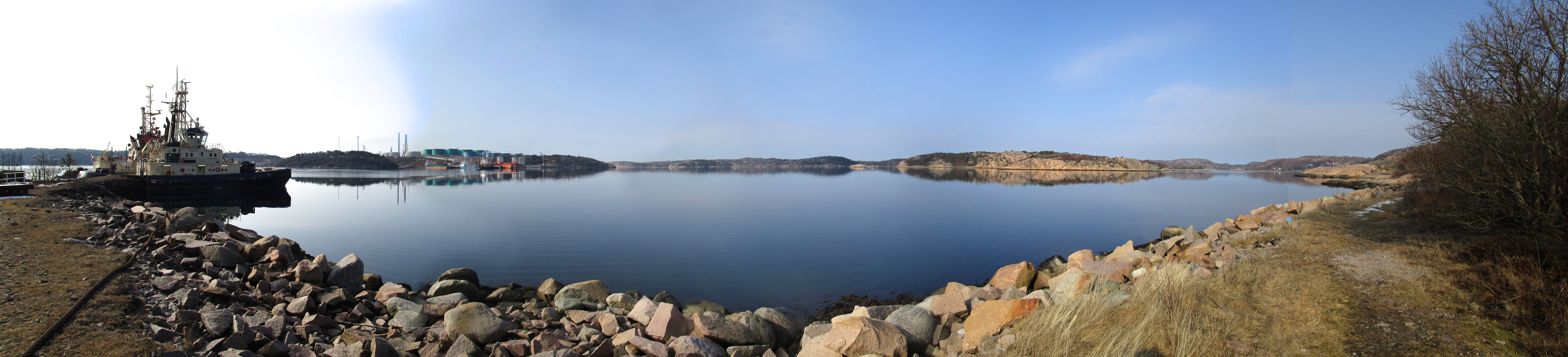
Brofjorden panorama as seen from Lahälla with Preemraff oil refinery in the background.
