= Tor Rødseth =

Norwegian economist (1928–2007)

Tor Rødseth (1928–2007) was a Norwegian economist.

He was born in Harstad, and graduated with the cand.oecon. degree in 1952. He was a docent at the Norwegian School of Economics and Business Administration from 1962 to 1974 and a professor at the University of Bergen from 1974 to 1993.
