= MS Elisabeth Bakke =

Norwegian tweendecker (1937–1974)

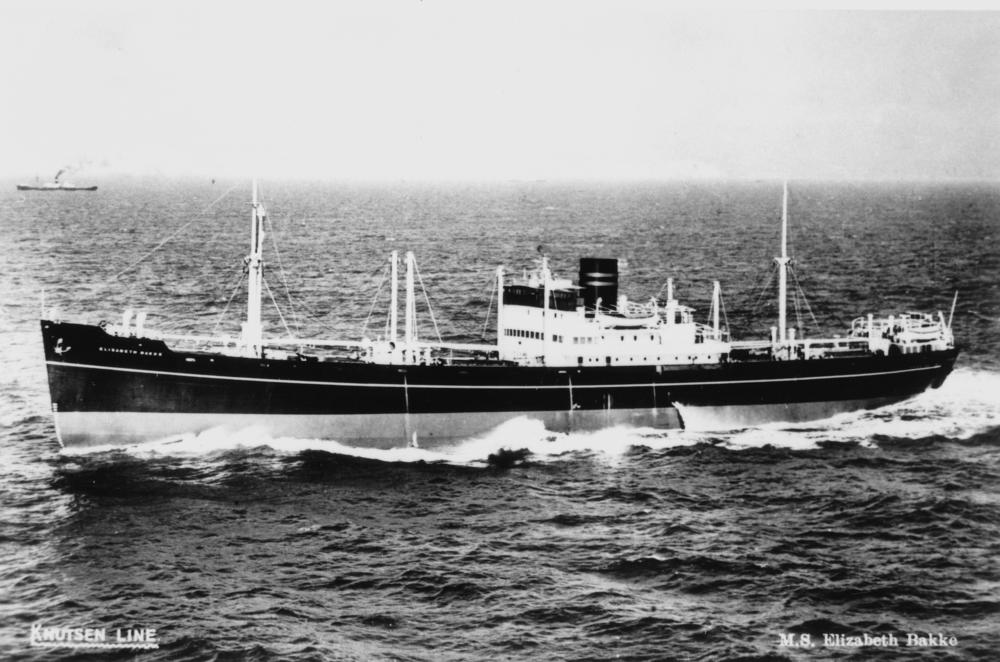

History

Norway
- Name: Elisabeth Bakke (1937-1970); Elisabeth (1970-1973); Bigra (1973-1974)
- Namesake: Elisabeth Bakke
- Owner: Knutsen OAS Shipping (1937-1940); Nortraship (1940-1945); Knutsen OAS Shipping (1945-1970); Mesa Industry & Shipping (1970-1971); Lorentzens Rederi Company (1971-1973); Birger Gran (1973-1974)
- Operator: Knutsen Line (1937-1940); Nortraship (1940-1945); Knustsen Line (1945-1963); Jeanette Skinner & Co. (1963-1970); Mesa Shipping (1970-1971); Lorentzens Rederi Company (1971-1973); Birger Gran (1973-1974)
- Port of registry: Haugesund, Norway
- Route: West Coast of the United States - East Asia
- Ordered: 1 September 1935
- Builder: A/B Götaverken
- Yard number: 503
- Completed: March 1937
- Renamed: 1970 (to Elisabeth); 1973 (to Bigra)
- Identification: Call sign: LJJX; IMO number: 5101419
- Fate: Scrapped in Bilbao, 1974

General characteristics
- Type: Tweendecker
- Tonnage: 5,450 GRT; 3,262 NRT; 8,540 DWT
- Length: 453.2 feet (138.1 m)
- Beam: 58.8 feet (17.9 m)
- Depth: 26 feet (7.9 m)
- Propulsion: 6-cylinder DV Götaverken B&W
- Speed: 16 knots (18 mph; 30 km/h)

MS Elisabeth Bakke was a Norwegian tweendecker that participated in Operation Rubble. During the operation, she escaped a German blockade of Sweden on 15 March 1940 with four other ships that were also registered in Norway. The ship operated under various companies between 1937 and 1974, though she was largely owned by Knutsen OAS Shipping.

== Construction ==
Elisabeth Bakke was ordered on 1 September 1935, built in A/B Götaverken's shipyard in Gothenburg, Sweden. The ship was delivered in March 1937. She was listed as yard number 503. She and her four sister ships—all following an X Bakke naming convention—were built for the run from West Coast ports to China, the Philippines, Malaysia, and the Dutch East Indies. However, Elisabeth Bakke was registered in Haugesund, Norway, and flew the Norwegian flag. The ship was built for the Norwegian Knutsen Line, a subsidiary of Knutsen OAS Shipping. She was classified as a tweendecker, a type of cargo ship.

=== Specifications ===
The ship was 453.2 feet (138.1 m) long, 58.8 feet (17.9 m) wide, and had a depth of 26 feet (7.9 m). She was 5,450 gross register tons, 3,262 net register tons, and 8,540 tons deadweight. Her engine was a six-cylinder 2T DV Götaverken B&W of 620 millimetres (24 in), capable of producing 6,900 horsepower and 4,779 kilowatts. Elisabeth Bakke could travel at a maximum speed of 16 knots (18 mph; 30 km/h). Her call sign was LJJX and her IMO number was 5101419.

== Service history ==
=== World War II ===
Elisabeth Bakke departed New York City for Sweden on 15 March 1940. She remained in the port until 9 April, when German forces invaded neighboring Norway, and remained laid-up in harbor for several months. She met up with four other Norwegian-registered vessels in Gothenburg, Sweden, in early December 1940. The five ships were to take part in Operation Rubble, a British plan to break the German blockade of the Baltic Sea and get merchant ships out of German hands. The group of merchant vessels departed on 30 December 1940 and anchored in Brofjorden due to poor visibility. They set out once more on 23 January 1941, narrowly avoiding two German battleships. Once reaching the North Sea, the group was joined by British warships and RAF airplanes. Elisabeth Bakke arrived in Kirkwall, Scotland, on 25 January.

Following this, Elisabeth Bakke regularly made transatlantic voyages in convoys. She also saw some minor service in the Mediterranean. She was returned to her original owners in October 1945 after service with Nortraship, an organization created to monitor Norway's merchant fleet after the German invasion.

=== Post-war ownership ===
Elisabeth Bakke was transferred in 1963 from the Knutsen Line to Jeanette Skinner & Co., a different subsidiary of Knutsen OAS. The ship was sold in 1970 to Mesa Industries & Shipping A/S, where she was renamed to Elisabeth. She was laid up in Sandefjord, Norway, on 30 June 1971, and was sold to the Lorentzens Rederi Company of Oslo later that year. After that, the ship was sold to Birger Gran in January 1973 and renamed to Bigra. She was eventually sold to Spanish breakers in 1974, leaving Sandefjord on 3 March and arriving in Bilbao, Spain, on 11 March.

== See also ==
- MT Ranja
