= MV Gay Viking =

Blockade runner of the British Merchant Navy

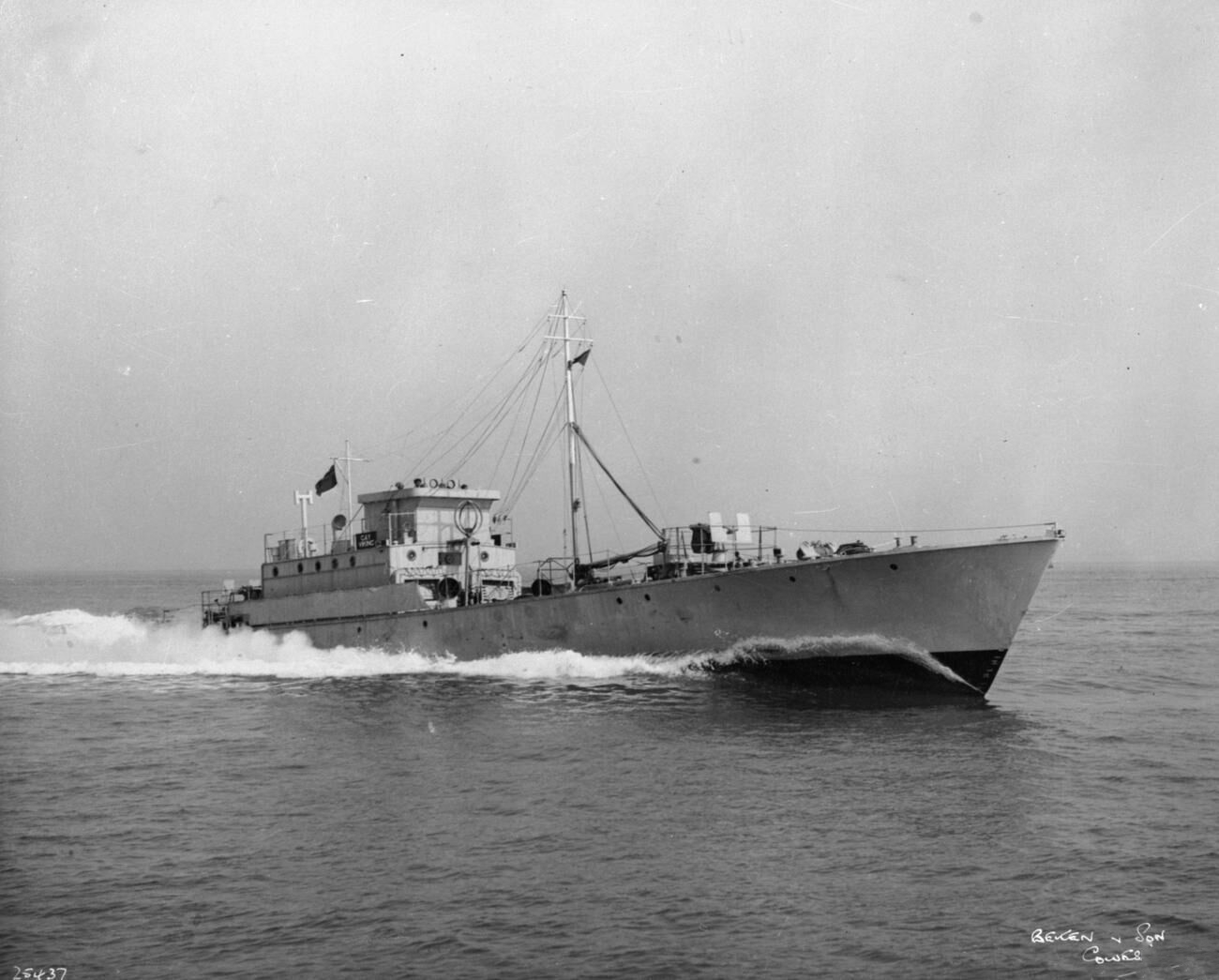

History

United Kingdom
- Name: MV Gay Viking
- Builder: Camper & Nicholson
- Completed: July 1943
- Fate: Sunk in a collision on 5 February 1945; May have been re-floated and used as civilian vessel until 1973

General characteristics
- Class & type: MGB 502 Motor gunboat
- Displacement: 95 long tons (97 t)
- Length: 117 ft (36 m)
- Beam: 20 ft 3 in (6.17 m)
- Draught: 4 ft 1 in (1.24 m)
- Propulsion: 3 × Paxman VEE RB engines; 3 × 800 hp = 2400 hp
- Speed: 28 knots (52 km/h) (max.); 25 knots (46 km/h) (cruising)
- Range: 2,000 nautical miles (3,700 km) at 11 kn (20 km/h)
- Complement: 21
- Armament: as intended: 1 × 6 pounder Hotchkiss; 1 × 2 pounder autocannon; 4 × 20 mm Oerlikon cannons (2 twin); 2 × depth charges; after modification: 4 × 20 mm Oerlikon cannons (2 twin); 8 × .303 in Vickers MGs (1 quadruple, 2 twin)

Gay Viking was a blockade runner of the British Merchant Navy. Originally under construction as a Motor Gun Boat, Gay Viking was one of eight vessels that were ordered by the Turkish Navy, but were requisitioned by the Royal Navy to serve with Coastal Forces during the Second World War. Originally intended to be HMMGB 506, the vessel was instead completed as a blockade runner for the Merchant Navy and named Gay Viking. She operated out of Hull on two separate operations to the Scandinavian countries. She was one of the more successful of her group, but was lost in a collision while returning from one of these operations. Reports indicate that she may have been salvaged after this and gone on to sail for a considerable number of years as a civilian vessel.

== Construction ==
Gay Viking was built by Camper and Nicholson as part of an order of eight Motor Gun Boats placed by the Turkish Navy. These were larger than British MGBs and had diesel engines. The outbreak of the Second World War led to the Royal Navy taking over the eight vessels giving them numbers (502–509). The Navy then had completed 504, 505, 506, 507 and 508 as merchant vessels, to take part in Operation Bridford.

The objective of Operation Bridford was to bring back to Britain quantities of ball bearings manufactured by Sweden's SKF. To do this, the vessels would have to reach Sweden by evading the German blockade of the Skagerrak. Once there, the vessels would load the ball bearings and return to Britain. British engineering plants needed the ball bearings, and other specialist equipment manufactured in Sweden and while some supplies were being flown in, the volumes were not sufficient to meet the demand.

The five boats were modified by Camper & Nicholson (3) and Amos and Smith (2) to accommodate cargo: most of the armament were removed, and the bridge moved aft, to make way for an internal cargo bay (45 tons deadweight) amidships. The need to conform to Sweden's neutrality meant that the Royal Navy also had to implement a number of other measures. First, it gave the boats names: 504 became Hopewell, 505 became Nonsuch, 506 became Gay Viking, 507 became Gay Corsair and 508 became Master Standfast. Second, they sailed under the Red Ensign (flag) of the merchant marine. Third, their crews were civilian sailors drawn from Hull trawlermen with officers from Ellerman Lines. The operation was organised and led by a civilian steel expert and former Arctic explorer, Sir George Binney, who was given the rank of Commander in the Royal Naval Volunteer Reserve to give him the required legal status in case he were captured.

Their mission required the vessels to pass between German-occupied territories in waters habitually patrolled by German aircraft and surface vessels. To minimise the risk of detection, the Navy timed the voyages to pass areas of greatest danger during the hours of darkness. This meant that the vessels could only make their journeys during the winter months when the duration of darkness was sufficient to give the ships the time they needed to traverse the patrolled areas.

== Operations ==
The five boats, including Gay Viking, were first deployed in September 1943. The plan was that having arrived at the Swedish port of Lysekil they would load their cargoes, before sailing back to the Humber. Each leg of the journey would take two days.

The first attempt was planned for 23 September, but had to be postponed after problems developed with the boats' engines. It instead took place on 26 October, but was plagued with mechanical problems and bad weather. Gay Viking was the only vessel to make a successful round trip, returning to Britain on 30 October carrying 40 tons of cargo. Further attempts were made, many of them successfully, despite the loss of Master Standfast to the Germans on 2 November, and Nonsuch being rendered inoperable by continuing engine problems that limited her to making only one successful round trip.

Gay Viking eventually made three trips, despite damaging her port engine crankshaft on 17 March 1944. The operation was considered a success, but the trips were brought to an end with the return of the shorter nights in 1944. The voyages were resumed in September 1944 under the name of Operation Moonshine, and involved carrying supplies and munitions to elements of the Danish resistance. Many of these attempts had to be canceled due to poor weather, or recurring difficulties with the Paxman diesel engines. The operation was administered by Captain James Woodeson RA from the Special Operations Executive.

Hopewell, Nonsuch and Gay Corsair all dropped their civilian names and returned to their official designation in 1944. By 1945 the Navy had advanced their numbers to the new numbering scheme and they became No. 2004, 2005 and 2007 respectively. For some reason, Gay Viking apparently continued to sail under that name.

== Loss ==
Three of the vessels, Hopewell (No. 2004), Nonsuch (No. 2005) and Gay Viking were deployed on one Moonshine run in early 1945. While making the return voyage on 5 February 1945, Gay Viking and Hopewell collided. The seamen of the Gay Viking were taken off and she subsequently sank. However she appears to have subsequently been re-floated and returned to service as a civilian vessel. She was sailed under a variety of names and eventually purchased for conversion as a pleasure craft for operation in The Bahamas, under the name Bahama Viking, although the vessel remained in Denmark as late as 1973. The vessel subsequently sank at wharf in Copenhagen, and was broken up for salvage in the 1990s.

== See also ==
- Operation Rubble
