= Göran Djupsund =

Finnish political scientist (1952–2026)

- Born: Göran Erik Djupsund; 30 October 1952; Tampere, Finland
- Died: 1 October 2026 (aged 73); Åland, Finland
- Education: Åbo Akademi University
- Awards: Mauritz Hallberg Prize (1983); Folkbildning Prize (2017)

Göran Erik Djupsund (30 October 1952 – 1 October 2026) was a Finnish political scientist and academic. He served as a professor of political science at Åbo Akademi University Vaasa campus. He also appeared in many Swedish language Finnish television media. In 1983, he was awarded the Mauritz Hallberg Prize, and in 2017, he was awarded the Folkbildning Prize.

== Life and career ==
Göran Erik Djupsund was born in Tampere on 30 October 1952. He studied at Åbo Akademi University and got a degree in doctoral science in 1981. He started his career at Åbo Akademi University as an assistant in political science from 1975 to 1980, and as a research assistant for the Research Council of Finland.

He became a professor in 1986 and became the full professor of political science in 1988. He supervised more than 400 master's theses and 20 doctoral dissertations. He also appeared in many Swedish and Finnish broadcasts, news programs, and news outlets such as Svenska Yle and Ålands Radio and TV. In 2018, he retired from his career both academic and news. He relocated to Åland.

Djupsund died in Åland on 1 October 2026, at the age of 73.
