= Edward Upward =

British writer (1903–2009)

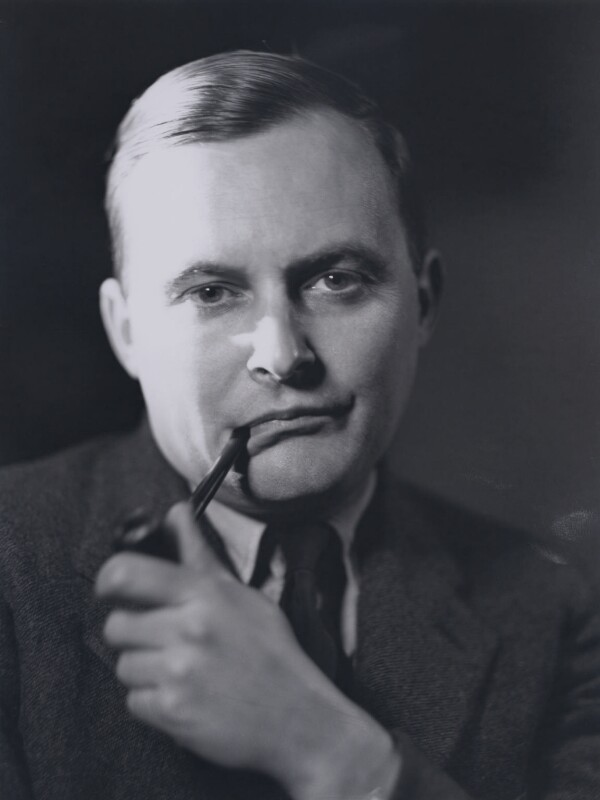
- Upward c. 1938
- Born: 9 September 1903; Romford, Essex, England
- Died: 13 February 2009 (aged 105); Pontefract, West Yorkshire, England
- Education: Corpus Christi College, Cambridge
- Occupations: Writer, schoolteacher
- Spouse: Hilda Percival (m. 1936; died 1995)
- Writing career
- Period: 1920–2003

Edward Falaise Upward, FRSL (9 September 1903 – 13 February 2009) was a British novelist and short story writer who, prior to his death, was believed to be the UK's oldest living author. Initially gaining recognition amongst the Auden Group as a highly imaginative surrealist writer, in the 1930s he joined the Communist Party of Great Britain, after which his writing shifted towards Marxist realism. His literary career spanned over eighty years.

== Early life and education ==
Upward was born on 9 September 1903 in Romford, Essex, where his father had a doctor's surgery. His parents were Harold Arthur Upward (1874–1958), who came from a middle-class family on the Isle of Wight, and Louisa "Isa" Upward (née Jones; 1869–1951), who had trained as a nurse and tried acting. His mother, who had grown up in Wanstead but was of Welsh descent, came from a lower-middle-class background but was very class conscious, a trait Upward strongly disliked. His siblings were John Mervyn Upward (1905–1999); Laurence Vaughan Upward (1909–1970), who had schizophrenia; and Yolande Isa Upward (1911–2004). Another brother, Harold, was born in 1907 and died in infancy that same year. His first cousin once removed was the poet and novelist Allen Upward, who committed suicide in 1926.

In 1917, at the insistence of his mother, Upward was sent to Repton School, where he became a close friend of Christopher Isherwood in the sixth form. Upward's first published material appeared in the school magazine, The Reptonian, in February 1920. From 1922 to 1925 he attended Corpus Christi College, Cambridge, reading History and then English. After the arrival of Isherwood in Cambridge in 1923 the two created the surreal town of Mortmere, an obscene parody and repudiation of the various upper-class characters they encountered at the university. Upward was awarded Cambridge's Chancellor's Medal for English Verse in 1924, for his poem "Buddha". Through Isherwood Upward met and befriended W. H. Auden and Stephen Spender; his first meeting with Auden was at a café in Soho in 1927. Upward is called 'Allen Chalmers' in Isherwood's book Lions and Shadows.

== Teaching and communist activities ==
From January 1926 Upward took up various teaching jobs in a number of locations, such as Carbis Bay, Worcester, Lockerbie, Loretto, Scarborough and Stowe. In 1932 he became an English master at Alleyn's School, Dulwich, having been recommended by a friend of his brother, Mer, who was also a schoolmaster and became headmaster of Port Regis School the following year. He remained at Alleyn's until his retirement in 1961.

In 1931 he began attending meetings of a branch of the Communist Party of Great Britain in Bethnal Green, and canvassed for Joe Vaughan, the CPGB candidate for Bethnal Green South West in that year's general election. In 1932 he joined the party on a probationary basis, which was partly self-imposed, and travelled to the Soviet Union as part of a delegation that also included Barbara Wootton. He also visited Isherwood and Spender in Berlin. He became a full member of the party in 1934. In 1936 he married Hilda Percival (1909–1995), a fellow teacher and CPGB member, with whom he had a son and a daughter (their son, Christopher Upward, became a linguist). During the Second World War the family was evacuated with Upward's school to Cleveleys in Lancashire, where Alleyn's temporarily merged with the nearby Rossall School. Starting in 1942 Upward and his wife began to be investigated by MI5 in relation to their communist activities. Upward remained committed to internationalism and socialism for the rest of his life, although he and Hilda left the CPGB in 1948, believing that it was no longer revolutionary and that its leadership was trying to appease the Labour government.

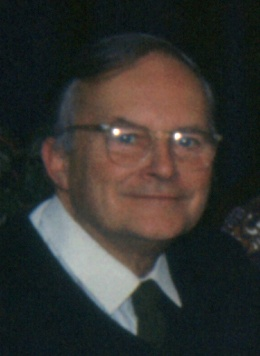
Upward c. 1972

Upward's first novel, Journey to the Border, was published by the Hogarth Press in 1938. It describes in poetic prose the rebellion of a private tutor against his employer and the menacing world of the 1930s, inducing a nightmarish state, and concluding with the recognition that he must join the workers' movement. After this, Upward found it increasingly difficult to write anything, and so in 1952–53 he took a sabbatical year from teaching in order to focus more intently on his writing, but this backfired and resulted in a nervous breakdown. During this time he destroyed most of his Mortmere stories from his Cambridge days, having concluded that such grotesque and fantastical fiction was inappropriate in a post-Holocaust world.

In 1954 Upward began to overcome his creative block and started work on an autobiographical trilogy titled The Spiral Ascent, dealing with the struggle of a poet, Alan Sebrill, to combine his creative endeavours with political commitment to the CPGB. The trilogy was published in the years following Upward's early retirement in 1961 to the house where his parents used to live in Sandown, Isle of Wight. In the Thirties (1962), the first volume, describes Sebrill's early involvement with the CPGB and the struggle against the British Union of Fascists in the 1930s. The Rotten Elements (1969) involves Sebrill and his wife's clash with the party leadership, and their decision to leave the party. The final volume, No Home but the Struggle (1977), sees Sebrill find new meaning by joining the Campaign for Nuclear Disarmament, which helps him to write again. It also includes largely autobiographical recollections of Upward's family and childhood, inspired by Marcel Proust, whom Upward greatly admired.

== Later years ==
In the last decades of the twentieth century Upward returned to writing short stories, which were published, along with reprints of earlier works, by the Enitharmon Press. His last years were also punctuated by sadness, with the deaths of his wife Hilda, in 1995, and his son Christopher, in 2002. In 2003 Enitharmon celebrated his centenary by publishing selected short stories, edited by Alan Walker, as A Renegade in Springtime. He often gave interviews recalling memories of his famous friends. In an interview with Nicholas Wroe, which appeared in The Guardian the month before his hundredth birthday, Upward explained that the title "came from an idea for a story about Auden. I never wrote the story, but the phrase stayed. The renegade is the one with a sense of reality and everyone else is too happy-go-lucky." His last story, "Crommelin-Brown", was written in 2003, shortly before he turned 100.

In 2005 Upward was elected a Fellow of the Royal Society of Literature and awarded its Benson Medal.

On 13 February 2009 Upward died of a chest infection at a care home in Pontefract, West Yorkshire, where he had relocated in 2004 to be close to his daughter. He was 105 years old.

Edward Upward: Art and Life by Peter Stansky was published in May 2016. There are collections of Upward's literary papers and correspondence in the British Library (Add MS 89002) and in the Parker Library of Corpus Christi College, Cambridge.

== Bibliography ==
=== Novels ===
- Journey to the Border (1938; revised ed., 1994)
- In the Thirties (Vol. 1 of The Spiral Ascent, 1962)
- The Rotten Elements (Vol. 2 of The Spiral Ascent, 1969)
- No Home But the Struggle (Vol. 3 of The Spiral Ascent, 1977)

=== Collections of short stories ===
- The Railway Accident and Other Stories (1969)
- The Night Walk and Other Stories (1987)
- The Mortmere Stories by Christopher Isherwood and Edward Upward (1994)
- An Unmentionable Man (1994)
- The Scenic Railway (1997)
- The Coming Day and Other Stories (2000)
- A Renegade in Springtime (2003)

See also Edward Upward: A Bibliography, 1920–2000 by Alan Walker (Enitharmon Press, 2000).

=== Biography and criticism ===
- Mario Faraone, L'isola e il treno: L'opera di Edward Upward tra impegno politico e creatività artistica, Rome: La Sapienza Università Editrice, 2013: in Italian, but with extensive passages quoted in English, a previously unpublished interview with the author, and a bibliography updated to 2012; further details available here
- Peter Stansky, Edward Upward: Art and Life, London: Enitharmon Books, 2016.
