= Hugh Sykes Davies =

English poet

- Born: 17 August 1909; Prescot, Lancashire, England
- Died: 6 June 1984 (aged 74); Cambridge, England
- Education: St John's College, Cambridge
- Occupations: Poet, novelist and critic
- Spouse: Kathleen Raine (div.)
- Writing career
- Genre: Surrealism

Hugh Sykes Davies (17 August 1909 – 6 June 1984) was an English poet, novelist and communist, who was one of a small group of 1930s British surrealists.

== Biography ==
Davies was born in Prescot, Merseyside (then in Lancashire), to a Methodist minister and his wife. He went to Kingswood School, Bath, and read the Classics and English Triposes at St John's College, Cambridge, where he co-edited the student magazine Experiment with William Empson. Following graduation he was awarded both the Jebb Studentship and the Le Bas Essay Prize. In 1933 he was elected the first-ever fellow of English at St John's College, and three years later he was appointed a University Lecturer in the subject. While at Cambridge he was a member of the Apostles and befriended the philosopher Ludwig Wittgenstein.

Davies spent some time in Paris during the 1930s, and in 1936 he was one of the organisers of the London International Surrealist Exhibition, where he met the artist Salvador Dalí. His poems were mostly published in avant garde magazines and were not collected during his lifetime; his best known was arguably Petron (1935). His novels include Full Fathom Five (1956) and The Papers of Andrew Melmoth (1960), while his works of literary scholarship include Realism in the Drama (his prize-winning entry for the Le Bas competition; 1933), Surrealism (1936), Macaulay's Marginalia to Lucretius (1937) and Grammar Without Tears (1951).

Politically Davies was of the left, and he intended to stand as the Labour Party candidate for Isle of Ely in the anticipated 1940 general election, but his prospective candidature was terminated when the party found out that he was also a member of the Communist Party. During World War II he was employed at the Ministry of Food, which gave him an insight into administrative problems; perhaps consequently, he lost much of his youthful utopianism, and in the 1950s renounced his communist affiliation and reverted to a more orthodox social democracy in its stead.

== Personal life ==
Davies had a talent for friendship, and in addition to Empson and Dalí he numbered T. S. Eliot, I. A. Richards, Anthony Blunt and Ludwig Wittgenstein amongst his circle. At one stage he had Malcolm Lowry declared his ward in an attempt to stop Lowry's drinking. He appears in the National Film Board of Canada's feature-length documentary Volcano: An Inquiry into the Life and Death of Malcolm Lowry (1976), where he talks about Lowry and their friendship.

Davies died at St John's College in Cambridge on 6 June 1984, after recovering several months earlier from a serious operation. He was married five times to four women, the first of whom was the poet Kathleen Raine.
