= Kathleen Raine =

English poet, critic and scholar (1908–2003)

Kathleen Raine CBE
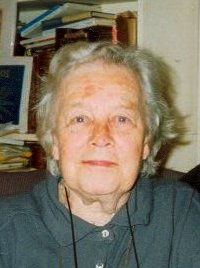
- Raine in 1991
- Born: Kathleen Jessie Raine; 14 June 1908; Ilford, Essex
- Died: 6 July 2003 (aged 95); London
- Education: Girton College, Cambridge
- Occupation: poet
- Spouses: Hugh Sykes Davies; Charles Madge
- Children: 2
- Awards: 1970 Cholmondeley Award; 1992 Queen's Gold Medal for Poetry; 2000 CBE; 2000 Commandeurs of the Ordre des Arts et des Lettres

Kathleen Jessie Raine CBE (14 June 1908 – 6 July 2003) was an English poet, critic and scholar, writing in particular on William Blake, W. B. Yeats and Thomas Taylor. Known for her interest in various forms of spirituality, most prominently Platonism and Neoplatonism, she was a founding member of the Temenos Academy.

== Life ==
Kathleen Raine was born in Ilford, Essex, the only child of schoolmaster and Methodist lay preacher George Raine, from Wingate, County Durham, and Jessie (née Wilkie), a Scot who spoke Scots as her first language. The Raines had met as students at Armstrong College in Newcastle upon Tyne. Raine spent part of World War I, 'a few short years', with her Aunty Peggy Black at the manse in Great Bavington, Northumberland. She commented, "I loved everything about it". For her it was an idyllic world and is the declared foundation of all her poetry. Raine always remembered Northumberland as Eden: "In Northumberland I knew myself in my own place; and I never 'adjusted' myself to any other or forgot what I had so briefly but clearly seen and understood and experienced." This period is described in the first book of her autobiography, Farewell Happy Fields (1973).

Raine noted that poetry was deeply ingrained in the daily lives of her maternal ancestors: "On my mother's side I inherited Scotland's songs and ballads…sung or recited by my mother, aunts and grandmothers, who had learnt it from their mothers and grandmothers… Poetry was the very essence of life." Raine heard and read the Bible daily at home and at school, coming to know much of it by heart. Her father was an English master at County High School in Ilford. He had studied the poetry of Wordsworth for his M.Litt. thesis and had a passion for Shakespeare and Raine saw many Shakespearean plays as a child. From her father she gained a love of etymology and the literary aspect of poetry, the counterpart to her immersion in the poetic oral traditions. She wrote that for her poetry was "not something invented but given…Brought up as I was in a household where poets were so regarded it naturally became my ambition to be a poet". She confided her ambition to her father who was sceptical of the plan. "To my father" she wrote "poets belonged to a higher world, to another plane; to say one wished to become a poet was to him something like saying one wished to write the fifth gospel". Her mother encouraged Raine's poetry from infancy.

Raine was educated at County High School, Ilford, and then read natural sciences, including botany and zoology, on an Exhibition at Girton College, Cambridge, receiving her master's degree in 1929. While in Cambridge she met Jacob Bronowski, William Empson, Humphrey Jennings and Malcolm Lowry. In later life she was a friend and colleague of the kabbalist author and teacher, Z'ev ben Shimon Halevi.

Raine married Hugh Sykes Davies in 1930. She left Davies for Charles Madge and they had two children together, but their marriage also broke up as a result of Charles' affair with Inez Pearn, at that time married to the poet Stephen Spender. She also held an unrequited passion for Gavin Maxwell. The title of Maxwell's most famous book Ring of Bright Water, subsequently made into a film of the same name starring Bill Travers and Virginia McKenna, was taken from a line in Raine's poem "The Marriage of Psyche". The relationship with Maxwell ended in 1956 when Raine lost his pet otter, Mijbil, indirectly causing the animal's death. Raine held herself responsible, not only for losing Mijbil but for a curse she had uttered shortly beforehand, frustrated by Maxwell's homosexuality: "Let Gavin suffer in this place as I am suffering now." Raine blamed herself thereafter for all Maxwell's misfortunes, beginning with Mijbil's death and ending with the cancer from which he died in 1969. From 1939 to 1941, Raine and her children shared a house at 49a Wordsworth Street in Penrith with Janet Adam Smith and Michael Roberts and later lived in Martindale. She was a friend of Winifred Nicholson.

Raine's two children were Anna Hopwell Madge (born 1934) and James Wolf Madge (1936–2006). In 1959, James married Jennifer Alliston, the daughter of Jane Drew and James Alliston - Raine's friends, both of whom were architects. James Wolf Madge then went on to marry Victoria Watson, a professor of architecture.

At the time of her death, following an accident, Raine lived in London. She died of pneumonia after being knocked over by a reversing car after having posted a letter.

== Works ==
Her first book of poetry, Stone And Flower (1943), was published by Tambimuttu, and illustrated by Barbara Hepworth. In 1946 the collection, Living in Time, was released, followed by The Pythoness in 1949. Her Collected Poems (2000) drew from eleven previous volumes of poetry. Her classics include Who Are We? There were many subsequent prose and poetry works, including her scholarly masterwork, the two-volume Blake and Tradition that was published in 1969 and derived from the A.W. Mellon Lectures that she delivered at the National Gallery of Art in Washington D.C in 1968. Raine was the first woman lecturer in the history of the series and her research demonstrated the antiquity, coherence and integrity of William Blake's philosophy, refuting T S Eliot's assertion to the contrary (Collected Essays, 1932).

The story of her life is told in a three-volume autobiography notable for the author's attempts to impose a structure on her memories that is quasi mythical, thus relating her own life to a larger pattern. This reflects patterns in her poetry, influenced by W. B. Yeats. The three books were originally published separately and later brought together in a single volume, entitled Autobiographies (in conscious imitation of Yeats), edited by Lucien Jenkins.

Raine made translations of Honoré de Balzac's Cousine Bette (Cousin Bette, 1948) and Illusions perdues (Lost Illusions, 1951).

She was a frequent contributor to the quarterly journal Studies in Comparative Religion, which dealt with religious symbolism and the Traditionalist perspective. With Keith Critchlow, Brian Keeble and Philip Sherrard she co-founded, in 1981, Temenos, a periodical, and later, in 1990, the Temenos Academy of Integral Studies, a teaching academy that stressed a multi-stranded universalist philosophy, and in support of her generally Platonist and Neoplatonist views on poetry and culture. She studied Thomas Taylor and published a selection of his works.

Raine was a research fellow at Girton College from 1955 to 1961. She taught at Harvard for at least one course about Myth and Literature offered to teachers and professors in the summer. She also spoke on Yeats and Blake and other topics at the Yeats School in Sligo, Ireland in the summer of 1974. A professor at Cambridge and the author of a number of scholarly books, she was an expert on Coleridge, Blake, and Yeats.

The contemporary composer David Matthews has written a song-cycle, The Golden Kingdom, on some of Raine's poems. Richard Rodney Bennett's Spells (1974–75), a work for soprano, chorus, and large orchestra, is set to texts by Raine.

== Honours ==
Raine received honorary doctorates from universities in the United Kingdom, France and the United States and won numerous awards and honors, including the Edna St. Vincent Millay Prize from the American Poetry Society (date unknown), and also:

- 1952 Harriet Monroe Memorial Prize
- 1953 Arts Council Award
- 1961 Oscar Blumenthal Prize
- 1970 Cholmondeley Award
- 1972 Smith Literary Award
- 1976 Warton Lecture on English Poetry
- 1992 Queen's Gold Medal for Poetry
- 2000 Order of the British Empire, Commander
- 2000 L'Ordre des Arts et des Lettres, Commandeur

== Bibliography ==
=== Poetry collections ===
- Stone and Flower, Nicholson and Watson, 1943
- Living in Time, Editions Poetry London, 1946
- The Pythoness, and other poems, H. Hamilton, 1949
- The Year One: Poems, H. Hamilton, 1952
- Collected poems, H. Hamilton, 1956
- The Hollow Hill: and other poems, 1960–1964, H. Hamilton, 1965
- Six Dreams, and other poems, Enitharmon, 1968
- Penguin Modern Poets 17 (David Gascoyne, W.S. Graham, Kathleen Raine), Penguin, 1970
- Lost Country, Dolmen Press, 1971
- On a Deserted Shore, Dolmen Press, 1973. En una desierta orilla Trad. de R. Martínez Nadal. M., Hiperión, 1981.
- The Oval Portrait, and other poems, Enitharmon Press, 1977
- The Oracle in the Heart, and other poems, 1975–1978, Dolmen Press/G. Allen & Unwin, 1980
- Collected poems, 1935–1980, Allen & Unwin, 1981
- The Presence: Poems, 1984–87, Golgonooza Press, 1987
- Selected Poems, Golgonooza Press, 1988
- Living with Mystery: Poems 1987-91, Golgonooza Press, 1992
- The Collected Poems of Kathleen Raine, Golgonooza Press, 2000
- The Collected Poems of Kathleen Raine, Faber and Faber, 2019 (pbk.)

=== Prose ===
- Defending Ancient Springs, 1967
- Thomas Taylor the Platonist. Selected Writings, Raine, K. and Harper, G.M., eds., Bollingen Series 88, London: Routledge & Kegan Paul, 1969 (also pub. Princeton University, USA)
- Blake and Tradition, 2 Volumes, Routledge & Kegan Paul, 1969
- William Blake, The World of Art Library - Artists, Arts Book Society, Thames and Hudson, London, 1970 (216 pp, 156 illustrations)
- Yeats, the Tarot and the Golden Dawn, Dolmen Press, 1973
- The Inner Journey of the Poet, Golgonooza Press, 1976
- Cecil Collins: Painter of Paradise, Golgonooza Press, 1979
- From Blake to a Vision, Dolmen Press, 1979
- Blake and the New Age, George Allen and Unwin, 1979
- Blake and Antiquity, Routledge & Kegan Paul, 1979 (an abbreviation of the 1969 Blake and Tradition; republished in 2002 by Routledge Classics with a new introduction by Raine)
- The Human Face of God: William Blake and the Book of Job, Thames and Hudson, 1982
- The Inner Journey of the Poet, and other papers, ed. Brian Keeble, Allen & Unwin, 1982
- Yeats the Initiate, George Allen & Unwin, 1987
- W.B. Yeats and the Learning of the Imagination, Golgonooza Press, 1999.
- Seeing God Everywhere: Essays on Nature and the Sacred, World Wisdom, 2004 (contributed essay)
- The Betrayal of Tradition: Essays on the Spiritual Crisis of Modernity, World Wisdom, 2005 (contributed essay)
- That Wondrous Pattern: Essays on Poetry and Poets, Counterpoint Press, 2017
- These Bright Shadows: The Poetry of Kathleen Raine, by Brian Keeble. A pioneering study of the poetic imagination of Kathleen Raine. (Angelico Press, 2020)

=== Autobiography ===
- Farewell Happy Fields, Hamilton/G. Braziller, 1974
- The Land Unknown, Hamilton/G. Braziller, 1975
- The Lion's Mouth, Hamilton/G. Braziller, 1977. autob.
- India Seen Afar, Green Books/G. Braziller, 1990
- Autobiographies, ed. Lucien Jenkins, Skoob Books, 1991

=== Biography ===
No End to Snowdrops, Philippa Bernard. Shepheard-Walwyn (Publishers) Ltd, 2009, ISBN 978-0-85683-268-0

== Musical settings ==
- The End of Love (1954), a song cycle by Geoffrey Bush, includes four settings: 'Lament', 'Far-darting Apollo', 'The End of Love' and 'Introspection'. The songs have been recorded.
- A Spell For Creation was set by Mike Oldfield in the soundtrack for the documentary film The Space Movie (1979). A Spell For Creation was dropped from the 1978 Incantations album release, but the full version was provided for The Space Movie soundtrack, though it is barely audible. Enthusiasts have since processed the soundtrack so that it can now be clearly heard.
- Remembered Music (1988) by Nicholas Simpson, for string quartet with soprano soloist, sets a section of text from Raine's On a Deserted Shore.
- Nigel Butterley’s compositions The Woven Light (1994) for soprano and orchestra, Paradise Unseen (2001) for choir, and the oratorio Spell of Creation (2001) are settings of Raine’s poetry.
- Who stands at the door in the storm and rain from The Year One: Poems (1952) was set by Tarik O'Regan for unaccompanied chorus in 2006 with the title Threshold of Night; it was first recorded on the 2008 album of the same name.
- The song-cycle On a Deserted Shore by Joseph Phibbs was written and performed for the Temenos Academy in 2012 to texts by Kathleen Raine.

== See also ==
- Temenos Academy Review
