= Birmingham Film Society =

The Birmingham Film Society was a film society established in Birmingham, England in 1931 to give local audiences "the opportunity to see films of importance… which they ordinarily find difficult or impossible to see."

Its founders were two Birmingham City Council clerks, one of who was Stanley Hawes, who would later become a notable film producer and director. Its first screening took place on 18 January 1931 at the Hampton Cinema on Livery Street, near Snow Hill station. It later moved to the West End Cinema in Suffolk Street, and then the Scala on Smallbrook Street. The society was very popular - by 1934 it had 543 members; by 1939 this had increased to 738.

The Film Society was an important meeting point for the artistic and literary circles of 1930s Birmingham. The author Walter Allen noted that "It was in the Film Society more than anywhere else that young artists came together". Members included E. R. Dodds and Philip Sargeant Florence who were both presidents of the society.

Conroy Maddox described the importance of the society to the Birmingham Surrealists: "Evenings were spent in talk with Robert and John Melville, the poet Henry Reed (poet), and Dorothy Baker. On Sundays we would go to the Film Society and saw for the first time the works of Eisenstein, Cocteau, Pudovkin, Fritz Lang and others. Afterwards we would talk either about the film or more imaginatively."
