= Birmingham Artists Committee =

The Birmingham Artists Committee was an English artist collective that organised exhibitions of painting and sculpture in Birmingham between 1947 and 1952.

The committee was organised by the art critic Robert Melville and artists including Oscar Mellor and Trevor Denning to break the stranglehold of the conservative Royal Birmingham Society of Artists on the exhibition of work by living artists in the city.

Its exhibitions were an important post-war outlet for the Birmingham Surrealists, showing the work of Conroy Maddox, John Melville, Emmy Bridgwater and the young Desmond Morris. Other notable artists represented included CoBrA member William Gear and the sculptor Gordon Herickx.

Although there was no organisational link, The Birmingham Artists Committee was acknowledged as a catalyst by the artists who founded the Ikon Gallery in 1964.
