= Jacques Brunius =

French actor and director (1906–1967)

- Born: September 16, 1906; Paris, France
- Died: April 24, 1967 (aged 60); Exeter, United Kingdom
- Known for: Actor, director and writer
- Spouse: Cecile Chevreau (married 1951)
- Children: 1

Jacques B. Brunius (born Jacques Henri Cottance, 16 September 1906 – 24 April 1967) was a French actor, director and writer, who was born in Paris and died in Exeter, UK. He was cremated in Sidmouth, with a tribute by Mesens.

Assistant director to Luis Buñuel on L'Âge d'or, he appeared in more than 30 movies, using several alternate names: Jacques Borel, J.B. Brunius, Jacques-Bernard Brunius, Jacques Brunius, Brunius, J.B.Brunius. He acted in many of the early, more political, movies of his friend Jean Renoir. During World War II he broadcast from England to France over Radio Londres. He married French-English actress Cecile Chevreau in 1951. Their son Richard was born in 1956.

Member of the surrealist group in France and then in England, with his friends E.L.T. Mesens, Conroy Maddox, Ithell Colquhoun, Simon Watson Taylor and Roland Penrose. Brunius attacked Toni del Renzio, who was married to Colquhoun and who was attempting to reanimate an inactive English group in 1942–3. Brunius co-signed the tract Idolatry and Confusion, which condemned and mocked del Renzio. In reality, Mesens feared a takeover of the group leadership by del Renzio.

He never missed an opportunity to defend surrealism, and participated in many radio shows. In 1959, he undertook a vigorous defense of the poetic value of nursery rhymes.

The text was published by John Lyle in Transforma(c)tion n°7 under the title "Language and Lore of Children".

== Filmography ==
=== Actor ===
- 1930: L'Âge d'or (a.k.a. The Golden Age), dir. Luis Buñuel.... Passer-by in the street (uncredited)
- 1932: L'affaire est dans le sac (a.k.a. It's in the Bag), dir. Pierre Prévert .... Adrien, le client au béret (as J.B.Brunius)
- 1934: L'Hôtel du libre échange .... Le monsieur du train
- 1936: Le Crime de Monsieur Lange (a.k.a. The Crime of Monsieur Lange), dir. Jean Renoir (as J.B. Brunius) .... Mr. Baigneur
- 1936: Moutonnet
- 1936: Partie de campagne (a.k.a. A Day in the Country), dir. Jean Renoir (as Jacques Borel) .... Rodolphe
- 1936: La Vie est à nous (a.k.a. Life Belongs to Us) .... Le président du conseil d'administration
- 1937: Le Temps des cerises (a.k.a. The Time of the Cherries) (as Jacques-Bernard Brunius) .... Le petit-fils du directeur
- 1938: Le Schpountz (a.k.a. Heartbeat), dir. Marcel Pagnol .... L'Accessoiriste
- 1938: La Bête humaine (a.k.a. Judas Was a Woman, The Human Beast), dir. Jean Renoir (uncredited) .... Un garçon de ferme
- 1940: The Mondesir Heir .... Le médecin
- 1950: The Wooden Horse .... André (as Jacques Brunius)
- 1951: The Dream of Andalusia (uncredited)
- 1951: Andalousie(uncredited)
- 1951: The Changing face of Europe .... Narrator, as himself
- 1951: Une fille à croquer (a.k.a. Good Enough to Eat, Le Petit Chaperon Rouge) (as Jacques Borel)
- 1951: The Lavender Hill Mob, dir Charles Crichton (as Jacques Brunius) .... Customs Official
- 1952: 24 Hours of a Woman's Life (a.k.a. Affair in Monte Carlo).... Concierge, Pension Lisa (as Jacques Brunius)
- 1953: South of Algiers (a.k.a. The Golden Mask) .... Kress (as Jacques Brunius)
- 1953: Sea Devils .... Fouche
- 1953: Always a Bride .... Inspector (as Jacques Brunius)
- 1953: Laughing Anne (a.k.a. Between the Tides) .... Frenchie
- 1954: Forbidden Cargo .... Det. Pierre Valance - French police
- 1955: To Paris with Love .... Monsieur Marconne
- 1955: Captain Gallant of the Foreign Legion (a.k.a. Foreign Legionnaire) (TV, 1 episode) .... Pakka
- 1955: The Cockleshell Heroes .... French Fisherman (as Jacques Brunius)
- 1955: Barbie (TV, 1 episode) .... Mr. Morrisot
- 1956: Wicked as They Come (a.k.a. Portrait in Smoke) .... Inspector Caron
- 1956: House of Secrets (a.k.a. Triple Deception) .... Lessage
- 1957: True as a Turtle (a.k.a. Plain Sailing) .... Monsieur Charbonnier
- 1957: Dangerous Exile .... De Chassagne (uncredited)
- 1958: Orders to Kill .... Cmndt. Morand
- 1960: The Miracle of St. Phillipe (TV episode) .... The Mayor
- 1960: The Four Just Men (TV, 1 episode) .... The Mayor
- 1961: Mon frère Jacques (TV), dir. Pierre Prévert .... himself
- 1961: The Greengage Summer (a.k.a. Loss of Innocence) .... M. Joubert
- 1964: The Yellow Rolls-Royce .... Duc d'Angoulême (England) (uncredited)
- 1965: Le Chant du monde (a.k.a. Song of the World) (as Jacques Borel)
- 1965: Return from the Ashes .... 1st Detective (uncredited)

=== Director ===
- 1936: La Vie est à nous (a.k.a. The People of France) (also as writer and editor)
- 1939: Violons d'Ingres (also as writer and editor)
- 1953: The Blakes Slept Here
- 1951: The Changing Face of Europe (3rd segment: "Somewhere to Live")
- 1952: To The Rescue
- 1952: Brief City

=== Assistant director ===
- 1930: L'Âge d'or (a.k.a. The Golden Age), dir. Luis Buñuel.
- 1929: Le Requin

=== Radio Producer ===
- 1954 February 7 : Le docteur Miracle, two operas by Bizet and Lecocq, BBC Third Programme
- 1966 Christmas Day : Special Day on Lewis Carroll, France Culture
