= Gordon Herickx =

English sculptor

- Born: 1900
- Died: 1953; Birmingham, England
- Known for: Sculpture

Gordon Herickx (1900–1953) was an English sculptor.

== Biography ==
Born in Birmingham, one of seven children of gem setter Emile Herickx and his wife Martha, Herickx won a scholarship in 1914 to study under William Bloye at the Birmingham School of Art, completing his studies after World War I. He assisted Bloye on projects such as the 1933 carvings of the church of St. Francis of Assisi, Bournville, and executed his own commissions, such as the carvings around the entrance to the Barber Institute of Fine Arts, from his studio in Moseley. Herickx taught at the Walsall College of Art from 1945 until his death.

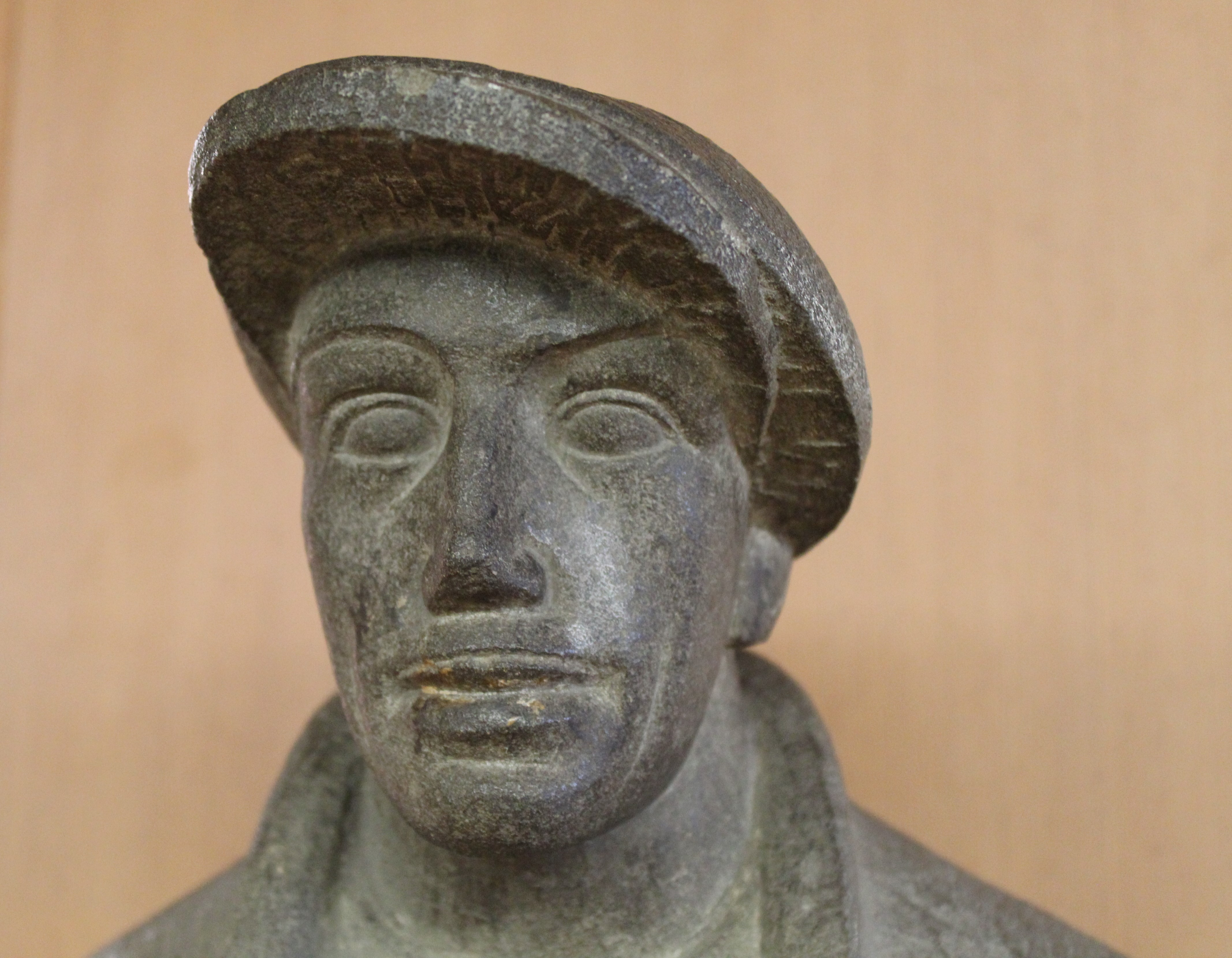
An Unemployed Man, detail of a stone sculpture by Herickx

Herickx worked mainly in cast bronze or carved Hopton Wood Stone or Hornton stone, working slowly and destroying work he considered imperfect. His early pieces included a series of biomorphic abstractions of corn, cyclamen and chestnut buds completed in the 1930s, with later work including a series of figure studies made in the 1950s. Aside from Bloye his sculpture showed the influence of Constantin Brâncuși and Eric Gill.

Herickx's first solo exhibition was held in London in July 1953, but he died in Birmingham the night after the show's opening. A memorial exhibition was held in October–November that year in Birmingham Museum & Art Gallery.

Herickx's friends in Birmingham included the Birmingham Group of writers and poets and the Birmingham surrealist painters Conroy Maddox and John Melville. The poet Louis MacNeice included Herickx as the character "Wimbush" in his autobiographical poem Autumn Sequel.

== See also ==
- Birmingham Artists Committee
