= Treasure House Fair =

Annual art and antiques fair in London, United Kingdom

- Frequency: Annually
- Locations: London, United Kingdom, England
- Years active: June 2023 – present
- Inaugurated: 22 June 2023; 3 years ago
- Founder: Harry van der Hoorn, Thomas Woodham-Smith
- Most recent: 25 – 30 June 2026
- Next event: 23 – 29 June 2027
- Website: treasurehousefair.com

The Treasure House Fair is an annual art and antiques fair in London, United Kingdom, showcasing paintings, antiquities, jewellery and antique furniture. First organised in 2023, the fair is held on the grounds of the Royal Hospital, Chelsea in late June-early July.

== History ==
Following the cancellation of Masterpiece London in 2023, Harry van der Hoorn and Thomas Woodham-Smith founded Treasure House Fair, known briefly as the London Summer Art Fair, to take place at the same time as the discontinued fair. The first edition of the fair took place in June 2023 with approximately 55 exhibitors, around 70 exhibitors in 2024, and 74 exhibitors exhibiting in the 2025 edition.

== Exhibitions ==
In 2024, the Fair hosted an exhibition of large gemstones titled "The Great One Hundred-Carat Gems". In 2025, the exhibition focused on "The Brilliant Bugattis", featuring works by Carlo Bugatti, Rembrandt Bugatti and Ettore Bugatti, including a Bugatti Type 39.

In 2026, the special exhibition was in collaboration with Southampton City Art Gallery, presenting works from their surrealist collection. This was to coincide with the 90th anniversary of the London International Surrealist Exhibition which took place in 1936. Artists whose works were presented in the exhibition included Roland Penrose, Paul Nash, Eileen Agar, Ithell Colquhoun, Edith Rimmington and Paul Delvaux.

== Notable exhibitors ==
Notable exhibitors include A La Vieille Russie, Wartski, Philip Mould & Company, The Sladmore Gallery, Apollo, and Turquoise Mountain Foundation.
