= Emmy Bridgwater =

British artist (1906–1999)

Emma Frith Bridgwater (10 November 1906 – 13 March 1999), known as Emmy Bridgwater, was an English artist and poet associated with the Surrealist movement.

Based at times in both Birmingham and London, she was a significant member of the Birmingham Surrealists and of the London-based British Surrealist Group, and was an important link between the surrealists of the two cities.

Michel Remy, professor of art history at the University of Nice and author of Surrealism in Britain, describes her influence as "of the same importance to British surrealism as the arrival of Dalí in the ranks of the French surrealists".

== Biography ==
Emmy Bridgwater was born in the upmarket Edgbaston district of Birmingham, the third daughter of a chartered accountant and Methodist. Showing an early interest in painting and drawing, she studied under Bernard Fleetwood-Walker at the Birmingham School of Art for three years from 1922 before further study at a local art school in Oxford paid for by work as a secretary.

Bridgwater's career was hindered by her geographical location, income, and class. She had limited contact with the London Surrealist Group, and her father's limited financial support only allowed her to attend the Grosvenor School of Modern Art intermittently. Due to her limited income, Bridgwater was forced to undertake secretarial work while working as an artist and was unable to travel to Paris until after the War.

Emmy Bridgwater, Necessary Bandages (1942), oil on panel

Bridgwater's aesthetic direction was transformed by attending the London International Surrealist Exhibition in 1936, where she met Conroy Maddox, John Melville and Robert Melville - the key figures of the Birmingham Surrealists. From this point on her work began to explore the more fearful sides of the subconscious, often using automatist techniques. Studying for periods at the Grosvenor School of Modern Art in London during 1936 and 1937 she retained a base in Birmingham and exhibited as a member of the Birmingham Group throughout the late 1930s, also exhibiting at the London Gallery after being introduced to owner E. L. T. Mesens by Robert Melville.

In early 1940, she joined the British Surrealist Group when Conroy Maddox and Robert Melville officially introduced her to them. She was to attend their meetings for much of the following decade. Forming a close friendship with Edith Rimmington and having a brief but intense affair with Toni del Renzio, she contributed to numerous international surrealist publications (including del Renzio's Arson: an ardent review) and held her first solo exhibition at Jack Bilbo's Modern Gallery in 1942. In 1947, Bridgwater was one of six English artists chosen by André Breton to exhibit at the Exposition Internationale du Surrealisme at the Galerie Maeght in Paris - the last major international surrealist group exhibition.

By the late 1940s, however, Bridgwater was having to spend increasing amounts of time caring for her ageing mother and disabled sister. In 1953, she moved to Stratford-upon-Avon to take on this responsibility full-time and effectively suspended her artistic career.

During the 1970s Bridgwater resumed work, largely in collage, and her earlier work featured in numerous surrealist retrospective exhibitions over the following decades. Ceasing work in the mid-1980s, she died in Solihull in 1999.

== Work ==
Emmy Bridgwater's work in the 1930s and 1940s largely consisted of paintings and pen and ink drawings. She is recognized in surrealism as an automatist. Her personal iconography often featured organic imagery such as birds, eggs, leaves, fruit and tendril-like automatist lines depicted with a sense of "surrealist black humour and violence", often within a dreamlike landscape. From the 1970s onwards she also worked in collage. While Bridgwater is primarily known as a painter, collagist, and graphic artist, she was also a poet. In 1946, she contributed to Free Unions Libres, a collection of texts by French and English surrealists and edited by Simon Watson Taylor.

== Critical reaction ==
Emmy Bridgwater, Night Work is About to Commence (1943), Oil on board.

In Arson: an ardent review Toni del Renzio wrote of Bridgwater's paintings: "We do not see these pictures. We hear their cries and are moved by them. Our own entrails are drawn painfully from us and twisted into the pictures whose significance we did not want to realize."

Robert Melville described Bridgwater's paintings as depicting "the saddening, half-seen 'presences' encountered by the artist on her journey through the labyrinths of good and evil ... although they are dreamlike in their ambiguity they are realistic documents from a region of phantasmal hopes and murky desires where few stay to observe and fewer still remain clear-sighted."

Her obituary in The Independent said "Her paintings show an ability to enter a personal dream world and transform the visions she experienced there into bold, unselfconscious, emotionally charged landscapes which more often than not strike into the very depths of one's mind. Using a limited palette and painting thickly, she was able to bring together seemingly unrelated objects which she used to fill desolate landscapes, giving the paintings a narrative quality of her own making."

== Exhibitions ==
Emmy Bridgwater, Untitled (1941), Pen and ink on paper

- 1937 - The Birmingham Group, Lucy Wertheim Gallery, London
- 1938 - The Birmingham Group, Birmingham Museum and Art Gallery, Birmingham
- 193? - London Gallery, London
- 1939 - As We See Ourselves, Chapman Galleries, Birmingham
- 1942 - Emmy Bridgwater (Solo Exhibition), Modern Gallery, London
- 1947 - Coventry Art Circle Exhibition, Coventry
- 1947 - Exposition Internationale du Surrealisme, Galerie Maeght, Paris
- 1948 - Coventry Art Circle Exhibition, Coventry
- 1949 - Birmingham Artists Committee Invitation Exhibition, Royal Birmingham Society of Artists, Birmingham
- 1951 - Coventry Art Circle Exhibition, Coventry
- 1971 - Britain's Contribution to Surrealism of the 30s and 40s, Hamet Gallery, London
- 1982 - Peinture Surrealiste en Angleterre 1930-1960: Les Enfants d'Alice, Galerie 1900-2000, Paris
- 1985 - A Salute to British Surrealism 1930-1950, The Minories, Colchester; Blond Fine Art, London and Ferens Art Gallery, Hull
- 1985 - British Woman Surrealists, Blond Fine Art, London
- 1986 - Surrealism in England 1936 and after, Herbert Read Gallery, Canterbury
- 1986 - Contrariwise, Surrealism in Britain 1930-1936, Glynn Vivian Art Gallery, Swansea
- 1986 - Surrealism in Britain in the Thirties: Angels of Anarchy and Machines for Making Clouds, Leeds City Art Gallery, Leeds
- 1987 - Surrealismi, Retretti Art Centre, Suomi, Finland
- 1988 - I Surrealisti, Palazzo Reale, Milan, Italy
- 1989 - Die Surrealisten, Schirn Kunsthalle, Frankfurt, Germany
- 1989 - British Surrealism, Blond Fine Art, London
- 1990 - Emmy Bridgwater, Blond Fine Art, London
- 1991 - The Birmingham Surrealist Group, John Bonham Murray Feely Fine Art, London
- 1992 - Ten Decades - Ten Women Artists born 1897-1906, Norwich Gallery
- 1992 - The Foundations of Behaviour, John Bonham Murray Feely Fine Art, London
- 1995 - Real Surreal: British and European Surrealism, Wolverhampton Art Gallery
- 1996 - Emmy Bridgwater/Conroy Maddox: The Last Surrealists, Blond Fine Art, London
- 1996 - The Inner Eye, National Touring Exhibition

== Bibliography ==
Michel Remy (1997), ‘Emmy Bridgwater poète et peintre présentée par Michel Remy’ (with translations of twelve poems), Pleine Marge, 26 (December 1997), pp. 25–55. ISSN: 1255-1619

Lisa Rüll (2022), ‘Lost and Found: Family, Mythology and Emmy Bridgwater’, Emmy Bridgwater: The Edge of Beyond, Exh.cat., The Mayor Gallery, London, 1 December 2022 – 27 January 2023, pp. 20–41. ISBN 978-0-7093-0235-3

Ruth Millington (2022), ‘Emmy Bridgwater: A Surrealist State of Mind’, Emmy Bridgwater: The Edge of Beyond, Exh.cat., The Mayor Gallery, London, 1 December 2022 – 27 January 2023, pp. 5–9. ISBN 978-0-7093-0235-3

Tor Scott (2022), ‘Emmy Bridgwater and “The Spaces Where Swallows Try Their Turns”’, Emmy Bridgwater: The Edge of Beyond, Exh.cat., The Mayor Gallery, London, 1 December 2022 – 27 January 2023, pp. 11–19. ISBN 978-0-7093-0235-3

Silvano Levy (2026), Emmy Bridgwater: Surrealism of Angst (Paul Holberton Publishing, London), 208pp. ISBN 978-1-913645-99-1

== Commemoration ==
A blue plaque commemorating Bridgwater was unveiled at Birmingham Museum and Art Gallery by Birmingham Civic Society and then attached to her birthplace and former home in Lee Crescent, Edgbaston in August 2019.
