= Oscar Mellor =

English painter

Oscar Mellor (7 June 1921, Manchester – 24 October, 2005, Exmouth) was an English surrealist artist and photographer. An associate of the Birmingham Surrealists in the 1940s, he founded the Fantasy Press after his move to Oxford in 1948, publishing works by university poets who emerged into prominence during the 1960s. Although best remembered for the latter, he saw himself primarily as an artist whose business activities existed to support his painting.

== Biography ==
Oscar Mellor was born and educated in Manchester, moving to Birmingham with his family in 1939 and serving as a fighter pilot in the Royal Air Force during World War II. He had painted his first surrealist watercolour at 15 and took up art on returning from the war in 1946, studying part-time at the Birmingham School of Art and later at the Ruskin School of Drawing and Fine Art.

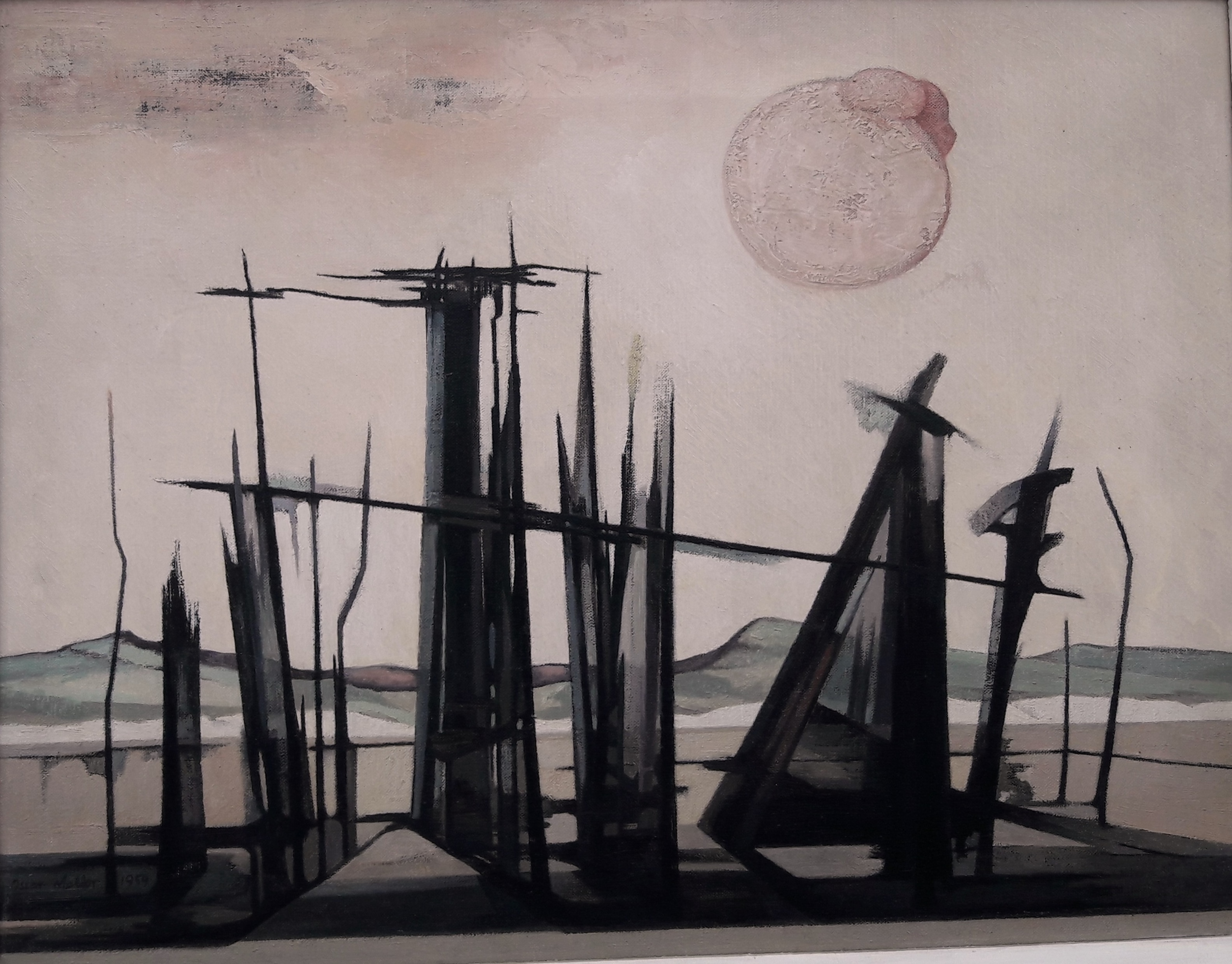
Surreal beachscape, oil painting by Oscar Mellor, 1959

In Birmingham he became an associate of Conroy Maddox and took part in activities of the Birmingham Surrealists. In 1947 he was a founder member of the Birmingham Artists Committee - which existed to organise exhibitions of avant-garde artists ignored by the conservative Royal Birmingham Society of Artists - exhibiting with them alongside artists such as John Melville, William Gear, Emmy Bridgwater and Desmond Morris between 1947 and 1951.

Moving to Oxford in 1948 to continue his studies, he established himself as a publisher and photographer in Swinford, Oxfordshire, founding the Fantasy Press in 1951 and producing regular photographic work for Oxford Playhouse. Among his subjects at that time were the young Prunella Scales and Sean Connery. Mellor was also an illustrator, accompanying a translation of Ovid's Amores that he published in 1954 with line drawings of female nudes, aimed at the gift market. Later on, he designed the cover of his friend Brian Aldiss' novel Hothouse in 1962.

From 1969 until 1973 he was a lecturer in photography at Exeter College of Art and Design, after which he returned to painting full time until a stroke disabled him in 1996.

Although Mellor's early paintings included bleak deserted landscapes, the female form was a recurrent motif in his art. Strongly influenced by Freudian theory, female desire and sexual freedom became a major theme that, with his association with the Nicholas Treadwell Gallery in London in the first half of the 1970s, grew increasingly erotic. Later, however, he returned to a purer surrealism, marked by oneiric subject matter "rendered with academic precision".

== Personal ==
Oscar Mellor married three times, each marriage ending in divorce. The first was in Birmingham in 1948 to Iris Poulton. They had two children and his wife helped with the work of the Fantasy Press. They divorced in 1967. The second marriage was to Yvonne Taylor between 1969 and 1978. The third was to Maureen Sandford, with whom he spent the summers of 1979-84 touring and photographing World War I sites. They married in 1983 and divorced in 1998.

== Bibliography ==
- Morris, Desmond: The British Surrealists, Thames and Hudson (2022), “Oscar Mellor”, pp. 129–33. ISBN 978-0-500-02488-1
- Sidey, Tessa: Surrealism in Birmingham 1935–1954, Birmingham Museums and Art Gallery (2000), “Oscar Mellor”, pp. 59–60. ISBN 978-0-7093-0235-3

== See also ==
- Artnet, Paintings 1971-84
- Arts Council Collection, Paintings 1948-73 and Western Front photographs
- Ask Art Paintings 1962-89
- Invaluable Drawings and paintings 1946-92
- Mutual Art Drawings and paintings, 1961-89
