= James Birch (curator) =

English art dealer, curator and gallery owner

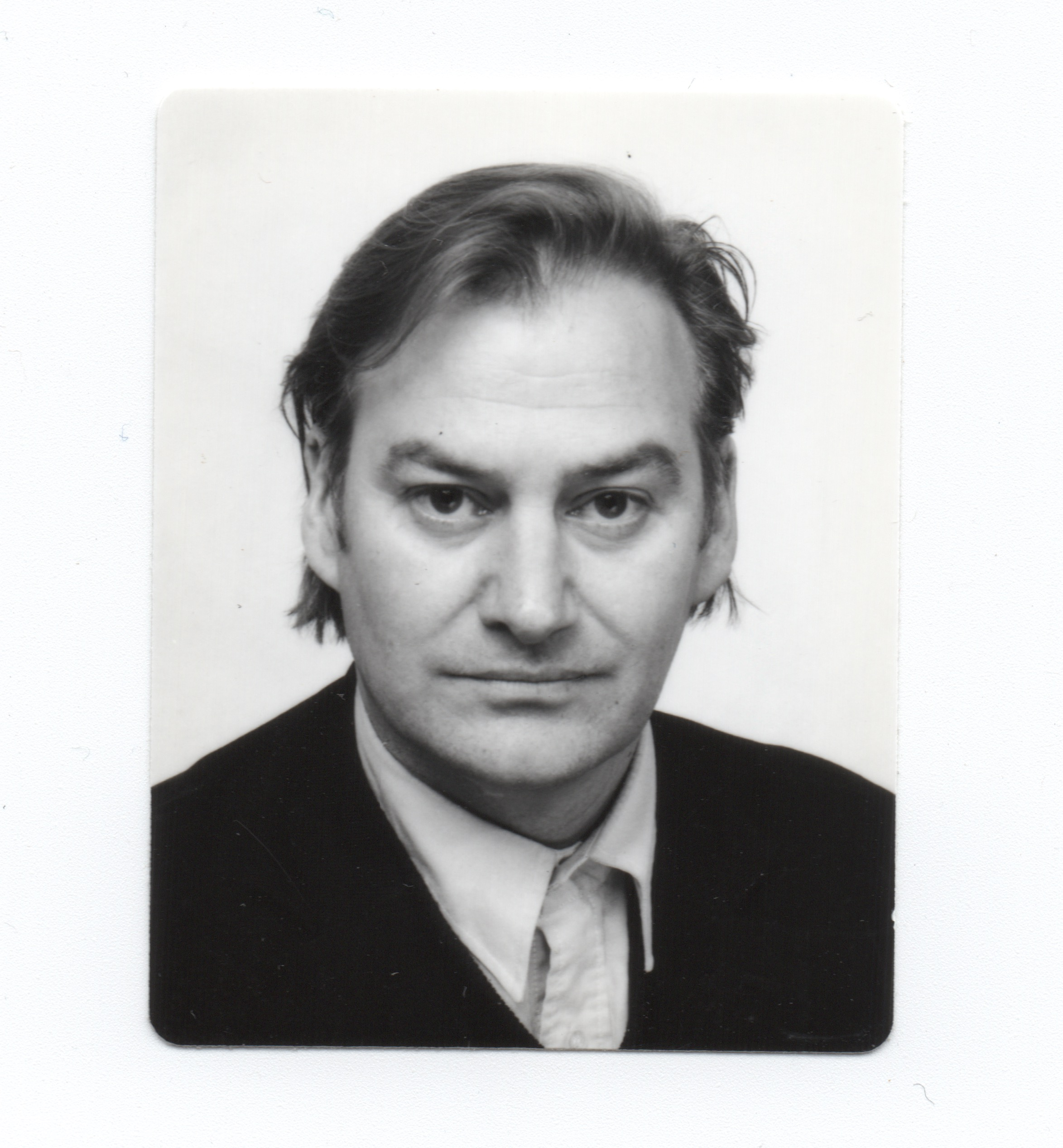
James Birch (curator)

James Birch is an English art dealer, curator and gallery owner. He is best known for his innovative championing of British art, in particular for exhibiting Francis Bacon in Moscow, in what was then the USSR, in 1988, and showcasing Gilbert & George in Moscow in 1990, and in Beijing and Shanghai in 1993.

== Life and career ==
Birch was born in London in c. 1956. His parents were artists, and he had a brother and sister, both of whom were older than him. He was educated at the University of Aix-en-Provence, where he studied Art History, before training in the Old Master department of Christie's Fine Art in London where he later established the 1950s Rock & Roll department.

In 1983 he opened his first gallery, James Birch Fine Art, on the King's Road, London, where he specialised in the work of British surrealists such as John Banting, Eileen Agar, Conroy Maddox and Grace Pailthorpe, the Symbolist and magician Austin Osman Spare and the artist and muse Luciana Martinez de la Rosa.

In 1984 Birch gave the Turner Prize winner Grayson Perry his first show, with a second quickly following in 1985. Perry was a founding member of the Neo-Naturist cabaret with Jennifer Binnie, who Birch had previously exhibited. In 1986 Birch was photographed by Jane England, who included his portrait in her book on 1970s and 1980s subculture in London, Turn and Face the Strange. James Birch Fine Art closed in 1986 and in 1987 Birch opened Birch and Conran Fine Art in Soho, London in association with Paul Conran.

Birch then concentrated on exhibiting Gilbert & George in Moscow in 1990 and Beijing in 1993. The broadcaster and author Daniel Farson wrote the book With Gilbert & George in Moscow (Bloomsbury, 1991) about the Moscow exhibition. Farson also recounted the Francis Bacon (artist) exhibition in Moscow in his biography of Bacon, The Gilded Gutter Life of Francis Bacon (Pantheon, 1993).

In 1997 Birch returned to exhibiting in London when he opened the A22 Gallery in Clerkenwell, where he showed Keith Coventry, the photographer Dick Jewell, Breyer P-Orridge and two exhibitions by members of The Colony Room.

In an article titled 'The Pimpernel Curator', the July 2011 issue of f22 magazine credited Birch with having created some of the 'most imaginative exhibitions of the last twenty years'.

Away from curating, in 2010 Dewi Lewis published Birch's Babylon: Surreal Babies. The book presented Birch's collection of bizarre postcards of babies that were produced in the early 20th century and included a foreword by George Melly

In 2017 Birch collaborated with the author and counterculture writer Barry Miles to produce a book and exhibition charting the history of the British underground press of the 1960s entitled The British Underground Press of the Sixties. The exhibition was held at Birch's own A22 Gallery in Clerkenwell, London.

Birch regularly lends art works to art institutions and galleries for major and small scale exhibitions. Some of the recent ones include; Grayson Perry: The Pre-Therapy Years at The Holburne Museum Bath (24 January - 25 May 2020) , Modern Couples Art, Intimacy and the Avant-garde at Barbican Art Gallery (10 Oct 2018—27 Jan 2019), A Tale of Mother’s Bones: Grace Pailthorpe, Reuben Mednikoff and the Birth of Psychorealism a travelling show presented at the De La Warr Pavilion, (6 October 2018 – 20 January 2019), the Camden Arts Centre, (12 April – 23 June 2019) and the Newlyn Art Gallery & The Exchange (19 October 2019 - 4 January 2020), Dear Christine at Vane, Newcastle, (1-29 June 2019) ArthouseSE1, London, (2-29 February 2020)

Birch's book Bacon in Moscow was published in January 2021 by Cheerio Publishing. It is a memoir of his instigating Francis Bacon's exhibition in Moscow in 1988. Grayson Perry described it as "[a] rollicking cultural adventure. Fascinating and true." It received positive reviews in The Times, The Guardian, The Art Newspaper, The Spectator, and was The Observer's book of the week, Hatchards' February non-fiction book of the month, and The Guardian's audio book of the week.

Bacon in Moscow was adapted into a radio play first aired on BBC Radio 3 on 7 January 2024, written by Stephen Wakelam and directed and produced by Jeremy Mortimer, with Timothy Spall voicing Francis Bacon and Luke Norris as James Birch.

Birch’s book Gilbert & George and the Communists was published by CHEERIO Publishing in January 2025. It received positive reviews in the Sunday Times,the FT,The Spectator, the Art Newspaper and the Week.

== Notable exhibitions ==
- Denis Wirth-Miller: Landscapes and Beasts, Firstsite, Colchester, Essex, 1 October 2022 to 22 January 2023.
- "Them" at the Redfern Gallery, January 2020, London
- The British Underground Press of the Sixties with Barry Miles, A22 Gallery, 2018, London
- Gilbert and George (Beijing and Shanghai Museums, People's Republic of China, 1993)
- Christine Keeler: My Life in Pictures (The Mayor Gallery, London 2010)
- Elena Khudiakova: In Memoriam (Dadiani Fine Art, 2015)
