= John Hampson (novelist) =

English novelist (1901–1955)

- Portrait of John Hampson by Howard Coster
- Born: 26 March 1901; Handsworth, Birmingham
- Died: 26 December 1955 (aged 54)
- Spouse: Therese Giehse (m. 1936–1955)
- Relatives: Jimmy Simpson (brother)

John Frederick Norman Hampson Simpson (26 March 1901 – 26 December 1955) was an English novelist writing as John Hampson. Best known for his 1931 novel Saturday Night at the Greyhound, he was a member of a Birmingham Group of working-class authors that included Walter Allen, Leslie Halward, Walter Brierley and Peter Chamberlain.

== Early life ==
Hampson was born in Handsworth in Birmingham. His elder brother was a motorcycle racer, Jimmy Simpson (James Hampson-Simpson).

Prevented by ill health from completing his formal education, Hampson worked in a munitions factory in World War I and held a variety of jobs in Nottingham and Derbyshire in subsequent years, such as a waiter, a chef and a billiard-marker, and running a pub with his sister. A conviction for shoplifting books meant serving a prison term in Wormwood Scrubs.

In 1925 he was offered employment by a wealthy family in Dorridge, Solihull, as a residential nurse and companion for their son Ronald, who had Down syndrome. The security provided allowed him to start writing. He made a number of literary friends, including Forrest Reid, J. R. Ackerley, William Plomer, John Lehmann, and E. M. Forster.

== Work ==
On Plomer's advice Hampson sent three manuscripts to Leonard and Virginia Woolf's Hogarth Press. Though seeing the longer O Providence as "much the better book", they selected Saturday Night at the Greyhound as most suitable first publication. The third manuscript was Go Seek a Stranger, the first novel Hampson had written, which remained unpublished due to its explicit homosexual subject-matter, although Virginia Woolf later remarked, in a letter to William Plomer, "I still think his first purely sodomitic novel the best."

Although the Woolfs saw Hampson as a good writer, they had been pessimistic about his commercial potential, but Saturday Night at the Greyhound proved a success critically and in terms of sales – quickly selling out its first print run and gaining two reprints in its first six months. The later paperback edition by Penguin Books sold 80,000 copies. It was published in the US by Alfred A. Knopf and in France by Gallimard, and was republished again in 1950 and 1986. His short stories were published in prestigious literary magazines through the 1930s, but his second published novel O Providence sold less well than his first, and his next – Foreign English, based on a 1931 trip to Berlin – was rejected by Hogarth Press, which he subsequently left for Heinemann. He published five more novels, but none matched the success of his first.

In 1933, through the American critic Edward J. O'Brien, Hampson met Walter Allen and other writers who came to be known as the Birmingham Group including Leslie Halward, Peter Chamberlain and Walter Brierley, whose novel Means Test Man Hampson provided assistance with. Hampson became a committed anti-Nazi after a visit to Berlin in 1933, and in 1936 at the suggestion of W. H. Auden Hampson married the German actress Therese Giehse, so that she could obtain a British passport and escape from Nazi Germany. (After World War II she returned to Germany unaccompanied by him and survived him until 1975.)

Hampson worked for the BBC during World War II and visited India in 1948.

Hampson had a notable appearance: very small stature, a protruding lower jaw, searching eyes; he invariably dressed entirely in shades of brown and normally wrote in brown ink.

== Death ==
The death of his employer in 1955 saw him leave the house in Dorridge when it was sold, and he died of a heart attack, lonely and virtually homeless, on 26 December that same year.

== Works ==
- Go Find a Stranger unpublished, manuscript believed lost
- Saturday Night at the Greyhound London (1931) (Reprinted, Penguin (1937), Valancourt Books 2014) Gallimard, Paris (?date) tr. Marie-Jeanne Viel as Samedi Soir Au Greyhound, tr. Tartessos, 1943 as Noche de Sabado en Greyhoud
- "The Sight of Blood" (1931) Story
- Two Stories (The Mare's Nest & The Long Shadow) (1931)
- O Providence (1932)
- Strip Jack Naked London (1934); New York (1934) published as Brothers and Lovers
- "Man About the House" London 1935 (285 copies) Story
- The Family Curse London (1936), New York (1936)
- "The Larches" 1938 with L. A. Pavey
- Care of The Grand (1939)
- The English at Table (1944) (in the Britain in Pictures series)
- A Bag of Stones (1952)
