= Birmingham Group =

The Birmingham Group may refer to:

- The Birmingham Group (artists), 19th-century artists associated with the Arts and Crafts Movement.
- The Birmingham Group (authors), mid-20th-century authors interested in the realistic portrayal of working class scenes.
- The Birmingham Surrealists
