= British Surrealist Group =

Artistic group

In May 1936, the first issue of the periodical Contemporary Poetry and Prose was published, a month before the International Surrealist Exhibition was held in London. It was edited by nineteen-year old Roger Roughton, who was a member of what he called the 'loosely-constituted English Surrealist group'. It was followed in April 1938, by the first issue of the London Bulletin which was edited by E.L.T. Mesens, who was one of the organizers of the exhibition.

== Members ==
- Eileen Agar (1899–1991)
- John Banting (1902-1972)
- Paul Nash (1889–1946)
- Emmy Bridgwater (1906–1999)
- Ithell Colquhoun (1906–1988)
- David Gascoyne (1916–2001)
- Henry Moore (1898–1986)
- Herbert Read (1893–1968)
- Humphrey Jennings (1907–1950)
- Len Lye (1901–1980)
- Conroy Maddox (1912–2005)
- E.L.T. Mesens (1903–1971)
- Desmond Morris (1928–2026)
- Roland Penrose (1900–1984)
- Toni del Renzio (1915–2007)
- Edith Rimmington (1902–1986)
- Philip Sansom (1916-1999)
- Julian Trevelyan (1910–1988)
- John Tunnard (1900–1971)
- Simon Watson Taylor (1923–2005)

== Archive ==
- "Roger Roughton". Modernist Magazines. Modernist Magazines Project.

== See also ==
- Surrealism
- Birmingham Surrealists
