= Birmingham Surrealists =

1930-1950 group of Surrealists in Birmingham

The Birmingham Surrealists were an informal grouping of artists and intellectuals associated with the Surrealist movement in art, based in Birmingham, England from the 1930s to the 1950s.

The key figures were the artists Conroy Maddox and John Melville, alongside Melville's brother, the art critic Robert Melville. Other significant members included artists Emmy Bridgewater, Oscar Mellor and the young Desmond Morris.

In its early years, the group was distinguished by its opposition to a London-based vision of surrealism epitomized by the English exhibitors at the 1936 London International Surrealist Exhibition, that the Birmingham group saw as inauthentic or even anti-surrealist, preferring instead to build links directly with surrealism's French heartland.

As World War II approached, however, and the London-based British Surrealist Group fell under the influence of European exiles such as E. L. T. Mesens and Toni del Renzio, the ideological approaches of the two groups converged and they formed increasingly co-operative and overlapping parts of a wider international surrealist movement.

The Birmingham Surrealists would meet in the Kardomah Café in New Street, the Trocadero pub in Temple Street, or in later years, in Maddox's house in Balsall Heath, which would also often play host to more eclectic gatherings including figures such as jazz musician George Melly, poets Henry Reed and Walter Allen and writers Stuart Gilbert and Henry Green.

== History ==
=== Origins ===
The existence of a distinctive Birmingham group of surrealist artists dates from the meeting of Conroy Maddox and John Melville in 1935, after an exchange of letters in the Birmingham Post about what they saw as the excessively conventional art scene in the city. Melville had been one of the "harbingers of surrealism" in Britain, producing a Surrealist Nude by 1930 and being described as a surrealist by critic R. H. Wilenski in 1932. Maddox had become a convert to surrealism after discovering one of Wilenski's books in Birmingham Central Library in 1935.

Maddox and John Melville had an obvious link as artists practicing in the surrealist genre, but Melville was eclectic in his tastes and lacked Maddox's unwavering commitment to the surrealist cause. As a result Maddox also formed a strong attachment to John's brother Robert Melville, who was later to become a widely published critic and whose understanding of surrealism's theoretical basis was to provide much of the group's intellectual underpinning.

Surrealism was supposed to be more than a style of painting and Maddox and the Melvilles courted controversy to bring their disruptive aesthetic and political influence to bear across the city - using the resources of the relatively forward-looking Birmingham Group to sidestep the established Pre-Raphaelite and Arts and Crafts consensus that still reigned at Birmingham School of Art and the Royal Birmingham Society of Artists, in favour of more radical and subversive artistic movements. John Melville had six of his paintings banned from an exhibition at Birmingham Museum and Art Gallery in 1938 as being "detremental (sic) to public sensibility", and in 1939 Robert Melville challenged Professor Thomas Bodkin of the Barber Institute of Fine Arts in public debate, arguing that "Picasso's work invalidates conventional ways of thinking, for it is the work of a free man, he has enlarged the idea of reality".

=== The London International Surrealist Exhibition ===
1936 saw surrealism first come to widespread public and media attention in England as a result of the London International Surrealist Exhibition.

One of the exhibition's key organizers - Roland Penrose - had seen Maddox and John Melville's work at a gallery in Mayfair, and met Maddox at Penrose's house in Hampstead to talk about featuring in the exhibition. The Birmingham artists were highly critical of the selection for the exhibition of artists they saw as "overnight surrealists", such as Graham Sutherland, Cecil Collins, Robert Medley and John Minton, however, and refused to participate. Instead of submitting artworks the group submitted a letter of protest, which was displayed for a period at the exhibition.

In the words of E. L. T. Mesens:

Maddox and two of his friends, John and Robert Melville, had been diffusing an open letter in which they drew the attention of the general public and of the 'intelligentsia' to the fact that the British participation in the Surrealist Exhibition was mainly made up of artists who in their day to day activities, professional habits and ethics could be called anti-surrealist. This statement although not completely true, was sufficiently accurate, as a fair proportion of the artists involved exerted themselves to demonstrate.

Despite their refusal to exhibit, Maddox and the Melvilles attended the exhibition and made contact there with leading continental surrealists including André Breton, Max Ernst and Salvador Dalí.

The exhibition was also attended by Birmingham-born artist Emmy Bridgwater, whose work was transformed by the experience and who made contact with the group through John Melville on her return to Birmingham.

=== Continental links ===
Possibly as a result of the 1936 snub, no Birmingham artists were invited to exhibit at the major London surrealist exhibitions of 1937 and 1938 - the group instead continuing to exhibit with the Birmingham Group in the Midlands, with Maddox and Robert Melville focusing on building relations with what they saw as the more authentic surrealists of continental Europe.

Despite his limited French, Maddox travelled to Paris repeatedly between 1936 and 1939, frequenting surrealist meetings at Le Dome Cafe and the Académie de la Grande Chaumière and forming long-lasting relationships with Man Ray and Georges Hugnet, whose influences were quickly to become apparent in his work.

Maddox's continental contacts were to greatly improve relations between the surrealists of Birmingham and London after mid-1938, when the London Gallery - the nerve centre of London surrealism - fell under the directorship of Mesens, who had been involved with continental surrealism since its inception in 1924. Maddox was invited to the October 1938 meeting of the British Surrealist Group at the personal insistence of Breton, and Mesens invited both Maddox and John Melville to exhibit in the next major London Gallery exhibition - 1939's Living Art in England. Maddox and the Melvilles officially joined the group in 1938, with Bridgewater joining in 1940.

All four were subsequently frequent contributors to the Mesens-published London Bulletin and in November 1939 Maddox's work was exhibited alongside that of Breton, Georges Braque, Wassily Kandinsky, René Magritte and Marcel Duchamp at the Guggenheim Jeune Gallery.

=== World War II ===
The major Birmingham surrealists were relatively unaffected by the onset of war: Maddox and the Melvilles all having reserved occupations in Birmingham's wartime industries, while Bridgwater escaped call-up as a woman.

In contrast, surrealist activity in London virtually ceased with the closure of the London Gallery in 1939 and the London Bulletin in 1940, and the Birmingham group expended considerable energy in attempts to reinvigorate wider English surrealist activity. Maddox played an organizing role in 1940s Surrealism Today exhibition at London's Zwemmer Gallery and designed its highly provocative window display with John Banting, while Robert Melville played a key role in the conception of Arson: An Ardent Review - Toni del Renzio's attempt ‘to provoke authentic collective Surrealist activity’ that featured all of the major Birmingham figures among its contributors.

Despite a heavy Birmingham presence also at del Renzio's November 1942 Surrealism exhibition, Maddox and Robert Melville split from del Renzio over their associations with the New Apocalyptics movement and its Birmingham-based pioneer Henry Treece. Partly as a result of this the Birmingham group sided strongly and decisively with Mesens when he in turn split acrimoniously with del Renzio over the leadership of the Surrealist Group in England in 1944.

=== Post War ===
Desmond Morris, The Courtship I (1948), Oil on canvas.

Surrealism in Birmingham gained several significant new figures in the immediate post-war era, with Oscar Mellor taking up painting more seriously on returning from service in the RAF and meeting Maddox in 1946, and Desmond Morris (already producing surrealist artworks as a teenager in Wiltshire) enrolling at the University of Birmingham in 1948 and quickly discovering what he termed "Conroy Maddox's surrealist court".

The profile of Birmingham artists within wider the wider surrealist movement remained high, with Maddox and Bridgewater featuring among only six English artists selected by Breton for the last major international surrealist group exhibition, the Exposition Internationale du Surrealisme at the Galerie Maeght in Paris in 1947 and Bridgwater's paintings and poetry appearing in major surrealist journals in France and Belgium.

New local exhibition opportunities also opened up with the Birmingham Artists Committee (co-founded by Mellor) explicitly promoting challenging art forms at its annual Invitation Exhibition.

The late 1940s also saw a continuation of the group's disruptive surrealist activities across the city, with Morris's unexplained abandonment of a giant elephant skull on a Broad Street provoking a perplexed response from the police and press alike, and the city council strongly resisting Maddox's repeated attempts to stage a series of violent scenes involving nuns in city centre shop windows.

The focus of surrealist activity in the period was Maddox's house overlooking Calthorpe Park in Balsall Heath. Maddox had long harbored ambitions to own a surrealist house - suggesting spaces filled entirely with bricks and rooms furnished with life-sized chess pieces as possible decorative schemes. When a property was finally found in Autumn 1946 a less ambitious, though still eccentric, design featuring a giant loom, mandolins and wallpaper hand-printed on an adapted washing mangle was adopted.

Weekend parties drew in a wide variety of unconventional attendees from well outside the core surrealist circle. Guardian journalist Tim Hilton, who grew up nearby, recalled:

Festivities were common in Maddox's surrealist villa. I attended carousals there with other undisciplined children, women in Gypsy dress, poets, communist intellectuals from the University of Birmingham, and early postwar Caribbean immigrants ... The Balsall Heath house also contained dozens of unsold paintings and many photographs of Maddox in the company of a nun. Some of their activities involved a crucifixion, the naked but bespectacled Maddox its victim, while the nun drank from a two-pint bottle of the local brew, Mitchell's and Butler's.

The group and its associates also continued the surrealist tradition of "being in the world" by meeting in cafes and pubs around the city, including the Kardomah café in New Street (also a haunt of the young Kenneth Tynan), the Trocadero pub nearby on Temple Street, and the International Centre - a meeting place of immigrants and refugees - in Suffolk Street.

=== Breakup ===
In July 1948, a Short Manifesto from The Surrealist Group in Birmingham was published and signed by twelve Birmingham artists, including Maddox and Mellor but missing major figures such as Bridgewater, Morris and the Melvilles. Its call for the formation of an "active surrealist group" to reject the "patriotic myths, official pedagogy, the debris of moral rationing which constitutes much of the art, poetry and philosophy of our time" was not without irony though: English surrealism was increasingly looking like a spent force and the manifesto had a far from galvanising effect on local artists.

As the 1950s wore on, the group drifted apart. Bridgewater moved to Stratford-upon-Avon in 1951 to look after her ill mother and disabled sister, ceasing artistic activity for almost two decades. Mellor and Morris both moved to Oxford to continue in education. John Melville remained in Birmingham, though he withdrew from public exhibition after the failure of his 1951 exhibition at London's Hannover Gallery and was increasingly attracted away from surrealism to forms such as still life and portraiture.

Maddox himself, frustrated at his inability to reinvigorate English Surrealism from Birmingham, moved to London in 1955, where he continued to advocate the surrealist cause throughout the rest of the 20th century. In 1978, Maddox made contact with the surrealist revival on the West Coast of the U.S., and members of that movement visited London to show at Maddox's Surrealism Unlimited exhibit. The Arsenal anthology (1989), was dedicated to Maddox.

In 2013, Desmond Morris was interviewed by Stewart Lee as part of a BBC Radio 4 documentary about the movement.
