= Halward =

Halward is a surname. Notable people with the surname include:

- Doug Halward (born 1955), Canadian ice hockey player
- Leslie Halward (1905–1976), British writer of short stories and plays
- Victor Halward (1897–1953), English Anglican bishop and Scouting leader in Hong Kong and China
