= Birmingham Group (authors) =

The Birmingham Group was a group of authors writing from the 1930s to the 1950s in and around Birmingham, England. Members included John Hampson, Walter Allen, Peter Chamberlain, Leslie Halward and Walter Brierley.

Part of Birmingham's vibrant literary and artistic scene in the 1930s that also included the poets W. H. Auden, Louis MacNeice and Henry Reed; novelist Henry Green, the sculptor Gordon Herickx and the Birmingham Surrealists; the Birmingham Group shared little stylistic unity, but had a common interest in the realistic portrayal of working class scenes.

The group was christened by the American critic Edward J. O'Brien, who published several of their short stories in journals he edited and assumed they all knew each other. This became self-fulfilling, and for a while the group met weekly in a pub off Corporation Street.

Although the Birmingham Group are often described as working class novelists, they in fact had the varied social backgrounds that characterised Birmingham's distinctive high level of social mobility. The Birmingham-based poet Louis MacNeice described how:

At this time, 1936, literary London was just beginning to recognise something called the Birmingham School of novelists. Literary London, hungry for proletarian literature, assumed that the Birmingham novelists were proletarian. Birmingham denied this. It could be conceded however that they wrote about the People with a knowledge available to very few Londoners.

— Louis MacNeice, The Strings are False: An Unfinished Autobiography

== Notable works ==
- John Hampson – Saturday Night at the Greyhound (1931)
- Walter Brierley – Means Test Man (1935)
- Leslie Halward – Let Me Tell You (1938)
- Walter Allen – All in a Lifetime (1959)
