= Walter Brierley (writer) =

English novelist

Walter Brierley (1900–1972) was an English novelist active in the 1930s and one of the Birmingham Group of writers. His first book Means Test Man has been called “one of the most powerful and original novels of that decade.”

Born in Waingroves, Derbyshire, to a family of miners, Brierley left school at 13 and started work at the local colliery. Following Workers’ Educational Association night classes he applied through the Miners Welfare Scholarship to study at Nottingham University College, but later returned to mining until made redundant in the early 1930s.

Following encouragement from Birmingham Group writers John Hampson and Walter Allen, Brierley became a full-time writer and his first novel, Means Test Man, was published in 1935, drawing on first-hand experience of unemployment and poverty. It is regarded as a key work of 1930s working-class literature, and has been reprinted twice. His second novel Sandwichman followed in 1937 and has also been reprinted. Further writing included two more novels, as well as radio plays, but Brierley was unable to make a living as a writer and worked full time as an education welfare officer until retirement in the 1960s.

== Works ==
- Means Test Man (1935, 1983 ISBN 0-85124-377-0, 2011)
- Sandwichman (1937, 1990 ISBN 978-0-85036-391-3)
- Dalby Green (1938)
- Danny (1940)
