= Hothouse (novel) =

1962 science fiction novel by Brian Aldiss

- First edition
- Author: Brian Aldiss
- Cover artist: Oscar Mellor
- Language: English
- Genre: Dying Earth genre
- Publisher: Faber and Faber
- Publication date: 1962
- Publication place: United Kingdom
- Media type: Print (hardback & paperback)
- Pages: 253
- Award: Hugo Award for Best Short Fiction (1962)

Hothouse is a 1962 science fiction novel by British writer Brian Aldiss, composed of five novelettes that were originally serialised in The Magazine of Fantasy & Science Fiction in 1961. In the US, an abridged version was published as The Long Afternoon of Earth; the full version was not published in the United States until 1976.

== Plot introduction ==
Set in a far future, the Earth has locked rotation with the Sun, and is attached to the now-more-distant Moon, which resides at a Trojan point, with cobwebs spun by enormous spider-like plants. The Sun is described as "paralysing half the heaven" and "always fixed and still at one point in the sky" and, with the increased light and heat, the plants are engaged in a constant frenzy of growth and decay, like a tropical forest enhanced a thousandfold. The plants – many now omnivores – have filled all the ecological niches on the land and in the air, many evolving primitive nervous systems and, in some cases, eyes; of the animals in the forest only the descendants of four species of social insects remain – tigerflies (evolved from wasps), tree-bees, plant-ants and termights (from termites) – along with small groups of humans (a fifth of the size they are now); all other land and air animals have been driven to extinction by the vegetable kingdom, apart from a few shore dwellers. The humans live on the edge of extinction, within the canopy layer of a giant banyan tree that covers the continent on the day side of the Earth.

== Plot summary ==
Lily-yo, leader of a small, matriarchal human tribe, decides that the group should break up, as the adults are too old, and should go to the "Tips", the dangerous top levels of the forest, to go "Up". "Burnurns" – transparent seed-casings – are collected, and the adults seal themselves inside after which the young attach them to the webs of the giant spider-like plants called "Traversers", which travel into space to receive more intense sunlight and escape the parasitic tigerflies; as planned a traverser brushes against the sticky pods and carries them to the moon (which now has a breatheable atmosphere).

The unconscious adults reach their destination, where they discover they have transformed into "Flymen", mutated by space radiation into flight-capable forms. They meet others and are impressed into an expedition back to Earth to kidnap human children to increase the Flymen population. They hide inside a Traverser to make the return journey to Earth.

Back in the jungle, Toy is now the new leader. While attempting to kill a large seed-shaped "suckerbird", the tribe accidentally become passengers on the suckerbird. After a long flight, they crash on the coast at the base of a "termight" castle on a peninsula. Walking back to the forest through "Nomansland" – the lethal interface-area between land and sea – Gren is waylaid by a "morel", a sentient fungus which attaches itself to his head and forms a symbiotic relationship. After a power-struggle, Gren leaves the tribe with his girlfriend Poyly, also taken over by the morel.

On their travels, they meet Yattmur of the Herder tribe, who live in caves in a congealed lava bed. At the "Skirt of the black mouth", an unknown creature with Siren-like capabilities almost leads them to their deaths. Escaping, they meet the Tummy-belly men, some of whom they free by cutting the umbilical cords by which they are attached to a parasitic tree. All board a boat belonging to the tummy-bellies, but during the escape Poyly is killed. The boat, uncontrolled, floats downriver into the sea. After several adventures, the crew find themselves on an iceberg, the boat destroyed, after which the berg abuts a small islet. They leave by hitching a ride on a plant which propagates by using self-propelled, stilt-walking seeds, which instinctively walk to the mainland.

They find themselves at the terminator, the boundary between the day and night sides. To their horror, they realise they are being carried over it. After a long journey, the seed stops near the top of a mountain, which is tall enough to still be lit by the low sun. There, Yattmur gives birth to Gren's child; Gren, increasingly taken over by the morel, wants the baby to host it as well. They meet the Sharp-furs, tribal baboons who use speech, and then they are approached by the Sodal Ye, a highly evolved fish, and his three-human servants. In return for food, the Sodal Ye thinks of a way to remove the morel from Gren's head by coaxing it into a bowl.

They decide to accompany the Sodal Ye back to Bountiful Basin, an arm of the sea close to the terminator. On the way they witness a solar flare. The morel explains to them that the world is about to end as the Sun brightens, and the strange, green columns they begin to see beaming into space are shafts of organic material, transferring to new star systems.

Followed by sharp-furs and others, they notice a traverser has landed and blocked the passage to their destination. This is the traverser that was carrying Lily-yo and companions. The morel manages to take over the Sodal Ye and when they reach the giant spider, Gren meets Lily-yo again. They board a traverser which is going to lift off to the stars (after being taken over by the morel which has now divided) – all except Gren, Yattmur, and the baby, who decide to return to the familiar forest – for the end of the world, while soon, will not occur within any of their lifetimes.

== Characters and species ==
=== Characters ===
- Gren – Young male tribesman. Later, hosts a morel.
- Lily-yo – Leader of Gren's tribe.
- Band Appa Bondi – Flyman; stolen from Earth as a child.
- Poyly – Gren's tribal girlfriend.
- The morel – Sapient fungus; forms symbiotic relationships with other lifeforms and enhances their intelligence.
- Yattmur – Gren's girlfriend from the Herder tribe.
- Laren – Gren and Yattmur's son.
- The tummy-belly men (fishers) – Humans who have become symbionts with the Tummy Trees. They lack courage and panic loudly at anything they find disturbing.
- Sodal Ye – Prophet of the Nightside mountains.

=== Species ===
- Flymen – Human sub-species; able to glide and fly. Principally moon-dwellers.
- Sharp-furs – Denizens of the Nightside, descended from baboons.
- Sodals – Descended from dolphins, and now the most intelligent of all life on Earth. The only species that realises the Earth is doomed.
- Traversers – Giant spider-like vegetables, they spin webs that stretch between the Earth and Moon, and a few have travelled to nearby stars. Their ten-thousand year infancy is now spent on the Moon, away from the worst of the parasitic tigerflies (their only enemies). When mature they live on the solar radiation in space, returning to the Earth to feed and mate, and the Moon to bud.

== Reception ==
The five Hothouse stories were collectively awarded the 1962 Hugo Award for Best Short Fiction.

James Blish called the stories "utter nonsense", and chastised Aldiss for ignoring basic rules of physics. The magazine editor actually sought scientific advice about one aspect of the book. He was told that the orbital dynamics involved meant that it was nonsense, but the image of the Earth and Moon side by side in orbit, shrouded with cobwebs woven by giant vegetable spiders, was so outrageous and appealing that he published it anyway.

Galaxy reviewer Floyd C. Gale praised the novel as "a tour-de-force guaranteed to startle the most blasé SF buff."

== Magazine stories ==
Hothouse was originally published as five novelettes in The Magazine of Fantasy & Science Fiction:

Story	Issue date	Issue #
"Hothouse"	February 1961	117
"Nomansland"	April 1961	119
"Undergrowth"	July 1961	122
"Timberline"	September 1961	124
"Evergreen"	December 1961	127

== Versions and adaptations ==
- Gamma World, a science fantasy role-playing game, first published by TSR in 1978, was partly inspired by the novel, as noted in the foreword to the game's first edition rulebook.
- The story was later loosely adapted into a four-part comic entitled Hom, by Carlos Giménez in Continuity Comics' Echo of Futurepast anthology.

== General and cited sources ==
- Hothouse on his official site
- SF Site review
- Lost Book Archives review
