= Ginger Gilmour =

American artist

- Born: Virginia Hasenbein; January 19, 1949 (age 77); Philadelphia, Pennsylvania, U.S.
- Occupations: Artist; sculptor; model
- Spouse: David Gilmour (m. 1975; div. 1990)
- Children: 4
- Website: www.gingergilmour.co.uk

Ginger Gilmour (born Virginia Hasenbein; January 19, 1949) is an American artist, sculptor, and former model. Between 1975 and 1990, she was married to Pink Floyd guitarist David Gilmour. Since their divorce, she has lived in England.

== Personal life ==
From 1962 to 1966, Hasenbein studied at Wayne Memorial High School in Wayne, Michigan, and graduated cum laude. She then undertook a two-year foundation course in chemical engineering and art at Michigan State University.

Hasenbein met David Gilmour in Ann Arbor, Michigan, in October 1971, while accompanying her then boyfriend backstage at a Pink Floyd concert. She described their meeting as "love at first sight", and they married on July 7, 1975 with the wedding reception held at Abbey Road Studios. The couple had four children: Alice (born 1976), Clare (born 1979), Sara (born 1981, now a fashion stylist), and Matthew (born 1985).

She is depicted on the inner sleeve of Gilmour's 1978 eponymous first solo album. They separated during Pink Floyd's 1987–89 world tour and later divorced. She published a book about her life with him, Memoirs of the Bright Side of the Moon, in 2015.

== Art ==
Gilmour studied for eight years with the English artist Cecil Collins. She now works from her 15th-century farmhouse near Yapton, West Sussex, where she has created several studios. A recurring theme in her work is angels. She also teaches art and a form of esoteric healing called 'Mental Colour Healing'. Her work has been exhibited in a number of galleries and other venues, including Mall Galleries, London, Arundel Castle, and the German Embassy in London. She worked in partnership with California-based artists Dana Lynne Anderson and Annie Harrison under the 'Renowned Artist' brand. She has been commissioned to produce work for gardens at the Hampton Court Flower Show and Gardeners' World Live and has illustrated books by Phil Murray. As of July 2011, her 11-foot sculpture inspired by the Olympic Games is installed at Heathrow Airport's Terminal 5.

Gilmour is a member of the Society of Women Artists. In June 2007, she received a British Red Cross Award for 'Services to Humanity'.

== Bibliography ==
- —— (2015). Memoirs of the Bright Side of The Moon. Angelscript International LLP. ISBN 978-0-9933023-0-5.

Books illustrated by Gilmour:

- Murray, Phil (August 1, 1994). Before the Beginning is a Thought: True Basics of Real Success Through Natural Philosophy. Perfect Words & Music Ltd. ISBN 978-1-898716-10-5.
