= Toni del Renzio =

Antonino Romanov del Renzio dei Rossi di Castellone e Venosa (Toni del Renzio) (15 April 1915 – 7 January 2007), an artist and writer of Italian and Russian parentage, was leader of the British Surrealist Group for a period.

He brought to the British School a wide range of contacts, editorial organization, motivation and philosophy at a time of wartime hiatus. He was born at Tsarskoe Selo, of Romanov heritage, and at the time of the Russian Revolution his family fled to Yalta and then Italy. He explained his desertion from Benito Mussolini's Tripolitan cavalry by the observation that Abyssinians castrated their prisoners. As his flight through north Africa resulted in his arrival in Spain just in time to join the Trotskyist faction in the first year of the Spanish Civil War, other reasons may have existed. He noted in later life that the external supporters of the Republican cause had no motivation to arm or supply this faction and indeed was in fear for his life from both Stalinist and Fascist agents by the time he fled to France about a year later.

== Surrealism ==
In 1938 in Paris, he met Pablo Picasso and André Masson and associated with Benjamin Péret. Arriving in Britain just before the Second World War, he was on the fringes of the Surrealist group and had a brief affair with Emmy Bridgwater. His key work Arson: An ardent review, Part One of a Surrealist Manifestation in 1942 was partially financed by Ithell Colquhoun, whom he married in 1943 and divorced in 1948. Also in 1942 he mounted a London exhibition entitled Surrealism, resulting in more general recognition. Toni del Renzio remained an active pamphleteer until just before his death. He was actively pamphleted against himself by other British surrealists such as E. L. T. Mesens and Conroy Maddox during the time the British movement again found direction with the definitive split with him in 1946.

Renzio was involved in the Independent Group in the 1950s and contributed to the 1956 seminal art exhibition This Is Tomorrow.

Renzio worked as a journalist, art and film director, actor and lecturer, continuing his collage and painting until shortly before he died at Margate, Kent, England. He was survived by his wife, Doris, and their two daughters and two sons who were born as quadruplets when he was aged 70.

"He may have been hated, betrayed and ridiculed, but he certainly was not and could not be ignored."

— Silvano Levy
