= Grace Pailthorpe =

British surrealist painter, surgeon and psychology researcher (1883-1971)

Grace Winifred Pailthorpe
- Born: 29 July 1883; St Leonards-on-Sea, Sussex, England
- Died: 19 July 1971 (aged 87); St Leonards-on-Sea, Sussex, England
- Education: Royal College of Music; Durham University
- Known for: Artist, surgeon and psychoanalyst
- Style: Surrealism
- Spouse: Reuben Mednikoff

Grace Winifred Pailthorpe (29 July 1883 – 19 July 1971) was a British surrealist painter, surgeon, and psychology researcher.

== Early life and World War I ==
Pailthorpe was born in St Leonards-on-Sea in Sussex in 1883. She was the third child and the only daughter among the ten children born to Edward Wright Pailthorpe, a stockbroker, and Anne Lavinia Pailthorpe née Green, a seamstress, who were both members of the Plymouth Brethren, a strict and puritanical religious sect. The Plymouth Brethren were a separatist sect and the children were all home-schooled to limit their exposure to wider society. After Edward Pailthorpe died in 1904 the family moved to Southport in Lancashire.

Pailthorpe enrolled at the Royal College of Music in 1908 but soon decided to study medicine and by 1914 had qualified as a doctor at the Royal Victoria Infirmary in Newcastle upon Tyne with a degree awarded by Durham University. During World War I she served, with some distinction, as a surgeon at military hospitals in London, Paris and Liverpool. In 1915 she worked, alongside both Henry Tonks and John Masefield, at the Hôpital Temporaire d'Arc-en-Barrois in the Haute Marne district of France, and during 1916 Pailthorpe worked as a surgeon at the Scottish Women's Hospital in Salonika.

== Career ==
After the war, Pailthorpe travelled extensively across the world, including four years spent working as a district medical officer at Youanmi in Western Australia between 1918 and 1922. She also worked as a medical officer for a gold mining company in Australia. When she returned to England in 1922, Pailthorpe began studying psychological medicine and Freudian analysis. She started research into criminal psychology at Birmingham Prison and, in 1923, with a grant from the Medical Research Council began research at Holloway Women's Prison. The same year she had a paper on delinquent behavior published in The Lancet and became an associate member of the British Psychoanalytic Society. She proceeded to publish books and papers on the psychology of delinquency and, in 1931, established the Association for the Scientific Treatment of Criminals, which eventually became the modern day Portman Clinic, now based within the National Health Service, and the Centre for Crime and Justice Studies. The Association was the first in the world for the scientific treatment of delinquency and counted among its Vice Presidents Carl Jung, H. G. Wells and Sigmund Freud. In 1932 she published two papers on her Holloway Prison research and in 1934 resumed taking private patients for psychoanalysis.

In 1935, Pailthorpe met Reuben Mednikoff and together they began research into the psychology of art. Married and living in Port Isaac in Cornwall the couple undertook experiments in psychoanalysis and created surrealist art. Pailthorpe contributed to the International Surrealist Exhibition held in London during 1936 and also contributed to other Surrealist exhibitions and publications, such as the London Bulletin. Her paintings and drawings were greatly praised by, among others, André Breton. In 1938 Pailthorpe published The Scientific Aspect of Surrealism which was not well received by other British Surrealist artists. In this, and later works, she put forward the theory that surrealism and psychoanalysis were both means to personal liberation and the development of artistic creativity and freedom of expression. She and Mednikoff undertook analysis of each other's art to determine the associations behind each image. Regarding this as an alternative to conventional analysis, they would swop the roles of patient and analyst between themselves every fortnight. Although Pailthorpe presented the results of these unorthodox studies in lectures to colleagues, the studies were not published during her lifetime. After a series of disagreements about organisation and exhibition spaces, Pailthorpe and Mednikoff were "formally" expelled from the British Surrealist group in 1940.

In July 1940, Pailthorpe and Mendnikoff left Britain for New York City before spending time in California. From September 1942 to April 1943 Pailthorpe worked at the Essondale Mental Health hospital in British Columbia and in 1944 she and Mednikoff had a joint exhibition at the Vancouver Art Gallery. This exhibition which contained over eighty works was hugely influential in the development of surrealist art in western Canada. Alongside the exhibition Pailthorpe gave a number of talks on surrealism, one of which was broadcast by the Canadian Broadcasting Corporation. The couple returned to England in March 1946 and from 1948 until 1952 Pailthorpe was a Consultant Psychiatrist at the Portman Clinic, with Mednikoff as her assistant. She also ran a School of Art Therapy from 1950 until 1958 when she moved to Sussex.

== Death and legacy ==
Pailthorpe died in July 1971. In 1986, Leeds City Art Gallery included Pailthorpe in the major exhibition Angels of Anarchy - Surrealism in Britain in the Thirties and also in their 1992 exhibition Women Artists of the British Surrealist Movement, 1930-1990. A joint retrospective with Mednikoff, Sluice Gates of the Mind was held at the same gallery in 1998. In 2021 exhibition, Fertile Spoon, at the Bosse and Baum gallery showed works by Pailthorpe alongside works by the contemporary artist Mary Stephenson.

In her 2022 novel, Salonika Burning, The Australian writer Gail Jones fictionalises Grace Pailthorpe (as 'Grace'), and her experiences in Macedonia, along with Australian writer Miles Franklin, British painter Stanley Spencer, and Australian adventurer Olive King.

Australian artist and academic Baden Pailthorpe (b. 1984 -) is a third cousin of Grace Pailthorpe. Both have exhibited at the Centre Pompidou, Paris: Grace Pailthorpe in Surréalisme (2024); Baden Pailthorpe in Hors Pistes (2014).
