= Therese Giehse =

German actress

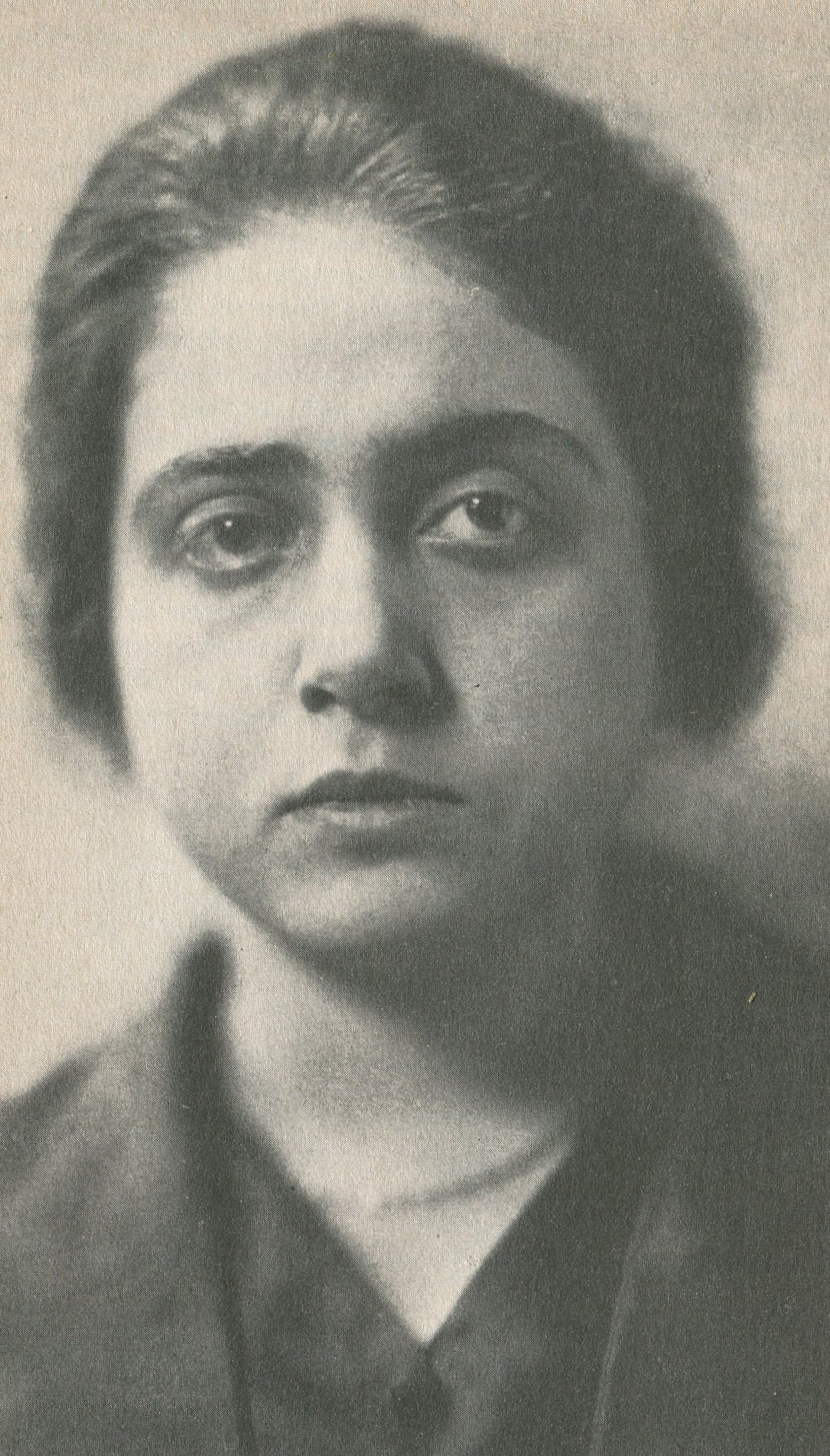
- Therese Giehse in 1919
- Born: Therese Gift; 6 March 1898; Munich, German Empire
- Died: 3 March 1975 (aged 76); Munich, West Germany
- Occupation: Actress
- Years active: 1920–1975
- Spouse: John Hampson (m. 1936–1955)

Therese Giehse (German pronunciation: [teˈʁeːzə ˈɡiːzə]. 6 March 1898 – 3 March 1975), born Therese Gift, was a German actress. Born in Munich to German-Jewish parents, she first appeared on the stage in 1920. She became a major star on stage, in films, and in political cabaret. In the late 1920s through 1933, she was a leading actress at the Munich Kammerspiele.

== Early life ==
Therese Giehse was born to Gertrud Gift and Salomon Gift, a textile artisan. She adopted the stage name of Giehse in 1920 at the age of 22. She practiced acting recreationally throughout her young life.

== Career ==
Giehse began her career in 1920, working with Tony Wittels-Stury in "Stage Society for Primitive and Expressionist Art: Acting". In 1925, she began to act in Gleiwitz (modern-day Poland).

When Nazis came to power in 1933, Giehse left Germany for Zürich, Switzerland, where she continued to act in exile, playing leading roles in Zürich, including in Erika Mann's acclaimed political cabaret, Die Pfeffermühle (which had been transported from Munich to Zürich in 1933).

During her exile, she travelled throughout central Europe with Pfeffermühle. On 20 May 1936, with the help of her lover, Erika Mann, she married the homosexual English writer John Hampson to obtain a British passport and avoid capture by Nazis. She returned to Germany after World War II, and performed in theatres on both sides of the Iron Curtain, but mostly in her native Bavaria, until her death on 3 March 1975, three days before her 77th birthday.

=== With Bertolt Brecht ===
In exile, Giehse played the first Mother Courage in the world premiere of Bertolt Brecht's play Mother Courage and Her Children, in 1941 at the Schauspielhaus Zürich.

After the war, Giehse returned to Munich and to the Munich Kammerspiele, where, in 1950, she again played the role of Mother Courage, this time directed by Brecht himself. This production became documented as the second "Model production" of Brecht's play (the first "Model production" had been performed by Brecht's wife, Helene Weigel in 1949 in Berlin). Giehse and Brecht often conversed in their strong Bavarian (southern German) dialect during rehearsals, making Brecht's wife jealous of their kindred spirit.

In the 1950s, Giehse played several roles as a member of Brecht's theatre, the Berliner Ensemble. In the mid-1970s, she returned to the Berliner Ensemble to perform several Brecht Evenings of the poems, plays, and writings of her lifelong friend and colleague. As a member of the Berliner Ensemble and collaborator with Brecht, she was a much-sought-after interpreter of his work and recordings of her reciting and singing his work appeared on records in both East and West Germany.

=== Other roles ===
Throughout the 1950s and 1960s, Giehse continued to perform many lead roles in various theatres in Germany, often using her considerable comic skills to play character roles, as well as great dramatic roles, such as the leads in several landmark productions by Friedrich Dürrenmatt, the world premiere of The Visit in 1956, and The Physicists in 1962. She later worked with Peter Stein's renowned Schaubühne am Halleschen Ufer in Berlin.

She also appeared in over 20 films and a number of television productions. In 1988, a commemorative stamp was printed in her honour as part of the Women in German history series. In the same year a commemorative exhibition took place at the Deutsches Theatermuseum in Munich

== Partial filmography ==
- The Foreign Legionnaire (1928) - Die Mutter
- The Love Express (1931) - Frau Mayer
- Peter Voss, Thief of Millions (1932) - Putzfrau
- Nacht der Versuchung (1932)
- The Bartered Bride (1932, directed by Max Ophüls) - Photo Concession Barker (uncredited)
- Die Zwei vom Südexpress (1932) - Frau Brennecke
- Der Meisterdetektiv (1933) - Frl. Holzapfel
- Rund um eine Million (1933) - Melanies Mutter
- Die mißbrauchten Liebesbriefe (1940) - Marie
- Das Gespensterhaus (1942) - Kathri
- Menschen, die vorüberziehen (1943) - Boschka
- The Last Chance (1945) - Frau Wittels
- The Mark of Cain (1947) - Sister Seraphine
- Anna Karenina (1948) - Marietta
- No Greater Love (1952) - Frau im Abteil
- Father Needs a Wife (1952) - Frau Nickel
- Must We Get Divorced? (1953) - Frau Holzer
- Children, Mother, and the General (1955) - Elfriede Bergmann
- Roman einer Siebzehnjährigen (1955) - Anna Hoffmann
- Holiday in Tyrol (1956) - Mutter Lindner, Witwe
- Der 10. Mai (1957) - Ida Herz
- Mädchen in Uniform (1958) - Headmistress
- Petersburger Nächte (1958) - Antonida
- Storm in a Water Glass (1960) - Frau Vogel
- The Physicists (1964, TV film) - Dr. Mathilde von Zahnd
- Lacombe, Lucien (1974, directed by Louis Malle) - Bella Horn
- Black Moon (1975, directed by Louis Malle, dedicated to her) - Old Lady (final film role)
