= Ithell Colquhoun =

British artist, author and occultist (1906–1988)

- Born: Margaret Ithell Colquhoun; 9 October 1906; Shillong, Eastern Bengal and Assam, British India
- Died: 11 April 1988 (aged 81); Cornwall, England
- Education: Slade School of Fine Art
- Known for: Surrealist painter and author

Ithell Colquhoun (/ˈaɪθəl kəˈhuːn/ 9 October 1906 – 11 April 1988) was a British painter, occultist, poet and author. Stylistically her artwork was affiliated with Surrealism. In the early 1930s she met André Breton in Paris, and later started working with Surrealist automatism techniques in her writing and painting. In the late 1930s, Colquhoun was part of the British Surrealist Group before being expelled because she refused to renounce her association with occult groups, including the Ordo Templi Orientis and the Fellowship of Isis. Despite her break with the movement, Colquhoun was a lifelong adherent to Surrealism and its automatic techniques.

Colquhoun was born in Shillong in British India, but brought up in the United Kingdom. After studying at Cheltenham Ladies College and the Slade School of Art, she lived briefly in Paris before moving back to London. She spent the latter part of her life in Cornwall, where she died in 1988.

== Biography ==
Margaret Ithell Colquhoun was born in Shillong, British India, the daughter of Henry Archibald Colebrooke Colquhoun and Georgia Frances Ithell Manley. She was educated in Rodwell, near Weymouth, Dorset, before attending Cheltenham Ladies' College. She became interested in occultism at the age of 17 after reading about Aleister Crowley's Abbey of Thelema. Colquhoun studied from 1925 at Cheltenham School of Art for a year. From October 1927 she studied at the Slade School of Art in London, where she was taught by Henry Tonks and Randolph Schwabe. While at the Slade, she joined G.R.S. Mead's Quest Society, and in 1930 published her first article, "The Prose of Alchemy", in the society's journal. In 1929, Colquhoun received the Slade's Summer Composition Prize for her painting Judith Showing the Head of Holofernes, and in 1931 it was exhibited in the Royal Academy.

After leaving the Slade in 1931, Colquhoun spent several years travelling. She established a studio in Paris, where she first encountered Surrealists, including René Magritte, André Breton, Salvador Dalí, Marcel Duchamp, and Man Ray and attended the Académie Colarossi in 1931 where she read Peter Neagoe's 1932 essay What is Surrealism? During the 1930s she also spent time in Greece, Corsica, and Tenerife. While in Greece, Colquhoun met and became infatuated with a woman, Andromache "Kyria" Kazou, who was the subject of several drawings and paintings and an unpublished manuscript, Lesbian Shore. Kazou appears to have visited Colquhoun in Paris and Colquhoun later invited her to move to London so they could live together, though Kazou never did so.

In the early 1930s, Colquhoun submitted works to exhibitions at the New English Art Club and the Royal Academy. She exhibited three paintings in Paris in 1933, and one work at the Royal Society of Scotland in 1934. In 1936, she had her first solo exhibition at the Cheltenham Art Gallery, where she showed 91 works. A solo exhibition at the Fine Art Society in London followed in the same year. Unlike the Cheltenham exhibition, which had shown works from throughout her career to that date, Colquhoun's Fine Art Society exhibition focused on her recent botanical paintings, which had been influenced by her exposure to surrealism.

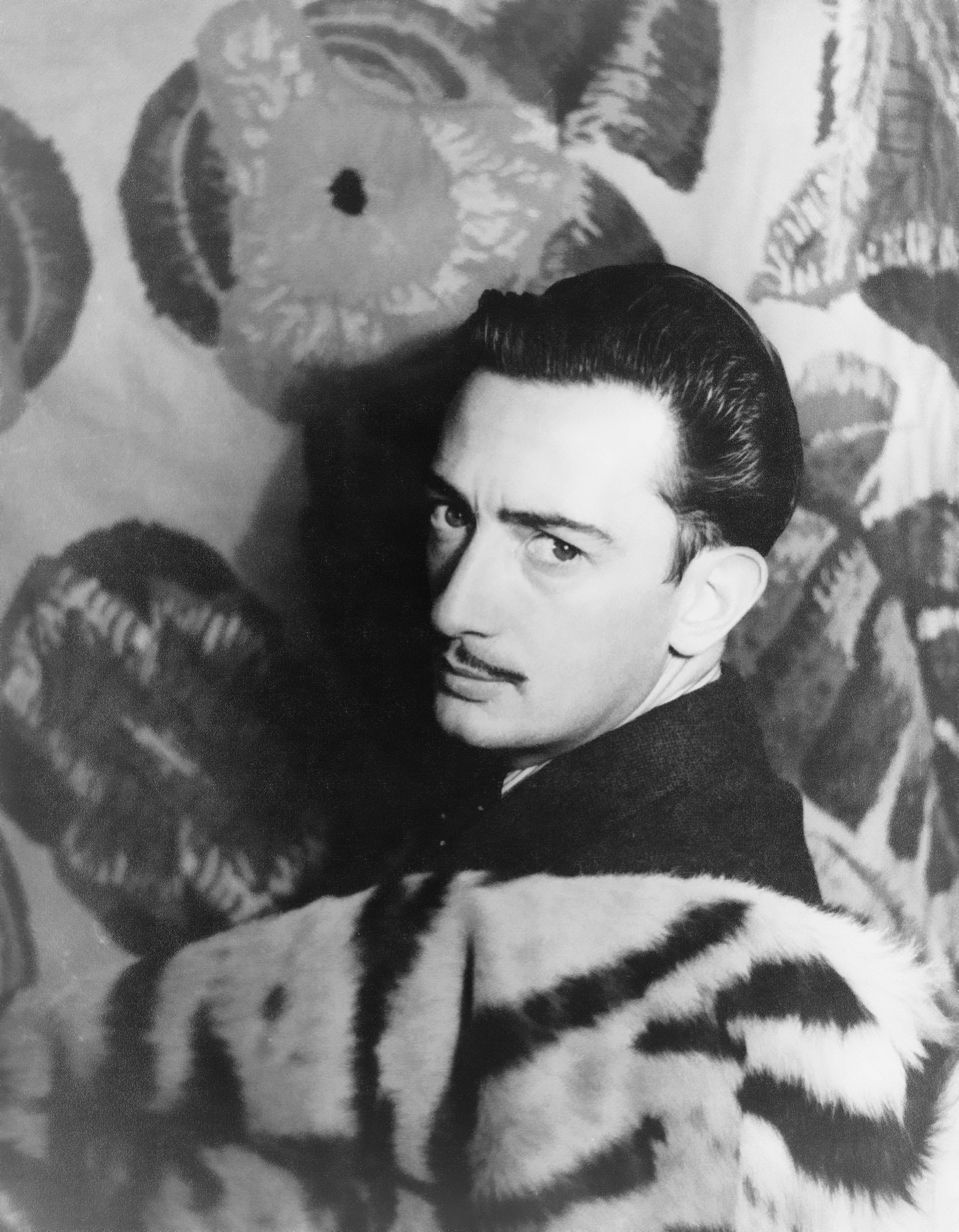
Colquhoun's interest in Surrealism deepened after seeing Salvador Dalí lecture in 1936

Colquhoun's interest in Surrealism deepened after seeing Salvador Dalí lecture at the 1936 International Exhibition of Surrealism in London. In 1937 she joined the Artists' International Association, and in the late 1930s she became increasingly associated with the surrealist movement in Britain. She published work in the London Bulletin in 1938 and 1939, visited André Breton in Paris in 1939, and stayed with a group of surrealists including Gordon Onslow Ford and Roberto Matta at a chateau in Chemillieu, France, that summer. In the same year, Colquhoun joined the British Surrealist Group and exhibited with Roland Penrose at the Mayor Gallery, showing 14 oil paintings and two objects. After only a year as a member of the British Surrealist Group, Colquhoun was expelled in 1940, due to her refusal to comply with E.L.T. Mesens' demands that the surrealists should not be members of any other groups, which Colquhoun felt would interfere with her studies of occultism. This led to Colquhoun's exclusion from other exhibitions organised by the British surrealists, but she continued to work with surrealist principles.

In the 1940s, Colquhoun met and began a relationship with the Russian-born Italian artist and critic Toni del Renzio. Though he criticised her art as "sterile abstractions" in an essay in his magazine Arson in March 1942, he soon moved in with her, and in December that year she exhibited at a show at the International Art Centre in London, organised by del Renzio. They married in 1943. This marriage further alienated her from the British surrealist movement, as del Renzio had his own rivalry with Mesens, due to del Renzio's ambition to become the leader of that group. According to Eric Ratcliffe, their studio in Bedford Park, London, became an open house for friends, other artists and like-minded individuals. The marriage later became unhappy and they divorced – "acrimoniously", according to Matthew Gale – in 1947.

Colquhoun began to visit Cornwall during the Second World War. From 1947, she rented a studio near Penzance, and divided her time between there and London; in 1959 she moved to Paul, Cornwall. She remained in Cornwall for the rest of her life. After her move to Cornwall, Colquhoun increasingly focused on publishing her writing, and from the 1960s her output of visual art substantially declined in favour of her writing and her occult activities.

She had solo exhibitions in 1947 at the Mayor Gallery, in 1972 at Exeter Museum and Art Gallery, and in 1976 at the Newlyn Orion Gallery. Colquhoun continued making art until around 1983. She spent her final years in a nursing home in Lamorna, where she died in 1988.

Colquhoun left her literary works to the writer Derek Stanford, her occult work to the Tate, and the remainder of her art to the National Trust. The copyright for the works she sold (or gifted) during her lifetime was left to The Samaritans, the Noise Abatement Society, and the Sister Perpetua Wing of St Anthony's Hospital, North Cheam. In 2019, the Tate acquired the National Trust's holdings of Colquhoun's works.

== Art ==
Though only formally involved with the Surrealist movement in England for a few years, Colquhoun first gained her reputation as a surrealist, and identified as a surrealist for the rest of her life. She used many automatic techniques, which were described in André Breton's first surrealist manifesto as a defining feature of surrealism, and invented several herself.

Colquhoun began to experiment with automatic techniques in 1939, and used a wide range of materials and methods, such as decalcomania, fumage, frottage and collage. She developed new techniques such as superautomatism, stillomancy, parsemage, and entopic graphomania, writing about them in her article "The Mantic Stain". Automatism continued to be an important part of Colquhoun's artistic practice for the rest of her life, and following her split from the British surrealist movement it also became a key part of her spiritual activities. In 1948 she demonstrated automatic techniques on British television, on a BBC programme called The Eye of the Artist, and in 1951 she published another article, "Children of the Mantic Stain".

Colquhoun had an early interest in biology, and studies of plants and flowers were a recurring theme in her art throughout her life. Many of her early notebooks contained very detailed drawings of plants, and her early works included a series of enlarged images of flora, occupying the full canvas and painted almost photographically. These botanical paintings from the mid-1930s were Colquhoun's first surrealist-inspired works.

Colquhoun's work often explored themes of sex and gender. Her early work often depicts powerful women from myth and Bible stories, such as Judith Showing the Head of Holofernes 1929, and Susanna and the Elders 1930 – both of which are likely homages to Artemisia Gentileschi's works on the same themes. Dawn Ades sees Colquhoun's treatment of gender as responding to the masculine and patriarchal themes in the art of other surrealists – for instance, where they drew landscapes as women's bodies. Colquhoun's Gouffres Amers 1939 shows a male body as a landscape. Several of her works explore themes of castration and male impotence, including Gouffres Amers and The Pine Family, while she portrays female sexuality much more positively, such as in Scylla. She was also deeply interested in androgyny, particularly in the early 1940s, and produced several works on the theme.

Stylistically, some her works have been described as "macabre" and "sinister". In 1939, she created the work Tepid Waters (Rivières Tièdes) which was displayed at her solo exhibition at the Mayor Gallery the same year. The painting, based on a church in Corsica, may allude to the Spanish Civil War.

In the 1940s, Colquhoun began to create works exploring the themes of consciousness and the subconscious. Her interest in psychology and dreams also attached her to the Surrealist movement. Three works which stand out during the 1940s are The Pine Family, which deals with dismemberment and castration, A Visitation which shows a flat heart-shape with multi-coloured beams of light and Dreaming Leaps, an homage to the artist Sonia Araquistain, the daughter of the former Spanish ambassador to France and Germany, who committed suicide by jumping nude from the top of her London flat.

Throughout the 1960s and 1970s, Colquhoun turned her attention towards collages rather than painting. The last retrospective of her work was held at the Newlyn Orion Gallery in 1976, which showed a large number of collages, many of which were inspired by those of Kurt Schwitters.

== Writing ==
Along with her visual art, Colquhoun was a prolific writer, producing works including poetry, essays, novels, and travel guides. From the 1950s, Colquhoun's output as a visual artist decreased, and she increasingly focused on her poetry and essay writing.

Colquhoun published her first article, "The Prose of Alchemy", in 1930. In 1939, she published several pieces of short fiction in the London Bulletin, along with an essay, "What Do I Need to Paint a Picture?". In the 1940s she continued to publish short works in anthologies such as New Road: New Directions in Art and Writing and The Fortune Anthology, and organised surrealist poetry readings with del Renzio. During this period, her writing was influenced by the New Apocalypse literary movement, as well as the Mass Observation project. She wrote articles on automatism: "The Mantic Stain" – which she claimed was the first English-language essay on surrealist automatism – in 1949, "Children of the Mantic Stain" in 1951, and "Notes on Automatism" in 1980. Later in life she contributed articles to surrealist revival journals.

Colquhoun wrote three travel books: The Crying of the Wind and Living Stones, about Ireland and Cornwall respectively, were published in the 1950s; a third book on Egypt, begun in the 1960s, was never published. In 1975 she published The Sword of Wisdom, a biography of the British occultist Samuel MacGregor Mathers. She published a novel, The Goose of Hermogenes, which was largely written by automatic processes. The novel tells the story of a girl lured to an island by her uncle to help him in his search for the Philosopher's Stone. Colquhoun wrote two more surrealist gothic novels, I Saw Water and Destination Limbo, neither of which was published in her lifetime; I Saw Water was published in 2014 and Destination Limbo in 2021. She also published two volumes of poetry during her lifetime. Grimoire of the Entangled Thicket was a short poetry book inspired by the Tree of Life in 1973, and Osmazone, published in 1983, was an anthology of prose poems, many from much earlier in her life.

== Reception and legacy ==
Colquhoun gained an early reputation within the British Surrealist movement, though in later years she became better known as an occultist. Although her work has largely been discussed in terms of its connection to Surrealism, Colquhoun sometimes stated her independence from the movement. In 1939, the same year she joined the English Surrealist group, she described herself as an 'independent artist' in a review for the London Bulletin.

Though Colquhoun was a relatively unknown artist by her death in 1988 compared to other women surrealists such as Eileen Agar and Dorothea Tanning, more recently there has been renewed interest in her work from feminist and esoteric viewpoints. In 2012, the scholar Amy Hale noted that Colquhoun "is becoming recognized as one of the most interesting and prolific esoteric thinkers and artists of the twentieth century". Hale argued that through Colquhoun's work "we can see an interplay of themes and movements which characterizes the trajectory of certain British subcultures ranging from Surrealism to the Earth Mysteries movement and also gives us a rare insight into the thoughts and processes of a working magician".

In 2020, Colquhoun's work featured in the British Surrealism exhibition at the Dulwich Picture Gallery. In 2021, it was featured in the Phantoms of Surrealism show at Whitechapel Art Gallery, the Unsettling Landscapes exhibition at St Barbe Museum & Art Gallery, and was the focus of an exhibition at Unit London, Song of Songs. In 2025, Tate St Ives hosted the exhibition Ithell Colquhoun: Between Two Worlds, the largest exhibition of Colquhoun's work to date, with more than 170 of her artworks and writings on display. Works by Colquhoun were shown at the College of Psychic Studies in the exhibition The Medium is the Message from October 2025 to January 2026.

== Bibliography ==
- The Crying of the Wind: Ireland, 1955
- The Living Stones: Cornwall, 1957
- Goose of Hermogenes, 1961
- Grimoire of the Entangled Thicket, 1973
- Sword Of Wisdom: MacGregor Mathers and the Golden Dawn, 1975
- Osmazone, 1983
- The Magical Writings of Ithell Colquhoun, 2007 (edited by Steve Nichols)
- I Saw Water: An Occult Novel and Other Selected Writings, 2014 (with introduction and notes by Richard Shillitoe and Mark Morrisson)
- Decad of Intelligence, 2016 (with introduction by Amy Hale)
- Taro as Colour, 2018 (co-edited with Robert Ansell; with introduction by Amy Hale)
- Medea's Charms: Selected Shorter Writing, 2019 (edited by Richard Shillitoe)
- Destination Limbo, 2021
- Bonsoir, 2022
- Sex Magic: Ithell Colquhoun's Diagrams of Love, 2024
