= Edith Rimmington =

English artist, poet and photographer

Edith Rimmington (1902–1986), was an English artist, poet and photographer associated with the Surrealist movement.

== Biography ==
She was born in Leicester and studied at the Brighton School of Art. Whilst in Sussex she met the artist Leslie Robert Baxter. They married in 1926 before moving to Manchester. She returned south, to London, in 1937 and was then introduced to the British Surrealist Group before the end of the decade by Gordon Onslow Ford. Edith was one of the few female members, along with Eileen Agar and her close friend Emmy Bridgwater. Bridgwater and Rimmington had been inspired by the International Surrealist Exhibition which first introduced surrealism into England in 1936. Having joined the London group she was encouraged in her painting, and indeed admired, by the artists Edward Burra and John Banting who became a good friend. Much of her early work, both art and poetry, was reproduced in pamphlets and other short publications by surrealist groups both in England and abroad. She continued working as part of the London surrealist movement well beyond the formal disbandment of the Group in 1947. Rimmington was also recognized in the art manifesto Arson where some of her drawing and collages were reproduced in 1942. This manifesto was an attempt to bring a new light to Surrealism and to focus directly on that movement. In 1950, Rimmington moved from London to live in Bexhill of Sussex. Sussex became an escape for artists and poets traveling away from war torn countries. In her later years of visual art, Rimmington worked with color photography of coastal scenery including Sussex Coast, taken in 1960. She died in 1986 in Bexhill-on-Sea.

== Art ==
The Decoy (1948), oil on canvas

The Oneiroscopist (1947), oil on canvas

There is only one oil painting by Edith Rimmington in the public domain, The Decoy which is on display in the Scottish National Gallery of Modern Art in Edinburgh. The remainder of her works are in private collections but appear from time to time in exhibitions across the globe. Her work entitled The Oneiroscopist (the interpreter of dreams) was exhibited in 2011 at the Vancouver Art Gallery as part of a major exhibition of surrealist art. The title of the artwork actually means “the specialist in looking through dreams” and is a nod to the Surrealism movement. The diving gear next to the human-like bird represents the motive of diving deep into herself to the point of subconsciousness.

Eight Interpreters of the Dream, Oil on canvas, 1940

After attending the International Surrealist Exhibition in London, Edith Rimmington was inspired by the performative gesture of Salvador Dalî showing up in a diving suit. He expressed that he would be “diving into the human subconscious.” Four years after this encounter with Salvador Dalî, Edith Rimmington created Eight Interpreters of the Dream. The painting features eight diving suits hung out to dry under the arches. The flesh-colored suits were intentional with a likeness to decapitated bodies, or artificial limbs. This particular work is significant because it was painted just after the start of WWII.

== Exhibitions ==
- Surrealist Objects exhibition at the London Gallery (1937).
- International Surrealist Exhibition at the Galerie Maeght in Paris (1947).

== Poetry ==
As well producing works of art, and later photography, Edith also wrote poems and poetic prose often created through the medium of automatic text. There is no single volume of her collected work and much is now hidden away in dusty copies of short-run publications. Two such pieces were written for Free Unions, published in 1946 by the London group and edited by Simon Watson Taylor.

=== The growth at the break ===
As fantasy in the claws of the poet is released by the broken arm it becomes imprisoned in the ossiferous callus wherein lice build themselves a tomb in which to escape the magic of the Marvelous. Instead of, with the blood of the wound, rushing like the river to the sea - oh life orgasm - the river is damned. The banks do not overflow and the lice choke as the arm stiffens. The wise eye sees the substitute running its poisonous imprisoned course in the cystic tomb. I see the dark sad face of the wounded man as the arm is amputated.

=== The seagull ===
I try to catch the seagull with a silken cord but I find that the soft cord becomes a fagged iron chain which tears my hands. The gull flies out to sea where it sits brooding. I see it fly back to the beach to join a lazy crowd of gulls where it is fed on human flesh by tanks and guns. I am horrified by the greedy eagerness of the speckled young birds. I find I cannot escape from the chain unless I have to offer my flesh to the gulls. I wait ... thinking of death and living death. I decide that out of living death I may see the gull dive into the sea once more.
