= Angel Planells =

Spanish painter (1901–1989)

Àngel Planells i Cruañas (December 2, 1901 – July 23, 1989) was a Spanish Catalan surrealist painter who was born in Cadaqués and died in Barcelona.

He was born in Cadaqués, where he met artists like Eliseu Meifrèn, Joan Roig i Soler and Salvador Dalí. In 1918 he went to Barcelona to study painting, lithography and engraving, but he returned home due to economic problems. In 1928 he published his first surrealist poems and some art criticism articles.

Between 1928 and 1929, Planells participated in his first collective exhibitions in the Galeries Dalmau in Barcelona (1929) and in Girona. In Cadaqués he met René Magritte and other surrealist artists. Planells's first individual exhibition took place in 1930, in the Dalmau Galleries.

In 1936, Planells formed a part of the Logicofobista group, together with artists Artur Carbonell i Carbonell, Leandre Cristòfol i Peralba, Àngel Ferrant, Esteve Francés, A. Gamboa-Rothwoss, A. G. Lamolla, Ramon Marinello, Joan Massanet, Maruja Mallo, Jaume Sans, Nàdia Sokalova, Remedios Varo and Joan Ismael, and art critic and theorist Magí Cassanyes. The first Logicofobista Exhibition took place in Barcelona, in 1936. The same year, three works of Planells were shown at the London International Surrealist Exhibition. Since 1929 Planells lived in Blanes, where he worked as a professor at the School of Arts.

After the Spanish Civil War, Planells painted landscapes and still lifes, although he continued to paint surrealist subjects in secret. Following the death of Franco, Planells openly returned to surrealism, exhibiting widely in the 1970s and 80s, until his death in 1989. In 2025 his surrealist painting, Napoleon's Harp, achieved a record price at auction of 50,000 euros.
