= Trocadero, Birmingham =

Pub in Birmingham, West Midlands, England

Coordinates: 52°28′46.38″N 1°53′57.93″W

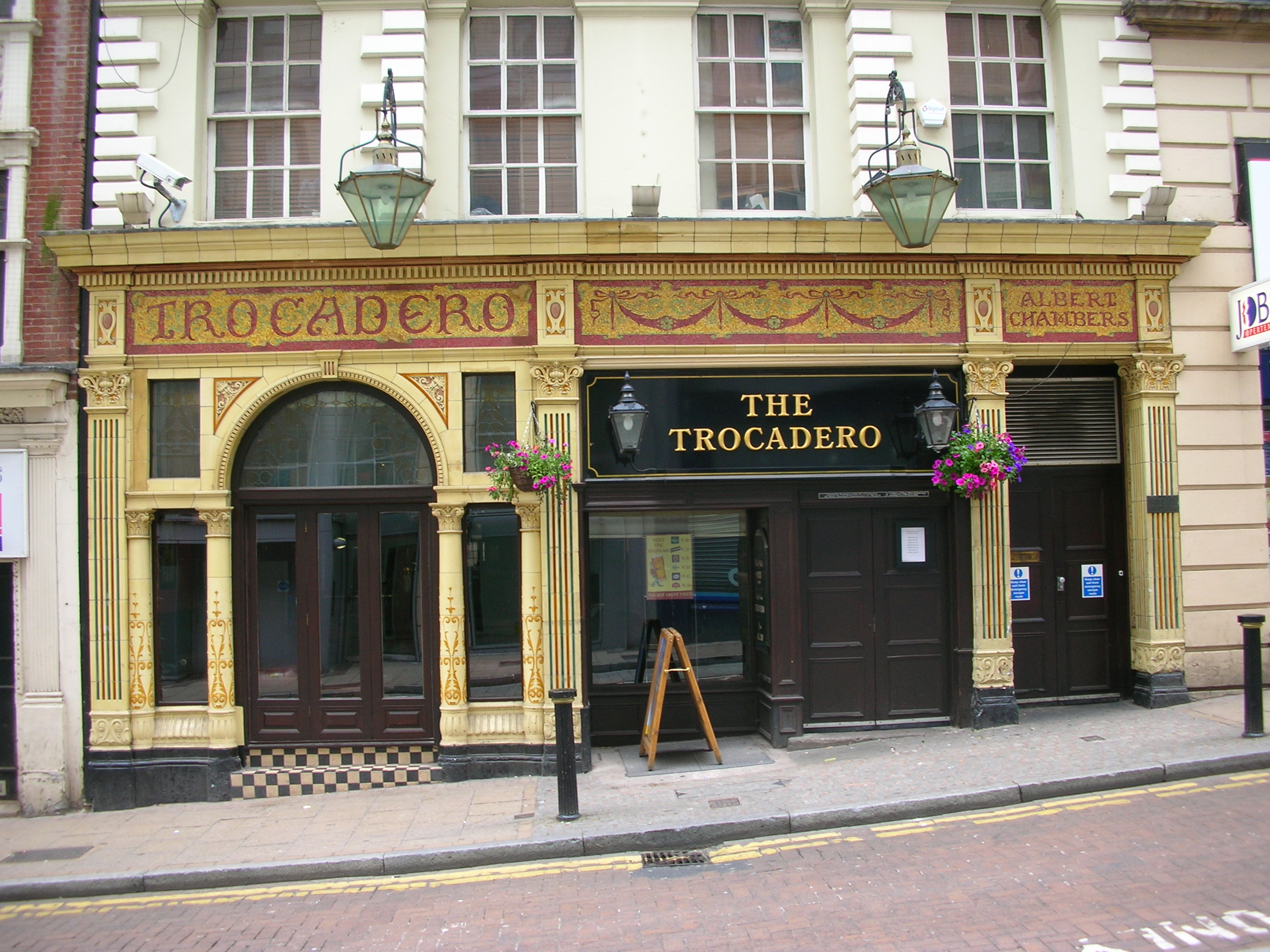
The Trocadero, Temple Street, Birmingham

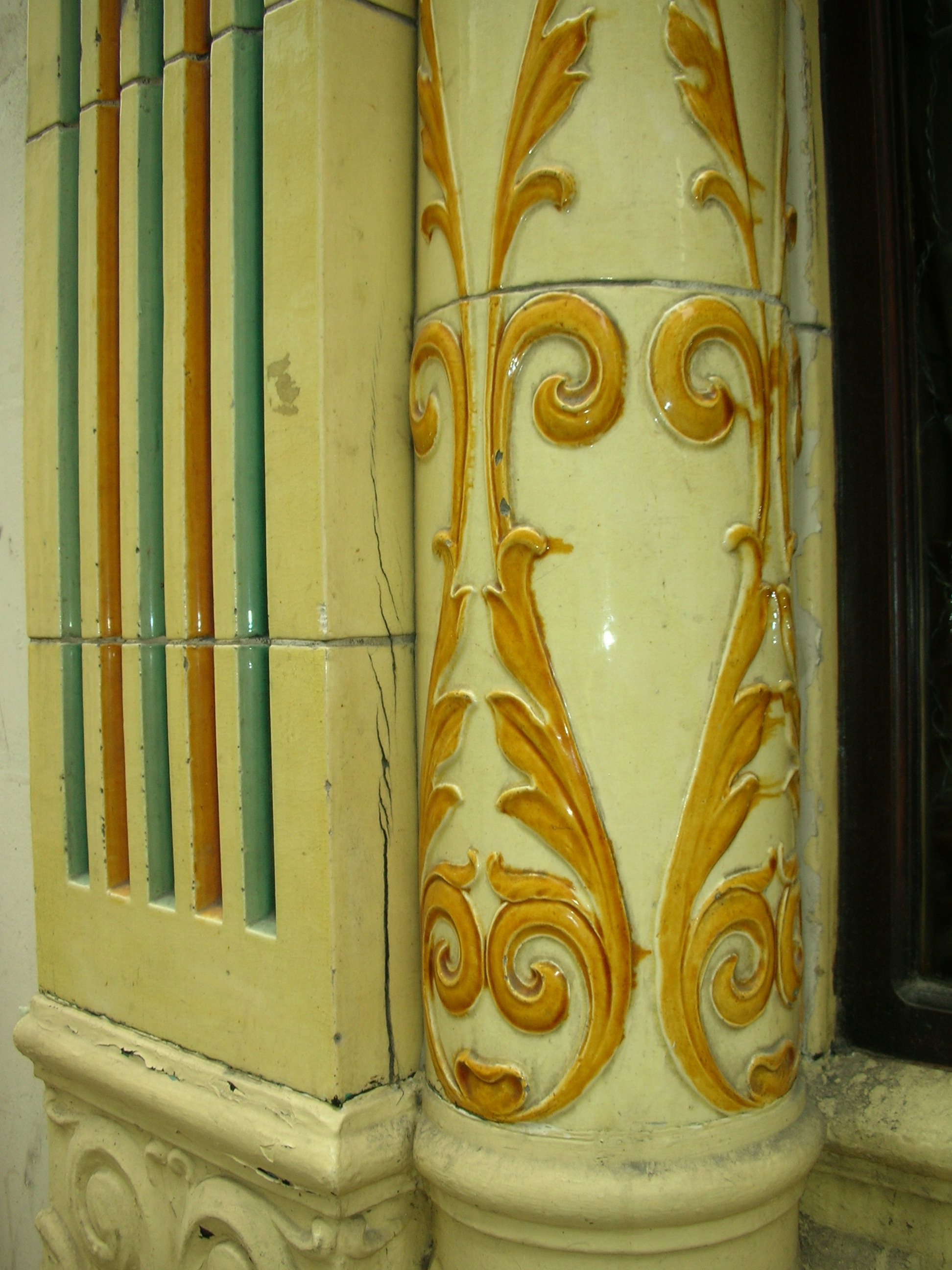
Detail of glazed terracotta.

The Trocadero, 17 Temple Street, Birmingham, England, currently a pub, is a dazzling demonstration of the use of coloured glazed tile and terracotta in the post-Victorian era of architecture.

Formerly the Fire Engine House for the Norwich Union Insurance Company (1846, Edge & Avery), it was altered in 1883 to make the Bodega wine bar. It was given the current colourful glazed front in 1902 when it became the Trocadero. It is Grade II listed.

The pub is noted as a meeting place for the Birmingham Surrealists group of artists and intellectuals associated with the city from the 1930s to the 1950s.

== Sources ==
- Historic England. "Photograph and details from listed building text (1076130)". National Heritage List for England.
- Pevsner Architectural Guides - Birmingham, Andy Foster, 2005, ISBN 0-300-10731-5
