= Elisabeth Collins =

British painter and sculptor (1904-2000)

- Born: Elisabeth Ward Ramsden; 31 October 1904; Halifax, West Yorkshire, England
- Died: 17 January 2000 (aged 95)
- Education: Leeds School of Art; Royal College of Art
- Known for: Painting and sculpture
- Spouse: Cecil Collins (m.1931-1989, his death)

Elisabeth Ward Collins (née Ramsden, 31 October 1904 – 17 January 2000), was a British painter and sculptor.

== Biography ==
Collins was born and brought up in Halifax in Yorkshire where her father was the editor, and owner, of a local newspaper, the Halifax Courier and Guardian and her mother, who was originally from Charleston in West Virginia, was an amateur concert pianist. Collins studied sculpture at the Leeds School of Art before enrolling in the Royal College of Art, RCA, in London, where she was taught by Henry Moore. At the RCA she met and, in 1931, married her fellow student Cecil Collins. Both artists worked in similar styles and often featured elements of folklore or fantasy in their paintings, which led to Elisabeth Collins' work being somewhat overshadowed by that of her husband. Elisabeth also frequently modelled for her husband and worked to support and encourage his work. For a time she exhibited under the name Belmoat to distinguish her work from his. From 1937 to 1945 the couple lived near the artistic community at Dartington Hall, the then home of Leonard Elmhirst and Dorothy Elmhirst, and this was perhaps Elisabeth Collins' most productive period as an artist. Working in gouache, ink and watercolour, Collins produced dream-like images of mystical figures that recalled the work of the surrealists she had previously met in Paris in the early 1930s. From 1948 the Collinses lived in Cambridge where they were among the founders of the Cambridge Society of Painters and Sculptors. At other times the couple lived in London, Yorkshire and Oxford.

In 1973 Collins and her husband were jointly commissioned to decorate a chapel in Chichester Cathedral. After his death in 1989, Elisabeth Collins used her husband's studio to produce a body of work. Retrospective exhibitions of Elisabeth Collins' art were held at both the Albemarle Gallery in London during 1989 and at England & Co. in 1996. Following the England & Co. exhibition, the Tate in London acquired four works by her.

In her later life, Collins became involved with the Russian Orthodox church in London and her funeral was held at the Orthodox church in Knightsbridge. She was buried on the western side of Highgate Cemetery with her husband.
