= Rupert Lee =

English painter

Rupert Lee (1887–1959) was an English painter, sculptor and printmaker. He was one of the organisers of the London International Surrealist Exhibition in 1936.

== Life ==
Lee was born in Bombay in 1887. In 1911 Lee entered the Slade School of Art, where he became friendly with Robert Gibbings and Paul Nash. Soon after leaving the Slade he was employed by Edward Gordon Craig to be his musical director at his theatre school in Italy, but the position was cut short by the outbreak of the First World War. Lee served with the Queen's Westminster Rifles in the Machine Gun Corps and suffered shell shock following the 1918 Spring Offensive. The series of paintings and drawings he produced while serving in the trenches showed him to be in sympathy with elements of Futurism and Vorticism.

Between 1919 and 1922 he collaborated closely with Paul and John Nash producing wood engravings for the Sun Calendar Yearbook and the Poetry Bookshop. At this period his paintings and wood engravings were bought by notable collectors such as Arnold Bennett, Roger Fry and Edward Marsh. Turning his attention to sculpture during the 1920s, he was elected President of the London Group in 1927 and was responsible for organising the important open-air sculpture exhibition on the roof gardens of Selfridges in 1930, after which he became affiliated with Duncan Grant and Vanessa Bell of the Bloomsbury Group. He was Chairman of the 1936 International Surrealist Exhibition at the New Burlington Galleries and worked tirelessly to encourage the modern movement in England. Moving to Spain in 1946, Lee was killed in a motor accident in 1959.

A major book about his life and work was published by Sansom and Co. and a retrospective was staged at the Court Gallery at Gallery 27, Cork Street (London), in May 2010.
