= Wilhelm Freddie =

Danish painter, sculptor and filmmaker (1909–1995)

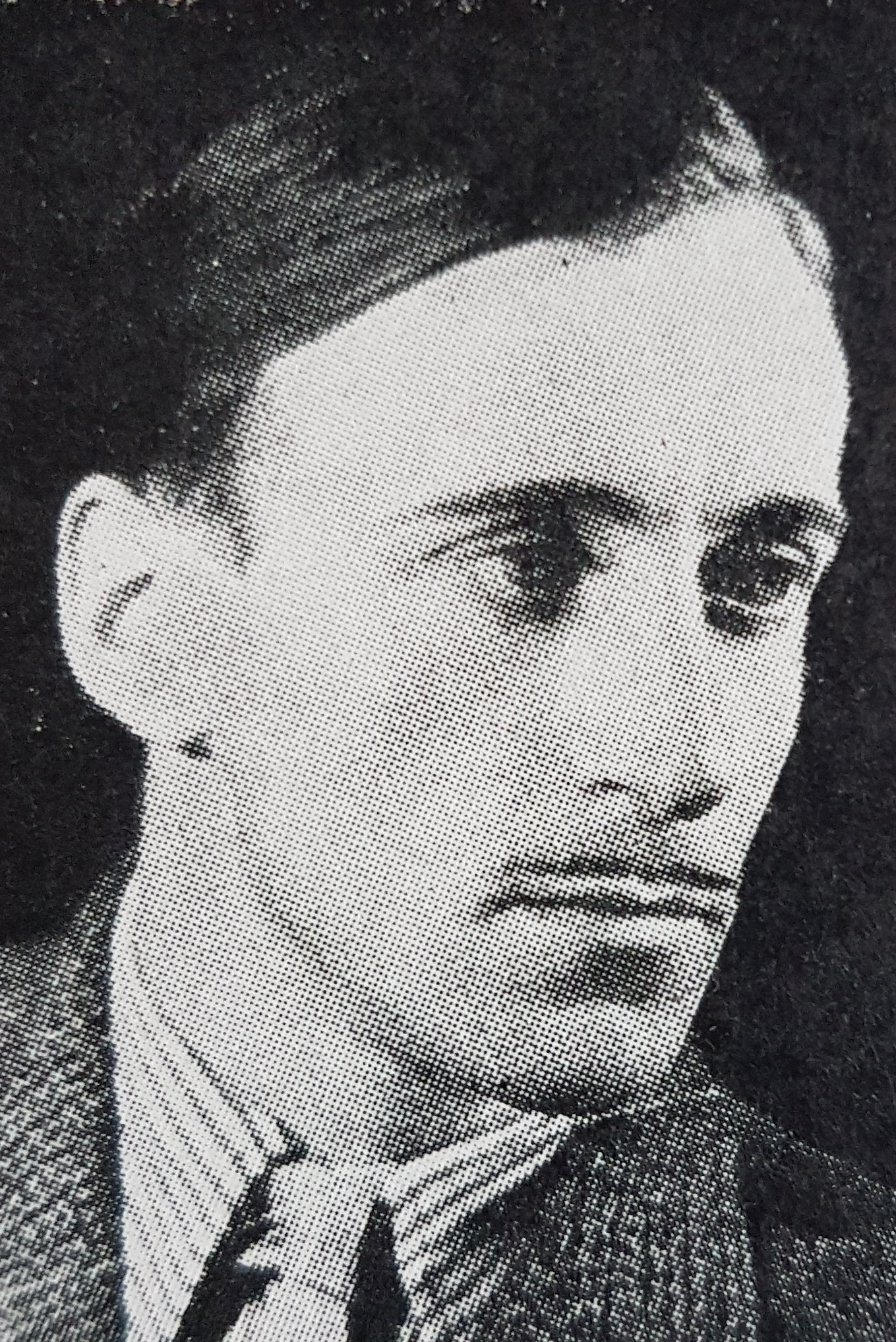
Wilhelm Freddie

Wilhelm Freddie, born Christian Frederik Wilhelm Carlsen (7 February 1909 – 26 October 1995) was a Danish painter, sculptor and filmmaker. Initially working along a somewhat abstract line, he soon turned towards a more realistic surrealism, only to later return to abstract art. Some of his works were highly controversial and considered pornographic at their time, resulting in confiscation of the works and his imprisonment though his artistic merits were later recognized.

Some of Freddie's works criticized Nazism and fascism, like the 1936 paintings Meditation on the Anti-Nazi Love and Phénomène psychophotographique, and his 1938 exhibition Surreal-Sex.

In 1949 and 1950, Freddie directed two short films, The Definite Rejection of a Request for a Kiss (Det definitive afslag på anmodningen om et kys) and Eaten Horizons (Spiste horisonter).
