= Cecil Collins (artist) =

English painter

James Henry Cecil Collins MBE (23 March 1908 – 4 June 1989) was an English painter and printmaker, originally associated with the Surrealist movement.

== Life and works ==
From 1951 to 1975 he taught at the Central School of Art. Later, one of his pupils was Ginger Gilmour.

Collins' style in centered around pagan and early christian imagery in many of his works. The figure of the fool was an important one as well in his vision of the world and art (especially in his essay collection The Vision of the Fool), describing it as "an idealistic figure" pushing back against the "mechanic jungle of the contemporary world", representing "the poetic imagination of life, as inexplicable as the essence of life itself".

Collins was awarded an MBE in June 1979.

A retrospective exhibition of his prints was held at the Tate Gallery in 1981. A retrospective of his paintings took place (before Collins died) in 1989. He was buried on the western side of Highgate Cemetery.

His widow Elisabeth Collins died in 2000 and, in 2008, 250 of Collins' paintings worth £1 million were given to museums and galleries in the UK.

In honour of the centenary of his birth, an exhibition of Collins' work took place at Tate Britain in Autumn 2008.

== Exhibitions ==
- 1935 − Bloomsbury Gallery, London, England
- 1936 − International Surrealist Exhibition − New Burlington Galleries, London, England
- 1942 − Toledo Museum of Fine Art, US
- 1948 − New Paintings by Cecil Collins − Lefevre Gallery, London, England
- 1950 − New Paintings − Heffer Gallery, Cambridge, England
- 1951 − Leicester Galleries
- 1953 − Society of Mural Painters
- 1953 − Ashmolean Museum, Oxford
- 1954 − Arts Council, London
- 1956 − Leicester Galleries
- 1959 − Whitechapel Gallery, London
- 1961 − Gallery Zygos, Athens, Greece
- 1964 − Carnegie International Exhibition, Pittsburgh, US
- 1965 − Arthur Tooth & Sons
- 1967 − Crane Kalman Gallery
- 1971 − Britain's Contribution to Surrealism − Hamet Gallery, London, England
- 1972 − Retrospective Exhibition. Drawings, Paintings, Watercolours, Gouaches and Paintings 1936−1968
- 1981 − New Works − Anthony d'Offay, London, England
- 1981 − The Prints of Cecil Collins − Tate Gallery, London, England
- 1983 − Plymouth Arts Centre
- 1984 − Festival Gallery, Aldeburgh
- 1988 − Recent Paintings − Anthony d'Offay, London, England
- 1989 − Tate Gallery, London

== Bibliography ==
- The Gates of Silence (Grey Walls Press, 1944) by Wrey Gardiner with drawings by Cecil Collins
- The Vision of the Fool (Grey Walls Press, 1947)
- Cecil Collins: Painter of Paradise (1979) by Kathleen Raine
- The Quest for the Great Happiness (1988) by William Anderson
- In Celebration of Cecil Collins: Visionary Artist and Educator (2008) compiled and edited by Nomi Rowe
- The Magic Mirror: Thoughts and Reflections on Cecil Collins (2010) by John Stewart Allitt
- Meditations, Poems, Pages from a Sketch Book, by Cecil Collins (Golgonooza Press, 1997)
- The Vision of the Fool and other Writings, by Cecil Collins, enlarged edition (Golgonooza Press, 2002)
- Cecil Collins, The Artist as Writer and Image Maker, by Brian Keeble (Golgonooza Press, 2009)
