= Reuben Mednikoff =

British surrealist artist (1906–1972

Reuben Mednikoff (1906–1972), also known as Reuben Pailthorpe and Richard Pailthorpe, was a British surrealist artist, designer and poet. Mednikoff is known for his collaboration with Grace Pailthorpe in the development of Psychorealism.

== Biography ==
Reuben Mednikoff was born on 2 June 1906 in the East End (present-day Tower Hamlets) to a Russian Jewish family. Mednikoff's father, Myer Mednikoff, was a tinsmith and his mother, Hetty Mednikoff (Note: Also cited as Annie Mednikoff (née Walter)), was a housewife. Both of Mednikoff's parents were born in Vitebsk, Russian Empire (present-day, Belarus).

In 1920, at age 14, Mednikoff enrolled at the Saint Martin's School of Art. Mednikoff studied illustrations for advertisements and later graduated in 1923.

In 1935, Mednikoff met the painter and surgeon Grace Pailthorpe at a party.

He died 3 May 1972, according to UK Probate records.

== Personal life ==
On 14 December 1932, Mednikoff married Marie Louise De Sousa. De Sousa later left Mednikoff in 1933 following an affair with the artist Harold Llewellyn Botcherby (1907-1943). Mednikoff filed for divorce in 1934, and the divorce was finalised on 28 January 1935.
