= Robert Melville (art critic) =

English art critic and journalist (1905–1986)

Robert Melville (31 December 1905 – March 1986) was an English art critic and journalist. Along with the artists Conroy Maddox and John Melville (his brother), he was a key member of the Birmingham Surrealists in the 1930s and 1940s. An early biographer of Picasso, he later become the art correspondent of the New Statesman and the Architectural Review.

== Early life ==
Melville was born in Tottenham, London, in 1905, the second son of an asphalt contractor's foreman. His family moved to the Harborne area of Birmingham in 1913 and after his secondary schooling Melville spent most of the 1920s in clerical jobs with a variety of industrial companies. In 1928 he married and settled in Sparkhill.

Melville's brother John had shown early talent as a painter and from the late 1920s the Melvilles both developed an interest in the emerging modernist movements in continental Europe, becoming regular patrons of Zwemmer's art bookshop in London's Charing Cross Road. Meeting fellow Birmingham Surrealist Conroy Maddox in 1935 the three set out to challenge Birmingham's conservative artistic establishment. Although not a practising artist himself, Robert Melville had a thorough understanding of surrealism's theoretical background and was to provide much of the group's intellectual underpinning, culminating in an open debate with Professor Thomas Bodkin of the Barber Institute of Fine Arts in 1939 that received widespread press coverage.

== Critic ==
Robert developed a particularly strong interest in Picasso (then little-known in England) that led to an important friendship with Hugh Willoughby, a contemporary collector of Picasso's work based in Hove. During the late 1930s Melville wrote a book on Picasso based on Willoughby's collection that was published in 1939 as Picasso: Master of the Phantom. As Melville described it: "without my knowledge my wife sent my little book to Oxford University Press. Curiously enough they accepted it".

The book was to make Melville's reputation as a critic. He was appointed art critic of the Birmingham Evening Despatch in 1940 and had a series of articles published in The Listener in 1943 and 1944.

In 1950 Melville wrote an article on Francis Bacon in Cyril Connolly's magazine Horizon that was to have lasting influence on Bacon's critical reputation, placing him firmly in the European tradition of Kafka, Dalí, Buñuel and Picasso.

In 1964 Melville wrote a book on the Ned Kelly paintings by Sidney Nolan.

Melville was the art critic of the New Statesman from 1954 to 1976 and wrote monthly pieces for the Architectural Review between 1950 and 1977. When he retired from the Architectural Review Hugh Casson described him as "unchallenged as the most serious (and I don't mean solemn) and illuminating art critic in the country".

== Gallery management ==
Melville moved to London in 1947. He worked first for E. L. T. Mesens' London Gallery, and later the Hanover Gallery. While at the Hanover Gallery, he met Arthur Jeffress, who co-owned the gallery with Erica Brausen. In 1954 Robert and Arthur decided to leave the Hanover Gallery and open a new gallery – Arthur Jeffress (Pictures). They jointly ran the successful gallery until Arthur's death in 1961; after which Robert continued to run the gallery until 1974, during which time it featured works by Pauline Boty, Richard Hamilton and David Hockney.

Melville then worked for Marlborough Fine Art, London, and then he worked at the Marlborough New London Gallery as assistant to the Manager, Tony Reichardt.

== Last years ==
Shortly before his death Melville accompanied Sidney Nolan to Australia where they visited all the areas that Nolan had painted.

== Family ==
In 1928, Melville married Lilian May Lewis Smith, daughter of William Smith, who worked in the rare books department of W. H. Smith. Their daughter Roberta married the British blues musician Alexis Korner.
