= Leslie Halward =

British writer

Leslie Halward (1905–1976) was a British writer known for his short stories and plays.

Born in Selly Oak, Birmingham, his autobiography covering the time from his childhood to settling down to married life as a writer in the small village of Guarlford, Let Me Tell You, was published by Michael Joseph Ltd in 1938. Halward also published short fiction in the magazine New Writing. Halward later wrote Gus and Ida, (1939) a novel with a socialist message.

After wartime service during the Second World War at RAF Defford, he turned to BBC radio dramas and wrote a number of plays reflecting working class life of his era. His other books include To Tea on Sunday (1936) and Money's Alright (1938). Halward died in Worcester, England.

== Bibliography ==
- To Tea on Sundays (1936)
- Money's Alright (1938)
- Let Me Tell You (1938)
- Gus and Ida (1939)
