= London International Surrealist Exhibition =

1936 art exhibition in England

Coordinates: 51°30′35″N 0°08′28″W

The International Surrealist Exhibition was held from 11 June to 4 July 1936 at the New Burlington Galleries, near Savile Row in London's Mayfair, England.

== Organisers ==
The exhibition was organised by committees from England, France, Belgium, Scandinavia and Spain.

The English organising committee consisted of:

- Hugh Sykes Davies
- David Gascoyne
- Humphrey Jennings
- McKnight Kauffer
- Rupert Lee, Chairman
- Diana Brinton Lee, Secretary
- Henry Moore
- Paul Nash
- Roland Penrose, Honorary Treasurer
- Herbert Read

The French organising committee were:

- André Breton
- Paul Éluard
- Georges Hugnet
- Man Ray

The remaining nations had a single committee representative:

- E. L. T. Mesens, Belgium
- Vilhelm Bjerke-Petersen, Denmark
- Salvador Dalí, Spain

The number of exhibits, paintings, sculpture, objects and drawings displayed during the exhibition's run was around 390.

Danish painter Wilhelm Freddie's entries never made it to the exhibition, as they were confiscated by British Customs representatives for being pornographic. According to ruling law at the time, the works had to be destroyed, but this was avoided at the last minute and they were despatched back to Denmark.

== Exhibitors ==
The following artists participated in the exhibition:

- Eileen Agar
- Hans Arp
- Jacqueline B. (Jacqueline Lamba Breton)
- John Banting
- Hans Bellmer
- John Selby Bigge
- Constanin Brancusi
- Victor Brauner
- Edward Burra
- Alexander Calder
- Giorgio de Chirico
- Cecil Collins
- Salvador Dalí
- P. Norman Dawson
- Oscar Dominguez
- Marcel Duchamp
- Max Ernst
- Mervyn Evans
- Leonor Fini
- Freddie
- David Gascoyne
- Alberto Giacometti
- S. W. Hayter
- Charles Howard
- Marcel Jean
- Humphrey Jennings
- Rita Kernn-Larsen
- Paul Klee
- Rupert Lee
- Len Lye
- Dora Maar
- René Magritte
- Maruja Mallo
- André Masson
- Robert Medley
- Reuben Mednikoff
- E. L. T. Mesens
- Joan Miró
- Henry Moore
- Stellan Mörner
- Paul Nash
- Richard Oelze
- Erik Olson
- Meret Oppenheim
- Wolfgang Paalen
- G. W. Pailthorpe
- Roland Penrose
- Francis Picabia
- Pablo Picasso
- Angel Planells
- Man Ray
- Pierre Sanders
- Max Servais
- Styrsky
- Graham Sutherland
- Yves Tanguy
- S. H. Tauber-arp
- Julian Trevelyan
- Toyen

The following individuals exhibited objects:

- André Breton
- Gala Dalí
- Claude Cahun
- Hugh Sykes Davies
- Rouge Dragon
- Eric Neville Geijer
- Geoffrey Grigson
- Diana Brinton Lee
- Sheila Legge
- Margaret Nash
- Herbert Read
- Roger Roughton
- Jean Varda

The following nations were represented at the exhibition:

- America
- Austria
- Belgium
- Czecho-Slovakia
- Denmark
- France
- Germany
- Great Britain
- Greece
- Italy
- Roumania
- Spain
- Sweden
- Switzerland

== Exhibition programming ==
The exhibition was officially opened in the presence of about two thousand people by André Breton. The average attendance for the entire run of the Exhibition was about a thousand people per day.

Over the course of the Exhibition, the following lectures were delivered to large audiences:

- 16 June – André Breton – Limites non-frontières du Surréalisme.
- 19 June – Herbert Read – Art and the Unconscious.
- 24 June – Paul Éluard – La Poésie surréaliste.
- 26 June – Hugh Sykes Davies – Biology and Surrealism.
- 1 July – Salvador Dalí – Fantômes paranoïaques authentiques.

The most iconic image of the exhibition is the opening day performance of Sheila Legge, who stood in the middle of Trafalgar Square, posing in a white, drop tail hemmed wedding dress ensemble inspired by a Salvador Dalí painting, with her head completely obscured by a flower arrangement. In one variation of the images capturing her performance, pigeons are perched on her outstretched, gloved arms.

Dalí's lecture was delivered whilst wearing a deep-sea diving suit. Nearly suffocating during the presentation, Dalí had to be rescued by the young poet David Gascoyne, who arrived with a spanner to release him from the diving helmet. During the exhibition, Welsh poet Dylan Thomas carried around a cup of boiled string, asking visitors would they rather it "weak or strong?"

The exhibition's catalog (and guide) was printed by the Women's Printing Society, a British publishing house dedicated to employing women.

== Legacy ==
In a survey of Surrealist group exhibitions, art historian Yuko Ishii includes the 1937 Japanese touring exhibition Kaigai Chōgenjitsushugi Sakuhinten in a chronology that follows the 1936 London show and precedes the 1938 Paris Exposition Internationale du Surréalisme. More recently, the catalogue for the international survey exhibition Surrealism Beyond Borders (2021–2022) treats the Copenhagen and London Surrealist exhibitions as key early models of Surrealist exhibition-making, presenting them as a pattern for communicating Surrealist ideas and affirming communal activity. The catalogue also reproduces an installation view of the 1936 London exhibition photographed by Roland Penrose.

== Sources ==
- International Surrealist Bulletin, Number 4, September 1936
