= John Melville =

English painter

John Melville, Landscape (1937), watercolour and conte chalk on paper

John William Melville (25 August 1902 – 8 December 1986) was a self-taught British Surrealist painter. He is described by Michel Remy in his book Surrealism in Britain as one of the "harbingers of surrealism" in Great Britain.

He was, along with his art critic brother Robert Melville and the artist Conroy Maddox, a key member of the Birmingham Surrealists from the 1930s to the 1950s. His choice of subjects as a painter was wide; he painted figures, portraits, still-life and landscapes. He painted in oil and watercolor. He was self-taught. He was attracted to Surrealism in 1930 and as a member of the Birmingham Group, joined the Surrealist Group in 1938. He was a contributor to the London Bulletin in 1939, and to Arson in 1942.

John had his debut exhibition in London at the Wertheim Gallery in 1932. He continued to exhibit in other venues in London and throughout the UK. His work is represented in a number of private and public collections. His paintings often showed transformed figures and a dream-like, unexpected conjunction of images. During the 1940s, he painted portraits and still-life but later returned to Surrealism.

Melville's relative isolation led to his work being somewhat neglected. However, in recent years his reputation has grown and his singular style has led to his inclusion in a number of public exhibitions – notably "Surrealism: Two Private Eyes" at the Guggenheim, New York in 1999 and "Surrealism in Birmingham" in 2001.
