= Walter Allen =

English literary critic and novelist

Allen in January 1959.

Walter Ernest Allen (23 February 1911 – 28 February 1995) was an English literary critic and novelist and one of the Birmingham Group of authors. He is best known for his classic study The English Novel: a Short Critical History (1951).

== Life and career ==
Allen was born in Aston, Birmingham; he drew on his working-class roots for All in a Lifetime (1959), generally considered his best novel. He was educated at King Edward's Grammar School at Aston and the University of Birmingham, graduating in 1932—his friends at that period included Henry Reed and Louis MacNeice.

He taught and took numerous temporary academic positions. In 1935, he was a Visiting Lecturer in English at the University of Iowa, Iowa City; from 1955 to 1956 he was visiting professor of English at Coe College, Cedar Rapids, Iowa; from 1963 to 1964 he was visiting professor of English, Vassar College, Poughkeepsie, New York, and in 1967 he was at University of Kansas, Lawrence, and University of Washington, Seattle. He also worked in journalism, being at one time literary editor of the New Statesman; and was a broadcaster. In 1967 he took a position as Professor of English Studies at the New University of Ulster.

Allen published many novels early in his career mostly dealing with the life of the working class in England. As I Walked Down New Grub Street which accounts his meetings with prominent literary figures was published in 1982. After a significant break from fiction-writing for 27 years he published Get Out Early in 1986. He was known as an editor of George Gissing. He wrote some poetry, which appeared in John Lehmann's publications in the 1940s. He left much writing in manuscript. He died in London.

== Works ==
=== Novels ===
- Innocence is Drowned (1938)
- Blind Man's Ditch (1939)
- Living Space (1940)
- The Black Country (1946)
- Rogue Elephant (1946)
- Dead Man Over All (1950)
- All in a Lifetime (1959) [U.S. title: Three Score and Ten]
- Get Out Early (1986)
- Accosting Profiles (1989)

=== Short stories ===
- The Festive Baked-Potato Cart (1948)

=== Criticism ===
- Writers on Writing (1948), editor
- Reading a Novel (1949)
- Arnold Bennett (1949) The English Novelists series
- Joyce Cary (1953)
- The English Novel; a Short Critical History (1954)
- The Novel To-day (1955)
- Six Great Novelists (1955)
- George Eliot (1964)
- Tradition and Dream: The English and American Novel from the Twenties to Our Time (1964)
- The Urgent West (1969)
- The Short Story in English (1981)

=== Autobiography ===
- As I Walked Down New Grub Street (1981)

== Archives ==
Papers of Walter Allen are held at the Cadbury Research Library (University of Birmingham).
