= E. L. T. Mesens =

Belgian artist and writer (1903–1971)

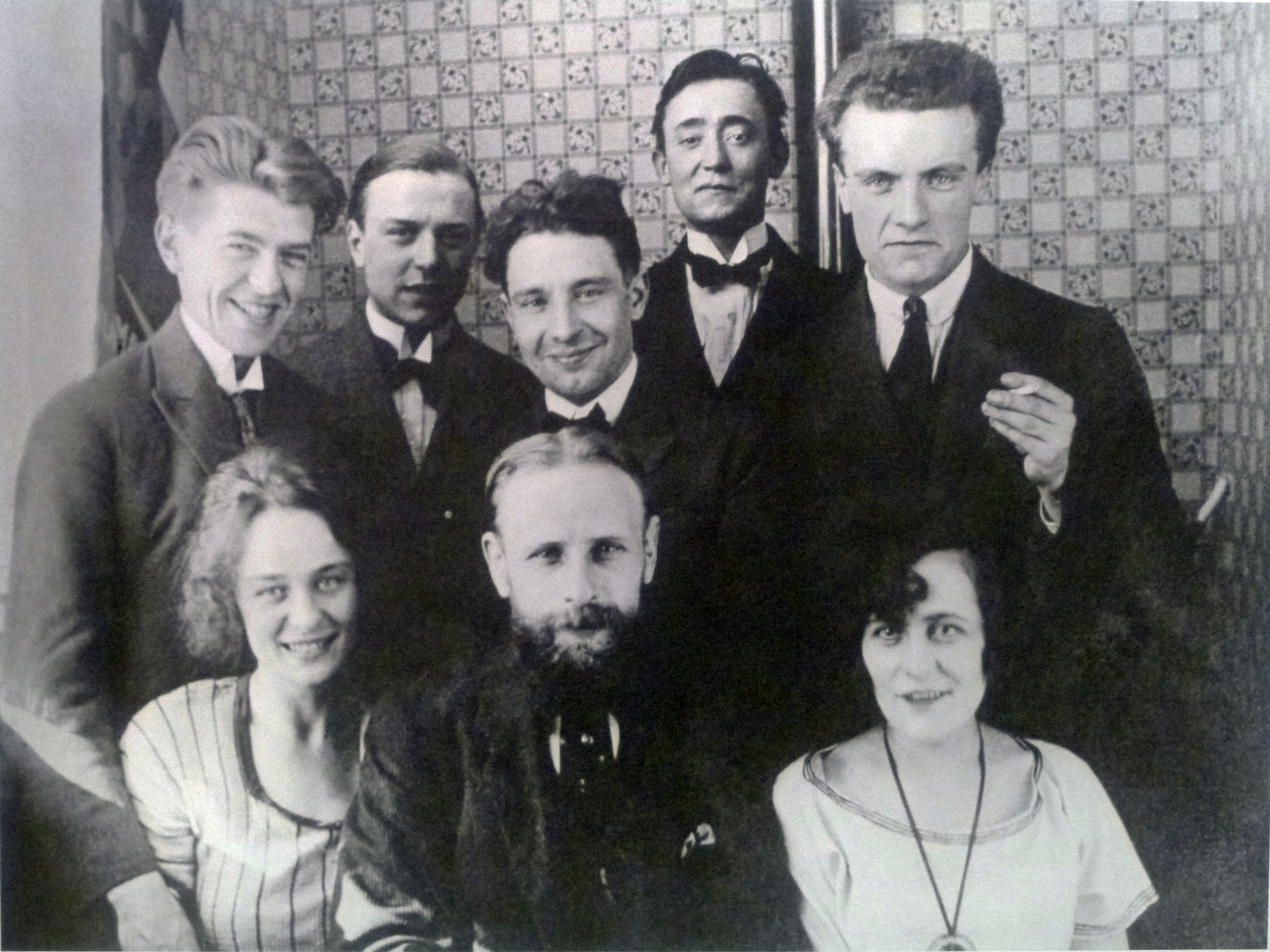
- Belgian artists at the home of Victor Servranckx (June 1922); from left to right: (top) René Magritte, E.L.T. Mesens, Victor Servranckx, Pierre-Louis Flouquet, Pierre Bourgeois; (bottom) Georgette Berger, Pierre Broodcoorens, Henriette Flouquet
- Born: Édouard Léon Théodore Mesens; 27 November 1903; Brussels, Belgium
- Died: 13 May 1971 (aged 67); Brussels, Belgium
- Occupations: artist, writer
- Known for: Belgian Surrealist movement

Édouard Léon Théodore Mesens (27 November 1903 – 13 May 1971) was a Belgian artist and writer associated with the Belgian Surrealist movement.

== Biography ==
Mesens was born in Brussels, Belgium. He started his artistic career as a musician influenced by Erik Satie and an author of dadaist poems. He was a publisher of the books Œesophage and Marie with his lifetime friend and soulmate René Magritte. His activity as one of the leaders of the surrealist movement in Belgium was eased by him being an owner of a gallery, where he organised the first surrealist exhibition in Belgium in 1934. He also went to co-organise the London International Surrealist Exhibition, which made him settle in London. There he became the director of the London Gallery (which he ran during the late 1930s and after the war with Roland Penrose) and the chief editor of the London Bulletin (1938–1940), which was one of the most important bulletins among the English-language Surrealist periodicals.

Mesens died in 1971 following a "long, lingering, painful illness". According to an obituary published by poet and historian Franklin Rosemont, Mesens committed "suicide by absinthe", drinking himself to death by wilfully disregarding doctors' orders to abstain from alcohol.

== Works ==
- Alphabet sourd aveugle - Flamel, Brussels - with preface and a note by Paul Éluard (1933)
- Troisième Front - London Gallery Editions (1944)
- Free Unions - Unions Libres - Directed by Simon Watson Taylor (1946)
- The Cubist Spirit in Its Time - London Gallery Editions - with Robert Melville (1947)
- Poèmes, 1923–1958 - Le Terrain Vague (1959)
