= Conroy Maddox =

British artist (1912–2005)

- Born: 27 December 1912; Ledbury, Herefordshire, England
- Died: 14 January 2005 (aged 92); London, England
- Known for: Painting
- Movement: Surrealism

Conroy Maddox (27 December 1912 – 14 January 2005) was an English surrealist painter, collagist, writer and lecturer; and a key figure in the Birmingham Surrealist movement.

He was born in Ledbury, Herefordshire, and discovered surrealism in 1935, spending the rest of his life exploring its potential through his paintings, collages, photographs, objects and texts. Inspired by artists such as Max Ernst, Óscar Domínguez and Salvador Dalí, he rejected academic painting in favour of techniques that expressed the surrealistic spirit of rebellion. Maddox officially joined the British Surrealist Group in 1938.

His creations soon began not only to challenge the conventional view of reality, but also to push pictorial expression to the limits of consciousness. He was even implicated in both scandal and controversy when, during World War II, Scotland Yard suspected him of fifth columnist sabotage and mounted a surprise raid to seize works thought to contain coded messages to the enemy.

Following the war he moved to Balsall Heath and began his most active period. In 1948, he married Nan Burton. They had a daughter and a son together, but had the marriage dissolved in 1955. He died in London, aged 92.

== Exhibitions ==
- 1938 - Wertheim Gallery, London
- 1940 - London Gallery, London
- 1940 - Surrealism Today, Zwemmer Gallery, London
- 1940 - Artists International Association
- 1945 - Leicester Galleries, London
- 1947 - International Surrealist Exhibition, Paris
- 1949 - Royal Birmingham Society of Artists Galleries
- 1949 - Bilston Corporation Art Gallery
- 1951 - Royal Birmingham Society of Artists Galleries
- 1963 - Grabowski Gallery, London
- 1967 - Zwemmer Gallery, London
- 1967 - Exeter City Gallery, Exeter
- 1973 - Hamet Gallery, London
- 1976 - Gouaches of the 1940s, Fischer Fine Art, London
- 1978 - Surrealism Unlimited, Camden Arts Centre, London
- 1982 - Peinture Surrealiste en Angleterre 1930-1960, Galerie 1900–2000, Paris
- 1994 - Paintings and Objects, Gallery M, London
- 2000 - Surrealism in Birmingham 1935-1955, Birmingham Museums
- 2001 - Conroy Maddox. A Surrealist Odyssey, Belgrave Gallery, London

== Bibliography ==
- Free Unions - Unions Libre - edited by Simon Watson Taylor and with cover by Conroy Maddox (1946)
- Dali by Conroy Maddox (Taschen)
