= David Scherman =

American photojournalist and editor (1916-1997)

David E. Scherman
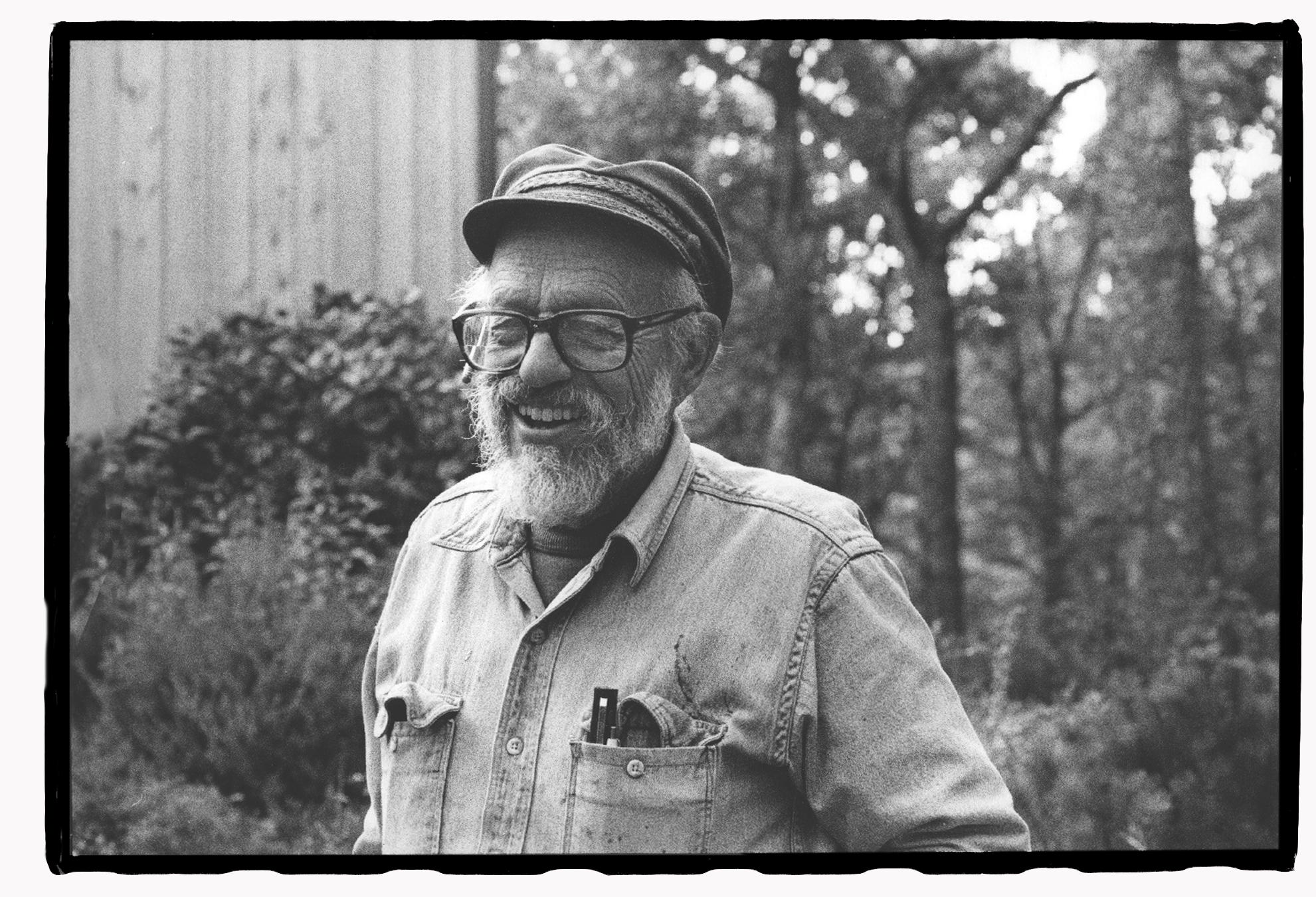
- Born: David Edward Scherman; March 2, 1916; Manhattan, New York U.S.
- Died: May 5, 1997 (aged 81); Stony Point, New York
- Education: Dartmouth College
- Known for: Photojournalism, editing
- Notable work: The Best of Life, 1973
- Spouse: Rosemarie Redlich (1949)
- Partner: Lee Miller (1942-1946)

David E. Scherman (March 2, 1916 – May 5, 1997) was an American photographer, photojournalist, and editor. He is known for his coverage of World War II, being one of the first journalists to discover and photograph the Buchenwald and Dachau concentration camps and Adolf Hitler's Munich apartment.

Some of the noted personalities Scherman photographed include Ernest Hemingway, Queen Elizabeth, General Dwight D. Eisenhower, Fred Astaire, Jean-Paul Sartre, Simone De Beauvoir, among many others. He was the longest-serving staff member of Life Magazine.

== Biography ==
=== Early life ===
David Edward Scherman was born on March 2, 1916, in Manhattan, to a Jewish family. He was the younger of two sons of Celia (née Harris) and William S. Scherman, a businessman. He grew up in New Rochelle, New York and attended Dartmouth College. Newly graduated, Scherman bought a Leica camera and got hired as a copy boy by Time Life. He quickly impressed editors with his photography and became a photojournalist for LIFE.

=== SS Zamzam and World War II ===
At age 25, Scherman was traveling aboard the Egyptian ocean liner SS Zamzam, en route to Cape Town on assignment for Life magazine, when the ship was sunk in April 1941 by the Atlantis, a German merchant raider. He discreetly photographed the attack from a lifeboat and smuggled four rolls of film to LIFE, hidden inside a toothpaste container and a tube of shaving cream. His images enabled the British to locate and sink the Atlantis, securing the rescue and repatriation of the American passengers.

He covered the arrival of US troops in Northern Ireland in 1942, the Normandy landings in June 1944 for Life, joining Robert Capa, George Rodger, Robert Landry, John G. Morris, Ralph Morse, and Frank Scherschel) as Allied troops advanced into western France. He was particularly influenced by Capa's approach to war photography, which emphasized proximity to the subject as essential to capturing powerful images. During his time as a war correspondent, he was shot down in an observation plane over Germany and managed to survive two light plane crashes.

=== Partnership with Lee Miller ===
While working in London for Life, Scherman shared a flat in Hampstead with Condé Nast Publications photographer Lee Miller and her partner, the Surrealist artist Roland Penrose. The arrangement marked the beginning of their close personal relationship and professional collaboration. Scherman is credited with encouraging Miller to seek accreditation as a war correspondent for Vogue.

In 1944, David Scherman and Lee Miller left London. They lived together at the Hôtel Scribe in Paris and teamed up for many assignments, most notably the siege of Saint-Malo, the liberation of Paris, and the liberation of Buchenwald and Dachau.

On April 30, 1945, Scherman and Miller entered Adolf Hitler's Munich apartment ahead of the allied forces. While they were there, news broke of Hitler's surrender and suicide in Berlin. One photograph by Scherman of Miller in the bathtub of Adolf Hitler's apartment in Munich is one of the most iconic images from the Miller-Scherman partnership.

=== Post-war work and personal life ===
Scherman wed journalist and researcher Rosemarie Redlich in 1949, with whom he had two sons. Together, Scherman and Redlich traveled across the United States and published Literary America: A Chronicle of American Writers from 1607 to 1952, a book of photographs and essays about American authors and the landscapes that inspired them.

Scherman was promoted to editor, and also worked as a film, television, and book reviewer for Life magazine. He was employed as a senior editor when Life ceased its weekly format in 1972. He wrote and edited the best-selling book The Best of Life (1973), and the anthology Life Goes to the Movies (1975).

His nephew is photojournalist Rowland Scherman.

==== Retirement ====
After Life entirely ceased publication, Scherman retired, and built dozens of houses for friends and family in Cape Cod, Long Island, Rockland, and New Jersey.

His final writing assignment was the foreword to Lee Miller's War, a collection of Miller's letters, photographs, and manuscripts from World War II edited by Miller's son Antony Penrose.

Scherman died of cancer on May 5, 1997, at age 81.

== In popular culture ==
David E. Scherman was portrayed by the actor Andy Samberg in the 2023 drama film Lee.

== See also ==
- Notable contributors to Life

== Publications ==
Scherman contributed as an editor and author to various Life and photography publications including:

- The Best of Life, 1973, ISBN 978-0-380-00187-3
- With John R. McCrary - First of the Many, 1981, ISBN 978-0-86051-129-8
- With Rosemarie Redlich - Literary America: A Chronicle of American Writers from 1607 to 1952, 1978, ISBN 978-0-8371-8017-5
- With Richard Wilcox - Literary England: Photographs of Places Made Memorable in English Literature, 1944, ISBN 978-0-8495-4978-6
- With Antony Penrose - Lee Miller's War: Photographer and Correspondent With the Allies in Europe 1944-45, 1992, ISBN 978-0-8212-1870-9
