= Lee (2023 film) =

2023 film by Ellen Kuras

- Official poster
- Directed by: Ellen Kuras
- Screenplay by: Liz Hannah; John Collee; Marion Hume
- Story by: Lem Dobbs; Marion Hume; John Collee
- Based on: The Lives of Lee Miller by Antony Penrose
- Produced by: Kate Solomon; Kate Winslet; Troy Lum; Andrew Mason; Marie Savare; Lauren Hantz
- Starring: Kate Winslet; Andy Samberg; Alexander Skarsgård; Marion Cotillard; Andrea Riseborough; Noémie Merlant; Josh O'Connor
- Cinematography: Paweł Edelman
- Edited by: Mikkel E. G. Nielsen
- Music by: Alexandre Desplat
- Production companies: Sky Original; Brouhaha Entertainment; Juggle Films
- Distributed by: Sky Cinema; StudioCanal
- Release dates: 9 September 2023 (Toronto International Film Festival); 13 September 2024 (United Kingdom)
- Running time: 116 minutes
- Country: United Kingdom
- Language: English
- Box office: $24.6 million

Lee is a 2023 British biographical war drama film directed by Ellen Kuras in her feature directorial debut, from a screenplay by Liz Hannah, John Collee and Marion Hume, and story from Hume, Collee and Lem Dobbs, adapted from the 1985 biography The Lives of Lee Miller by Antony Penrose. It stars Kate Winslet as WWII journalist Lee Miller. The cast includes Marion Cotillard, Andrea Riseborough, Andy Samberg, Noémie Merlant, Josh O'Connor and Alexander Skarsgård in supporting roles.

The movie took eight years to make and, at one point, due to precarious funding, Winslet (who also produced the movie) paid the entire cast and crew's salaries for two weeks. The film made its world premiere at the Toronto International Film Festival on 9 September 2023. It was released theatrically in the United Kingdom by Sky Cinema on 13 September 2024.

Lee received generally positive reviews from critics and became Sky UK's highest-grossing original film. It grossed $24.6 million worldwide. For her performance in the film, Winslet received nominations for Best Actress at the Golden Globe Awards and AACTA International Awards. Additionally, the film received a nomination from BAFTA for Outstanding British Film.

== Plot ==
In 1977, Lee Miller tells her life story to an interviewer, and it is depicted in a series of flashbacks.

In 1937, Miller is a former New York City fashion model and aspiring photographer living a bohemian lifestyle in France when she meets and falls in love with Roland Penrose. She later moves with Penrose to London, and gains employment with British Vogue magazine during World War II, photographing Britons during The Blitz. Her ability to further document the war is restricted, due to the United Kingdom barring women from serving near combat. However, after the United States enters the war in late 1941, Miller is assigned as a war correspondent alongside photojournalist David Scherman.

Following the Normandy landings in June 1944, Miller photographs combat during the Battle of Saint-Malo, unknowingly recording the first wartime use of napalm. During the Liberation of Paris, she photographs members of the French Resistance publicly shaming French women who collaborated with the Germans. Miller finds her distraught friend Solange d'Ayen, who recently survived imprisonment and whose husband is still missing. Miller also reconnects with friends Nusch Éluard and Paul Éluard, who inform her that thousands of people had gone missing during the German occupation.

Miller and Scherman enter Nazi Germany, travelling the frontlines via Jeep and photographing their experiences. They document the immediate aftermath of atrocities committed at Buchenwald and Dachau. In April 1945, shortly prior to Germany's surrender, Scherman photographs Miller in the bathtub at Adolf Hitler's Munich apartment.

Returning to Britain, and with Penrose also home from the war, Miller is furious when she discovers her photographs of the concentration camps were not published. Editor Audrey Withers explains the British censor prevented it, worried the photographs would distress an already traumatised population. Miller and Penrose marry in 1947; their son Antony is born soon after.

The interviewer is revealed to be Antony, who only recently learned of his mother's wartime experience. Antony and Miller discuss his turbulent upbringing, including the effect of Miller's post-traumatic stress disorder and alcoholism on his adolescence. It is revealed that Miller is already dead, and the interview was in Antony's imagination. A postscript to the film states that, following the death of his mother, thousands of photographs and manuscripts were discovered in Miller's attic, out of which Antony and his wife Suzanna created the Lee Miller Archives.

== Cast ==
- Kate Winslet as Lee Miller
- Andy Samberg as David Scherman
- Alexander Skarsgård as Roland Penrose
- Marion Cotillard as Solange d'Ayen
- Andrea Riseborough as Audrey Withers
- Noémie Merlant as Nusch Éluard
- Josh O'Connor as Antony Penrose
- James Murray as Colonel Spencer
- Arinzé Kene as Major Jonesy
- Vincent Colombe as Paul Éluard
- Patrick Mille as Jean D'Ayen
- Samuel Barnett as Cecil Beaton
- Zita Hanrot as Ady Fidelin
- Ian Dunnett Jnr as Raymond Hollman
- Joe Anders as Frank Kleeman, American GI

== Production ==
=== Development ===
The project originated when cinematographer Ellen Kuras was at a bookshop in New York and spotted a book about war photographer Lee Miller. Kuras noticed a similarity between Miller and actress Kate Winslet–with whom she had worked in Eternal Sunshine of the Spotless Mind (2004)–and sent Winslet a copy of the book and kept another copy for herself. Years later, Winslet started developing a movie project about Miller and asked Kuras whether she would like to direct it.

The project was officially announced in October 2015, with Winslet attached to star as Miller. In June 2020, Kuras was set to direct the film–her feature directorial debut, with Liz Hannah adapting the screenplay from the 1985 biography The Lives of Lee Miller, written by Miller's son, Antony Penrose, who supported the film and gave Kuras full access to his mother's personal archives, diaries, and even her unpublished work. The screenplay went through several rewrites. It was originally written by John Collee and Marion Hume from a story they developed together with Lem Dobbs, with Liz Hannah joining on later. Winslet also served as a producer on the film. She chose the screenwriters and was also in charge of finances and casting, even personally calling her co-stars.

The most significant development in the film came in October 2021, when Marion Cotillard, Jude Law, Andrea Riseborough and Josh O'Connor joined the cast, with a crew including Alexandre Desplat as a composer, Michael O'Connor as costume designer, cinematographer Paweł Edelman and Ivana Primorac as head makeup and hair artist. In February 2022, Andy Samberg was announced as being part of the cast. He would be confirmed in October 2022 alongside additional castings including Alexander Skarsgård, who replaced Law in the role of Roland Penrose. Winslet wrote a letter to Cotillard asking her to play French Vogue editor Solange d'Ayen in the film. Winslet and Cotillard had previously co-starred in Contagion (2011).

Winslet said she was patronized by male executives when she was trying to get funding for the film. "The men who think you want and need their help are unbelievably outraging. I've even had a director say to me: 'Listen, you do my film, and I'll get your little Lee funded...' Little! Or we'd have potential male investors saying things like: Tell me, why am I supposed to like this woman?", Winslet told Vogue. During pre-production, Winslet covered two weeks of wages with her own money due to insufficient funds.

=== Filming ===
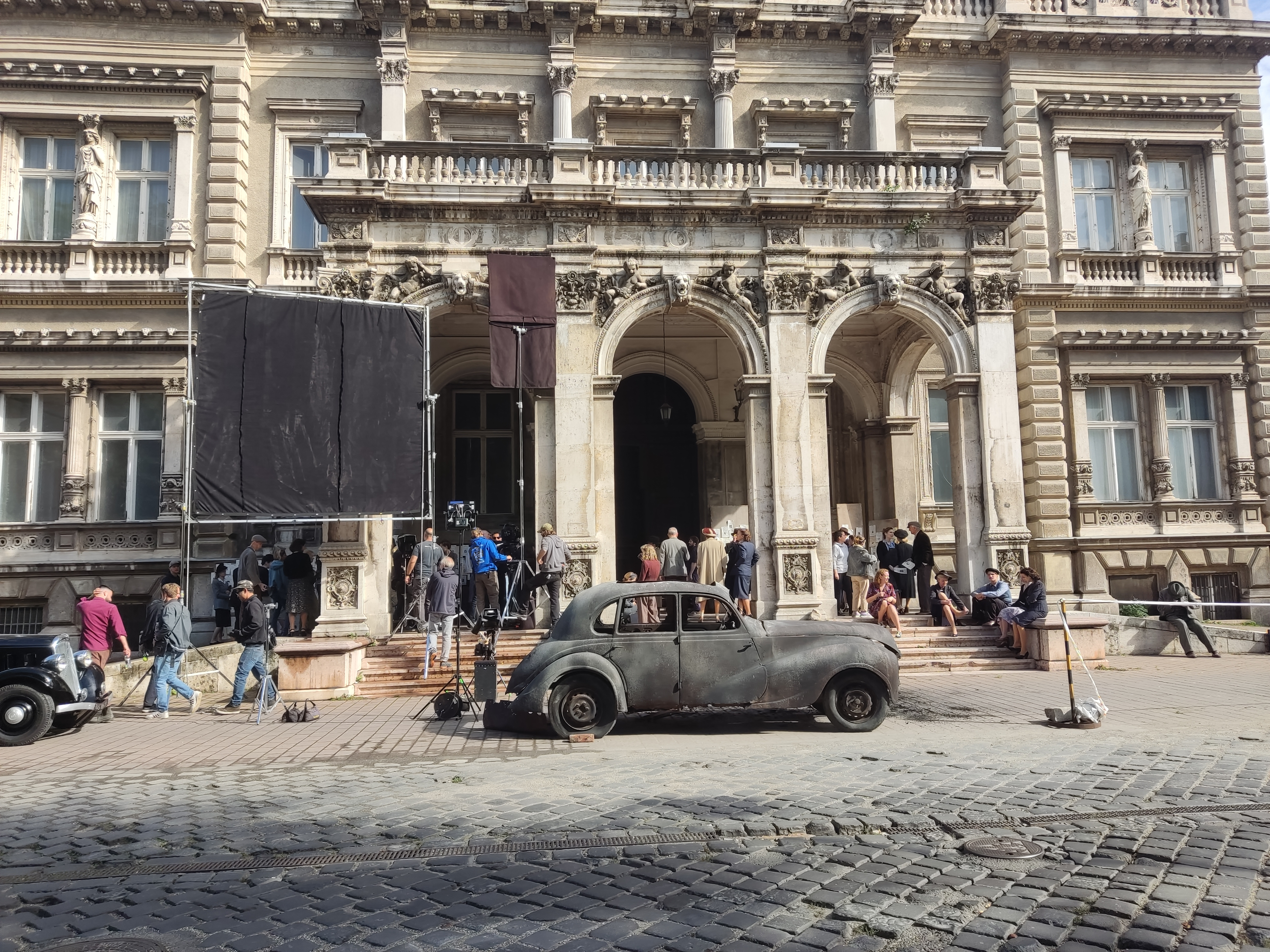
Filming in Budapest, October 2022

Filming began in late September 2022 in Croatia. Production paused for a short period that month when Winslet was taken to hospital. Winslet had an accident on the first day of shooting when she slipped and injured her back while rehearsing a sequence where Lee Miller is running down the street in Saint-Malo under bombardment. Winslet decided to keep filming despite her back injury and barely being able to stand up.

Filming also took place in Hungary and wrapped in early December 2022.

The recreation of Lee Miller's photo washing herself in Adolf Hitler's bathtub was taken by photographer Annie Leibovitz, who was recommended to Winslet by Vogue's then-editor-in-chief, Anna Wintour.

=== Music ===
The film's score was composed by Alexandre Desplat. Winslet oversaw the recording of the score at Abbey Road Studios in London. While in the studio, Winslet recognised a familiar face in the orchestra: Jonathan Evans-Jones, who played Wallace Hartley, the violinist from the Titanic in the film Titanic (1997), which Winslet starred in, marking their first reunion since shooting the film and the first time they spoke to each other. Their reunion was later featured in the television show 60 Minutes in 2024.

== Release ==
The film was originally set to be released theatrically in 2023, but it had to be postponed due to the 2023 SAG-AFTRA strike, which prevented actors who were members of the union from promoting films. Lee had its world premiere at the Toronto International Film Festival on 9 September 2023. It was released theatrically by Sky Cinema in the United Kingdom and Ireland on 13 September 2024. In February 2024, Roadside Attractions and Vertical acquired US distribution rights to the film, originally scheduling the film for a theatrical release on 20 September 2024. The film's release was subsequently delayed by a week to 27 September.

== Reception ==
=== Box office ===
The film was released to 605 cinemas in the United Kingdom and debuted at number 3 at the box office, grossing $926,064 in its first weekend. For its second weekend, the film was expanded to 40 more cinemas and grossed $2,4 million.

Lee is Sky UK's highest-grossing original film at the UK box office. The film grossed $5.8 million in the United Kingdom, $5.3 million in France, $4.1 million in Germany, $2.8 million in Australia, $2 million in the United States, $1.1 million in the Netherlands, and a total of $24.6 million worldwide.

=== Critical response ===
On the review aggregator website Rotten Tomatoes, 68% of 153 critics' reviews are positive. The website's consensus reads: "Kate Winslet's gripping performance in the title role helps elevate Lee beyond its disappointingly conventional biopic trappings." Metacritic, which uses a weighted average, assigned the film a score of 62 out of 100, based on 30 critics, indicating "generally favorable" reviews.

=== Accolades ===
| Year | Award / Festival | Category | Recipient(s) | Result | Ref. |
|---|---|---|---|---|---|
| 2023 | Camerimage | Golden Frog - Main Competition | Pawel Edelman | Nominated | |
| 2024 | Women in Film Honors | Crystal Award for Advocacy in Film | Kate Winslet and Ellen Kuras | Won | |
| 2024 | British Independent Film Awards | Best Cinematography | Pawel Edelman | Nominated | |
| 2024 | British Independent Film Awards | Best Effects | Glen McGuigan and Ingo Putze | Nominated | |
| 2024 | British Independent Film Awards | Best Sound | Mike Prestwood Smith, Csaba Major and Jimmy Boyle | Nominated | |
| 2025 | Golden Globe Awards | Best Actress in a Motion Picture – Drama | Kate Winslet | Nominated | |
| 2025 | AACTA International Awards | Best Actress | Kate Winslet | Nominated | |
| 2025 | Casting Society of America Awards | Feature Studio or Independent – Drama | Lucy Bevan and Olivia Grant | Nominated | |
| 2025 | British Academy Film Awards | Outstanding British Film | Kate Winslet, Ellen Kuras, Kate Solomon, Liz Hannah, Marion Hume, John Coll and Lem Dobbs | Nominated | |
| 2025 | Women Film Critics Circle | Best Movie About Women | Lee | Nominated | |
| 2025 | Women Film Critics Circle | Best Movie By a Woman | Ellen Kuras | Runner-up | |
| 2025 | Women Film Critics Circle | Best Actress | Kate Winslet (Note: Tied with Pamela Anderson for The Last Showgirl (2024).) | Runner-up | |
