= Nusch Éluard =

French artist and model

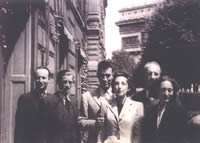
Sherban Sidèry, Pierre Leyris, Hubert de Saint Sennay, Nusch Éluard, Paul Éluard, and Susana Soca on the day of the Liberation of Paris.

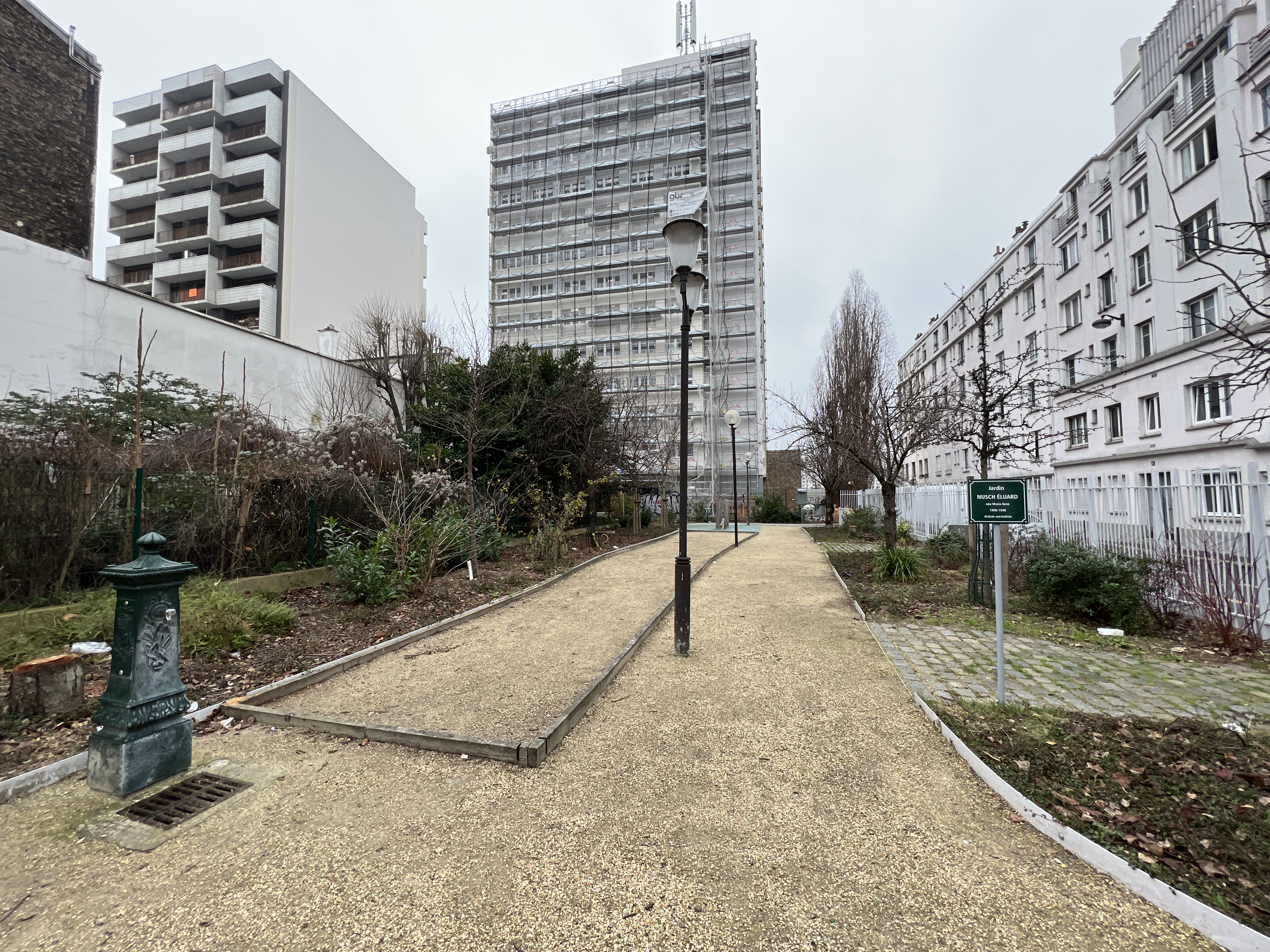
Jardin Nusch-Éluard, 18th arrondissement of Paris

Nusch Éluard (born Maria Benz; 21 June 1906 – 28 November 1946) was a French performer, model and surrealist artist.

Born Maria Benz in Mulhouse (then part of the German Empire), she met Swiss architect and artist Max Bill in the Odeon Café in Zürich; he nicknamed her "Nusch", a name she would stick to. Their liaison ended after six months when Max Bill's plan to marry her in order to avoid her pending extradition from Switzerland was vetoed by his father (to whom he owed a substantial amount of money due to medical expenses following an accident which had forced him to leave the Bauhaus).

== Paris ==
In Paris, on May 21, 1930, in Galeries Lafayette on the boulevard Haussmann, Nusch, then an extra at the Grand Guignol, met Paul Éluard with René Char, both of whom later offer her croissants in the café at the corner of the Rue de la Chaussée-d'Antin and Boulevard Haussmann. Paul Éluard brought her home.

In 1937, at the early summer, Roland Penrose rented his brother's house at Lambe Creek in Cornwall, on the shore of the Truro River, across from Malpas, Cornwall. Penrose was joined by Lee Miller, Max Ernst, Leonora Carrington, Man Ray, Ady Fidelin, Paul Éluard, Nusch Éluard, E.L.T. Mesens, Eileen Agar, Joseph Bard and Henry Moore.

Nusch arrived in France as a stage performer, variously described as a small-time actress, a traveling acrobat, and a "hypnotist's stooge". She met Paul Éluard in 1934 working as a model, married him four months later, produced surrealist photomontage and other work, and is the subject of "Facile," a collection of Éluard's poetry published as a photogravure book, illustrated with Man Ray's nude photographs of her.

She was also the subject of several cubist portraits and sketches by Pablo Picasso in the late 1930s, and is said to have had an affair with him. Nusch worked for the French Resistance during the Nazi occupation of France during World War II. She died in 1946 in Paris as the result of a stroke.

== Photographs and paintings ==
- Dora Maar: "Les années vous guettent" The years await you (Nusch Éluard), 1932
- Man Ray: Nusch Éluard, 1934
- Man Ray, Paul Éluard: Facile, 1935 ()
- Man Ray: Nusch Éluard, 1936
- Man Ray: Sonia Mossé & Nusch Éluard, 1936
- Man Ray: Lee Miller & Nusch Éluard, 1930s
- Man Ray: Ady & Nusch Éluard, 1937
- Man Ray: Ady Fidelin & Nusch Éluard, 1937
- Man Ray: Adrienne Fidelin & Nusch Éluard, 1937
- Pablo Picasso: Nusch Éluard, Charcoal & pencil on canvas, 1938
