= Ady Fidelin =

French art model (1915–2004)

Adrienne "Ady" Fidelin (March 4, 1915 – February 5, 2004) was a French art model from Guadeloupe, a French island in the Caribbean. She was a romantic partner and model of Man Ray who photographed her hundreds of times. She was the first black model to appear in the American mainstream press during the 1930s.

The New York Times profiled her in 2022. She is played by Zita Hanrot in the 2023 film Lee about photographer Lee Miller. A copy from a 1937 gelatin silver print photograph by Lee Miller of a topless Nusch Eluard, Paul Eluard, Roland Penrose, Man Ray, and a topless Ady Fidelin is at the National Portrait Gallery in London.

== See also ==
- Nusch Éluard
