= Électricité (Man Ray) =

Portfolio by Man Ray

Électricité (English: Electricity) is a photographic series or portfolio by the American photographer Man Ray, created in 1931, for advertising. The series is usually referred by the original French title.

== History and development ==
The series was originally commissioned by the Compagnie Parisienne de Distribution d'Électricité (CPDE), a French electricity company. The pictures were intended to promote the domestic use of electricity, at a time when households were often still dependent on gas, wood or coal.

The portfolio consists of ten photographs, made in the experimental process that Man Ray named "rayographs". They depict the use of various electrical devices of the time. The images were created by placing the devices directly on light-sensitive paper and exposing it to electric light. Man Ray also added five of his own images, including a female nude, representing his mistress, Lee Miller, the moon and a roasted chicken. The series originally had a circulation of 500 and was distributed by the CPDE to managers and special customers. Electricity can be considered a successful expression and merger of both advertising and art.

Jeff L. Rosenheim stated that this portfolio "is a prime example of Man Ray’s experimental style of photography that flourished during the interwar period" and that "“Man Ray strives to make the invisible visible, electricity, creating her visual equivalents: solarization, montage, photogram, to suggest the dynamism of a hidden energy.”

== Public collections ==
Portfolios or photographs from the series are held in several museums, including the Metropolitan Museum of Art, in New York, the National Gallery of Art, in Washington, D.C., the Smithsonian American Art Museum, in Washington, D.C., the Philadelphia Museum of Art, the Victoria and Albert Museum, in London, and the Rijksmuseum, in Amsterdam.
