= 14th AACTA International Awards =

2025 film and television awards

- Date: 7 February 2025
- Site: Home of the Arts, Gold Coast, Queensland
- Hosted by: Russell Crowe

Highlights
- Best Film: Better Man
- Most awards: Better Man (2)
- Most nominations: Better Man / The Brutalist (6)

The 14th Australian Academy of Cinema and Television Arts International Awards, commonly known as the AACTA International Awards, is presented by the Australian Academy of Cinema and Television Arts (AACTA), a non-profit organisation whose aim is to identify, award, promote and celebrate Australia's greatest achievements in film and television. Awards were handed out for the best films of 2024, regardless of the country of origin, and are the international counterpart to the awards for Australian films.

Nominations were announced on 18 December 2024, with Better Man and The Brutalist leading with six each. Winners were announced to the public on 11 February 2025.

The ceremony was broadcast on Channel Ten on 7 February 2025, with an extended version available on Binge and Foxtel the following day on 8 February. Russell Crowe served as the ceremony's host.

== Winners and nominees ==
=== Film ===
Best Film: Better Man; Anora; Dune: Part Two; Emilia Pérez; The Brutalist	Best Direction: Michael Gracey – Better Man; Jacques Audiard – Emilia Pérez; Brady Corbet – The Brutalist; George Miller – Furiosa: A Mad Max Saga; Denis Villeneuve – Dune: Part Two
Best Actor: Ralph Fiennes – Conclave as Cardinal Thomas Lawrence; Adrien Brody – The Brutalist as László Tóth; Daniel Craig – Queer as William Lee; Jonno Davies – Better Man as Robbie Williams; Colman Domingo – Sing Sing as John "Divine G" Whitfield	Best Actress: Nicole Kidman – Babygirl as Romy Mathis; Kirsten Dunst – Civil War as Lee Smith; Karla Sofía Gascón – Emilia Pérez as Emilia Pérez; Mikey Madison – Anora as Anora "Ani" Mikheeva; Kate Winslet – Lee as Lee Miller
Best Supporting Actor: Guy Pearce – The Brutalist as Harrison Lee Van Buren Sr.; Kieran Culkin – A Real Pain as Benji Kaplan; Damon Herriman – Better Man as Nigel Martin-Smith; Stanley Tucci – Conclave as Cardinal Aldo Bellini; Denzel Washington – Gladiator II as Macrinus	Best Supporting Actress: Zoe Saldaña – Emilia Pérez as Rita Mora Castro; Toni Collette – Juror #2 as Faith Killebrew; Ariana Grande – Wicked as Galinda "Glinda" Upland; Felicity Jones – The Brutalist as Erzsébet Tóth; Alison Steadman – Better Man as Betty
Best Screenplay: Jesse Eisenberg – A Real Pain; Sean Baker – Anora; Michael Gracey, Oliver Cole, and Simon Gleeson – Better Man; Peter Straughan – Conclave; Brady Corbet and Mona Fastvold – The Brutalist

=== Television ===
Best Comedy Series: The Bear; Colin from Accounts; Curb Your Enthusiasm; Hacks; Only Murders in the Building	Best Drama Series: Shōgun; After the Party; Boy Swallows Universe; Slow Horses; The Diplomat
Best Actor in a Series: Larry David – Curb Your Enthusiasm as Larry David; Idris Elba – Hijack as Sam Nelson; Gary Oldman – Slow Horses as Jackson Lamb; Hiroyuki Sanada – Shōgun as Lord Yoshii Toranaga; Jeremy Allen White – The Bear as Carmen "Carmy" Berzatto	Best Actress in a Series: Elizabeth Debicki – The Crown as Princess Diana; Ayo Edebiri – The Bear as Sydney Adamu; Jessica Gunning – Baby Reindeer as Martha Scott; Anna Sawai – Shōgun as Toda Mariko; Jean Smart – Hacks as Deborah Vance
