= Farleys House =

Art museum in East Sussex, England

Coordinates: 50.8994°N 0.1985°E

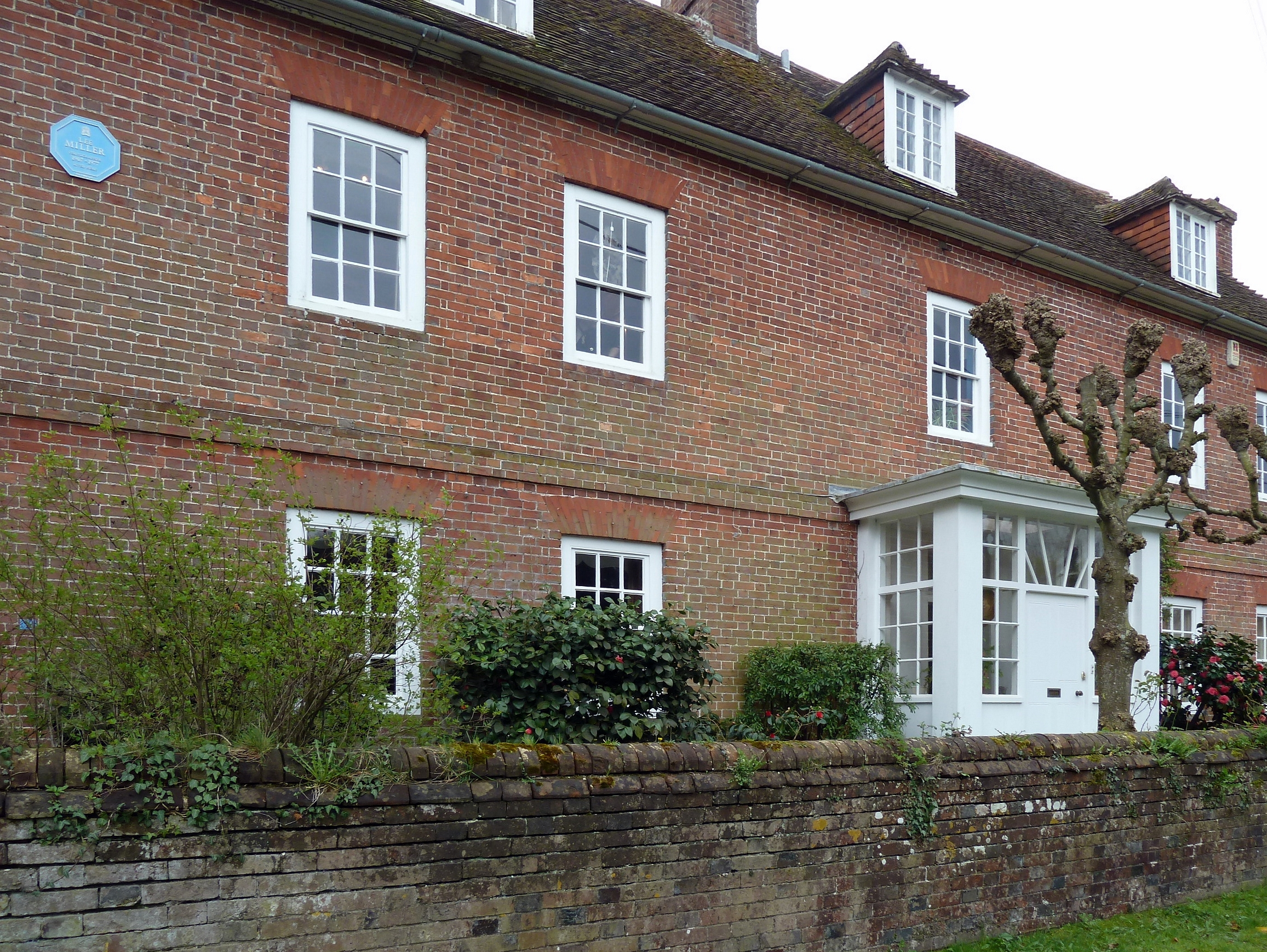
Farleys House & Gallery

Farleys House near Chiddingly, East Sussex, England, has been converted into a museum and archive featuring the lives and work of its former residents, the photographer Lee Miller and the surrealist artist Roland Penrose. It also houses a collection of contemporary art by their friends Pablo Picasso, Man Ray, Max Ernst, and Joan Miró.

== People ==
=== Lee Miller and Roland Penrose ===
Lee Miller and Roland Penrose came to live at Farley Farm in 1949. In the 35 years they lived there, they built up a collection of contemporary art. Many of these works were made by their friends and visitors, including Pablo Picasso, Man Ray, Max Ernst, and Joan Miró. The house is surrounded by a sculpture garden and Miller's vegetable patches.

=== Picasso ===
Picasso visited Miller and Penrose at Farley Farm on 11 and 15 November 1950. On his second visit he created a drawing in Indian ink on two pages of the ICA visitors book (now in the British Museum), of bulls with grasshopper's wings perched on twigs; he had seen William, an Ayrshire bull, that day in the farm's dairy.

== Art galleries ==
The collection and archives are curated by Miller and Penrose's son, the photographer Antony Penrose. A 19th-century barn was converted into a gallery in 2006, and a warehouse building became a larger gallery in 2020. A regularly changing selection of artworks is displayed in the house.

== See also ==
- List of museums devoted to one photographer
