= Antony Penrose =

British photographer (born 1947)

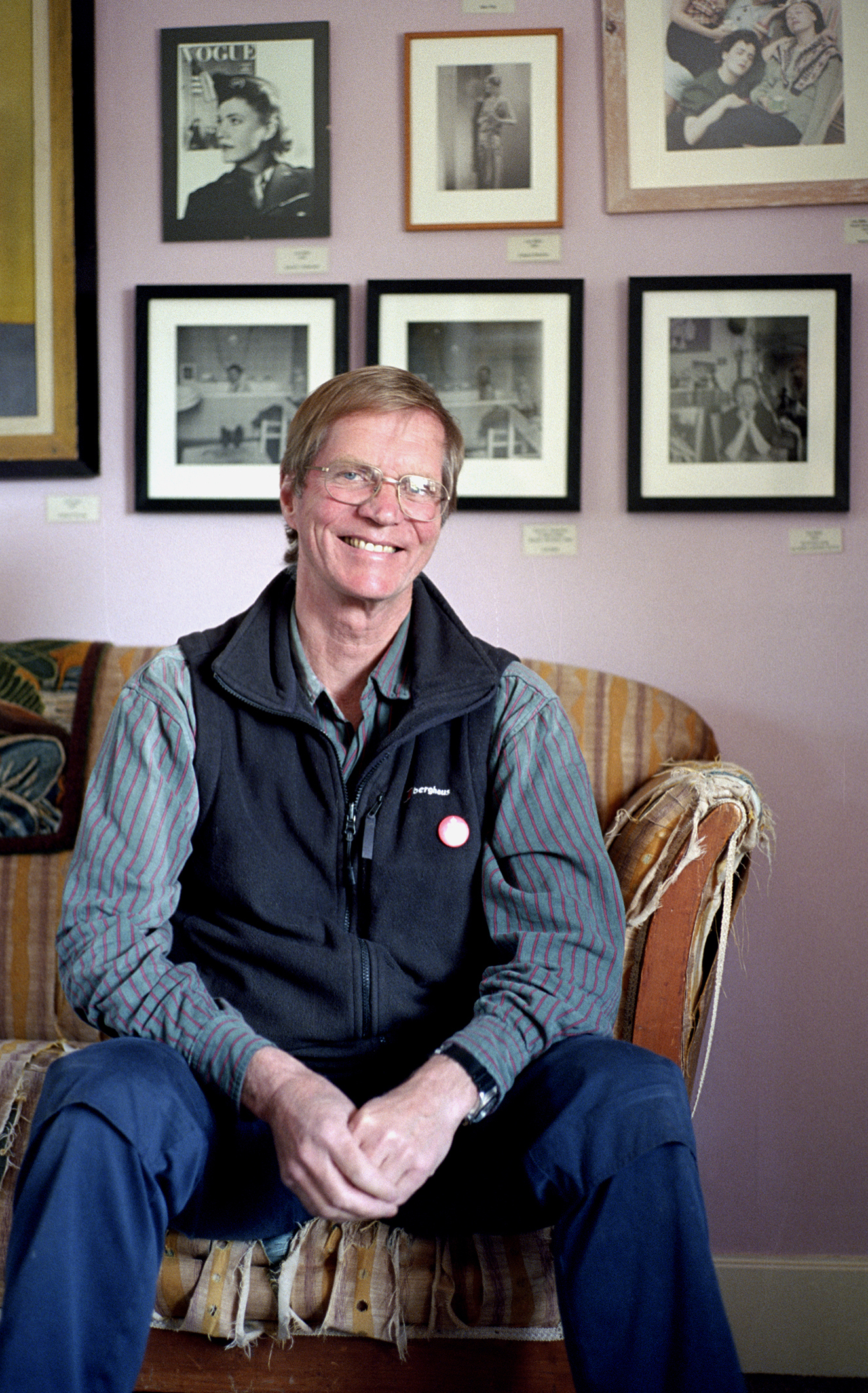
- Born: Antony William Roland Penrose; 9 September 1947 (age 78); London, England
- Known for: Photographer
- Parents: Roland Penrose (father); Lee Miller (mother)
- Relatives: Roger Penrose (cousin); Johnny Miller (uncle)

Antony William Roland Penrose (born 9 September 1947) is a British photographer. The son of Roland Penrose and Lee Miller, Penrose is director of the Lee Miller Archive and Penrose Collection at his parents' former home, Farley Farm House.

== Early life and family ==
Antony Penrose was born on 9 September 1947 in the London Clinic, central London. He is the son of Lee Miller, a model, fine art photographer and noted war correspondent, and Roland Penrose, the surrealist artist, poet and biographer of Pablo Picasso, Joan Miró, Man Ray, and Antoni Tàpies, who co-founded the Institute of Contemporary Arts (ICA) in 1947.

External videos
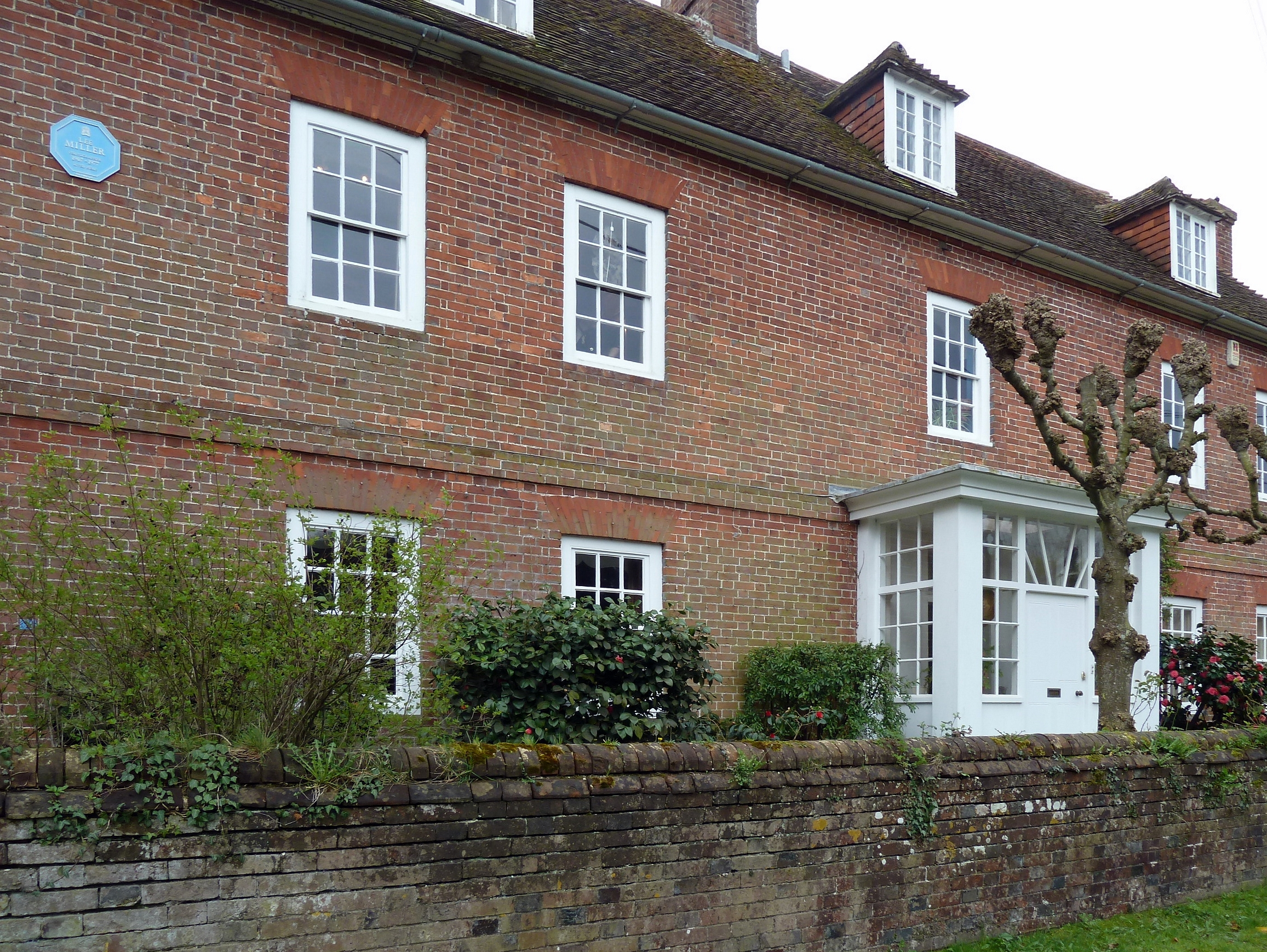
- Farley Farm House
- Man Ray Portraits: Lee Miller's house, tour with Antony Penrose (4:33), TheArtFundUK

His grandfather was Irish painter James Doyle Penrose, and his grandmother was the daughter of the philanthropist Lord Peckover. His uncle was polymath Lionel Penrose, whose children include physicist Oliver Penrose, mathematician and physicist Sir Roger Penrose, chess grandmaster Jonathan Penrose, and geneticist Shirley Hodgson.

He first lived at 11 Downshire Hill in Hampstead north London, but in 1949 his parents bought Farley Farm House, a farmhouse in the village of Chiddingly, East Sussex. His mother had depression during Penrose's childhood, so he was raised by a nanny, Patsy Murray, from a young age. He has dyslexia, but nevertheless went on to attend the Royal Agricultural College.

== Career ==
Penrose's mother was his first mentor and main inspiration. The first camera he used was a Kodak with a 120 roll film, which produced 2 1/4-inch square negatives. At 14, whilst on a family visit, Penrose took some of his first amateur photographs of Picasso. In 1962, he and his mother went on a photography trip to Zimbabwe – but Miller fell ill and so left it to Antony to take pictures, using her Zeiss Contax.

In the late 1960s Penrose took pictures of famous artists including Picasso, Joan Miró and Man Ray. Penrose's first career move was in agriculture, which he interrupted to spend several years on a round-the-world trip in a Land Rover with his friends Robert Braden and Peter Comrie, cousin Dominic Penrose, and his late wife Suzanna. During this period he took many photos for Farmers Weekly magazine. Later on, Penrose was introduced to film-making, working on films such as Kings Horses and Migrate to Survive. He established Penrose Film Productions Ltd which primarily focuses on documentaries, technical films and drama shorts.

Following the death of his mother, a cache of her work was discovered in the attic of the family home by Penrose's late wife Suzanna. It contained some 60,000 negatives, prints and manuscripts, out of which he and Suzanna created the Lee Miller Archives. Penrose has since written numerous books, articles and two plays on the subject of his parents and their associates. He is most notable for his 1985 book, The Lives of Lee Miller.

This biography of his mother is the basis for the 2023 film, Lee, starring Kate Winslet. The discovery of Miller's work is said to have given Penrose a new perspective on his mother, who struggled with post-traumatic stress disorder, alcohol dependence and depression after the war, when he was born and grew up.

Penrose now gives lectures worldwide on photography, fine art and his parents' work to museums and photographic societies and is accredited by the National Association of Decorative and Fine Arts Societies. He is a director of the Farley Arts Trust, a registered charity, which he founded to promote arts education in schools.

The former home of Lee Miller and Roland Penrose, Farleys, has since been converted into a house museum, archive and gallery.

== Publications ==
=== Books ===
- The Lives of Lee Miller. Thames & Hudson, 1988. ISBN 978-0-03-005833-2.
- (editor) Lee Miller's War: Photographer and Correspondent with the Allies in Europe, 1944–45. Condé Nast Books, 1992. ISBN 978-0-8212-1870-9. A book about Miller's photography during World War II.
- The Home of the Surrealists: Lee Miller, Roland Penrose, and Their Circle at Farley Farm. London: Frances Lincoln, 2001. ISBN 978-0-7112-2832-0.
- Roland Penrose: The Friendly Surrealist. Munich, New York: Prestel, 2001. ISBN 978-3-7913-2492-0.
- The Boy Who Bit Picasso. London: Thames & Hudson, 2010. ISBN 978-0-500-23873-8. A children's book about his experiences of Picasso.
- Miró's Magic Animals. London: Thames & Hudson, 2016. ISBN 978-0-500-65066-0. A children's book about his experiences of Miró.

=== Television ===
He presented a documentary titled Lee Miller ou La Traversée du Mirroir, directed by Sylvan Roumette for Arte C7, France. It won Best Portrait Film at the Festival de Montreal 1996.

=== Films ===
He has 18 credits for promotional, documentary films and short features, four of which achieved cinema distribution. Titles include:

- Kings Horses (1977) – associate producer
- Bright Blue Sky for a Ceiling (1979)
- Strange Behaviour (1980) – director
- The Lives of Lee Miller (1985) – contributor

=== Theatre ===
- The Angel and the Fiend: A reading for five voices set to images. First performed in 2003 at the J. Paul Getty Museum.
- Portrait of Space: A reading for six voices set to images. First performed in 2010.
