= Pierre Leyris =

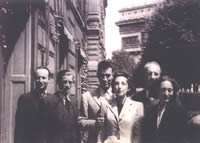
- Pierre Leyris (2nd from left) with Nusch Éluard, Paul Éluard, Sherban Sidèry, Hubert de Saint Sennay et Susana Soca, on the day of the Liberation of Paris.
- Born: 16 July 1907; Ermont
- Died: 4 January 2001 (aged 93); Paris
- Occupation: Translator
- Spouse(s): name unknown, English, three children

Pierre Leyris (16 July 1907 – 4 January 2001) was a French translator.

The writers who benefited from his talent were, among others, Shakespeare in the complete edition of the Club français du livre, Melville, Jean Rhys, Yeats, Dickens, Stevenson, Hawthorne and De Quincey. He was also an incomparable translator of English-speaking poets, from Milton to T.S. Eliot. His four-volume translation of the works of William Blake, published by Aubier & Flammarion, remains the most complete in French and earned him the 1974 Prix Valery Larbaud.

== Biography ==
After studying at lycée Janson-de-Sailly, he appeared in the avant-garde literary circles. In high school he met Pierre Klossowski, who allowed him to meet his brother, the painter Balthus, and the poet Pierre Jean Jouve. By the 1930s, he began his translations on behalf of many publishers. From 1954 to 1961, he edited with Henri Evans a bilingual edition of Shakespeare's Complete Works at Club français du livre.

Long a collection director at the Mercure de France, he published Esquisse d'une anthologie de la poésie américaine du XIXe at Gallimard in 1995. A translator of more than 100 works, he received the National Grand Prix of Translation in 1985, but did not hesitate to "revise" himself after a few years. His mémoires were posthumously published.

== Mémoires ==
- 2002: Pour mémoire : ruminations d'un petit clerc à l'usage de ses frères humains et des vers légataires, Paris, J. Corti, series "Domaine français"
