= Carolyn Burke =

American translator, art critic, and author

Carolyn Burke (born March 29, 1940) is an Australian-born American writer, translator, and author of four biographies. Her first was a life of the English poet Mina Loy, published in 1996 and reprinted in 2021. She has also written books about the American photographer Lee Miller, the French chanteuse Edith Piaf, and the interwoven lives of four iconic figures of American art, Alfred Stieglitz, Georgia O’Keeffe, Paul Strand, and Rebecca Salsbury.

== Early life and education ==
Burke was born in 1940 to Valda Steigrad Katz and David Morris Katz in Sydney, Australia: she came to the U.S. when her mother remarried Dr. Harold Goldberg. Burke earned a B.A. with Highest Honors in French Literature at Swarthmore College (1961); a M.A. (1964) and Ph.D. (1971), both in English and Comparative Literature, at Columbia University. In Paris, where she lived and worked for many years, she studied French at the Sorbonne.

== Early career ==
Burke taught English literature at several colleges and universities including the University of Paris-IV, the University of Lille (France); the University of California, Santa Cruz and Davis (U.S.); the Universities of Sydney and New South Wales (Australia). She co-translated two books by the French psychoanalyst and philosopher Luce Irigaray, co-edited a collection of essays about Irigaray, and published more than twenty articles on French feminist theory and modernist women writers in scholarly journals.

At the invitation of poet Kathleen Fraser, Burke served as a contributing editor at How(ever), a journal of innovative writing by contemporary women poets in dialogue with neglected texts by modernist writers, including Gertrude Stein and Mina Loy.

Burke left academia in 1990 to write full time. Her reviews, essays, and translations have appeared in many periodicals, including The New Yorker, The New York Times, Art in America, Art Press, Critical Inquiry, Heat, Sulfur, La Revue des Deux Mondes, La Nouvelle Revue Française, and La Règle du Jeu.

== Career as biographer ==
Of Burke's first book, Becoming Modern: The Life of Mina Loy, The Washington Post wrote: “An amazing examination of ‘modern life.’” The New Republic noted, “In this superb biography, the first ever, Carolyn Burke does full justice to the mercurial nature of Loy’s temperament, and offers judicious assessments of her work.” The Atlantic Monthly called the book “as much a history of early-twentieth-century aesthetics as it is a biography of a woman who took part in all the turmoil.” Choice called the book “a jewel of the biographer's art.”

Burke's next book, Lee Miller: A Life, was nominated for the 2005 Biography Award by the National Book Critics Circle and translated into French. The New York Sun called the book a “state-of-the-art biography."; The New York Times wrote that it “captures the excitement of Miller’s omnivorous spirit.”; The Daily Telegraph (U.K.) noted, “Lee Miller was an astounding woman, brought memorably to life in this astounding book.”

Burke's third biography, No Regrets: The Life of Edith Piaf, was praised in The New York Times as “concise and gracefully written”; in Booklist: “a perceptive, supportive, even definitive biography”. The reviewer for the UK newspaper Daily Express wrote,“This book pays Piaf the supreme compliment of coming from both the heart and head of its author. You can feel a palpable love for her subject, and there’s also clear-headed analysis of what made Piaf tick.” It has been translated into a number of languages including French.

Burke's next book, Foursome: Alfred Stieglitz, Georgia O’Keeffe, Paul Strand, Rebecca Salsbury was hailed by The Washington Post as “{a} sharp-eyed group portrait of two artistic couples. . . in astute, lucid prose.” The Wall Street Journal called the book “Fascinating. . . . compelling. . . .thoroughly researched and capacious.” The National Book Review observed: “In her deeply researched and richly imagined book, Burke focuses on two marriages in a way that amplifies the personal and artistic lives of a quartet of painters and photographers and magnifies their powerful influence on 20th century art—and on each other.”

== Books ==
=== Biographies ===
- Burke, Carolyn (1996). Becoming Modern: The Life of Mina Loy. Farrar, Straus & Giroux.
- Burke, Carolyn (2021). Becoming Modern: The Life of Mina Loy. Picador reprint.
- Burke, Carolyn (2006). Lee Miller: A Life. Alfred Knopf.
- Burke, Carolyn (2011). No Regrets : The Life of Edith Piaf. Alfred Knopf.
- Burke, Carolyn (2019). Foursome: Alfred Stieglitz, Georgia O'Keeffe, Paul Strand, Rebecca Salsbury. Alfred Knopf. ISBN 9780525655367.

=== Translations and edited collections ===
- Irigaray, Luce. Co-translated with Catherine Porter (1985). This Sex Which Is Not One. Cornell University Press.
- Irigaray, Luce. Co-translated with Gillian Gill (1993). The Ethics of Sexual Difference. Cornell University Press.
- Burke, Carolyn, co-edited with Naomi Schor and Margaret Whitford. (1994). Engaging with Irigaray; Feminist Philosophy and Modern European Thought. Columbia University Press.

== Interviews ==
- Brown, Pam (1998). "Carolyn Burke in conversation with Pam Brown about Mina Loy". Jacket. 5.
- Hogan, Ron (June 18 and June 24, 2006). "Carolyn and Hazel Rowley on the art of biography, their choice of subjects, and their experiences as expat Australian writers". Beatrice.com.
- Laidlaw, Chris (April 29, 2007). "Chris Laidlaw and Carolyn Burke discuss Lee Miller, A Life". Sunday Morning with Chris Laidlaw. Radio New Zealand.
- Pollie, Robert (March 20, 2011). "Robert Pollie's spirited interview with Carolyn Burke interspersed with Piaf's songs, for Santa Cruz NPR affiliate". 7th Avenue Project with Robert Pollie. KUSP Santa Cruz.
- Forrest, Elliott (April 5, 2011). "Elliott Forrest and Carolyn Burke on No Regrets for New York Public Radio". WNYC New York "Soundcheck". New York Public Radio.
- Gilbert, Harriet (April 18, 2011). "The Strand: Harriet Gilbert and Carolyn Burke talk about Piaf's resistance work during World War II". BBC World Service's "The Strand" with Harriet Gilbert. British Broadcasting Corporation.
- Fidler, Richard (May 19, 2011). "Carolyn Burke: Biographer Carolyn Burke has unravelled the myths, rumors, and half truths surrounding Edith Piaf". Conversations with Richard Fidler. Australian Broadcasting Corporation.
- Eaton, Oline (March 1, 2012). "Carolyn Burke : No regrets : the life of Edith Piaf". New Books in Biography. Archived from the original on January 21, 2015.
- Villalon, Oscar (March 7, 2019). "Carolyn Burke in conversation with Oscar Villalon about Foursome". ZYZZYVA. City Lights Books, San Francisco.
- Stewart, Alison (May 24, 2019). "Alison Stewart interviews Carolyn Burke about her new book, Foursome: Alfred Stieglitz, Georgia O'Keeffe, Paul Strand, Rebecca Salsbury, which documents the intense relationship among four seminal artists". WNYC's All Of It with Alison Stewart. New York Public Radio.

== Critical studies and reviews ==
- Gavin, James (March 27, 2011). "The Rise of Édith Piaf". Sunday Review Books. The New York Times.
- Nettelbeck, Colin (September 2011). "Sparrow on the Eiffel Tower". Australian Book Review. 334: 42–43.
