= Ion Calvocoressi =

Ion Melville Calvocoressi
- Born: 12 April 1919; Calcutta, India
- Died: 7 July 2007 (aged 88)
- Relatives: Peter Calvocoressi (cousin); Richard Calvocoressi (son)
- Military career
- Allegiance: United Kingdom
- Branch: British Army
- Service years: 1940–1945
- Rank: Honorary Major
- Service number: 132226
- Unit: Scots Guards
- Conflicts: World War II
- Awards: Military Cross; Member of the Order of the British Empire
- Other work: Stockbroker

Major Ion Melville Calvocoressi MBE MC (12 April 1919 – 7 July 2007) was an officer in the British Army during the Second World War and later a stockbroker in the City of London. He was High Sheriff of Kent in 1978–79.

Calvocoressi was born in Calcutta, the only child of Matthew John Calvocoressi (1873–1939). His father was descended from a Greek family from Chios; two uncles married into the Ralli family. He was a director of the Indian branch of Greek merchant business, Ralli Brothers. His mother, Agnes Hermione Melville, was of Anglo-Scottish ancestry and was the granddaughter of Michael Linning Melville. His parents moved to London in 1922. He was educated at Eton College and read Modern Languages at Magdalen College, Oxford.

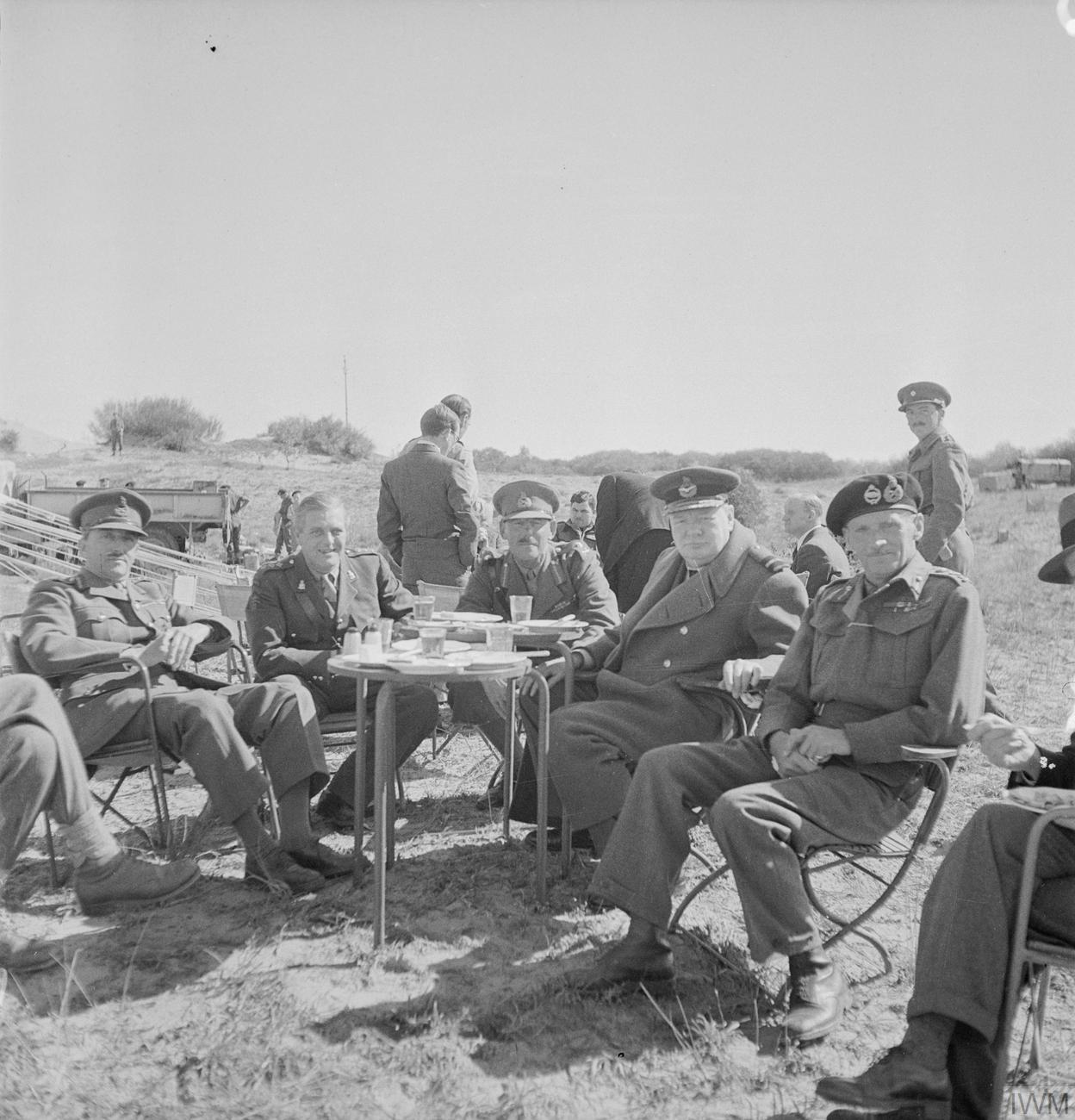
From left to right, General Sir Alan Brooke, Major Randolph Churchill, Lieutenant-General Sir Oliver Leese, Prime Minister Winston Churchill and General Sir Bernard Montgomery, having an alfresco lunch during Prime Minister Churchill's visit to Tripoli, February 1943. Standing behind Montgomery is Leese's aide-de-camp, Ian Calvocoressi.

After the outbreak of the Second World War, he was commissioned into the Scots Guards in 1940, and was posted to Egypt with the 2nd Battalion in 1941. He won an immediate Military Cross in 1942, while serving as a lieutenant in command of a platoon of six-pounder anti-tank guns. The battalion was defending a ridge at Bir el Rigel in Libya. After days of intense fighting, the battalion was attacked by two armoured columns from the 21st Panzer Division on 13 June 1942. His platoon destroyed five German tanks before it was overrun. Calvocoressi was captured, but escaped the following night. He rejoined his unit the next day after walking 17 miles (27 km) across the desert.

He was wounded in July 1942, rescuing members of the battalion's forward observation post, and became aide-de-camp to the commander of XXX Corps, Lieutenant-General Sir Oliver Leese in 1943. He accompanied Leese in North Africa, and, after Leese took command of the Eighth Army, into Italy, and finally to the Far East, where Leese became commander of Allied Land Forces South East Asia. He received the MBE for his service.

He became a stockbroker after the war, concentrating on private client work. He moved to the town of Westerham in Kent in 1950, near the country home of Winston Churchill at Chartwell. He was instrumental in the erection of a statue of Churchill by Oscar Nemon in the town in 1965. He was High Sheriff of Kent in 1978–79.

After he retired, he was chairman of the appeal for the Guards Museum at Wellington Barracks. He was also a life member of the Marylebone Cricket Club, a Fellow of the Ancient Monuments Society, and a financial adviser to the Royal Society of Musicians.

He was survived by his wife, Katherine Kennedy (the sister of Sir Ludovic Kennedy), whom he married on 29 April 1947. They had three sons and a daughter. One son is art historian Richard Calvocoressi.

His cousin, Peter Calvocoressi, worked in RAF Intelligence at Bletchley Park in the Second World War and was an author.
