= Eileen Agar =

Argentine artist, photographer (1899–1991)

- Eileen Agar
- Born: 1 December 1899; Buenos Aires, Argentina
- Died: 7 November 1991 (aged 91); London, England
- Education: Byam Shaw School of Art, Slade School of Fine Art
- Known for: Painting
- Movement: Surrealist
- Spouse: Joseph Bard

Eileen Forrester Agar RA (1 December 1899 – 17 November 1991) was an Argentine-British painter and photographer associated with the Surrealist movement.

== Biography ==
Agar was born in Buenos Aires, to a Scottish father and American mother. Her father was the head of a family business selling windmills and agricultural machinery to Argentina. At a young age, Agar became fascinated by pictures by Edmund Dulac and Arthur Rackham. Before attending school, she grew up in her family villa, Quinta la Lila, learning from her nanny and a French governess. Agar describes her childhood as being "full of balloons, hoops and St Bernard dogs". The family travelled to Britain approximately every two years during her childhood.

Aged six, Agar was sent to England to a private school in Canford Cliffs. At her second school, Heathfield School, Ascot, Agar's teacher, Lucy Kemp-Welch, encouraged her to continue to develop her art. In 1914, at the onset of World War I, Agar was sent away to Tudor Hall, then in Kent, to avoid the hardships of war. The music master, Horace Kesteven, introduced Agar to various artists, in particular, Charles Sims, who exposed her to some of Paul Nash's early works. Of her time with Sims, Agar said: "I found myself in a milieu of art where art was a valued part of daily life".

Before the war ended, Agar attended the Demoiselles Ozanne finishing school to improve her French, and took weekly oil painting lessons at the Byam Shaw School of Art in Kensington. Agar found the Byam Shaw too academic and pleaded with her family to allow her to look elsewhere to continue her schooling. That infuriated her mother and, after an argument with her parents, Agar noted in her diary that she got up early, ate lunch with her sisters, packed her bags, and departed from Paddington station. She left a note for her parents stating that she was on her way to Truro and St Mawes, where she would stay with family friends, the De Kays.

From 1920 to 1921, Agar studied under Leon Underwood at his school at Brook Green. There, she made friends with Blair Hughes-Stanton and Gertrude Hermes, amongst others. From 1921 to 1924, she studied part-time under Henry Tonks at the Slade School of Fine Art in London, alongside Rex Whistler, Cecil Beaton, and her first husband, Robin Bartlett. Agar resisted the wealthy lifestyle she was privy to and pointedly refused to make use of the Rolls-Royce her parents sent to pick her up from the Slade each day. With Bartlett and others, Agar travelled around France and Spain. In 1925, she married Bartlett and, in the same year, she destroyed the majority of her early work. The pair lived together in a house in Dieppe. Agar described Bartlett as "the escape-hatch which freed me from the clutches of my family".

In 1926, Agar met a Hungarian, Joseph Bard, with whom she would spend the next 50 years, and whose passion for jewels she would integrate into her artistic practice. Between 1927 and 1928, Agar and Bard lived in London, but went to Portofino in the winter, where Agar met Ezra Pound, who was to become a friend. In 1928, Agar and Bard moved to Paris, where she met the Surrealists André Breton and Paul Éluard, with whom she had a friendly relationship. In the period 1928 to 1930, Agar studied with the Czech cubist, František Foltýn. With Pound, Agar visited Constantin Brâncuși's studio.

In 1930, Agar returned to England, and painted her first surrealist piece, The Flying Pillar, based on André Breton's Surrealist Manifesto. Agar describes her piece in her memoir as her "first attempt at an imaginative approach to painting and although the result was surreal, it was not done with that intention". Agar said that "Surrealism was in the air in France and poets in France, later in England, were kissing that sleeping beauty troubled by nightmares, and it was the kiss of life that they gave". The Flying Pillar was later renamed the Three Symbols, and was described by Agar as a reference both to Greek art and to Gustave Eiffel and his famous tower, the symbol of modernity. The painting represented the classical world merging with the modern at a crossroads in time. In her 1928 diary entry, she described the various images in her painting as showing Greece as the meeting place of Judaeo-Egyptian and Greco-Christian culture, followed by the words "the Judaeo-Greco pillar", as if it were a note to bear in mind and to later be developed.

In 1931, the first of four issues of The Island was published, edited by Leon Underwood and Joseph Bard. Agar contributed to all four issues. Two years later, she had her first solo show at the Bloomsbury Gallery. She was a member of the London Group from 1934 onwards, and made her first collage in the same year.

In 1934, Agar and Bard took a house for the summer at Swanage, Dorset. There she met Paul Nash and the two began an intense artistic and sexual relationship. In 1935, Nash introduced Agar to the concept of the "found object". Together, they collaborated on a number of works, such as Seashore Monster at Swanage. Nash recommended her work to Roland Penrose and Herbert Read, the organisers of the 1936 London International Surrealist Exhibition at the New Burlington Galleries, despite Agar's denial of the label of surrealist throughout her life. She was one of few women included in the exhibition. Agar exhibited with the Surrealists in England and abroad.

During the 1930s, Agar's work focused on natural objects, often in a light-hearted manner, such as Bum-Thumb Rock, a set of photographs of an unusual rock formation she noticed in Brittany. She started to experiment with automatic techniques and new materials, taking photographs and making collages and objects. The Angel of Anarchy, a plaster head covered in fabric and other media, is an example from 1936 to 1940, and is now in the Tate collection. She created two versions of The Angel of Anarchy after the first version was lost on its way back from a show in Amsterdam. She made her second version in 1940, using the same cast of Joseph Bard's head, and kept the original title. The bust was divided into two parts, one with white fur and one with black fur, with most of the head covered in green osprey and ostrich feathers, and doilies that she received from her mother, who used to wear them as a head dress.

In 1937, Paul Éluard and his wife Nusch Éluard, visited Agar and Bard in London, and they travelled to Cornwall with Roland Penrose and Lee Miller. During that time, Éluard and Agar had an affair. She visited Picasso and Dora Maar's home in Mougins, Alpes-Maritimes, along with Lee Miller, who photographed her. By 1940, works by Agar had appeared in surrealist exhibitions in Amsterdam, New York, Paris and Tokyo. However, the war interrupted her artistic activity.

After World War II, Agar started a new productive phase of her life, holding almost 16 solo exhibitions between 1946 and 1985. By the 1960s, she was producing Tachist paintings with surrealist elements. In 1988, she published her autobiography A Look At My Life. Reviewing it in The Burlington Magazine, Frances Spalding said the book "with its first-hand experience and vivid vignettes of Picasso, Eluard, Henry Moore and many others, makes an important contribution to surrealist literature" Agar was one of the five artists featured in the television series Five Women Painters made in 1989 by the Arts Council and Channel 4, with an accompanying book published by Lennard. In 1990, Agar was elected as a Royal Academy Associate. She died in London. The collections of several British institutions including Tate, Derby Museum and Art Gallery, Bradford, and the UK Government collection, include paintings by Agar.

Agar is buried in the Père Lachaise Cemetery, Paris, in grave No. 17606. Goshka Macuga's 2007 exhibition, part of the "Art Now" series at Tate Britain, used material drawn from Eileen Agar's archive.

== Notable works ==
- The Angel of Mercy, sculpture, 1934
- Quadriga, painting, 1935
- The Angel of Anarchy, object, 1940
- L'horloge d'une femme painting, 1989
- Untitled Self-Portrait, painting, 1949

== See also ==
- Women Surrealists
- Leonora Carrington
