= J. Doyle Penrose =

Irish painter (1862–1932)

James Doyle Penrose RHA JP (9 May 1862 – 2 January 1932) was an Irish painter known for his religious and mythological paintings. He was the father of psychiatrist and mathematician Lionel Penrose and of artist Roland Penrose and the grandfather of mathematical physicist Roger Penrose.

== Biography ==
James Doyle Penrose was a well known portrait artist, sculptor and painter of religious subjects born in County Wicklow, Ireland. He was a member of the Royal Hibernian Academy. He came from a family of prosperous Quakers and was formally trained in London at two Royal Academy of Arts schools: St John's Wood Art School and the Royal College of Art in South Kensington.

Penrose left Ireland with his father and family about 1890 to settle in Hertfordshire near London. He exhibited his work regularly at the Royal Academy of Arts in London from the 1890s until 1927. He travelled extensively in Canada.

He married Elizabeth Josephine Peckover, a daughter of Alexander Peckover, 1st Baron Peckover, a wealthy Quaker banker. They had four sons, including Lionel Sharples Penrose and Roland Penrose.

They had a strict upbringing at Oxhey Grange, Watford. James Doyle Penrose owned the wider Oxhey Grange Estate. In its development of Watford Heath, he included the Rose Tea Cottage and Gardens, in an attempt to attract the local workforce away from the nearby public houses. Penrose was appointed a deputy lieutenant of Cambridgeshire on 15 October 1903.

His wife Elizabeth aged 72 died in July 1930 at Watford. He died in Bognor Regis on Saturday 2 January 1932.

== Legacy ==
Penrose is known primarily for his religious and mythological paintings. Other works include paintings of the Woad industry based near the Wisbech, Isle of Ely home of his inlaws, and a sculpture of his father in law. A black and white photograph of James and his wife is in the online collection of the National Trust.

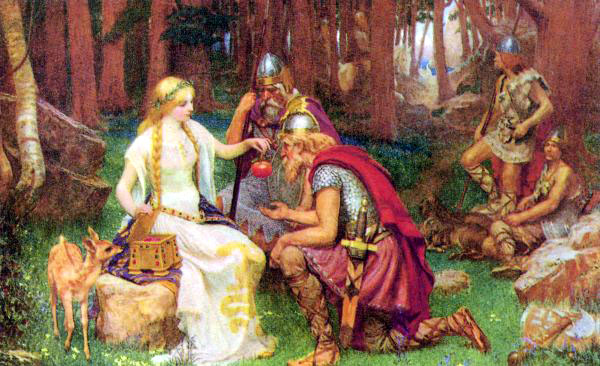
Idun and the Apples, 1890

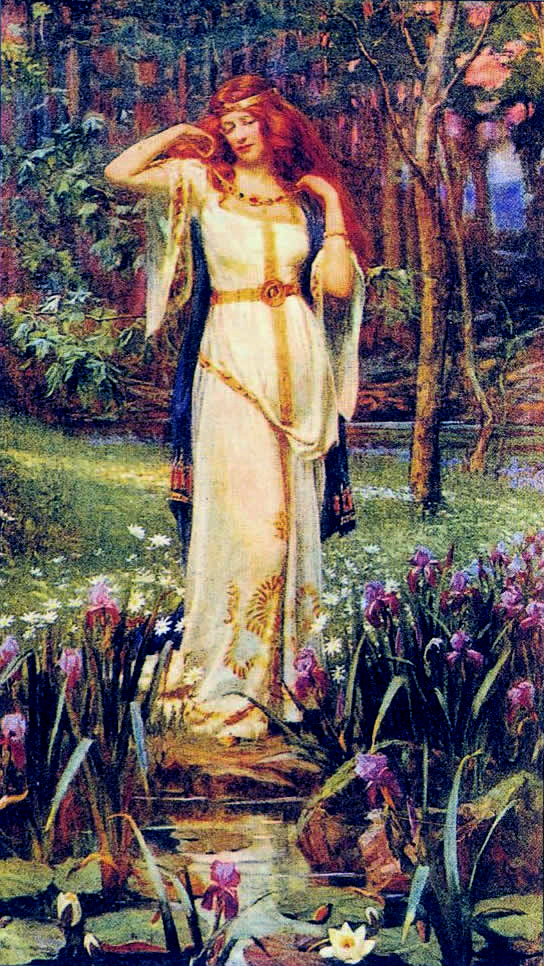
Freya, 1890

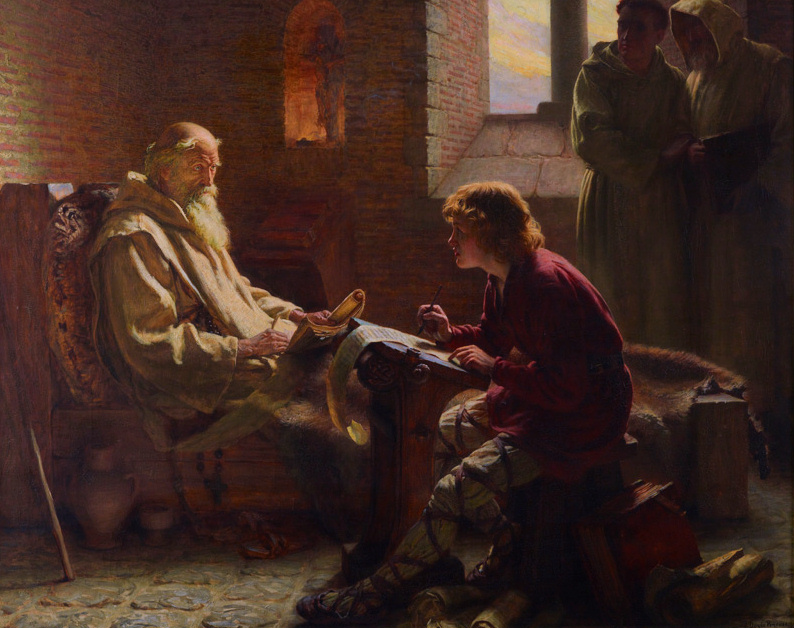
The Last Chapter, 1902

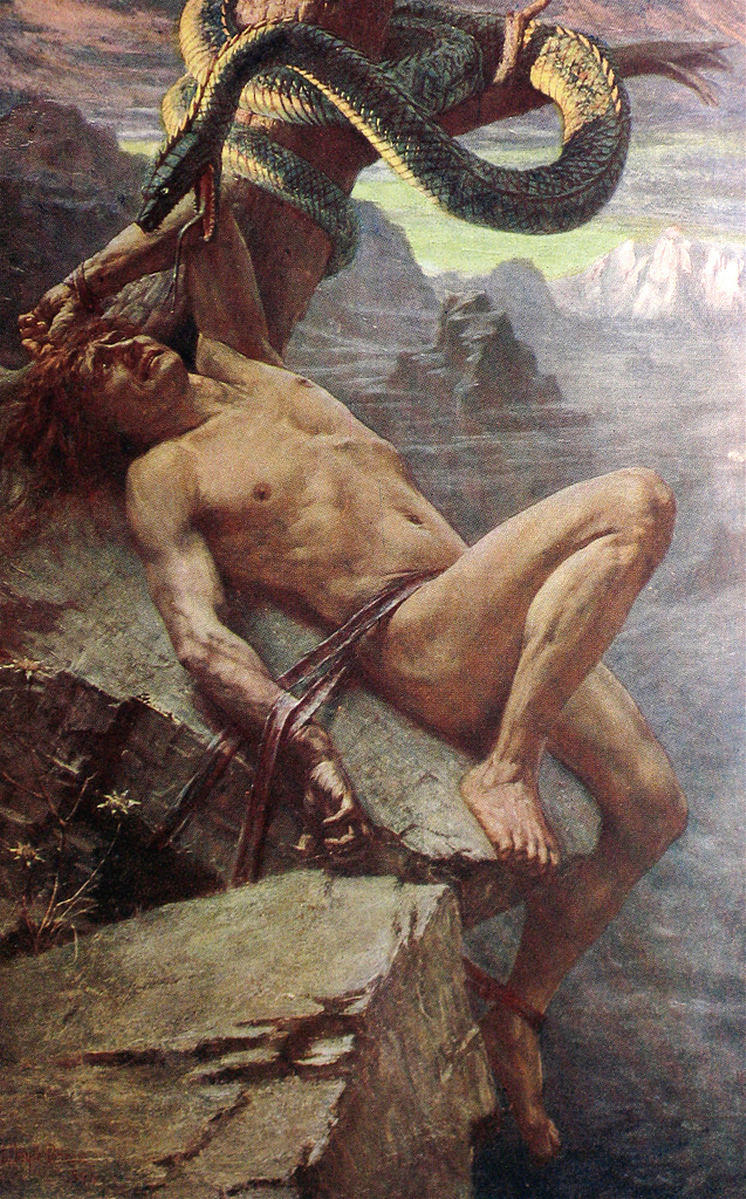
The Punishment Of Loki, 1912
