= Richard Calvocoressi =

British museum curator and art historian

Richard Calvocoressi CBE
- Born: Richard Edward Ion Calvocoressi; 5 May 1951 (age 75); Westerham, Kent, England
- Education: Eton College; Magdalen College, Oxford; Courtauld Institute of Art
- Occupation: Museum curator
- Years active: 1979–present
- Parents: Ion Calvocoressi (father); Katherine Kennedy (mother)

Richard Edward Ion Calvocoressi CBE (b. 5 May 1951) is a British museum and gallery curator and art historian.

== Career ==
Calvocoressi was born in Westerham, Kent, one of three sons of Major Ion Calvocoressi, MBE, MC (1919-2007) and Katherine, née Kennedy (b. 1927). He was educated at Eton College, Brooke House, Market Harborough, and graduated from Magdalen College, Oxford and the Courtauld Institute of Art. He served as an assistant keeper of modern art at the Tate Gallery from 1979 until 1987, and was director of the Scottish National Gallery of Modern Art in Edinburgh from 1987 until 2007. He then served as director of the Henry Moore Foundation, and in 2015 became a senior curator at the Gagosian Gallery.

Calvocoressi was appointed to the Reviewing Committee on the Export of Works of Art on 13 November 2012, serving until 12 November 2016. He was subsequently reappointed for another four-year term.

== Personal life ==
He married Francesca Temple Roberts in 1976. They have three children.

He was appointed a Commander of the Order of the British Empire in the 2008 Birthday Honours for "services to the Arts, particularly in Scotland".

== Selected publications ==
- Marine Painting. Oxford: Phaidon. 1978. ISBN 978-0-71481-774-3.
- Magritte. Oxford: Phaidon. 1979. ISBN 978-0-71481-965-5.
- A. R. Penck: Brown's Hotel and other works. London: Tate Gallery. 1984.
- Lucian Freud: Early Works. Edinburgh: Scottish National Gallery of Modern Art. 1997. ISBN 978-0-90359-866-8.
- Lee Miller: Portraits from a Life. London: Thames & Hudson. 2002. ISBN 978-0-50028-522-0.
- Lucian Freud on Paper. London: Jonathan Cape 2008.
- Francis Bacon: Late Paintings. New York: Rizzoli International. 2016. ISBN 978-0-84784-775-4.
- Georg Baselitz. London: Thames & Hudson. 2021
