= Adolf Hitler's Munich apartment =

Apartment owned by Adolf Hitler

Coordinates: 48.13876°N 11.60737°E

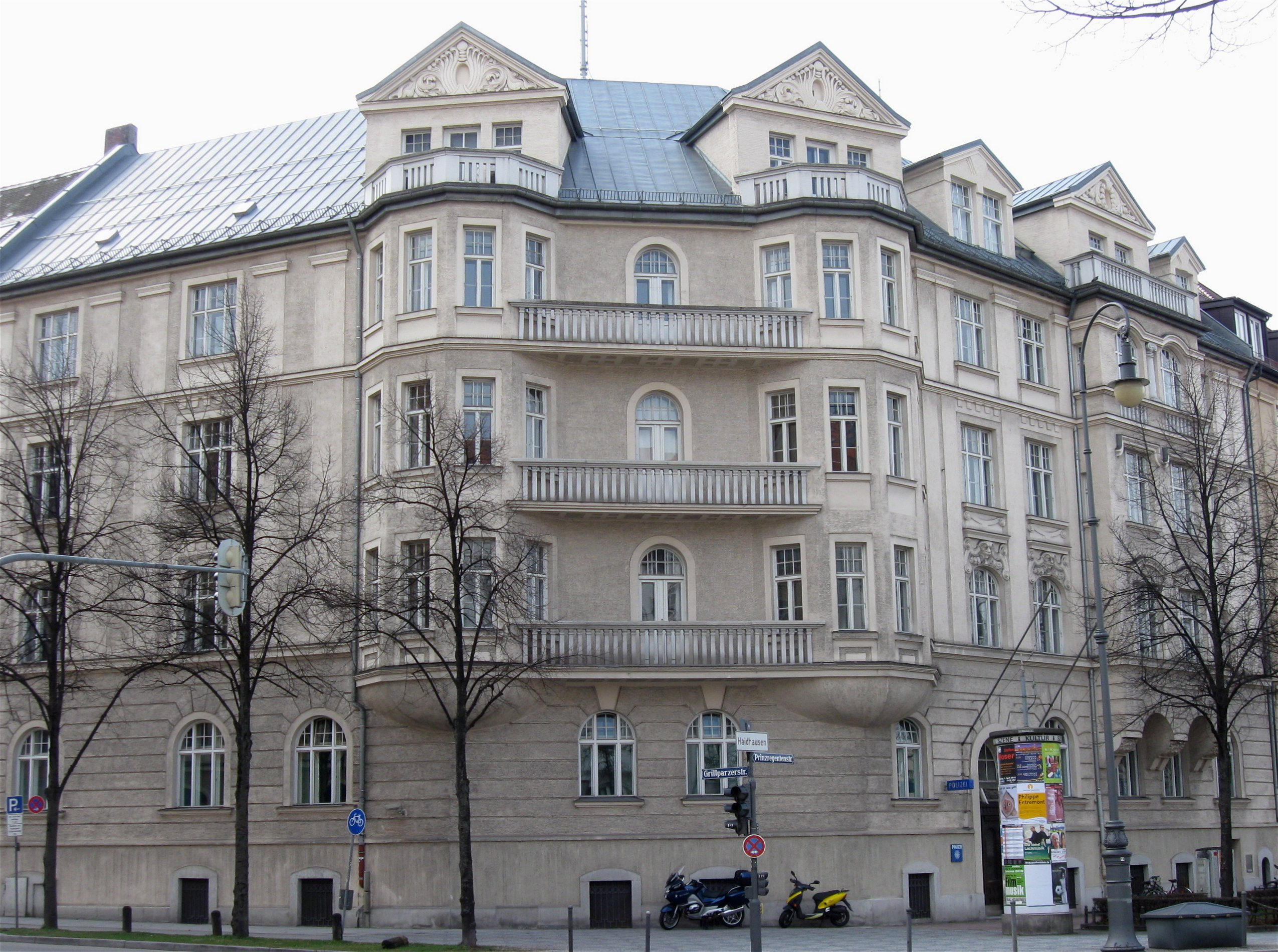
Prinzregentenplatz 16 (2010)

Adolf Hitler's Munich apartment was an apartment owned by Adolf Hitler, located at Prinzregentenplatz 16 in the German city of Munich, the birthplace and capital of the Nazi Party which was formed in Munich in 1920.

== Earlier residence ==
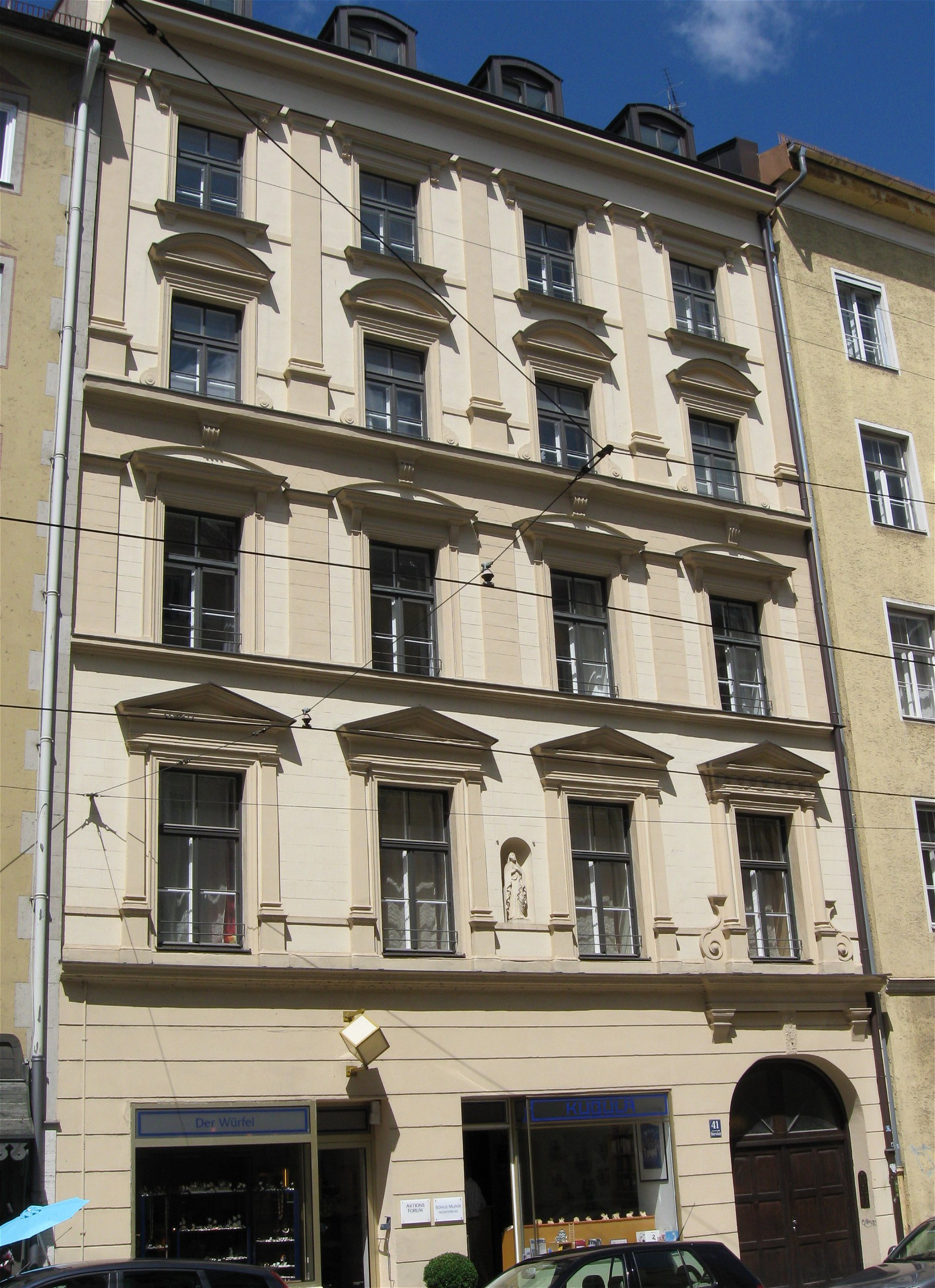
Thierschstrasse 41 (2011)

After Hitler was discharged from the Bavarian Army in March 1920, he returned to Munich and went to work full-time for the National Socialist German Workers Party (Nazi Party), which was headquartered in that city. He rented a small bedroom at Thierschstraße 41 from 1920 to 1929. Later, he rented a second room to use as an office. In 1936, the Munich city council placed a plaque on the building which read, "Adolf Hitler lived in this house from 1 May 1920 to 5 October 1929". The building still stands; Hitler's former room is used for storage.

== Prinzregentenplatz 16 ==
In 1929, Hitler moved into a luxury eight-room apartment at Prinzregentenplatz 16. The apartment was on the second floor (according to European convention; third floor by American convention) and included two kitchens and two bathrooms. His publisher initially paid for it; a decade later Hitler paid for it outright. Eventually, the whole building became property of the Nazi Party.

In 1935 the apartment was renovated by designer Gerdy Troost, widow of architect Paul Ludwig Troost, a member of the Nazi Party and architectural advisor of Hitler. Hitler filled the apartment with works of art he had collected, particularly nineteenth-century German paintings as well as German Old Masters.

In 1925, Hitler brought his widowed half-sister Angela Raubal from Austria to serve as housekeeper for both his Munich apartment and his rented villa The Berghof. She brought along her two daughters, Geli and Friedl. Hitler became very close to his niece Geli Raubal, and she moved into his apartment in 1929, when she was 20. Their relationship is shrouded in mystery but was widely rumored to be romantic. On 18 September 1931, she died of a gunshot wound in the apartment; the coroner proclaimed her death a suicide. Hitler was on his way to Erlangen to give a speech, but he returned immediately to Munich on hearing the news. He took her death very hard and went into a depression. He mourned her for years, maintaining her rooms exactly as they had been.

Hitler continued to live in the apartment until 1934, when he became Führer und Reichskanzler of Germany. After that, Hitler kept the apartment, but spent most of his time either in Berlin or in his Berghof residence.

Hitler sometimes used the Munich apartment for high-level diplomatic meetings. On 25 September 1937, he met there with Benito Mussolini when he was trying to get Mussolini to agree to his plan to annex Austria to Germany; the leaders agreed to a strengthening of their Axis pact. He also met with British prime minister Neville Chamberlain in the apartment on 30 September 1938, following the signing of the four-power Munich Accords.

=== Postwar period ===
When the Allies occupied Munich in 1945, they found the apartment exactly as Hitler had left it. Vogue photographer Lee Miller caught the public imagination by being photographed taking a bath in Hitler's tub on 30 April 1945, coincidentally the same day that Hitler committed suicide. The building served as the headquarters of the American Section during the immediate postwar period.

=== Today ===
The building still stands and is occupied by the Munich Financing Office for the state of Bavaria. The second floor, Hitler's former apartment, houses the headquarters of the regional police of Munich and is not open to the public.

== See also ==
- Führer Headquarters – Administrative centers used by Nazi leaders throughout World War II
