= Joseph Bard =

Hungarian writer

Joseph Bard (18 May 1892 – 1975), born József Diamant, was an expatriate Hungarian writer, known for a novel Shipwreck in Europe (1928) and short stories written in English, and as a literary editor. He settled in the United Kingdom, where he was later known as Joseph Bard. His background was Jewish and Hungarian.

== Life ==
Bard was born in Budapest on 18 May 1892, and left Hungary in 1922. He had two children by Jolan Weinberger: George (b. 1911) and Valentine (b. 1913). George was murdered in the Holocaust in Hungary. Valentine and her family emigrated to the U.S. after the 1956 Hungarian Revolution.

Bard was married to Dorothy Thompson from 1922 to 1927, and married the artist Eileen Agar in 1940. He was a friend and supporter of Ezra Pound, with whom he corresponded when Pound was confined to hospital.

== Bibliography ==
- Shipwreck in Europe (1928)
- The Island - Volume 1, number 1 - as editor
- The Island - Volume 1, number 2 - as editor
- The Island - Volume 1, number 3 - as editor
- The Island - Volume 1, number 4 - as editor (December 1931)
- The Tale of a Child (Hungary 1900) (Bonner, 1932)
