= Roland Penrose =

British artist and art historian (1900–1984)

Sir Roland Penrose CBE
- Penrose, circa 1940
- Born: Roland Algernon Penrose; 14 October 1900; London, England
- Died: 23 April 1984 (aged 83); Chiddingly, East Sussex, England
- Education: Architecture
- Movement: Surrealism
- Spouses: Valentine Boué (m. 1925; div. 1937) Lee Miller (m. 1947; died 1977)
- Children: Antony Penrose
- Father: James Doyle Penrose
- Relatives: Roger Penrose (nephew); Jonathan Penrose (nephew)
- Military career
- Allegiance: United Kingdom
- Branch: British Army
- Service years: 1943–1945
- Rank: Captain
- Unit: Royal Engineers

Sir Roland Algernon Penrose CBE (14 October 1900 – 23 April 1984) was an English artist, historian and poet. He was a major promoter and collector of modern art and an associate of the surrealists in the United Kingdom. During the Second World War he put his artistic skills to practical use as a teacher of camouflage.

Penrose married the poet Valentine Boué and then the photographer Lee Miller.

== Biography ==
=== Early life ===
Penrose was the son of James Doyle Penrose (1862–1932), a successful portrait painter, and Elizabeth Josephine Peckover, the daughter of Lord Peckover, a wealthy Quaker banker. He was the third of four brothers; his older brother was the medical geneticist Lionel Penrose.

Roland grew up in a strict Quaker family in Watford and attended The Downs School, Colwall, Herefordshire, and then Leighton Park School, Reading, Berkshire. In August 1918, as a conscientious objector, he joined the Friends' Ambulance Unit, serving from September 1918 with the British Red Cross in Italy. After studying architecture at Queens' College, Cambridge, Penrose switched to painting and moved to France, where he lived from 1922 and where in 1925 he married his first wife the poet Valentine Boué.

During this period he became friends with the artists Pablo Picasso, Wolfgang Paalen and Max Ernst, who would have the strongest influence on his work and most of the leading Surrealists.

=== Surrealism ===
Surrealist work Le Grand Jour, 1938, described by Penrose as a collage painting, made using nothing but paint, depicting among other things an alembic

Penrose returned to London in 1936 and was one of the organisers of the London International Surrealist Exhibition, which led to the establishment of the English surrealist movement. Penrose settled in Hampstead, north London, where he was the centre of the community of avant-garde British artists and emigres who had settled there. With the Belgian surrealist E. L. T. Mesens, he opened the London Gallery on Cork Street, where he promoted the Surrealists as well as the sculptor Henry Moore, to whom he was first introduced by his close friend Wolfgang Paalen, as well as the painter Ben Nicholson, and the sculptors Barbara Hepworth and Naum Gabo.

Busy with other duties, he made a small number of paintings such as the 1938 Le Grand Jour, which he described as "a collage painting although nothing but paint has been applied to the canvas. The images are unrelated to each other but by coming together like images in dreams they produce new associations which can be interpreted in whatever way the spectator may feel inclined." The image, he wrote "seemed to indicate an atmosphere of excitement and exhilaration centred round the distillation of a dance hall and a sunset in an alembic".

=== London, Cornwall, and Paris ===
Penrose commissioned a sculpture from Moore for his Hampstead house; the work became the focus of a press campaign against abstract art. Penrose and Boué's marriage had broken down in 1934, and they divorced in 1937. Penrose came to Cornwall in June 1937, staying in his brother's home at Lambe Creek on the Truro River. He was accompanied by a group of surrealist artists; his new lover Leonora Carrington, Max Ernst, Eileen Agar, Lee Miller, Man Ray, Edouard Mesens, Paul Eluard, and Joseph Bard. Photographs of their stay can be seen at Falmouth Art Gallery.

In 1938, Penrose organised a tour of Picasso's Guernica that raised funds for the Republican Government in Spain. In the same year he had an affair with Peggy Guggenheim, when she met him at her gallery Guggenheim Jeune to try and sell him a painting by French Surrealist artist Yves Tanguy. Penrose told Guggenheim he loved an American woman in Egypt, and in her autobiography Guggenheim reports that she told him to "go to Egypt to get his ladylove".

By 1939, Penrose had begun a relationship with the model and photographer Lee Miller. He also had an affair with the art conservator and botanist Gigi Crompton between 1945 and 1947. Penrose married Miller in 1947. They lived at 21 Downshire Hill, Hampstead, London, which now bears a blue plaque.

=== World War II camouflage work ===
Penrose used this photograph of his partner Lee Miller to startle his audiences when lecturing on camouflage.

As a Quaker, Penrose had been a pacifist, but after the outbreak of the Second World War he volunteered as an air raid warden and then taught military camouflage at the Home Guard training centre at Osterley Park. This led to Penrose's commission as a captain in the Royal Engineers.

He worked as senior lecturer at the Eastern Command Camouflage School in Norwich, and at the Camouflage Development and Training Centre at Farnham Castle, Surrey. During his lectures, he used to startle his audiences by inserting a colour photograph of his partner Lee Miller, lying on a lawn naked but for a camouflage net; when challenged, he argued that "if camouflage can hide Lee's charms, it can hide anything". Forbes suggests this was a surrealist technique being put into service. His lectures were respected by both trainees and colleagues. In 1941 Penrose wrote the Home Guard Manual of Camouflage, which provided accurate guidance on the use of texture, not only colour, especially for protection from aerial photography, which was monochrome at that time.

Penrose applied for a job at the Foreign Office, but was turned down because of a perceived security risk, possibly relating to the investigation of Lee Miller by MI5.

=== The ICA ===
After the war, Penrose co-founded the Institute of Contemporary Arts (ICA) in London in 1947. He organised the first two ICA exhibitions: 40 Years of Modern Art, which included many key works of Cubism, and 40,000 Years of Modern Art, which reflected his interest in African sculpture. Penrose was a presence at the ICA for 30 years; he produced books on the works of his friends Pablo Picasso, Max Ernst, Joan Miró, Man Ray and Antoni Tàpies. He was also a trustee of the Tate Gallery; he organised a survey of Picasso's work there in 1960 and used his contacts to negotiate purchases of works by Picasso and the Surrealists at discounted prices.

=== Farley Farm ===
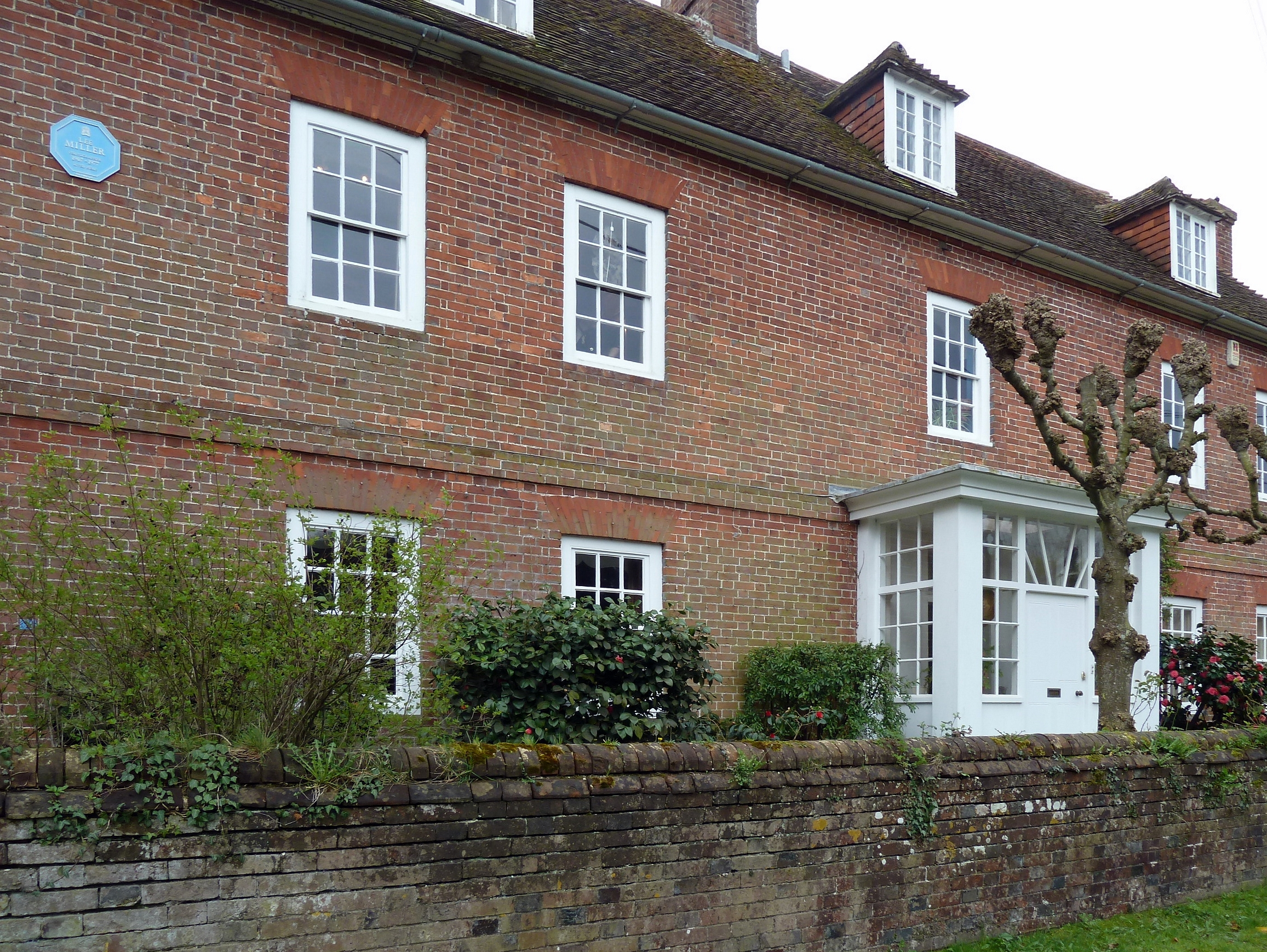
Farleys House, now a museum and archive, with blue plaque

Penrose and Miller bought Farley Farm House near Chiddingly, East Sussex, in 1949, where he displayed his valuable collection of modern art, and in particular the Surrealists and works by Picasso. Penrose designed the landscaping around the house as a setting for works of modern sculpture. Farleys House is now a museum and archive open to the public for guided tours on pre-determined days.

Penrose remained close to his first wife, Valentine; they met again in London during the Second World War, and she came to live with Roland and Lee Miller for eighteen months. Valentine died at Farley Farm in 1978. Penrose died on 23 April 1984, his late wife Lee Miller's birthday.

== Awards and distinctions ==
His bold and enigmatic paintings, drawings and objects are some of the most enduring images of the surrealist movement. Examples of his postcard collages are found in major national collections across Britain. His personal library is housed within the Gabrielle Kieller Library at the Scottish National Gallery of Modern Art. He was awarded the CBE in 1960, and he was knighted for his services to the visual arts in 1966. The University of Sussex awarded him an honorary Doctorate of Letters in 1980.

== Family ==
Penrose is the uncle of the physicist and polymath Roger Penrose, and the chess Grandmaster Jonathan Penrose. He and Lee Miller had a son, Antony Penrose, who continues to run Farleys House as a museum and archive.

== Recordings ==
An interview with Roland Penrose (and Lee Miller) recorded in 1946 can be heard on the audio CD Surrealism Reviewed.

A filmed interview between Penrose and Antoni Tàpies was directed by James Scott in Spain in 1974. The film, not previously completed, was in pre-production in 2018. The footage is available for viewing through the Fundació Antoni Tàpies.

Extracts from an interview between Penrose and Max Ernst can be seen in episode 5, "The Threshold of Liberty", of Robert Hughes's art-historical series The Shock of the New (1980).

== See also ==
- Stanley William Hayter
- Julian Trevelyan
