= Lee Miller =

American photographer and photojournalist (1907–1977)

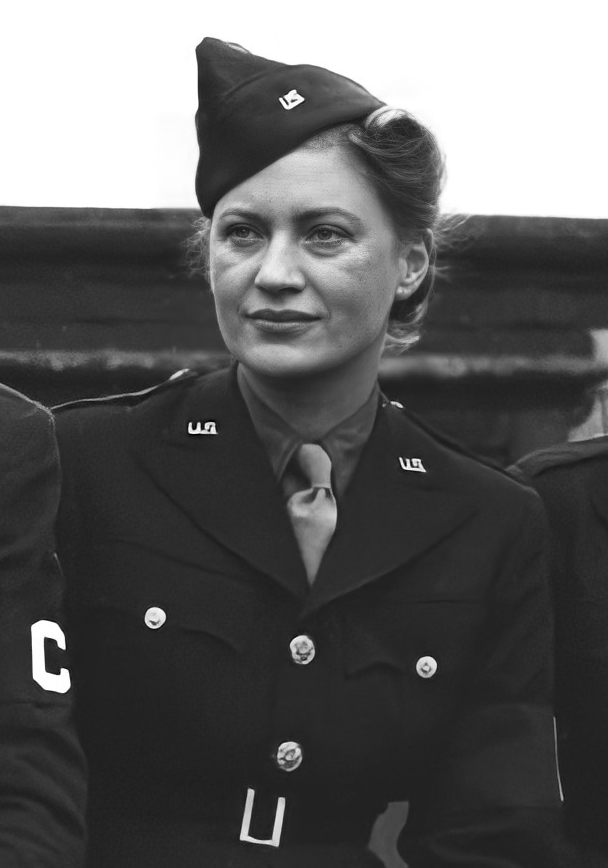
- Miller in 1943
- Born: Elizabeth Miller; April 23, 1907; Poughkeepsie, New York, U.S.
- Died: July 21, 1977 (aged 70); Chiddingly, East Sussex, UK
- Known for: Photojournalism
- Movement: Surrealism
- Spouses: Aziz Eloui Bey (m. 1934; div. 1947); Roland Penrose (m. 1947)
- Children: Antony Penrose
- Website: leemiller.co.uk

Elizabeth "Lee" Miller, Lady Penrose (April 23, 1907 – July 21, 1977) was an American photographer and photojournalist. Miller was a fashion model in New York City in the 1920s before going to Paris, becoming a fashion and fine-art photographer there.

During World War II, she was a war photographer and correspondent for Vogue magazine, covering events such as the London Blitz, the liberation of Paris and the concentration camps at Buchenwald and Dachau. She was known primarily as the muse and lover of the Surrealist artist Man Ray until her son's discovery and promotion of her work established her reputation as an art and war photographer.

== Early life and education ==
Miller was born on April 23, 1907, in Poughkeepsie, New York. Her parents were Theodore Miller (1872—1971) and Florence Miller (née MacDonald, 1881—1954). Her father was of German descent, and her mother was of Scottish and Irish descent. She had a younger brother named Erik, and her older brother was the aviator Johnny Miller. Theodore always favored Lee, and often used her as a model for his amateur photography. When she was seven years old, Lee was raped by the son of a family friend in Brooklyn, and was infected with gonorrhea. In her childhood, Miller was expelled from almost every school she attended while living in the Poughkeepsie area.

In 1925, aged 18, Miller moved to Paris in France, where she studied lighting, costume, and design at the Ladislas Medgyes' School of Stagecraft. She returned to New York in 1926 and joined an experimental drama program at Vassar College, taught by Hallie Flanagan, a pioneer of experimental theatre. Soon afterwards, Miller left home at 19 and enrolled in the Art Students League of New York in Manhattan to study life drawing and painting.

== Career ==
=== Modeling ===
Miller's father introduced her and her brothers to photography at an early age. She was his model – he took many photographs, including stereoscopic images, of his teenage daughter, some nude – and showed her technical aspects of the art. At 19, she nearly stepped in front of a car on a Manhattan street but was prevented by Condé Nast, the publisher of Vogue magazine. According to one account, she was so scared that she began speaking French in exasperation. This, combined with her being dressed in fashionable European styles, intrigued Nast, who launched her modeling career. She appeared in a blue hat and pearls in a drawing by George Lepape on the cover of Vogue on March 15, 1927. Miller's look was what Vogue's then editor-in-chief Edna Woolman Chase was looking for to represent the emerging idea of the "modern girl". On the advice of the illustrator Neysa McMein, she adopted the name "Lee".

For the next two years, Miller was one of the most sought-after models in New York, photographed by leading fashion photographers, including Edward Steichen, Arnold Genthe, Nickolas Muray, and George Hoyningen-Huene. Kotex used a photograph of Miller by Steichen to advertise their menstrual pads without her knowledge. She was hired by a fashion designer in 1929 to make drawings of fashion details in Renaissance paintings but, in time, grew tired of this and found photography more efficient.

=== Photography ===
External videos
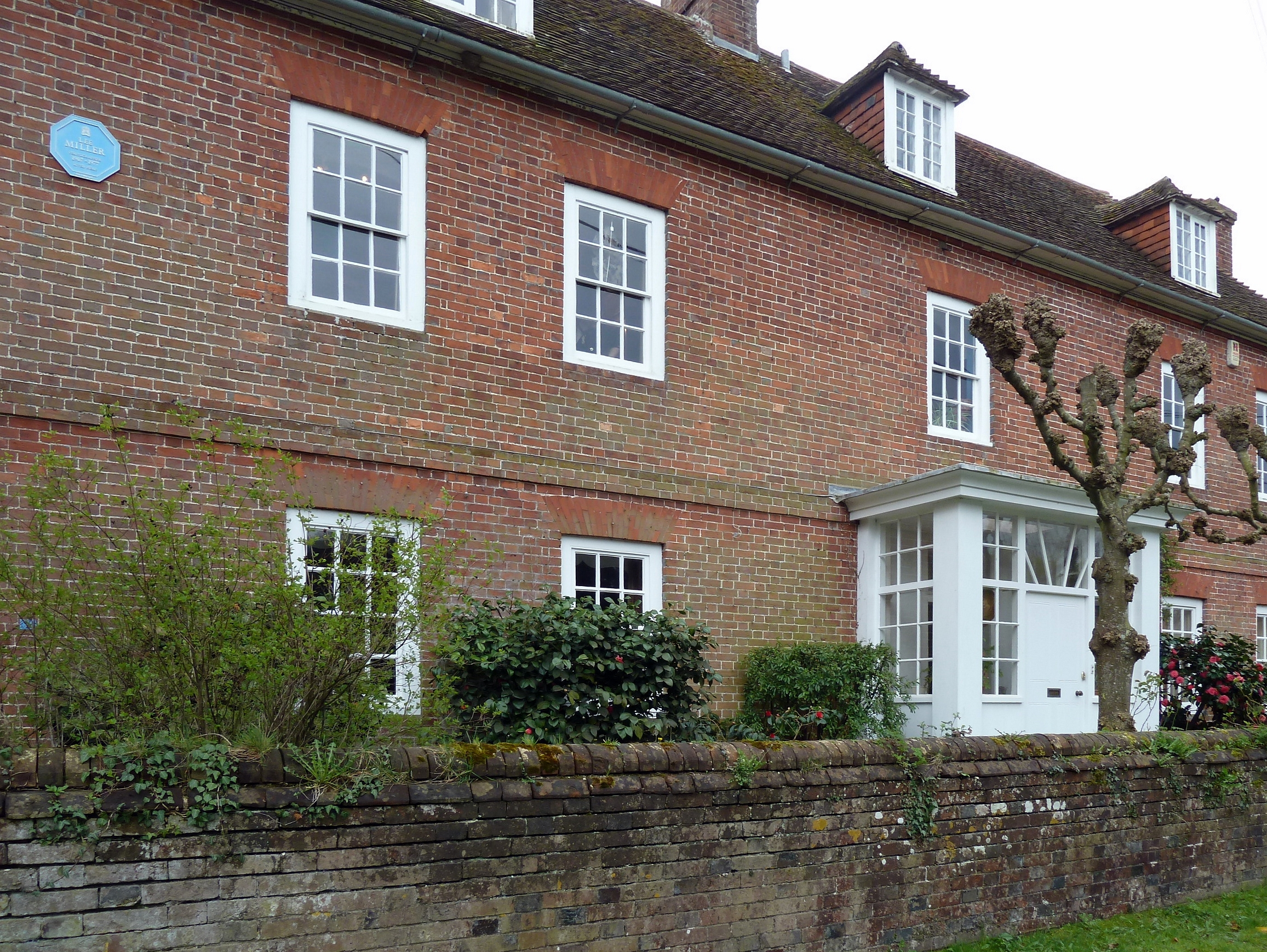
- Farley Farm House
- Man Ray Portraits: Lee Miller's house on YouTube (4:33)

In 1929, Miller traveled to Paris intending to apprentice with the surrealist artist and photographer Man Ray. Although, at first, he insisted that he did not take students, Miller soon became his model and collaborator (announcing to him, "I'm your new student"), as well as his lover and muse. Some photographs taken by Miller are credited to Man Ray.

Along with Man Ray, Miller rediscovered the photographic technique of solarisation through an accident that has been variously described. One of Miller's accounts involved a mouse running over her foot, causing her to switch on the light in the darkroom in mid-development of the photograph. The couple made the technique a distinctive visual signature, examples being Man Ray's solarised portrait of Miller taken in Paris circa 1930, and Miller's portraits of fellow surrealist Méret Oppenheim (1930), Miller's friend Dorothy Hill (1933), and the silent film star Lilian Harvey (1933).

Solarisation fits the surrealist principle of the unconscious accident being integral to art and evokes the style's appeal to the irrational or paradoxical in combining opposites of positive and negative. Mark Haworth-Booth describes solarisation as "a perfect surrealist medium in which positive and negative occur simultaneously, as if in a dream".

Among Miller's friends were Duchess Solange d'Ayen–the fashion editor of French Vogue, Pablo Picasso and fellow surrealists Paul Éluard and Jean Cocteau. Cocteau was so mesmerized by Miller's beauty that he transformed her into a plaster cast of a classical statue for his film, The Blood of a Poet (1930). During a dispute with Man Ray regarding the attribution of their co-produced work, Man Ray is said to have slashed an image of Miller's neck with a razor.

After leaving Man Ray and Paris in 1932, Miller returned to New York City. She established a portrait and commercial photography studio (with $10,000 worth of backing from Christian R. Holmes Jr. and Cliff Smith) with her brother Erik (who had worked for the fashion photographer Toni von Horn) as her darkroom assistant. Miller rented two apartments in a building one block from Radio City Music Hall. One of the apartments became her home, while the other became the Lee Miller Studio. Clients of the Lee Miller Studio included BBDO, Henry Sell, Elizabeth Arden, Helena Rubinstein, Saks Fifth Avenue, I. Magnin and Co., and Jay Thorpe.

During 1932, Miller was included in the Modern European Photography exhibition at the Julien Levy Gallery in New York and the Brooklyn Museum's exhibition International Photographers with László Moholy-Nagy, Cecil Beaton, Margaret Bourke-White, Tina Modotti, Charles Sheeler, Man Ray, and Edward Weston. In response to the exhibition, Katherine Grant Sterne wrote a review in Parnassus in March 1932, noting that Miller "has retained more of her American character in the Paris milieu. The very beautiful Bird Cages at Brooklyn; the study of a pink-nailed hand embedded in curly blond hair which is included in both the Brooklyn and the Julien Levy show; and the brilliant print of a white statue against a black drop, illuminating it rather than distort it."

In 1933, Julien Levy gave Miller the only solo exhibition of her life. Among her portrait clients were the surrealist artist Joseph Cornell, actresses Lilian Harvey and Gertrude Lawrence, and the African-American cast of the Virgil Thomson–Gertrude Stein opera Four Saints in Three Acts (1934).

In 1934, Miller abandoned her studio to marry the Egyptian businessman and engineer Aziz Eloui Bey, who had come to New York City to buy equipment for the Egyptian National Railways. Although she did not work as a professional photographer during this period, the photographs she took while living in Egypt with Eloui, including Portrait of Space, a desert landscape seen through a torn fly screen, are regarded as some of her most striking surrealist images. In Egypt, Miller took a photograph of the desert near Siwa Oasis that Magritte saw and used as inspiration for his 1938 painting Le Baiser. Miller also contributed an object to the Surrealist Objects and Poems exhibition at the London Gallery in 1934.

By 1937, Miller had grown bored with her life in Cairo. She returned to Paris and went to a party the day she arrived, where she reconciled with Man Ray, and met the British surrealist painter and curator Roland Penrose. They quickly became lovers and in July 1938 took a trip together around the Balkans. At the end of their journey, Miller returned to Cairo, and Penrose to London, where he created one of the earliest known surrealist photobooks, titled The Road is Wider Than Long, dedicated to Miller.

Four of her photographs, "Egypt" (1939), "Roumania" (1938), "Libya" (1939), and "Sinai" (1939), were displayed at the Zwemmer Gallery's 1940 exhibition, Surrealism To-Day. The Museum of Modern Art (MoMA) included her work in the exhibition Britain at War in New York City in 1941. No other exhibition would include her photographs until 1955, when she was included in the renowned The Family of Man exhibition curated by Edward Steichen, director of the MoMA Department of Photography.

=== World War II ===
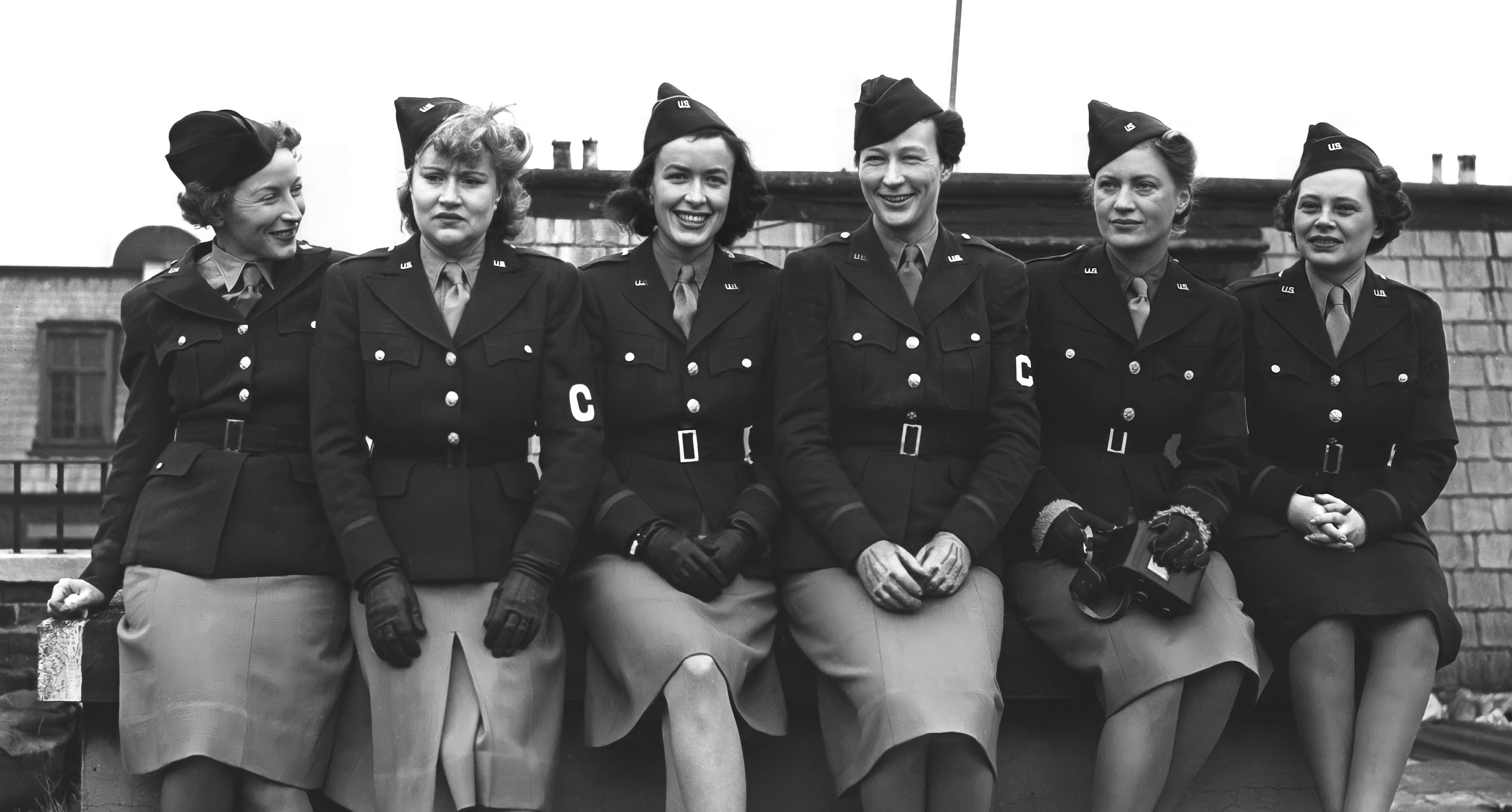
Miller in 1943 with other female war correspondents who covered the U.S. Army in the European Theater during World War II; from left to right: Mary Welsh, Dixie Tighe, Kathleen Harriman, Helen Kirkpatrick, Lee Miller, and Tania Long

At the outbreak of World War II, Miller was living at Downshire Hill in Hampstead, London, with Penrose when Germany's aerial bombardment of the city began. Ignoring pleas from friends and family to return to the U.S., Miller embarked on a new career in photojournalism as the official war photographer for Vogue, documenting what became known as the Blitz. Because the British Army would not let her accompany them, she managed to be accredited with the U.S. Army instead as a war correspondent for Condé Nast Publications from December 1942. Miller's first article for British Vogue was on nurses at an army base in Oxford. She took portraits of nurses across Europe, including those on the front lines and prisoners of war.

Following the D-Day invasion of France in 1944, Miller was tasked with reporting on what she was told was the newly-liberated town of Saint-Malo. She travelled there only to find that the city was still being heavily fought over. Miller's military accreditation as a female war correspondent did not allow her to enter an active combat zone. Still, rather than leave, she decided to stay, and spent five days on the front lines photographing as much of the Battle of Saint-Malo as she could. Her photographs included the first recorded use of napalm. When the military authorities realized where she was, they put Miller under temporary house arrest and placed strict limits on her movements.

While she was working with Vogue during World War II, Miller's goal was to "document war as historical evidence". Her work provided "context for events" and "an eye-witness account" of the casualties of war. Miller's work was very specific and surrealist, like her previous publications and modelling with Vogue. She spent time composing her photographs, famously framing some from inside the cattle trains that had transported thousands of Jews to Nazi death camps. Miller's work with Vogue during wartime was often a combination of journalism and art, sometimes manipulated to evoke strong emotions.

Miller teamed up with American photojournalist David E. Scherman, a Life magazine correspondent, on many assignments, including the liberation of Paris, the Battle of Alsace, and the horrors of the Nazi concentration camps at Buchenwald and Dachau. She sent a telegram “I IMPLORE YOU TO BELIEVE THIS IS TRUE.” back to the British Vogue editor, Audrey Withers, urging her to publish photojournalism from the camps. She did this following a CBS broadcast from Buchenwald by Edward R. Murrow, and Richard Dimbleby's BBC broadcast from inside Bergen-Belsen to overcome people's disbelief at such atrocities. American and British Vogue published her reports headlined "BELIEVE IT" and "GERMANS ARE LIKE THIS."

Scherman's iconic photograph of Miller sitting in the bathtub in Adolf Hitler's private apartment in Munich, with the dried mud of that morning's visit to Dachau on her boots deliberately dirtying Hitler's bathroom, was taken on the evening of April 30, 1945, coincidentally the same day that Hitler committed suicide. After posing for the bathtub photograph, Miller took a bath in the tub, and then slept in Hitler's bed. She was also photographed in Eva Braun's bed.

During this period, Miller photographed dying children in a Vienna hospital, peasant life in post-war Hungary, corpses of Nazi officers and their families, and finally, the execution of former Hungarian Prime Minister László Bárdossy. After the war, she continued working for Vogue for another two years, covering fashion and celebrities.

=== Life in Britain ===
After returning to Britain from central Europe, Miller suffered severe episodes of clinical depression that her son believes was due to post-traumatic stress disorder (PTSD). He also described her alcoholism and recovery from alcohol abuse in his 1985 biography, The Lives of Lee Miller.

In November 1946, Miller was commissioned by British Vogue to illustrate an article titled "When James Joyce Lived in Dublin", by Joyce's old friend and confidant Constantine Curran. Following a list given to her by Curran, Miller photographed numerous places and people in Dublin, many with a connection to Joyce. The article and photographs appeared in American Vogue in May 1947 and British Vogue in 1950. The photos provide a remarkable record of Joyce's hometown and Dublin during that time.

In 1946, Miller travelled with Roland Penrose to the United States, where she visited Man Ray in California. After she discovered she was pregnant by Penrose, she divorced Bey and, on May 3, 1947, married Penrose. Their only son, Antony Penrose, was born on September 9, 1947. In 1949, the couple bought Farley Farm House in Chiddingly, East Sussex. During the 1950s and 1960s, Farley Farm became a sort of artistic Mecca for visiting artists such as Picasso, Man Ray, Henry Moore, Eileen Agar, Jean Dubuffet, Dorothea Tanning and Max Ernst.

While Miller continued to do the occasional photo shoot for Vogue, she soon discarded the darkroom for the kitchen, becoming a gourmet cook. According to her housekeeper Patsy, she specialized in "historical food" such as roast suckling pig, as well as treats such as marshmallows in a cola sauce (especially made to annoy the English critic Cyril Connolly who told her Americans did not know how to cook).

Miller also provided photographs for her husband's biographies of Picasso and Antoni Tàpies. However, images from the war, especially of the concentration camps, continued to haunt her, and she started on what her son later described as a "downward spiral". Her depression may have been accelerated by her husband's long affair with the trapeze artist Diane Deriaz.

Miller was investigated by the British security service MI5 during the 1940s and 1950s, on suspicion of being a Soviet spy.

In October 1969, Miller was asked in an interview with a New York Times reporter what drew her to photography. Her response was that it was "a matter of getting out on a damn limb and sawing it off behind you."

== Death ==
Miller died of pancreatic cancer at Farley Farm House in 1977, aged 70. She was cremated, and her ashes were spread through her herb garden at Farley.

== Legacy ==
Miller's work has served as inspiration for Gucci's Frida Giannini, Ann Demeulemeester, and Alexander McQueen. Playwright David Hare comments: "Today, when the mark of a successful iconographer is to offer craven worship of wealth, or yet more craven worship of power and celebrity, it is impossible to imagine an artist of Lee's subtlety and humanity commanding the resources of a mass-market magazine." Mark Haworth-Booth, curator of The Art of Lee Miller, has said "her photographs shocked people out of their comfort zone" and that "she had a chip of ice in her heart... she got very close to things... Margaret Bourke-White was far away from the fighting, but Lee was close. That's what makes the difference—Lee was prepared to shock."

In 1932, for the Poughkeepsie Evening Star, Miller stated that photography was "perfectly suited to women as a profession... it seems to me that women have a bigger chance at success in photography than men... women are quicker and more adaptable than men. And I think they have an intuition that helps them understand personalities more quickly than men."

Throughout her life, Miller did very little to promote her photographic work. That Miller's work is known today is mainly due to the efforts of her son, Antony Penrose, who has been studying, conserving, and promoting his mother's work since the early 1980s. He discovered sixty thousand or so photographs, negatives, documents, journals, cameras, love letters, and souvenirs in cardboard boxes and trunks in Farley Farm's attic after his mother's death. He owns the house and offers tours of the works of Miller and Penrose. The house is home to the private collections of Miller and Penrose, their work, and some of their favourite art pieces. In the dining room, the fireplace was decorated in vivid colours by Penrose. Her pictures are accessible at the Lee Miller Archives.

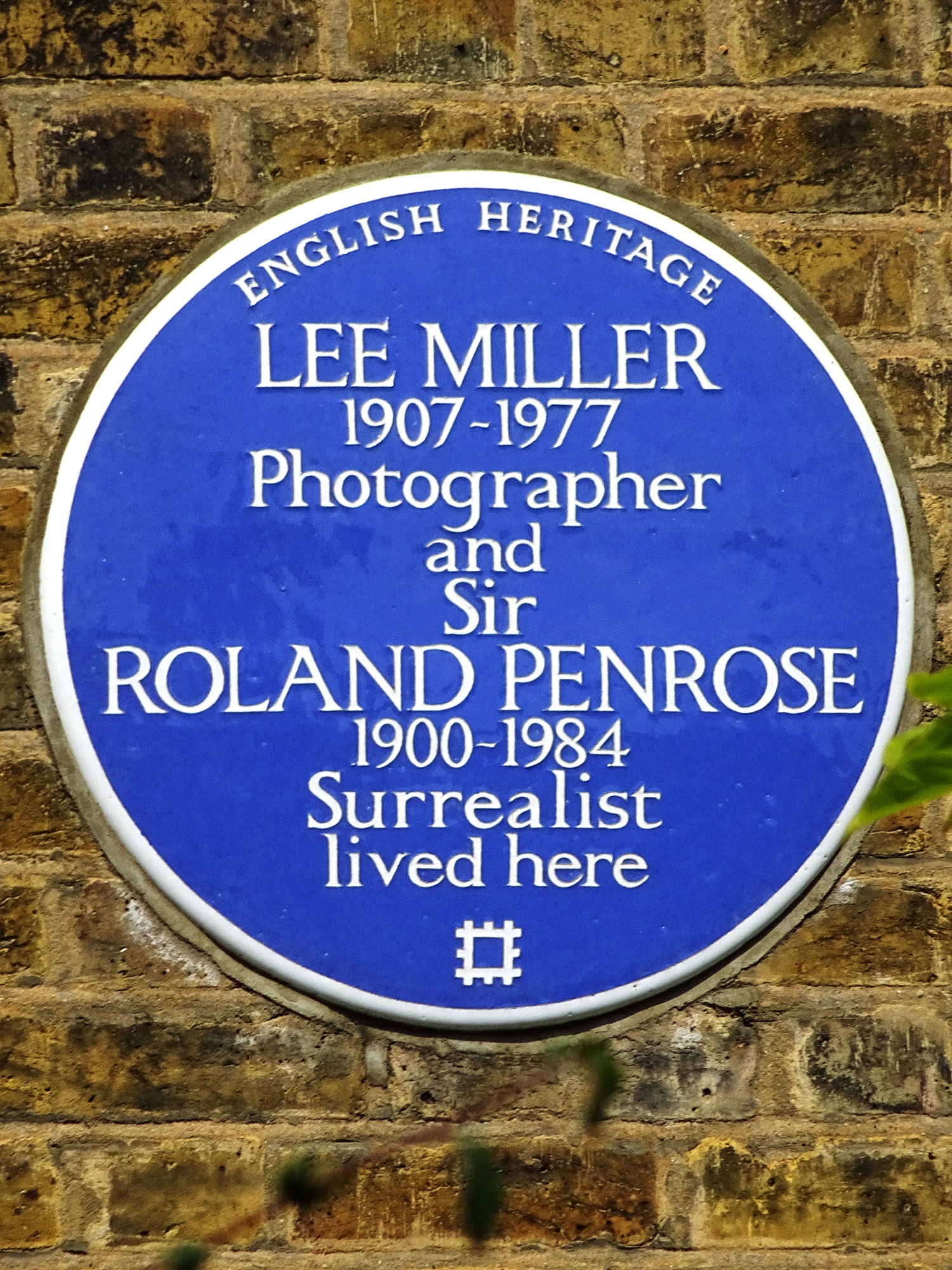
Blue Plaque, 21 Downshire Hill, Hampstead

In 1985, Penrose published the first biography of Miller, entitled The Lives of Lee Miller. Since then, a number of books, mostly accompanying exhibitions of her photographs, have been written by art historians and writers such as Jane Livingston, Richard Calvocoressi, and Mark Haworth-Booth. Penrose and David Scherman collaborated on the book Lee Miller's War: Photographer and Correspondent With the Allies in Europe 1944–45, in 1992. Interviews with Penrose form the core of the 1995 documentary Lee Miller: Through the Mirror, made with Scherman and writer-director Sylvain Roumette. The audiobook Surrealism Reviewed was published in 2002, and a 1946 radio interview with Miller can be heard on it.^{Missing ref.}

A blue plaque was attached to Miller's and Penrose's residence at 21 Downshire Hill, Hampstead, London.

In 2005, Miller's life story was turned into a musical, Six Pictures of Lee Miller, with music and lyrics by British composer Jason Carr. It premiered at the Chichester Festival Theatre, West Sussex. Also in 2005, Carolyn Burke's substantial biography, Lee Miller, A Life, was published.

In 2007, Traces of Lee Miller: Echoes from St. Malo, an interactive CD and DVD about Miller's war photography in St. Malo, was released with the support of Hand Productions and Sussex University.

In 2012, dream pop band Cigarettes After Sex released their EP 'I.' which featured a picture of Miller on the cover. The original work was titled "Anatomies" by Man Ray was taken in 1930 during Miller and Ray's time in Paris together. The photo prominently features Miller's neck with her head thrown backwards.

In 2015, an exhibition of Miller's photographs at the Scottish National Portrait Gallery, Lee Miller and Picasso, focused "on the relationship between Lee Miller, Roland Penrose and Pablo Picasso".

Two works of historical fiction, that build their stories around Miller's life, work, and relationship with Man Ray in Paris circa 1930, were a book written by Dana Gynther titled The Woman in the Photograph, published in 2015, and The Age of Light, by Whitney Scharer, released in 2019.

Penrose's 1985 biography of Miller was the basis for the 2023 film by Ellen Kuras, Lee, with Kate Winslet starring as Miller. Most of the film shows Miller during World War II, depicting the occasions for some of her most well known pictures from the Blitz, the liberation of Paris, and the Dachau and Buchenwald concentration camps, and including a glimpse into the relationships with main characters in her life, such as her colleague photojournalist David Scherman, British Vogue editor Audrey Withers, and her husband Roland Penrose.

The 2024 film Civil War refers to Miller through the character of Lee Smith; Smith is presented by the film's fiction as being a famed war photographer in much the same way as Miller and has the same first name as her.

In Fall 2025, a scrapbook assembled by darkroom assistant Roland Haupt of unpublished photographs by Miller and Cecil Beaton surfaced from a private collection; photography dealer Michael Hoppen arranged the sale of the scrapbook to the University of Oxford's Bodleian Libraries in April 2026. The scrapbook includes Miller's World War II photographs, as well as portraits of celebrities.

== Exhibitions ==
- 2001: Roland Penrose and Lee Miller: The Surrealist and the Photographer, Scottish National Gallery of Modern Art, Edinburgh
- 2007–2008: The Art of Lee Miller, Victoria and Albert Museum, London
  - 2008: Philadelphia Museum of Art
  - 2008: San Francisco Museum of Modern Art
  - 2008–2009: Galerie nationale du Jeu de Paume
- 2015: Lee Miller and Picasso, Scottish National Portrait Gallery, Edinburgh
- 2015–2016: Lee Miller, Albertina, Vienna
  - Museum of Art Fort Lauderdale
  - Berliner Festspiele: Martin-Gropius-Bau, Berlin
- 2018–2019: Lee Miller and Surrealism in Britain, The Hepworth Wakefield, Wakefield
  - Fundació Joan Miró, Barcelona
- 2023–2024: Surrealist Lee Miller, Heide Museum of Modern Art, Melbourne
- 2024: Lee Miller: A Photographer at Work (1932–1945), The Image Centre, Toronto
- 2024: Lee Miller, Saint-Malo under Siege August 1944, Sainte-Victoire Chapel, Saint-Malo
- 2025: Lee Miller in Print, FOMU, Antwerp
- 2025–2026: Lee Miller, Tate Britain, London; travels to Musée d'Art Moderne de Paris and The Art Institute of Chicago

== Bibliography ==
- Allmer, Patricia (2016). Lee Miller: Photography, Surrealism, and Beyond. Manchester University Press. ISBN 978-0-7190-8547-5.
- Bouhassane, Ami (2019). Lee Miller. Eiderdown Books. ISBN 978-1-916041-64-6.
- Burke, Carolyn (2005). Lee Miller, a Life. New York: Knopf. ISBN 0-37540147-4.
  - Paperback edition (2007): University of Chicago Press, ISBN 0-22608067-6.
- Calvocoressi, Richard (2002). Lee Miller: Portraits from a Life. Thames & Hudson. ISBN 0-500-54260-0.
- Carter, Ernestine, ed. (1941). Grim Glory. Pictures of Britain under Fire. Edward R. Murrow (foreword), Lee Miller a. o. (photographs). London/Bradford: Lund Humphries/Scribners.
- Clayton, Eleanor (2018). Lee Miller and Surrealism in Britain. Lund Humphries. ISBN 978-1-84822-272-4.
- Conekin, Becky E. (2013). Lee Miller in Fashion. New York: Monacelli. ISBN 978-1-58093-376-6.
- Conley, Katharine (2013). Surrealist Ghostliness. University of Nebraska Press. ISBN 978-0-8032-2659-3.
- Floe, Hilary and Saskia Flower (2025). Lee Miller (exhibition catalog, Tate Modern, Musée d'Art Moderne de Paris and Art Institute of Chicago). New Haven: Yale University Press. ISBN 978-0-300-28546-8.
- Haworth-Booth, Mark (2007). The Art of Lee Miller (exhibition catalogue, Victoria and Albert Museum). London/New Haven: V & A Publ./Yale University Press. ISBN 978-0-300-12375-3.
- Mackrell, Judith (2023). The Correspondents: Six Women Writers on the Front Lines of World War II. New York: Knopf Doubleday. ISBN 978-0-59347115-9.
- Moser, Walter; Schröder, Klaus Albrecht, eds. (2015). Lee Miller (exhibition catalogue, Albertina, Vienna) (in German and English). Ostfildern, Germany: Hatje Cantz. ISBN 978-3-7757-3955-9.
- Muir, Robin; Butchart, Amber; Bouhassane, Ami (introduction) (2021). Lee Miller: Fashion in Wartime Britain. Lee Miller Archives/Farley's House and Gallery. ISBN 978-0-9532389-8-9.
- Noel-Johnson, Victoria (2023). Lee Miller / Man Ray: Fashion – Love – War. London/New York: Thames & Hudson/Skira. ISBN 9788857244150.
- Penrose, Antony (1985). The Lives of Lee Miller. London: Thames & Hudson. ISBN 0-03005833-3.
  - Paperback edition (1988): ISBN 0-500-27509-2 (several printings).
  - New pb. edition (2021): ISBN 978-0-500-29428-4.
  - New pb. edition (2024): on occasion of the release of the film Lee, with Kate Winslet on cover. ISBN 978-0-500-29752-0.
- Penrose, Antony (2019). Surrealist Lee Miller. Lee Miller Archives/Farley's House and Gallery. ISBN 978-0-9532389-3-4.
- Penrose, Antony (2022). Surrealist Weekends. Farley in the Fifties. Lee Miller Archives/Farley's House and Gallery. ISBN 978-1-91429801-1.
- Penrose, Antony; Macweeney, Alen (2001). The Home of the Surrealists: Lee Miller, Roland Penrose and Their Circle at Farley Farm. London: Frances Lincoln/Lee Miller Archives. ISBN 0-71121726-2.
- Penrose, Antony; Slusher, Katherine (2007). Lee Miller: Picasso in Private/Picasso en privado/Picasso en privat. Barcelona: Picasso Museum. Ajuntament de Barcelona, Institut de Cultura. ISBN 978-8-49850019-6.
- Penrose, Antony (2023). Lee Miller: Photographs. Foreword by Kate Winslet. London: Thames & Hudson. ISBN 978-0-500-02592-5.
- Penrose, Roland (1939). Mesens, E. L. T. (ed.). The Road Is Wider Than Long. An Image Diary from the Balkans July-August 1938. Series of Surrealist Poetry No. 1. Edition of 500 + 10. London: Gallery Editions.
  - (1980): London: Arts Council of Great Britain, ISBN 0-7287-0235-5.
  - (2003): Oxford: Oxford University Press, Los Angeles: Getty Publications, ISBN 0-89236-716-4.
  - (2021): Muddles Green, Sussex: Lee Miller Archives, ISBN 978-0-95323899-6.
- Roland Penrose, Lee Miller: The Surrealist and the Photographer (exhibition catalogue, Dean Gallery). Edinburgh: Scottish National Gallery of Modern Art. 2001. ISBN 1-903278-20-1.
- Prodger, Philip; Hartigan, Lynda Roscoe; Penrose, Antony (2011). Man Ray / Lee Miller: Partners in Surrealism (exhibition catalogue, Peabody Essex Museum, Montclair Art Museum, and Fine Arts Museums of San Francisco). New York/Salem, Massachusetts: Merrell/Peabody Essex Museum. ISBN 978-1-85894-557-6.
- Roberts, Hilary; Penrose, Antony (2015). Lee Miller: A Woman's War. Thames & Hudson. ISBN 978-0-500-51818-2.
- Rosenblum, Naomi (1994). A History of Women Photographers. New York: Abbeville. ISBN 1-55859761-1.
- Slusher, Katherine (2007). Lee Miller and Roland Penrose: The Green Memories of Desire. Munich/New York/London: Prestel. ISBN 978-3791337623.
- van Kampen-Prein, Saskia (2024). Lee Miller in Print (exhibition catalogue). Rotterdam: Museum Boijmans van Beuningen. ISBN 978-90-6918-330-5.
