= Wolf Totem (film) =

2015 Chinese-French film

- Chinese theatrical release poster
- Traditional Chinese: 狼圖騰
- Simplified Chinese: 狼图腾
- Literal meaning: wolf totem
- Hanyu Pinyin: láng túténg
- Directed by: Jean-Jacques Annaud
- Screenplay by: Jean-Jacques Annaud; Alain Godard; John Collee; Lu Wei
- Based on: Wolf Totem by Jiang Rong
- Produced by: Jean-Jacques Annaud; Xavier Castaño; La Peikang; Bill Kong
- Starring: Feng Shaofeng; Shawn Dou; Ankhnyam Ragchaa; Basen Zhabu; Yin Zhusheng
- Cinematography: Jean-Marie Dreujou
- Edited by: Reynald Bertrand
- Music by: James Horner
- Production company: (see notes)
- Distributed by: China Film Co., Ltd. (China); Mars Distribution (France)
- Release dates: 19 February 2015 (China); 25 February 2015 (France)
- Running time: 121 minutes
- Countries: China; France
- Languages: Mandarin; Mongolian
- Budget: US$38 million
- Box office: US$125.7 million

Wolf Totem (Chinese: 狼图腾, French: Le dernier loup, "The Last Wolf") is a 2015 drama film based on the 2004 Chinese semi-autobiographical novel of the same name by Jiang Rong. Directed by French director Jean-Jacques Annaud, the Chinese-French co-production features a Chinese student who is sent to Inner Mongolia to teach shepherds and instead learns about the wolf population, which is under threat by a government apparatchik.

The Beijing Forbidden City Film Corporation initially sought to hire a Chinese director, but filming humans with real wolves was considered too difficult. New Zealand director Peter Jackson was approached, but production did not take place. Annaud, whose 1997 film Seven Years in Tibet is banned in China, had his personal ban lifted and was hired to direct Wolf Totem. The film was produced under China Film Group and French-based Reperage. The French director, who had worked with animals on other films, acquired a dozen wolf pups in China and had them trained for several years by Andrew Simpson, a Canadian-based animal trainer. With a production budget of US$38 million, Annaud filmed Wolf Totem in Inner Mongolia, where the book is set, for over a year.

The film premiered at the European Film Market on February 7, 2015. It was released in China on February 19, 2015, for the start of the Chinese New Year, and it was released in France on February 25, 2015. It was originally reported that the film had been selected as the Chinese entry for the Best Foreign Language Film at the 88th Academy Awards. However, when the final list was announced by the academy, China's submission was listed as Go Away Mr. Tumor by Han Yan. The film was the final film released in James Horner's lifetime before his death four months later in June 2015.

== Premise ==
In 1969, student Chen Zhen (simplified Chinese: 陈阵; traditional Chinese: 陳陣) is sent to the Chinese region of Inner Mongolia to teach shepherds. Instead, he learns about the shepherds and the bond they share with the wolves, a bond that is threatened by a government apparatchik.

== Cast ==
- Feng Shaofeng as Chen Zhen
- Shawn Dou as Yang Ke
- Ankhnyam Ragchaa as Gasma
- Basen Zhabu as Bilig
- Yin Zhusheng as Bao Shungui
- Baoyingexige
- Tumenbayar
- Xilindule
- Bao Hailong

== Production ==
Wolf Totem is based on the 2004 Chinese semi-autobiographical novel Wolf Totem written by Jiang Rong. French director Jean-Jacques Annaud, despite a history with China, adapted the film, which was produced by China Film Group, Edko Films, and Reperage. Chinese censors had allowed the book to be published, and it became a bestseller in China. The Los Angeles Times reported that many were surprised by the novel's lack of censorship. The newspaper said, "The protagonist expresses contempt for the group-think that China's majority Han ethnicity forces on ethnic minorities and disdains the Confucian principles that the Communist Party has recently revived in its political rhetoric even in the 21st century." Rights to the novel were acquired by Beijing Forbidden City Film Corporation in 2004. Its CEO Zhang Qiang approached Chinese directors to adapt the book, but filming humans with real wolves was considered too challenging. In 2005, the corporation entered an agreement with New Zealand director Peter Jackson and his company Weta Digital to co-produce a film adaptation. Production with Jackson did not take place, and Beijing Forbidden City struggled to find a new director to film the adaptation. According to Annaud, the producers sought to produce a film adaptation to release in time for the 2008 Summer Olympics in Beijing. In 2008, English- and French-language versions of the novel were published. Jiamin and his friends at the production company were familiar with Annaud's films and approached the director for the task. Annaud said of their choosing a French director for adapting the novel, "They said a Chinese director can't say these things; that it's too sensitive. They didn't want an American. I'm sort of neutral. And I have made a lot of films with animals." The director read the book in French, and the story appealed to him. He said, "It has been my conviction to find true stories about the environment." He turned down an offer to film Life of Pi (2012), and he instead signed a contract with Qiang.

Inner Mongolia (above in red) is an autonomous region of China. The novel is set in Inner Mongolia, and the film was also produced there.

By August 2009, Annaud began developing the project and scouting locations in China with Jiamin, whom he had befriended. The filmmakers acquired wolves to raise and train in preparation for filming. The director worked on the first outline with writing partner Alain Godard, who died before they finished it. Annaud brought a draft to China in mid-2012. Chinese screenwriter Lu Wei wrote the second and third drafts of the screenplay. The draft was translated to French for Annaud to give feedback, and it was subsequently translated back to Chinese for Jiamin to revise. Preliminary filming of Wolf Totem began in July 2012.

By 2013, Qiang had moved on to become vice president of China Film Group, which now backed the film. Bill Kong, CEO of Edko Films, had joined the project in 2010. In April 2013, a co-production deal between China Film Group and Edko Films was signed at the Beijing Film Market. Actors William Feng Shaofeng and Shawn Dou were cast in the leading roles. The film marked the first Chinese production by a non-Chinese director. For filming, 420 Chinese and seven French crew members were hired. Annaud filmed Wolf Totem in Inner Mongolia, the region of China where the book is set, near the town of Wulugai. Filming in Inner Mongolia lasted for over a year. The website China.org.cn reported, "The director and his team had to overcome harsh difficulties in the wild, such as low temperatures, extremely bad weather, [and] mosquito swarm attacks." To preserve the grasslands, Annaud had his crew walk to locations with the equipment wherever possible, avoiding use of vehicles, despite the slower process making production more costly. The director said he sometimes walked over 10 kilometers to that end. Annaud said one of the most challenging scenes was depicting a pack of wolves attacking horses during a blizzard in the middle of the night. A prop horse marked with the scent of sausage, and filmmaking grips pushed the horse away from the wolves so they would chase it. Some footage was also filmed in Beijing. Annaud filmed Wolf Totem in 3D. The production budget totaled US$40 million.

== Animal training ==
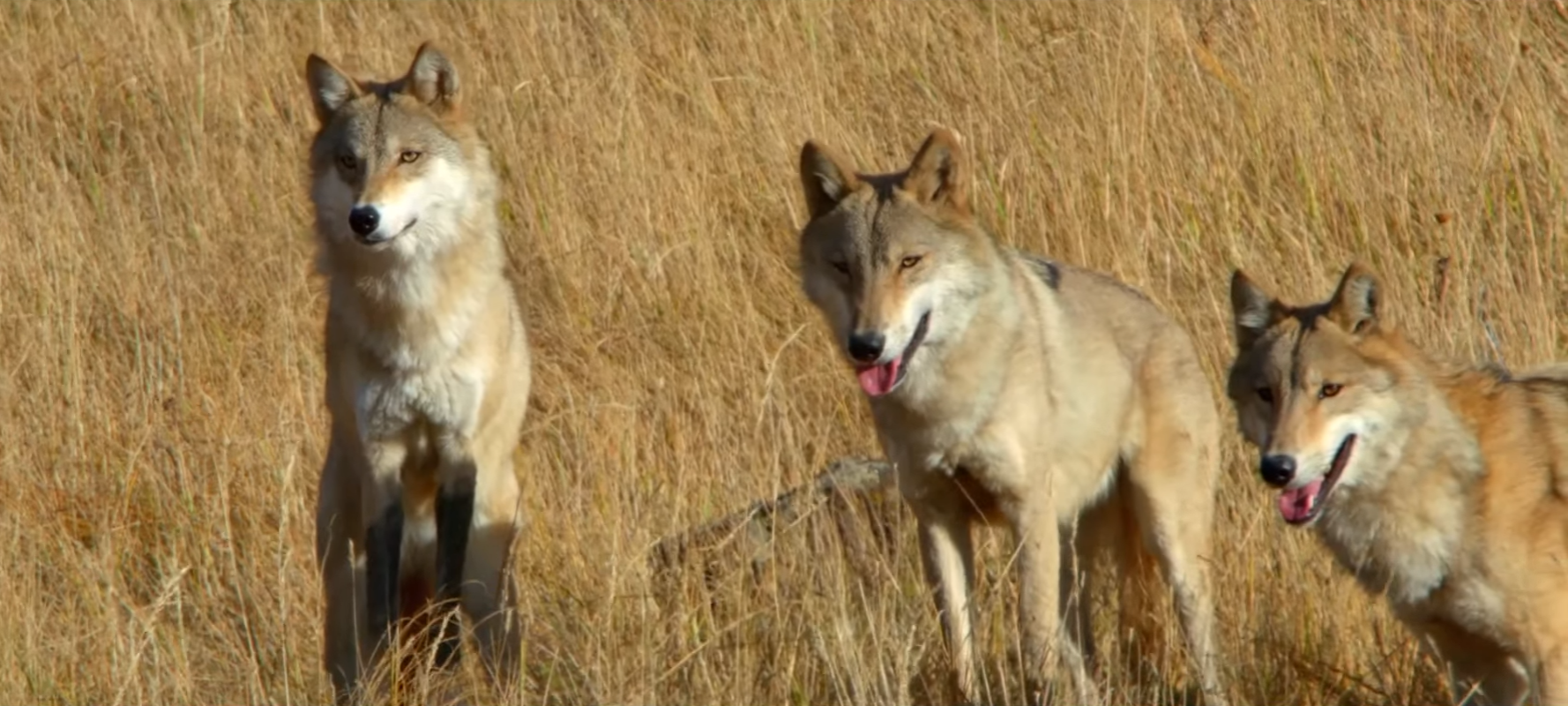
Mongolian wolves (Canis lupus chanco) used in the film

In the novel and the film, Chen Zhen is sent to work on the steppes of Inner Mongolia (a region of China) during the Cultural Revolution, and a government official orders all wolves in the region to be killed. The filmmakers used real Mongolian wolves (Canis lupus chanco) for the film. Annaud had experience filming with animals in his previous films The Bear (1988) and Two Brothers (2004), working with bears and tigers respectively. He said dogs were traditionally used to depict wolves in film but that he sought to use actual wolves to show authentically their hunting method.

Annaud and others visited zoos around China to find wolf pups to acquire for the film. He said, "Wolves in Mongolia are very different from North American wolves. They are brown with bright eyes. They are more the color of lions." A dozen pups were acquired from a local zoo in Harbin. The filmmakers hired Scottish animal trainer Andrew Simpson to raise and train the wolves, which ultimately numbered 35. Since China has a dwindling wolf population, the government did not allow any wolves to leave. Simpson moved from his ranch in Canada to China to train the wolves to sit, snarl, and fight on cue. Four bases were built in Inner Mongolia and in Beijing for raising and training the wolves. The wolves were trained for over four years to be used in the film. Training revolved around feeding the wolves. They had a diet of dried dog food and chopped chicken, but during training, Simpson fed them "ruby red cubes" of fresh meat. The wolves were kept under control behind long, double fences and were trained not to avoid the cameras. During filming, the crew permitted the wolves to rest every hour. Despite precautions, actor Feng Shaofeng was injured by a wolf. While Annaud filmed live footage of the wolves, he planned to use technology in post-production to create scenes that would normally be impossible to film. After filming, the wolves were ultimately relocated to Canada since they only understood commands in English.

Other animals were also prepared for filming. The Mongolian gazelle was difficult to find in Inner Mongolia, so filmmakers had to travel to the neighboring country of Mongolia to acquire gazelles.

== Director's relationship with China ==
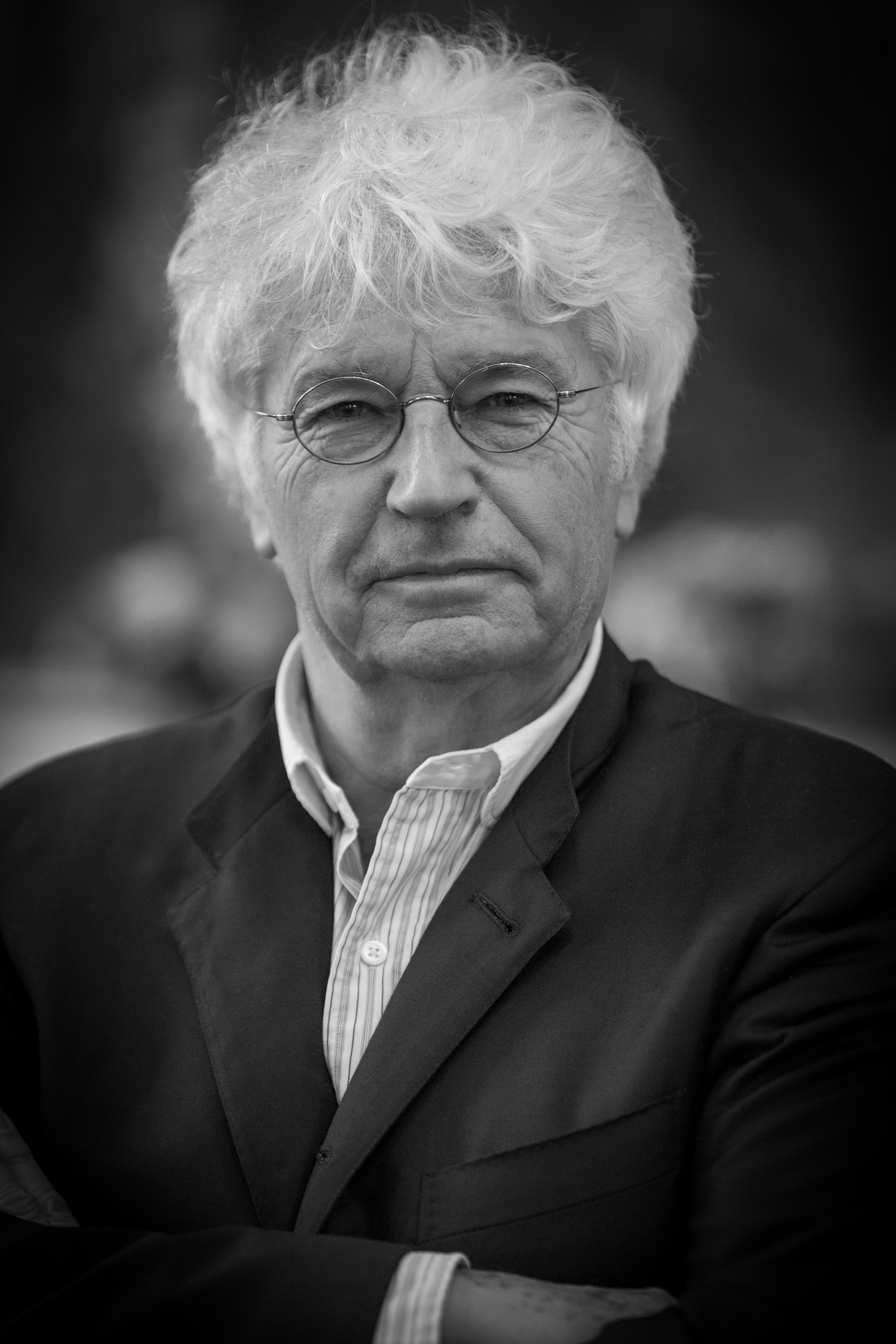
French director Jean-Jacques Annaud (pictured above in 2015)

French director Jean-Jacques Annaud filmed Seven Years in Tibet (1997), which is banned in China. Annaud himself was also banned from entering the country at the time. Chinese authorities took issue with how Seven Years in Tibet portrayed the People's Liberation Army in their invasion of Tibet in 1949. They also took issue with Jetsun Pema, the sister of the exiled 14th Dalai Lama, being cast in the film. Annaud was able to have his personal ban lifted, though Seven Years in Tibet is still banned in China to date. The Wall Street Journal said that Annaud's hiring was "a surprise to some" due to this history. Variety said it was ironic for China Film Group, which is state-backed, to produce Wolf Totem while Seven Years in Tibet was still banned.

Annaud said in 2012 that he was mistaken in assuming that it was acceptable to cover historical conflicts in retrospect, like with France, Algeria, and the Algerian War. The director said, "My mistake was to think that it was the same in China regarding Tibet. I realize now that it was seen as something very intrusive, which was not my intention." He said he did not have to apologize for directing the film. He said, "I offended China with Seven Years and it's quite something that after this we have decided not to speak about it. I'm very grateful; it says a lot about China today." The director described Wolf Totem as "much more complicated, fascinating, amusing" than others realize. The director said he would not have made the film if Chinese authorities did not like it. The Associated Press said in 2009, "Annaud will have to make an apolitical interpretation of the novel to pass Chinese film censorship." It reported that Beijing Forbidden City Film Co. avoided the book's political message and instead described it as "an environmental protection-themed novel about the relationship between man and nature, man and animal".

In the weeks leading up to Wolf Totem's release, Annaud said that Chinese censors did not modify his screenplay. Reuters said, "[The film] deals with conservation themes head on, though it largely avoids the book's more subtle political issues." The Economist said Annaud originally said that he did not have to apologize for Seven Years in Tibet but that he had apologized in December 2009, "In an open letter circulated in Chinese online (a liberal but generally fair translation, he says), Mr. Annaud declared he had 'never supported Tibet's independence' and had no 'personal relationship' with the Dalai Lama." The Economist said Annaud's self-criticism likely helped protect the film against Chinese critics who did not support its production.

== Chinese-French relations in film ==
In January 2015, Entgroup cited Annaud's involvement with Wolf Totem as part of a trend that European directors were turning to China instead of Hollywood. Yibada reported, "The French filmmaker told reporters that he is aware that he might have been an exception in the realm of censorship, as the film is being promoted as an exemplar of Sino-French cultural relations." The Hollywood Reporter said with Wolf Totem's debut, "Execs are keen to learn about France's expertise in pacting with the world's second largest film market." A co-production treaty between China and France was signed in 2010, and Wolf Totem was among the first eight official co-productions to date.

== Theatrical screenings ==
The film premiered at the European Film Market on February 7, 2015. It was released in China on February 19, 2015, the start of the Chinese New Year. It was released in France on February 25, 2015. Alibaba Pictures acquired rights to distribute Wolf Totem in territories outside of the United States.

The French film company Wild Bunch acquired European sales rights for Wolf Totem at the European Film Market in February 2013. Wild Bunch held a private screening of the film at the 7th UniFrance Rendez-vous for distributors who bought rights and for interested German buyers. Variety reported, "Buzz... is that director Jean-Jacques Annaud is back."

Wolf Totem had preview screenings in China starting on February 14, 2015. The film grossed US$7.4 million in preview screenings. The film was officially released in China on February 19, 2015 for the start of the Chinese New Year.

With the presence of Ankhnyam Ragchaa, the movie premiered in Ulaanbaatar, Mongolia on 27 February 2015. A Mongolian-language version of the film will also be released so audiences unfamiliar with Mandarin Chinese could see it.

The film grossed US$122,745,328 worldwide, with US$110.95 million from China and US$8,811,832 from France.

== Critical reception ==
Wolf Totem received mixed to positive reviews. As of June 2020, the film holds a 67% approval rating on Rotten Tomatoes, based on 30 reviews with an average rating of 6.55 out of 10. The consensus states: "As a visual experience, Wolf Totem boasts thrills that compensate for the significant narrative sacrifices made in bringing Jiang Rong's novel to the screen." On Metacritic, the film holds a score of 58 out of 100, based on 13 reviews, signifying "mixed or average reviews".

Maggie Lee, reviewing for Variety, said, "Despite its magnificent natural vistas and some pulse-pounding action in stunning 3D, 'Wolf Totem' boils down to a familiar environmentalist allegory that doesn't move or provoke too deeply." Lee said Jean-Marie Dreujou's cinematography "rivetingly conveys" the wolves' primal behavior but that the film failed to authentically dramatize the friction between humans and animals. She found the film to lack any "new perspective to environmental themes long expounded on in the West" and that the screenplay "considerably softened" the devastation and led to a weak conclusion. The critic also found the book's "thought-provoking cultural-political subtext" missing from the film and that the film's character development was weak with a "too muted" potential romance introduced late in the film. Lee commended the visual effects of the wolves in motion and composer James Horner's score for its "strong emotional sweep" in non-dialogue scenes.

== Accolades ==
Ceremony	Category	Recipient	Result
Beijing International Film Festival	Best Picture	Wolf Totem	Nominated
Beijing International Film Festival	Best Director	Jean-Jacques Annaud	Won
Beijing International Film Festival	Best Visual Effects	Christian Rajaud and Jianquan Guo	Won
Beijing College Student Film Festival	Best Film	Wolf Totem	Nominated
Beijing College Student Film Festival	Best Director	Jean-Jacques Annaud	Won
Camerimage	Main Competition (Golden Frog)	Jean-Marie Dreujou	Nominated
Camerimage	Best 3D Film	Jean-Marie Dreujou	Nominated
China Film Director's Guild Awards	Best Screenplay	Wei Lu	Nominated
Golden Horse Film Festival and Awards	Best Visual Effects	Christian Rajaud and Jianquan Guo	Nominated
Golden Rooster Awards	Best Picture	Wolf Totem	Won
Golden Rooster Awards	Best Art Director	Rongzhe Quan	Won
Golden Rooster Awards	Best Sound	Gang Wang	Nominated
Hong Kong Film Award	Best Film from Mainland and Taiwan	Wolf Totem	Nominated
Hundred Flowers Awards	Best Actor	Feng Shaofeng	Won
International Film Music Critics Award	Best Original Score for a Drama Film	James Horner	Won
International Film Music Critics Award	Film Score of the Year	James Horner	Nominated
International Film Music Critics Award	Film Music Composition of the Year	James Horner	Nominated
Macau International Movie Festival	Best Picture	Jean-Jacques Annaud	Won
Macau International Movie Festival	Best Director	Jean-Jacques Annaud	Won
Macau International Movie Festival	Best Cinematography	Jean-Marie Dreujou	Won
Saturn Award	Best DVD or Blu-ray Release	Wolf Totem	Nominated
Shanghai Film Critics Awards	Film of Merit	Wolf Totem	Won

== Notes ==
- Variety details the production, "(China-France) A Mars Distribution (in France)/China Film Co., Ltd. (in China)/Edko Films (in Hong Kong) release of a China Film Co., Beijing Forbidden City Film Co., Reperage, China Movie Channel, Beijing Phoenix Entertainment Co., Chinavision Media Group, Mars Films, Wild Bunch Groupe Herodiade, Loull Prod. presentation of a China Film Co., Ltd., Loull Prod. production."
