= John Collee =

British screenwriter

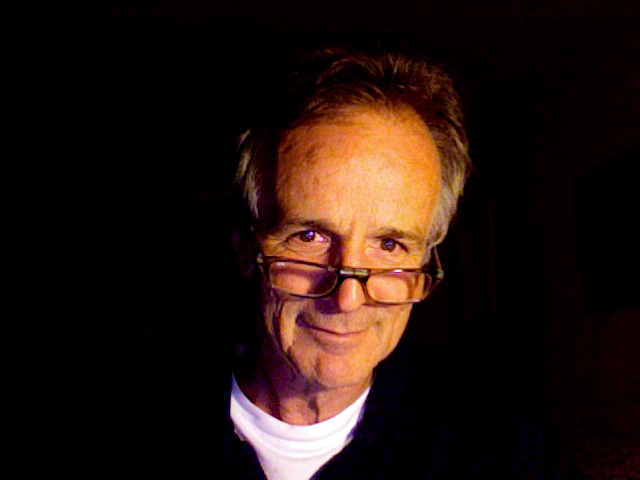
- Born: John Gerald Collee; 1955 (age 70–71)
- Occupations: Screenwriter; novelist; doctor
- Website: www.johncollee.com

John Gerald Collee (born 1955) is a Scottish/Australian doctor, novelist and screenwriter whose films have three times been nominated for Oscars. Master and Commander was nominated for Best Film in 2003, Happy Feet won Best Animation in 2006, and Tanna (2015) was nominated for Best Foreign Language Feature in 2015. His many other films, written or co-written, include Creation (2009), Hotel Mumbai (2018) and Lee. His novels include Kingsley's Touch, A Paper Mask, and The Rig. His TV adaptation of Boy Swallows Universe received critical acclaim upon release on Netflix in 2024.

== Background ==
Collee was born in 1955 to Isobel Galbraith and Prof J. Gerald Collee CBE, who became professor of microbiology at the University of Edinburgh. Collee grew up in Edinburgh, Scotland and in India. He studied medicine at the University of Edinburgh and began practising medicine in Cambridge, Bath, and Bristol. In his third year of practice, he wrote the medical thriller Kingsley's Touch, which was published in 1984. Collee subsequently worked in emergency medicine at home and abroad in Gabon, Madagascar, and Sri Lanka. His second novel titled A Paper Mask was published in 1987. Rights to the novel were acquired for a film adaptation, and Collee wrote the screenplay for director Christopher Morahan and Granada, who released the film Paper Mask in 1990. Around the time that his third novel The Rig was published, in 1991, Collee became a columnist for The Observer and wrote articles about travel, science and medicine, weekly for the next six years.

While escorting medical supplies to Azerbaijan in the former Soviet Union, Collee met his wife Deborah Snow - Moscow-based correspondent for the Australian Broadcasting Corporation. The following year, and mid-way through writing a book about Soviet medicine called The Kingdom of the Blind, Collee accepted a medical post in the Solomon Islands. The couple had their first child, Lauren, on the islands. then both worked in London for a short time before moving to Sydney, Australia where Collee joined forces with Australian directors Peter Weir and George Miller. With Weir, Collee wrote the screenplay for the Oscar-nominated Master and Commander: The Far Side of the World, and with Miller he wrote the Oscar-winning Happy Feet. He wrote an early (uncredited) draft of The Legend of Tarzan (2016) for Warner Bros. with Guillermo del Toro slated to direct. The movie was later directed by David Yates.

Creation reunited him with Paul Bettany and he later executive-produced The Water Diviner with Russell Crowe directing. Tanna was a collaboration with anthropological film-makers Bentley Dean and Martin Butler which was shortlisted for an Oscar in the foreign language category. Wolf Totem with director Jean-Jacques Annaud made upwards of $100M at the Chinese box office. After co-writing Hotel Mumbai, which starred actor Dev Patel, he collaborated with Patel on the actor's first film as director, Monkey Man. His most recent films are Lee (with co-writer Marion Hume), about war correspondent Lee Miller, starring Kate Winslet; and The Return, taken from The Odyssey, starring Ralph Fiennes as Odysseus and Juliette Binoche as Penelope.

John Collee was one of four co-founders of the Australian production company Hopscotch Features. He was also, for many years, a board member of the Australian branch of climate activist group 350.org. and, until recently, vice-president of the Australian Writers Guild

== Filmography ==
Screenwriter

- Bergerac - four TV episodes (BBC1, 1988–1990)
- Star Cops - three TV episodes (BBC2, 1987)
- Paper Mask (1990) - based on Collee's novel.
- The Heart Surgeon – two-part TV serial (BBC1 1997)
- Master and Commander: The Far Side of the World (2003) – with director Peter Weir; based on the novels by Patrick O'Brian.
- Happy Feet (2006) – credited with director and co-directors.
- Creation (2009) - based on the biography of Charles Darwin by Randal Keynes.
- Walking with Dinosaurs (2013)
- Wolf Totem (2015) – credited with director and two others; based on the novel by Jiang Rong.
- Tanna (2015) – credited with directors.
- The Patriarch (2016) – based on a novel by Witi Ihimaera.
- Hotel Mumbai (2018)
- Lee (2023) - credited with Marion Hume and two others.
- The Return (2024) - credited with Edward Bond and director Uberto Pasolini.

Executive producer

- Son of a Gun (2014)
- The Water Diviner (2014)
- The Guests (short) (2015)

Year	Title	Role	Budget
1990	Paper Mask	Writer (novel, screenplay)	
2003	Master and Commander: The Far Side of the World	Writer	$150 million
2006	Candy	Script Editor	
2006	Happy Feet	Writer	$100 million
2009	Creation	Writer (screen story, screenplay)	$10 million
2013	Walking with Dinosaurs 3D	Writer (screenplay)	$80 million
2014	Son of a Gun	Executive producer, script consultant, writer (additional material)	
2014	The Water Diviner	Executive producer	$22 million
2015	Wolf Totem	Writer	$38 million
2015	Tanna	Writer	
2016	The Patriarch	Writer (screenplay)	
2018	Hotel Mumbai	Executive producer, writer	$21 million
2023	Whale Nation	Writer (English adaptation)	
2023	Lee	Co-writer (story & screenplay), executive producer	
2024	Monkey Man	Writer	$30 million
2024	Furiosa: A Mad Max Saga	Story consultant	$135 million
2024	Boy Swallows Universe (TV Series)	Writer (8 episodes), executive producer (8 episodes)	
2024	The Return	Writer	

== See also ==
- List of Scottish novelists

== Bibliography ==
- Collee, John (1984). Kingsley's Touch. St. Martin's Press. ISBN 978-0-312-45617-7.
- Collee, John (1987). A Paper Mask. Arbor House/William Morrow. ISBN 978-1-55710-026-9.
- Collee, John (1991). The Rig. Morrow. ISBN 978-0-688-11482-4.
