= China University of Labor Relations =

Public college in Haidian, Beijing, China

- 中国劳动关系学院
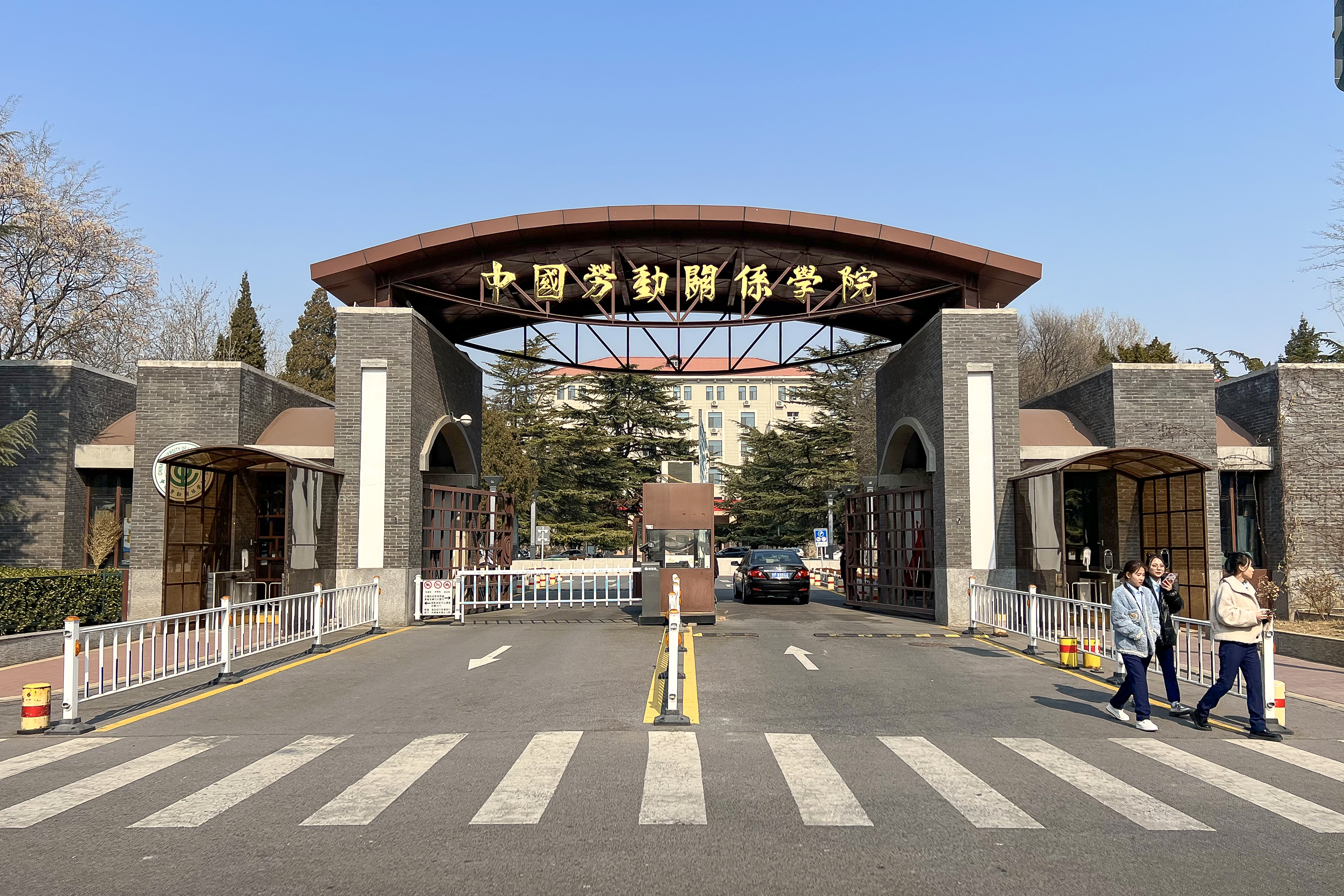
- Front entrance to campus
- Former name: China Institute of Industrial Relations
- Motto: 刚健创新 和而不同
- Motto in English: Vigorous innovation and distinction
- Type: Public
- Established: 1946; 80 years ago
- President: Liu Xiangbing
- Students: Large brick entrance with guard booth and name of university in gold on overhead arch
- Undergraduates: 4653
- Postgraduates: 118
- Location: Haidian, Beijing, China; 39°59′23″N 116°18′19″E
- Campus: Urban
- Colours: Green
- Website: culr.edu.cn

Chinese name
- Simplified Chinese: 中国劳动关系学院
- Traditional Chinese: 中國勞動關係學院
Transcriptions
Standard Mandarin
- Hanyu Pinyin: Zhōngguó Láodòng Guānxì Xuéyuàn

The China University of Labor Relations (CULR) is a public undergraduate college headquartered in Haidian, Beijing, China. It is owned by the All-China Federation of Trade Unions.

Formerly called China Institute of Workers' Movement (中国工运学院), the college originated from the Cadre School for All-China Federation of Trade Unions established in 1946 and was upgraded to a regular college for undergraduate education with the approval of the Ministry of Education of China. With over 6 decades' history, it is a multi-disciplinary college with distinctive features covering economics, management, law study, literature, engineering and art.

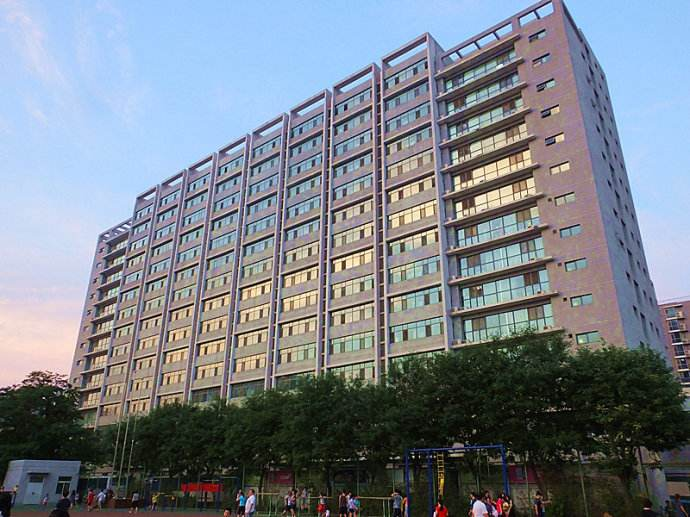
The dorm building at Beijing campus

== History ==
The college history began in the year 1946 with the establishment of the School of Administrative Cadres at Shanxi–Chahar–Hebei Border Area and later became China Institute of Labour Movement offering continuing education to trade unions and the society. After years of explorations and hard work, the college had developed into a nationally influential institute for higher adult education.

Till May 2003, under the influence of China's newly established socialist market economy mechanism, the college was renamed as China Institute of Industrial Relations and upgraded into a regular undergraduate college to meet the new requirements of the developing domestic labor movement for high-level professionals. In 2016, the university's English name was changed to China University of Labor Relations.

== Schools and departments ==
Majors for undergraduate education include labor relations, labor and social insurance, safety engineering, financial management, human resource management, administrative management (on administrative culture building for entrepreneurs and public institutions), business administration, hotel management, economics, politics and administration science, journalism, Chinese language and literature, drama and film-television literature, etc. In December 2012, officially approved by the Academic Degree Committee of the State Council of China, CIIR started the pilot professional master's degree education, with MPA being authorized professional degree. In 2013, CIIR began to recruit graduate students.

Teaching organizations include:

- Department of Labor Relations
- Department of Economic Management
- Department of Public Management
- Department of Safety Engineering
- Law School
- Trade Union School
- School of Cultural Communication
- School of Cadre Training
- School of Advanced Vocational Education
- School of Continuing Education

== Research ==
CULR has senior experts in the fields of trade union theory, labour and employment, industrial relations, labour law, social security legislation, basic labour theory and labour market. Within a long period of time, It has gradually put in place a unique research structure in trade union and labour sciences. There are 10 institutes, such as the Industrial Relations Institute, Enterprise Development Institute, Labour Study Institute, Labour Market Institute and Culture and Communication Institute. They stand in the forefront in the academic excellence in the fields of trade union study, history of workers' movement, industrial relations theory, labour law, labour economics and social security in China. The Journal of China Institute of Industrial Relations is rated as one of the core Chinese political journals and one of the core social journals in China.

== Campus ==
- Beijing campus: No.45, Zengguang Road, Haidian, Beijing.

It is located in the urban area of Beijing besides the West 3rd Ring Road. The nearest subway station is Baishiqiao South Station of Subway Line 6 and Line 9 .

- Zhuozhou campus: Zhuolai Road, Zhuozhou, Hebei Province.

It is located in the western suburb area of Zhuozhou, Hebei Province.

== Notable people ==
- Li Lisan, the first president of the college
- Gao Yuanyuan, film actress, graduated in 2002 with a certificate in public relations
- Jiang Rong (Lü Jiamin), former associate professor, author of best-selling novel Wolf Totem
