= National Committee of the Chinese Agricultural, Forestry and Water Conservancy Workers' Union =

National industrial union in China

- National Committee of the Chinese Agricultural, Forestry and Water Conservancy Workers' Union

The National Committee of the Chinese Agricultural, Forestry and Water Conservancy Workers' Union is a national industrial union of the All-China Federation of Trade Unions in the People's Republic of China.

It is led by the Chinese Communist Party and lacks independence.
