= Marion Hume =

British fashion journalist

- Born: 3 July 1962 (age 63); England
- Occupations: Journalist; editor; screenwriter
- Website: http://www.marionhume.com/

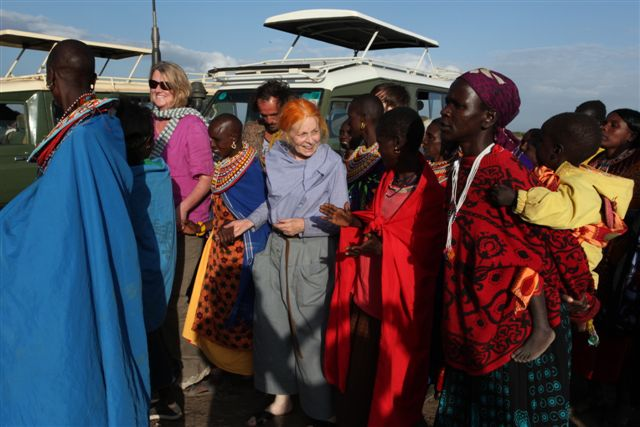
Hume (far left, wearing pink) with Vivienne Westwood in Kenya

Marion Hume (born 3 July 1962) is a journalist, editor, and screenwriter based in London, England. She is best known for having been editor-in-chief of Vogue Australia. Hume was nominated for a BAFTA for Outstanding British Film in 2025 for her screenplay for the film Lee, co-written with John Collee and Liz Hannah.

== Early life and education ==
Hume was born in Birmingham in 1962. She attended Exeter University from 1981 until 1984.

== Career ==
=== 1980s ===
Hume started her fashion writing career at the dawn of the AIDS crisis in London. With Roger Walker-Dack, she co-founded Fashion Acts, one of the first fundraisers for HIV/AIDS causes, working in association with the Terrence Higgins Trust. Fashion Acts generated funds by the sale of photographs donated by talents from across the industry, including Helmut Newton and Linda McCartney. Hume was the Fashion Writer for The Sunday Times from 1988 until 1990.

In 1989 to 1991, Hume worked on and made appearances in the six-part BBC series The Look. Interview subjects included Gianni Versace, Donatella Versace, Giorgio Armani, Ralph Lauren, Donna Karan, and Christian Lacroix. The episode entitled "Runway" was the first to chart the evolution of the Supermodel. Yves Saint Laurent refused to be interviewed for the hour-long documentary about him, although close associates, including Pierre Berge, Catherine Deneuve, Paloma Picasso, and Betty Catroux, did speak on his behalf. Saint Laurent himself was filmed backstage at his haute couture shows and at his 30th Fashion Birthday at the Opera Bastille in Paris. In 2021, Hume was invited to address the students of Central Saint Martins on the making of the series.

=== 1990s ===
Hume was the launch fashion editor of the UK edition of Esquire in 1990. From 1993 to 1996, Hume was fashion editor of The Independent, during which the fashion coverage expanded in both the daily and the Independent on Sunday. Her profiles included Patsy from Ab Fab, aka Joanna Lumley, Lauren Hutton, Veruschka, Fabien Baron, and the photographers Steven Meisel and Peter Lindbergh. She reviewed Alexander McQueen’s first show. A review of a Chanel show entitled "No Way to treat a Lady" started a feud with Karl Lagerfeld, with Hume praised for "not being part of the 'conspiracy of silence'; for her professionalism, her integrity and her independence". In 1996, Hume joined the Financial Times, filing weekly fashion updates. The same year, she was the writer and associate producer of The South Bank Show special on John Galliano (season 20, episode 12, 1997) directed by Nigel Wattis and hosted by Melvyn Bragg.

In 1997, Hume moved to Sydney where she had been appointed editor of Vogue Australia. Her staff included the current editor, Edwina McCann and Creative Director Jill Davison. After 18 months, she was let go and returned to work for Vogue in the US as acting features director. In 1998, Hume worked for Harper's Bazaar as a contributing editor. She was included in Vogue Australia’s 60th anniversary issue in December 2019.

=== Australian Financial Review ===
Hume served as International Fashion Editor for the Australian Financial Review for 14 years during which the magazine won best in class at Australia’s media awards seven times. In 2018, King Charles allowed unprecedented access in his first-ever interview on sustainable fashion.

=== Activism ===
Hume served for five years as the Senior Consultant for the United Nations' ITC Ethical Fashion Initiative linking those at the top of the fashion chain—including Giorgio Armani and Vivienne Westwood—to marginalised artisans in the slums of Nairobi. She served with the United Nations Foundation designing a fund generator using contemporary art by Jeff Koons which raised over US$6 million in a single night for health programs for the under-5s.

During London's first COVID-19 lockdown in the spring of 2020, she founded Siren Call, which linked together those across the fashion industry who would never normally collaborate—including Browns and Primark—to supply non-PPE clothing essentials to more than 8,000 paramedics and other front-line staff serving Greater London.

=== Lee Miller ===
An expert on the American World War II photojournalist Lee Miller, she appears in the BAFTA-winning documentary Lee Miller: A Life on the Front Line, which was first broadcast on BBC 2 in May 2020. Hume is co-writer, with Liz Hannah, and with John Collee on the 2023 film Lee, starring Kate Winslet; which made its debut at Toronto (TIFF 2023). Owing to the SAG-AFTRA strike, it opened one year later, with its London premiere in September 2024. Lee is currently Sky UK's highest-grossing original movie.

== Personal life ==
In 1990, Hume married photographer Peter Hunt. In the early 2000s, she became an Australian citizen.

== Awards ==
- 1985: Honey magazine Young Journalist of the Year Award

== Books ==
- Philip Treacy, Rizzoli 2015 (ISBN 978-0-8478-4650-4)
- Black on White: opinions and reflections about design (contributor, edited by Jose Antonia Gimenez), Hiatus, 2013 (ISBN 978-84-615-2477-8).
- The Fashion Pack, Penguin, 2005 (ISBN 9780670041640).
- The Cutting Edge: 50 years of British Fashion (contributor, edited by Amy de La Haye), The Victoria & Albert Museum, 1998 (ISBN 1851771999).

== Television documentaries ==
- The South Bank Show special: John Galliano, season 20, episode 12, 1997.
- The Look, BBC, 1992.
- The BoF Show with Imran Amed, Bloomberg Quicktake, 2021.

== Filmography ==
- Lee (2023) - screenplay credited with John Collee and Liz Hannah, story credited with John Collee and Lem Dobbs.
