= National Committee of the Chinese Defense Industry, Postal and Telecommunications Workers' Union =

- National Committee of the Chinese Defense Industry, Postal and Telecommunications Workers' Union
- Location: People's Republic of China
- Affiliations: All-China Federation of Trade Unions

The National Committee of the Chinese Defense Industry, Postal and Telecommunications Workers' Union is a national industrial union of the All-China Federation of Trade Unions in the People's Republic of China.
