= Bequest to the Nation (film) =

1973 British historical drama film by James Cellan Jones

- Directed by: James Cellan Jones
- Written by: Terence Rattigan
- Produced by: Hal B. Wallis
- Starring: Glenda Jackson; Peter Finch; Michael Jayston; Anthony Quayle
- Cinematography: Gerry Fisher
- Edited by: Anne V. Coates
- Music by: Michel Legrand
- Production company: Hal Wallis Productions
- Distributed by: Universal Pictures
- Release dates: 18 April 1973 (New York City); 25 April 1973 (London, UK)
- Running time: 118 minutes
- Country: United Kingdom
- Language: English

Bequest to the Nation (U.S. title The Nelson Affair) is a 1973 British historical drama film directed by James Cellan Jones and starring Glenda Jackson, Peter Finch, Michael Jayston and Margaret Leighton. It was written by Terence Rattigan based on his 1970 play A Bequest to the Nation.

== Plot summary ==
The film depicts the relationship between Admiral Lord Nelson and his mistress, Lady Hamilton, during the Napoleonic Wars plus others they would meet, including Nelson's nephew, George Matcham Jr.

Much of the story takes place at Merton Place, Nelson & Hamilton's estate, before Nelson's heading out to sea for the 1805 Battle of Trafalgar.

== Cast ==
- Glenda Jackson as Lady Hamilton
- Peter Finch as Lord Nelson
- Michael Jayston as Captain Hardy
- Anthony Quayle as Lord Minto
- Margaret Leighton as Lady Nelson
- Dominic Guard as George Matcham Jnr, Nelson's nephew
- Nigel Stock as George Matcham Snr, Nelson's brother-in-law
- Roland Culver as Lord Barham
- Barbara Leigh-Hunt as Catherine Matcham, Nelson's sister
- Pat Heywood as Emily
- Clelia Matania as Francesca
- John Nolan as Captain Blackwood

== Critical reception ==
Clyde Jeavons wrote in The Monthly Film Bulletin: "James Cellan Jones, another graduate from television, directs with a pleasing eye for period and lots of respect for both author and cast, but (perhaps in his eagerness to show he is making a film, not filming a play) he seriously mishandles the climactic battle scenes, dwelling too lovingly on gory special effects and reducing Nelson's death to absurdity by a sudden switch to ponderous slow-motion. ... Peter Finch, while not quite suggesting the insatiable sexual athlete Rattigan intended, nevertheless brings some humanity to the part of the besotted Lord Nelson, even managing the hazardous "Kiss me, Hardy" with sufficient aplomb to minimise audience giggles. Any comment on Glenda Jackson's strident, anachronistic, inconsistent Lady Hamilton has been pre-empted by her own admission that 'it's the worst over-acting I've ever committed'."

Variety wrote: "The reason younger audiences may not exact as much entertainment value as elders from the film is that the pre-Victoria morality, which constitutes the unseen hut pervading antagonistic influence in the story, is of little concern to those youthful and most frequent filmgoers. A national hero, separated from his wife and living openly with a known and notorious swinger, today means instant fame and immediate entree into the allegedly best circles. Older generation will be much better attuned to the story vibrations and environment."

The New York Times found the film "thoroughly genteel", and wrote that Rattigan's dialogue was written "in the manner of someone regurgitating the cadences of a 19th-century schoolgirl's diary... Peter Finch plays Lord Nelson with a reserved passion that seems intelligently thought out but is not terribly interesting to watch, while Glenda Jackson seems to go at Lady Hamilton from the opposite direction."

Sky Cinema found the film "remarkable for the handsome Technicolor photography of Gerry Fisher and the brilliant production design of Carmen Dillon. There are some touching moments, notably those involving Margaret Leighton as Lady Nelson, and vivid climactic battle scenes. However, the two principals are not very well cast, and while Peter Finch struggles gamely to erase memories of Olivier's version of the role, Miss Jackson responds by stridently over-playing her hand as a sluttish Emma".

Time Out wrote, "Histrionics apart, you come out wondering whether it really matters."

Anne Cotes recalled the film "suffered from the most terrible miscasting ever, which was Glenda Jackson as Lady Hamilton, which was the most ludicrous thing ever... Because she knew she was going to get slammed, dunked by the critics, she came out and said she hated the film and she should never have done the part, and she hated the director and he didn’t know what he was doing. And that’s unforgivable, for me, to me." She felt "I don’t think it was a great script actually" and that Wallis "was very disappointed in Jimmy I think. I don’t know, he seemed to be out of his depth."

== Locations ==
Lansdown Crescent, Bath.
