= Michael Kozoll =

American producer and screenwriter

- Occupations: Producer, screenwriter

Michael Kozoll is an American producer and screenwriter. He is best known for co-creating the American police procedural television series Hill Street Blues along with Steven Bochco.

Kozoll wrote for numerous television hour-long dramatic programs in the 1970s, including Delvecchio, Quincy, M.E., McCloud, Kojak, Richie Brockelman, Private Eye and Kolchak: The Night Stalker. He then worked as a writer/producer/co-showrunner on Hill Street Blues for its first two seasons in 1981 and '82. For his work on the series, he won two Primetime Emmy Awards, and was nominated for two more, in the category Outstanding Writing for a Drama Series for his work on Hill Street Blues. As well, in 1981 he won an Emmy for Outstanding Drama Series, along with Bochco and Gregory Hoblit.

Kozoll left Hill Street Blues in 1982, as he was not in agreement with the direction the show was taking. His only film and television credits since are a co-screenplay credit on the initial "Rambo" film First Blood from 1982, which he co-wrote with William Sackheim and Sylvester Stallone, and a co-story credit on the 1991 Michael J. Fox vehicle The Hard Way.

== Selected filmography ==
- First Blood (1982)
- The Hard Way (1991)
