= Andrew Simpson (animal trainer) =

Animal trainer (born 1967)

- Born: 1967 (age 58–59); Fort William, Scotland
- Occupation: Animal trainer
- Years active: 1988-present

Andrew Simpson (born 1967) is a Scottish animal trainer who runs the company Instinct for Film with his American-born marital partner and fellow trainer Sally Jo Sousa. Simpson was born in Fort William in the Scottish Highlands. His parents worked for the aluminum maker Alcan, and he grew up with his family on the company estate in the Highlands. When he was 20 years old, he traveled to Australia and found work as an extra for the 1988 film A Cry in the Dark that starred Meryl Streep. Simpson worked with the film's dingo trainer for three weeks and continued working as an extra and as an animal training assistant. He eventually moved to Mission, British Columbia and worked for Creative Animal Talent. He moved to Calgary, Alberta in 1994 and currently lives there on a ranch with Sousa. Their company Instinct for Film has trained "birds, bears, leopards and small animals" for films and advertisements.

Simpson has trained animals over numerous television shows and over 150 films, including Final Destination (2000), Elf (2003), and Borat (2006). When Simpson and his company were hired to train wolves in Siberia for a French film called Loup (French for "Wolf"), the trainer decided to film the training process. Using the footage, he produced the documentary Wolves Unleashed, which screened at several film festivals. His biggest project to date was Wolf Totem (2015), for which he trained wolves. After he completed his work on Wolf Totem, he used footage from his three-year experience to begin producing a follow-up documentary, Wolves Unleashed: China.

In the 2010s, he also trained a wolf for the TV series Game of Thrones (the character Jon Snow's direwolf Ghost) and wolves for The Revenant.
