= Barbara Leigh-Hunt =

English actress (1935–2024)

- Born: 14 December 1935; Bath, Somerset, England
- Died: 16 September 2024 (aged 88); Aston Cantlow, Warwickshire, England
- Occupation: Actress
- Years active: 1954–2004
- Spouse: Richard Pasco (m. 1967; died 2014)
- Relatives: Ronald Leigh-Hunt (cousin)

Barbara Leigh-Hunt (14 December 1935 – 16 September 2024) was an English actress. Her numerous theatre credits included Broadway productions of Hamlet (1958), Sherlock Holmes (1973) and Justice (1974), and she won the 1993 Olivier Award for Best Supporting Actress for the National Theatre production of An Inspector Calls. Her film appearances included Frenzy (1972), Henry VIII and His Six Wives (1972), Bequest to the Nation (1973), and Billy Elliot (2000).

== Career ==
On stage, Leigh-Hunt appeared in many productions as well those with the Bristol Old Vic, the Royal Shakespeare Company and the Royal National Theatre. Her early film roles included Catherine Parr in Henry VIII and His Six Wives (1972), Bequest to the Nation (1973) and Oh Heavenly Dog (1980). Her most famous movie role was probably in Alfred Hitchcock's penultimate film Frenzy (1972), as a woman raped and strangled by a serial killer, that included the first graphically violent scene featuring visible nudity of Hitchcock's career.

In 1983, Leigh-Hunt appeared as the Queen of Bavaria in the mini-series Wagner, sharing her scenes with Ralph Richardson, Laurence Olivier and John Gielgud as court ministers. Richard Burton played the composer Richard Wagner. Her husband, Richard Pasco, whom she married in 1967, appeared also.

Leigh-Hunt played Jean Lawrence in the controversial BBC drama Tumbledown (1988), and Lady Catherine de Bourgh in Pride and Prejudice (1995), and provided the voices of the farmer's wife in The Plague Dogs (1982), and Captain Mildred and Mary the Hover Fairy in the 1987 Children's BBC series Charlie Chalk. In 1999, Leigh-Hunt starred as Lady Cumnor in BBC's four-part series adaptation of the novel Wives and Daughters (1999). More recently she appeared in such films as Paper Mask (1990), Keep the Aspidistra Flying (1997), Billy Elliot (2000), The Martins (2001) and Vanity Fair (2004), and had much work on television, mainly in guest character parts.

== Personal life and death ==
Leigh-Hunt's cousin was the actor Ronald Leigh-Hunt.

Leigh-Hunt was married to Richard Pasco from 1967 until his death in 2014. She died in Aston Cantlow, Warwickshire, on 16 September 2024, aged 88.

== Filmography ==
Year	Title	Role	Notes
1969	Callan	Susanne	Season 2, episode: "Death of a Hunter"
1969	Special Branch	Mira Kobylnova	S1 Ep11: "Exit a Diplomat"
1972	Frenzy	Brenda Blaney	
1972	Henry VIII and His Six Wives	Catherine Parr	
1973	Bequest to the Nation	Catherine 'Catty' Matcham	
1974	Who Killed Lamb?	Madeleine	Television film
1980	Oh Heavenly Dog	Margaret	
1982	The Plague Dogs	Farmer's Wife	Voice only
1986	Charlie Chalk (1987)	Captain Mildred, Mary the Hover Fairy	Voice only; 12 episodes
1986	Screenplay	Mrs Oxney	
1988	Tumbledown	Jean Lawrence	Television film
1990	Paper Mask	Celia Mumford	
1990	The Ruth Rendell Mysteries	Mrs Fanshawe	Episodes: "The Best Man to Die Parts 1,2,3"
1990	Inspector Morse	Blanche Copley-Barnes	Episode: "The Infernal Serpent"
1993	Anna Lee: Headcase	Beryl	Television film
1995	Pride and Prejudice	Lady Catherine de Bourgh	
1995	As Time Goes By	Registrar	Episode: "Wedding Day Nerves"
1997	Keep the Aspidistra Flying	Mrs. Wisbeach	
1998	The Echo	Mrs Deacon	Series 1 episode 2
1999	Wives and Daughters	Lady Cumnor	3 episodes
1999	Sunburn	Edna Hand	Series 1 episode 1
1999–2001	Kavanagh QC	Lady Justice Pinnock	2 episodes
2000	Billy Elliot	Vice-Principal	
2000	Longitude	Dodo Gould	Television film
2001	The Martins	Mrs. Heath	
2002	Midsomer Murders	Marjorie Empson	
2002	George Eliot: A Scandalous Life	Gossip	Television film
2002	Bertie and Elizabeth	Lady Mabel Airlie	
2004	Vanity Fair	Lady Bareacres	
