= National Committee of the Chinese Banking Workers' Union =

- National Committee of the Chinese Banking Workers' Union

The National Committee of the Chinese Banking Workers' Union is a national industrial union of the All-China Federation of Trade Unions in the People's Republic of China.
