= Workers' Daily =

Simplified Chinese newspaper

Workers' Daily (Chinese: 工人日报) is a Mandarin language newspaper nationwide in China and an official publication of the All-China Federation of Trade Unions.

The newspaper has been published since 1946, reporting economic news in China.
