= Ankhnyam Ragchaa =

Mongolian actress

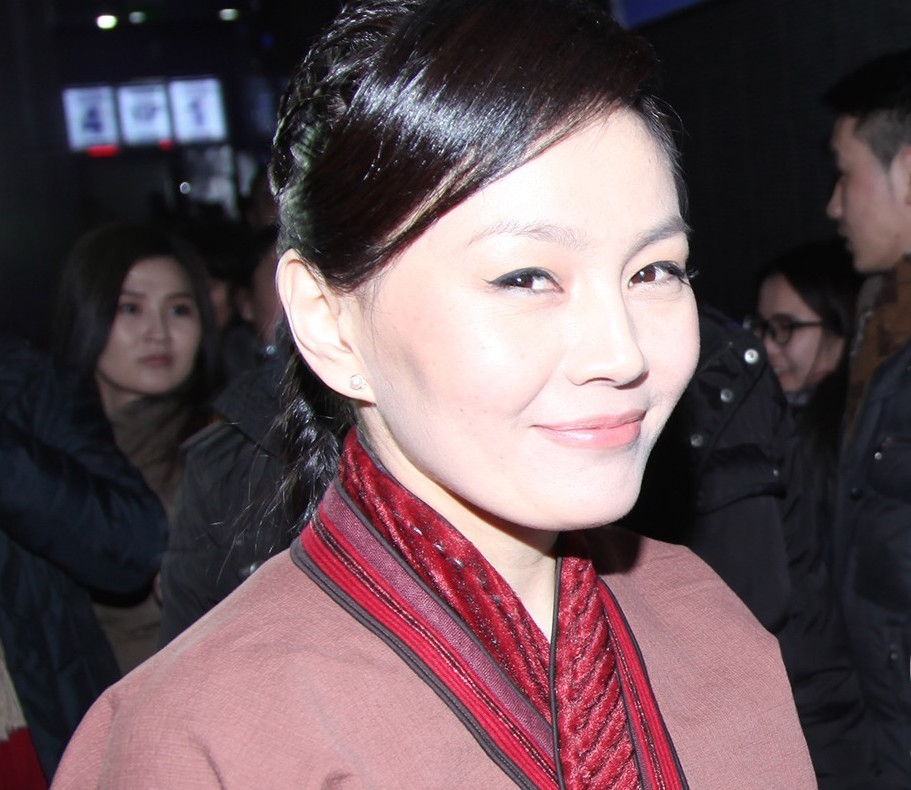
Anhnyam at Wolf Totem premiere

Ankhnyam Ragchaa (born in 1981), or Ragchaagyin Ankhnyam (Mongolian: Рагчаагийн Анхням; ᠠᠨᠺᠬᠨᠶᠠᠮ) is a Mongolian actress. She became internationally well known for her role as Gasma in the 2015 Chinese drama Wolf Totem, directed by French director Jean-Jacques Annaud. She was awarded the Cultural Worker by the Government of Mongolia in 2012.

== Filmography ==
Film

Year Title Role Director

1999 Feeling Senses/ Совингийн Савдаг/ Sovingyn Savdag Suren N. Chingis, Mongolia

2000 Don't Tell Anyone/ Хүнд битгий хэлээрэй /Khund Bitgy Kheleerei Sarnai N. Chingis, Mongolia

2000 Unknown Girl's letter/ Танихгүй охины захидал /Tanihgui Ohiny Zahidal Aagy R.Altansukh, Mongolia

2001 Winter Sonata/ Өвлийн уянга /Uvliin Uyanga Bolor B.Tumen-Ulzii, Mongolia

2002 Wind Khan/ Салхины хаан /Salkhiny Khaan Burte Mario Sonat, Mongolia

2003 Siilenbuur/ Сийлэнбөөр Secretary O.Mashbat, Mongolia

2003 Mountain Iron/ Уулын төмөр /Uulyn Tumur Tsermaa O.Bat-Ulzii, Mongolia

2004 Forgive/ Уучил/ Uuchil Undrakh B.Tsogtbayar, Mongolia

2005 Genghis Khan/ Чингис хаан/ Chingis Khan Burte BBC, UK & Mongolia

2005 Last Cuckoo's Song/ Сүүлчийн хөхөөн дуу/ Suulchyn Khukhuun Duu Tsermaa N.Khishigbadrakh, Mongolia

2006 Order/ Тушаал/ Tushaal Khulan P.Delgerbayar, Mongolia

2006 Kiss/ Үнсэлт/ Unselt Sisi B.Badamragchaa, Mongolia

2007 Marry Me/ Надтай гэрлээч/ Nadtai Gerleech Witch S.Battulga, Mongolia

2007 Two Nights and Three Days/ Хоёр шөнө, гурван өдөр/ Khoyor Shunu, Gurvan Udur Saraa B.Amarsaikhan, Mongola

2008 Sky Wind/ Тэнгэрийн салхи/ Tengeryn Salkhi Saran Chen Li Ming, China

2009 Saddle with Spiral Pattern/ Угалз хээт эмээл/ Ugalz Kheet Emeel Gua Song Tao, China

2009 Gaadaa Meeren/ Гаадаа Мээрэн Mandarvaa Chen Jia Lin, China

2010 Sex Freedom/ Сэксийн эрх чөлөө/ Seksyn Erkh Chuluu Enerel J.Jam’yansuren, Mongolia

2011 Police Oath/ Цагдаагийн тангараг/ Tsagdaagyn Tangarag Major Oyun-Gerel B.Badamragchaa, Mongolia

2013 Dagula/ Дагула King's Queen E Bu Si, China

2014 Wolf Totem/ Чонон сүлд Galsmaa Jean-Jacques Annaud, China

2016 The Remnant Boss Karmia Alutade, China

2016 When Love Returned in Spring/ Хайр эргэсэн хавар/ Khair Ergesen Khavar Selenge Ts. Ganseree, Mongolia

2016 Genghis’ Children/Чингисийн хүүхдүүд/ Chingisyn Khuukhduud Tsetseg D.Zolbayar, Mongolia

2017 World with Cloud Patterns/ Үүлэн хээтэй орчлон/ Uulen Kheetei Orchlon Sugar G.Badamragchaa, Mongolia

Television

2003 Dream Ship/ Мөрөөдлийн хөлөг онгоц/ Muruudlyn Khulug Ongots. Drama Khaliun J.Sengedorj, Mongolia

2010 Finding Love/ Хайрын эрэлд/ Khairyn Ereld. Drama Margad Ts.Ganseree, Mongolia
