= Paper Mask =

- Directed by: Christopher Morahan
- Written by: John Collee
- Produced by: Christopher Morahan
- Starring: Paul McGann; Amanda Donohoe; Frederick Treves; Tom Wilkinson; Jimmy Yuill; Barbara Leigh-Hunt
- Cinematography: Nat Crosby
- Edited by: Peter Coulson
- Music by: Richard Harvey
- Release date: September 14, 1990
- Running time: 105 minutes
- Country: United Kingdom
- Language: English
- Box office: £151,869 (UK)

Paper Mask is a 1990 British drama film directed by Christopher Morahan and starring Paul McGann, Amanda Donohoe and Tom Wilkinson. The screenplay concerns a hospital porter who decides to impersonate a doctor in a busy hospital. The film was based on a 1987 novel by John Collee, who also wrote the screenplay.

== Plot ==
Mathew Harris is a porter in a busy hospital in London. While playing his banjo in his bedroom, he dreams of job opportunities, having previously dropped out from studying biology. One evening, he witnesses a car accident outside a local pub, where the driver of a car is killed in a collision with a lorry. Harris knows the man, Simon Hennessey, a doctor at his hospital and discovers he had been applying for a residency at another hospital in Bristol. Harris takes the dead man's mail, completes a job application, and applies for the job himself under the late doctor's identity. After studying medical books and assisting and observing procedures at his hospital, Harris is accepted. Before leaving, he goes to the swimming pool where his friend Moran is. Explaining he is travelling abroad, he gives Moran his silver cigarette case. He quits his job and settles in Bristol where he, as Dr. Simon Hennessey, is assigned to a busy Accident & Emergency (A&E) department.

Despite his inexperience, Harris completes his first few days without major incident, but is reprimanded by his superior regarding his poor patient record keeping. He meets and is aided by a friendly nurse, Christine Taylor. She soon becomes smitten with Harris, helping him through his busy first days. After saving the life of a woman patient, Harris becomes more competent and confident, but he is arrogant and corrupted by his newly acquired power and skill. Soon, Taylor and Harris begin an affair, which complicates their work relationship. When a patient, the wife of the chief medic, dies under Harris' care, he is charged with negligence. At his hearing, Taylor takes the blame, which prompts her to resign.

One day, Harris unexpectedly meets Moran, who has moved from London to study to be a nurse. When Harris takes Moran to a remote area and admits his impersonation, asking Moran to keep his secret and leave the area, a shocked Moran threatens to report him. Harris follows Moran and pushes him off a cliff. However, Moran is critically injured rather than killed and survives long enough to be brought to the hospital for treatment. When trying to identify Moran, a nurse finds the silver cigarette case, which has Harris's name engraved inside, and assumes that it is him. Harris tries again to kill Moran in A&E, and succeeds by injecting a blood bag for Moran's emergency surgery with 20% potassium chloride.

Meanwhile, Taylor finally figures out Harris' charade, after seeing the real Dr. Simon Hennessey's gravestone in London, while visiting her recently deceased father's grave. She confronts Harris, who convinces her to identify Moran as Harris, so he can be legally declared dead and continue his impersonation.

Facing growing criticism, Harris transfers to another hospital in nearby Salisbury. He has however also agreed with Taylor to stop impersonating a doctor and move to London with her. However, rather than travel to London and Taylor, he heads for Salisbury. In the final scene, while Taylor hesitates over whether to report Harris' charade (which will also reveal her dishonest misidentification of Moran), Harris continues his charade at his new hospital.

== Cast ==
- Paul McGann ... Matthew Harris
- Amanda Donohoe ... Christine Taylor
- Frederick Treves ... Dr. Mumford
- Tom Wilkinson ... Dr. Thorn
- Barbara Leigh-Hunt ... Celia Mumford
- Jimmy Yuill ... Alec Moran
- Mark Lewis Jones ... Dr. Lloyd
- John Warnaby ... Dr. Hammond
- Alexandra Mathie ... Beverley
- Oliver Ford Davies ... Coroner
- Frank Baker ... Happy
- Clive Rowe ... Ants
- Robert Oates ... Head Porter
- Karen Ascoe ... Alison
- Dale Rapley ... Dr. Simon Hennessey
- Simon Adams ... Laurence
- Hetta Charnley ... Medical Student
- Steve Waller ... Pianist

== Release ==
The film was screened at the 1990 Directors' Fortnight (Quinzaine des Réalizateurs) at Cannes Film Festival.

The film grossed £23,893 in its opening week from four screens in London. It made £151,869 at the UK box office.
