= National Committee of the Chinese Educational, Scientific, Cultural, Medical and Sports Workers' Union =

- 中国教科文卫体工会
- Headquarters: Beijing
- Key people: Gao jie
- Website: jkwwt.acftu.org

The National Committee of the Chinese Educational, Scientific, Cultural, Medical and Sports Workers' Union is a national industrial union of the All-China Federation of Trade Unions in the People's Republic of China.
