= Delvecchio (TV series) =

American dramatic TV series

- Created by: Joseph Polizzi; Sam Rolfe
- Starring: Judd Hirsch
- Composer: Billy Goldenberg
- Country of origin: United States
- Original language: English
- No. of seasons: 1
- No. of episodes: 21 (2 unaired)

Production
- Executive producer: William Sackheim
- Running time: 60 minutes
- Production companies: Crescendo Productions; Universal Television

Original release
- Network: CBS
- Release: September 9, 1976 – March 13, 1977

Delvecchio is an American drama television series that aired Sundays at 10:00 pm (EST) on CBS from September 9, 1976, to March 13, 1977. It starred Judd Hirsch as the title character, Dominick Delvecchio, an Italian-American detective who worked for the LAPD and also studied to become a lawyer.

== Premise ==
The title character, a "tough, independent big-city police detective", had graduated from law school but failed the bar examination. His father, a barber, could not understand why Delvecchio chose a career that had him investigating crimes that included auto thefts, murders, and narcotics.

== Cast ==
- Judd Hirsch as Sgt. Dominick "Del Wop" Delvecchio
- Charles Haid as Sgt. Paul "The Fat Polish Sausage" Shonski
- Michael Conrad as Lt. Macavan
- Mario Gallo as Tomaso Delvecchio

=== Recurring ===
- Pervis Atkins as Robbie
- Jay Varela as Sgt. Rivera
- Lew Palter as Det. Clark
- George Wyner as Asst. D.A. Dorfman
- James B. Sikking as Ned Wangler
- James Jeter as Smitty

== Schedule ==
Delvecchio debuted on September 9, 1976, at 9 p.m. Its competition was The Streets of San Francisco on ABC and films on NBC. When it moved to 10 p.m. on September 26, 1976, films formed the competition on both networks. The change in time and date was planned by Bud Grant, vice president for programming at CBS to "whet people's appetites" by launching the show when the competing programming was weaker.

== Production ==
Steven Bochco was a writer/producer on the show, and Michael Kozoll was also a series writer. Four years after Delvecchio was cancelled, Boccho and Kozoll created the police drama Hill Street Blues, which featured (amongst many others) Delvecchio regulars Charles Haid, Michael Conrad, and James B. Sikking.

Other writers on the show included Peter S. Fischer, Gy Waldron, and John D. F. Black. William Sackheim was the executive producer, and Steven Bochco and Michael Rhodes were the producers. Directors were Lou Antonio, Walter Doniger, and Ivan Nagy. The series was filmed on location in Los Angeles.

== Episodes ==
No.	Title	Directed by	Written by	Original release date
1	"The Avenger"	Jerry London	Joseph Polizzi	September 26, 1976
Delvecchio finds the tough narcotics cop investigating an informer's murder with him unethical. With Sid Haig, René Auberjonois, John Durren, Frank Christi, Chris Barnes, Don Calfa, Jack Collins.
2	"Contract for Harry"	Walter Doniger	Joseph Polizzi	October 3, 1976
A police informant begs Delvecchio (Judd Hirsch) to help him escape the underworld. With Richard Yniguez, Hector Elias, Pepe Serna, Christine Avila, Rodolfo Hoyos, Isaac Ruiz, Julio Medina.
3	"Good Cop"	Richard Michaels	Peter S. Fischer	October 10, 1976
Delvecchio (Judd Hirsch) blames himself when his temporary partner is wounded while going after a murder suspect. With Warren Kemmerling, Stacy Keach Sr., Will Hare, Anthony Ponzini, Frank Maxwell, George Loros.
4	"Board of Rights"	Robert Markowitz	Gregory K. Scott	October 17, 1976
A stakeout assignment hampers Delvecchio (Judd Hirsch) in his defense of an officer charged with making obscene phone calls. With James J. Sloyan, Henry Brown, Tony Burton, Bruce Kirby Jr., George Memmoli.
5	"Wax Job"	Richard Michaels	Story by : Bernard Rollins & Leroy Robinson; Teleplay by : Steven Bochco	October 24, 1976
A clever auto thief blunders when he kills an owner during a theft. With Herbert Jefferson Jr., Phylicia Ayers-Allen, Marla Adams, Michael Mann, Carmen Argenziano, Philip Bruns.
6	"The Silent Prey"	Lou Antonio	Story by : Nicholas E. Baehr; Teleplay by : Nicholas E. Baehr & Steven Bochco	October 31, 1976
A housewife traumatized by a rape attempt appears unable or unwilling to identify her attacker. With Ellen Geer, Alan Fudge, Titos Vandis, Michael Richardson, Anne Ramsey.
7	"Thicker Than Water"	John Peyser	Story by : William Sackheim & Michael Rhodes & Steven Bochco; Teleplay by : Steven Bochco	November 7, 1976
Delvecchio's search for a loan shark whose bodyguards killed a gambler is complicated by the victim's revenge-seeking brother. With Vincent Baggetta, Alex Rocco, Dori Brenner, Jan Peters, James Jeter, Gloria Manon, Walter Mathews.
8	"Hot Spell"	Arnold Laven	Michael Kozoll	November 14, 1976
Delvecchio (Judd Hirsch) investigates a suspicious death despite the authorities' belief that it was accidental. With Philip Abbott, Philip Sterling, George Gaynes, Charles Napier, Marian Collier.
9	"Numbers"	Richard Michaels	Leo Garen	December 5, 1976
Suspected of being on the take after his raid on a numbers bank fails, Del (Judd Hirsch) is after the racketeer who can clear his name. With James Wainwright, Roger E. Mosley, Allan Rich, Christopher Joy, Alan Haufrect, Pat Corley.
10	"Red is the Color of My True Love's Hair"	Walter Doniger	Story by : Gy Waldron; Teleplay by : Steven Bochco & Michael Kozoll & Gy Waldron	December 12, 1976
Delvecchio (Judd Hirsch) has conflicting evidence about a truck driver suspected of a series of murders. With Kiel Martin, Cassie Yates, Sean Fallon Walsh, Jack Bannon, Melodie Johnson.
11	"APB: Santa Claus"	Arnold Laven	Steven Pritzker	December 26, 1976
Delvecchio (Judd Hirsch) trails a bail-jumping Santa Claus, arrested for stealing presents to give to his fellow residents in a rest home. With David Wayne, George Pentecost.
12	"Dying Can Be a Pleasure"	Walter Doniger	Story by : William Sackheim; Teleplay by : Steven Bochco	January 23, 1977
Harassed by a paroled murderer, Delvecchio (Judd Hirsch) takes action that may discredit him as a witness in an important case. With Mariette Hartley, Terry Kiser, Robert Mandan, Howard Hesseman, Marjorie Battles.
13	"One Little Indian"	Robert Markowitz	Steven Bochco	January 30, 1977
In Arizona to pick up an Indian youth who escaped from prison, Delvecchio (Judd Hirsch) and Shonski (Charles Haid) lock horns with a brutal, bigoted cop. With Erik Estrada, Maureen McCormick, Bill Lucking, White Eagle.
14	"Bad Shoot"	Ivan Dixon	Michael Kozoll	February 6, 1977
A bigoted detective is a suspect in the cold-blooded shooting of a black student. With John Harkins, Jacques Aubuchon, Jason Bernard, Stanley Adams, Carl Weathers, Lawrence Cook.
15	"Licensed to Kill"	Arnold Laven	Story by : William Sackheim & John D.F. Black; Teleplay by : Lane Slate & Michael Kozoll	February 13, 1977
Delvecchio attempts to prove that responsibility for his goddaughter's suicide lies with a medical charlatan who led her to believe that she had cancer. With John Hillerman, Barney McFadden, Reni Santoni, John Marley, Nick Ferris, Milt Kogan.
16	"The Madness Within: Part 1"	Richard Michaels	Story by : William Sackheim & Steven Bochco & Michael Rhodes; Teleplay by : Steven Bochco	February 20, 1977
Delvecchio (Judd Hirsch) is asked by an old flame (Tricia O'Neil) for protection the state prosecutor cannot guarantee for her testimony against a syndicate kingpin. First of two parts. With Ned Beatty, Anthony Caruso, Booth Colman, Maurice Hill, James Sikking, George E. Carey.
17	"The Madness Within: Part 2"	Richard Michaels	Story by : William Sackheim & Steven Bochco & Michael Rhodes; Teleplay by : Steven Bochco	February 27, 1977
Conclusion. The witness who Delvecchio (Judd Hirsch) illegally removed from protective custody disappears, sparking a search by people on both sides of the law. With Tricia O'Neil, Ned Beatty, Anthony Caruso, Booth Colman, Maurice Hill, James Sikking, George E. Carey.
18	"Requiem for a Loser"	Ivan Nagy	Story by : Lou Comici & Burton Armus; Teleplay by : Burton Armus & Michael Kozoll	March 6, 1977
A church is burglarized and a priest murdered after a parishioner in debt to a hood reveals the location of fund-raising proceeds. With Michael Callan, Mel Berger, Ric Mancini, Joshua Shelley.
19	"Cancelled Contract"	Arnold Laven	Story by : Elliot West; Teleplay by : Elliot West & Michael Kozoll	March 13, 1977
A former leader of a street-gang reassembles his old crew to battle a syndicate lieutenant. With Ed Harris, Michael Witney, John Milford, Richard Bright.
20	"My Brother's Keeper"	N/A	N/A	Unaired
TBD.
21	"The High Price of Justice"	Jerry London	Story by : Sam Rolfe and Joseph Polizzi; Teleplay by : Sam Rolfe	Unaired
Using the threat of reimprisonment, Delvecchio persuades a parolee to inform on his old gang.

== Home media ==
One episode of the Delvecchio series (the Feb. 13, 1977 installment, "Licensed to Kill") was made available on the 2006 DVD release Brilliant But Cancelled TV Dramas, along with an episode each of Gideon Oliver, Johnny Staccato, and Touching Evil.
