= All-China Federation of Trade Unions =

China's national trade union center

- 中华全国总工会
- Founded: 1 May 1925
- Type: People's organization; national trade union center
- Headquarters: Beijing, China
- Location: People's Republic of China
- Members: 302 million (2017); 280 million (2013); 250 million (2012); 193 million (2008); 134 million (2005)
- Key people: Wang Dongming, Chairman; Lu Zhiyuan, Party Secretary
- Publication: Workers' Daily
- Affiliations: WFTU; Profintern (historical)
- Website: www.acftu.org

All-China Federation of Trade Unions
- Simplified Chinese: 中华全国总工会
- Traditional Chinese: 中華全國總工會
Transcriptions
Standard Mandarin
- Hanyu Pinyin: Zhōnghuá Quánguó Zǒng Gōnghuì
- Wade–Giles: Chunghua Ch'üankuo Tsung Kunghoe

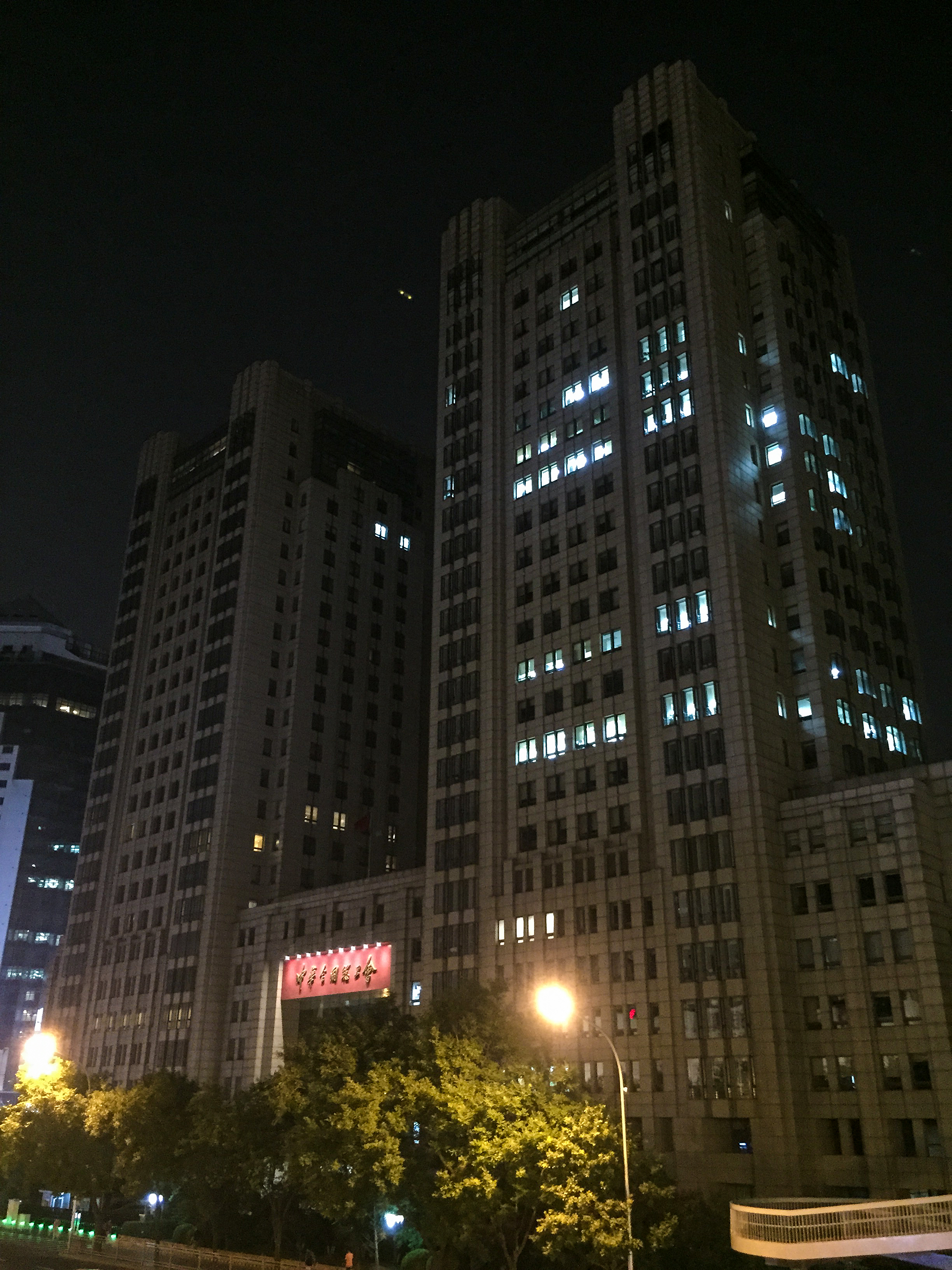
The ACFTU building in Beijing

The All-China Federation of Trade Unions (ACFTU) is the national trade union center and people's organization of the People's Republic of China, led by the Chinese Communist Party (CCP). It is the largest trade union in the world with 302 million members in 1,713,000 primary trade union organizations. The ACFTU is divided into 31 regional federations and 10 national industrial unions. The ACFTU is the country's sole legally mandated trade union, with which all enterprise-level trade unions must be affiliated. The ACFTU is managed by the CCP Secretariat. There has been dispute over whether ACFTU is an independent trade union or a trade union at all. The federation owns a higher education institution—the China University of Labor Relations.

== History ==
The Federation was founded on 1 May 1925 when the "Second National Labor Congress" of China convened in Guangdong with 277 delegates representing 540,000 workers, and adopted the Constitution of the All-China Federation of Trade Unions. Between 1922 and 1927, the organization flourished, as did the Chinese Communist Party's control over the trade union movement. The labor movement had grown enormously, particularly in the three industrial and commercial centers of Canton, Hong Kong, and Shanghai, but it also had some organizational success in other cities such as Wuhan. The ACFTU was restricted in 1927 by the newly established rule of the Nationalist regime under Chiang Kai-shek, who had ordered the execution of thousands of CCP cadres and their sympathizers as part of a crackdown on Communism. All Communist Party-led unions were banned and replaced with yellow unions loyal to him (e.g. the "Chinese Federation of Labor," which has since reformed into an independent union).

By the rise of the People's Republic in 1949, the ACFTU was established as China's sole national labor union center, but was again dissolved in 1966 in the wake of the Cultural Revolution in favor of revolutionary committees. Following Mao's death in 1976, in October 1978 the ACFTU held its first congress since 1957. Since the early 1990s it has been regulated by the Trade Union Law of the People's Republic of China.

In 1954, the ACFTU began a nationwide technological innovation movement. Emphasizing workers' contributions to technology, it called for learning from the Soviet scientific experience while "giving full play to the talents and wisdom of the laboring masses."

The ACFTU had the major role in advancing the Labor Contract Law, which came into effect in 2008. The ACFTU drafted the law and proposed it to the National People's Congress.

According to a 2011 study during the period of rapid economic growth in China the ACFTU has prioritized the interests of business over the interests of labor and has lost legitimacy in the eyes of many laborers.

In 2018, the 17th National Congress of the All-China Federation of Trade Unions was held at the Great Hall of the People in Beijing. At the congress Union leadership faced pressure to stop acting as a bridge or mediator between workers and management and start acting as a genuine voice of the workers. This pressure arose both internally and was also applied by the CCP.

In 2018, the ACFTU identified platform economy food delivery drivers among its eight priority groups of workers for protection. It increased its skills training, legal assistance, and provided some medical benefits for these workers.

== Organization and purpose ==
As of early 2024, the ACFTU has 300 million members and one million officials, making it the world's largest union.

According to its constitution, the ACFTU is led by the Chinese Communist Party (CCP). Specifically, it is managed by the Secretariat of the CCP Central Committee. The CCP controls the appointment of ACFTU officials at the regional and national levels. ACFTU employees are public servants who must pass the examinations required of public servants. Enterprise-level unions within the ACFTU are generally established by local union officials in consultation with enterprise management.

The ACFTU's stated purpose is to advocate for workers' interests within the CCP and the government, address occupational health and safety issues, and conduct industrial policy oversight.

== Relation to the state ==
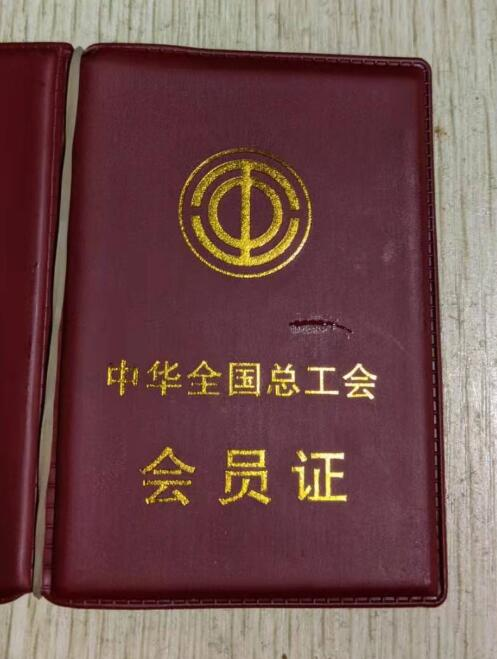
ACFTU membership card

Some academics and outside organizations have questioned whether the ACFTU qualifies as an independent trade union given its relation to the CCP and state. The International Confederation of Free Trade Unions (now the International Trade Union Confederation) claims that the ACFTU is not an independent union, stating in its policy:

There are differing approaches among ICFTU affiliates and Global Union Federations concerning contacts with the ACFTU ranging from "no contacts" to "constructive dialog." The ICFTU, noting that the ACFTU is not an independent trade union organization and, therefore, cannot be regarded as an authentic voice of Chinese workers, reaffirms its request to all affiliates and Global Union Federations having contacts with the Chinese authorities, including the ACFTU, to engage in critical dialog. This includes raising violations of fundamental workers' and trade union rights in any such meetings, especially concerning cases of detention of trade union and labor rights activists.

== Publications ==
The ACFTU publishes various journals, magazines, and other media, including Worker's Daily.

== Other labor activism in China ==
The ACFTU is China's only legal trade union.

The independent Beijing Workers' Autonomous Federation formed during the 1989 Tiananmen Square protests. Martial Law Command Headquarters issued a public notice declaring the BWAF an illegal organization and ordering it to disband on the grounds that Federation leaders were among "the main instigators and organizers in the capital of the counterrevolutionary rebellion."

Since the 1990s, grassroots non-government organizations focused on labor advocacy have increased. As a result of their precarious legal position, they rarely engage in overt labor resistance.

The failure of the ACFTU to advocate for workers has led to an increase in wildcat strikes and other unauthorized labor action.

== Member organizations ==
- All-China Federation of Railway Workers' Unions
- China University of Labor Relations
- National Committee of the Chinese Agricultural, Forestry and Water Conservancy Workers' Union
- National Committee of the Chinese Aviation Workers' Union
- National Committee of the Chinese Banking Workers' Union
- National Committee of the Chinese Defense Industry, Postal and Telecommunications Workers' Union
- National Committee of the Chinese Educational, Scientific, Cultural, Medical and Sports Workers' Union
- National Committee of the Chinese Energy and Chemical Workers' Union
- National Committee of the Chinese Financial, Commercial, Light Industry, Textile and Tobacco Workers' Union
- National Committee of the Chinese Machinery, Metallurgical and Building Material Workers' Union
- National Committee of the Chinese Seamen and Construction Workers' Union

== Regional affiliates ==
- Hong Kong Federation of Trade Unions
- Macau Federation of Trade Unions

== List of chairmen ==
Note: Until 1987, Wade-Giles was the standard romanized system for Chinese even pinyin was introduced in 1958. Current pinyin names are included in parentheses.

- 1st (May 1922 – May 1925)
  - Teng Chung-hsia (Deng Zhongxia)
- 2nd (May 1925 – May 1926)
  - Lin Wêi-min (Lin Weimin) (ACFTU officially formed)
- 3rd (May 1926 – June 1927)
  - Su Chao-chêng (Su Zhaozheng)
- 4th (June 1927 – November 1929)
  - Su Chao-cheng (Su Zhaozheng)
- 5th (November 1929 – August 1948)
  - Hsiang Ying (Xiang Ying)
- 6th (August 1948 – May 1953)
  - Liu Shao-chi (Liu Shaoqi) (honorary)
  - Ch'ên Yün (Chen Yun)
- 7th (May 1953 – December 1957)
  - Liu Shao-chi (Liu Shaoqi) (honorary)
  - Lai Jo-yu (Lai Ruoyu)
- 8th (December 1957 – December 1966)
  - Lai Jo-yu (Lai Ruoyu) (December 1957 – May 1958)
  - Liu Ning-yi (Liu Ningyi) (August 1958 – December 1966)
- 9th (October 1978 – October 1983)
  - Ni Chi-fu (Ni Zhifu)
- 10th (October 1983 – October 1988)
  - Ni Chi-fu (Ni Zhifu)
- 11th (October 1988 – October 1993)
  - Ni Zhifu
- 12th (October 1993 – October 1998)
  - Wei Jianxing
- 13th (October 1998 – October 2003)
  - Wei Jianxing (October 1998 – December 2002)
  - Wang Zhaoguo (December 2002 – October 2003)
- 14th (October 2003 – October 2008)
  - Wang Zhaoguo
- 15th (October 2008 – October 2013)
  - Wang Zhaoguo (− March 2013)
  - Li Jianguo (March 2013 – October 2013)
- 16th (October 2013 – October 2018)
  - Li Jianguo (− March 2018)
  - Wang Dongming (March 2018 – October 2018)
- 17th (October 2018 – October 2023)
  - Wang Dongming
- 18th (October 2023 – present)
  - Wang Dongming

== See also ==
- Labor Contract Law of China
- Ministry of Human Resources and Social Security of the People's Republic of China, previously the Ministry of Labor and Social Security
- China Labour Bulletin
- China Labor Watch
- All-China Women's Federation
- Communist Youth League of China
- Young Pioneers of China
- Chinese Peasants' Association
- China Institute of Industrial Relations
