= Wolf Totem =

2004 Chinese novel

- Cover of the first edition
- Author: Jiang Rong (pseudonym)
- Original title: 狼图腾
- Language: Chinese and has been translated into more than 30 languages
- Genre: Novel
- Publisher: Changjiang Literature and Arts Publishing House
- Publication date: April 2004
- Publication place: China
- Media type: Print (Paperback)
- ISBN: 7-5354-2730-8
- OCLC: 55622937
- LC Class: PL2942.3.A44 L36 2004

Wolf Totem (simplified Chinese: 狼图腾; traditional Chinese: 狼圖騰; pinyin: Láng Túténg) is a 2004 Chinese semi-autobiographical novel about the experiences of a young student from Beijing who finds himself sent to the countryside of Inner Mongolia in 1967, at the height of China's Cultural Revolution. The author, Lü Jiamin, wrote the book under the pseudonym Jiang Rong; his true identity did not become publicly known until several years after the book's publication.

== Themes ==
Wolf Totem is narrated by the main character, Chen Zhen, a Chinese man in his late twenties who, like the author, left his home in Beijing, China to work in Inner Mongolia during the Cultural Revolution. Through descriptions of folk traditions, rituals, and life on the steppe, Wolf Totem compares the culture of the ethnic Mongolian nomads and the Han Chinese farmers in the area. According to some interpretations, the book praises the "freedom, independence, respect, unyielding before hardship, teamwork and competition" of the former and criticizes the "Confucian-inspired culture" of the latter, which was "sheep-like". The book condemns the agricultural collectivisation imposed on the nomads by the settlers, and the ecological disasters it caused, and ends with a 60-page "call to action" disconnected from the main thread of the novel.

The author has said he was inspired to begin writing Wolf Totem by accident: he ignored the advice of the clan chief of the group of nomads with whom he was staying, and accidentally stumbled across a pack of wolves. Terrified, he watched as the wolves chased a herd of sheep off a cliff, then dragged their corpses into a cave. From then on, fascinated by the wolves, he began to study them and their relationship with the nomads more closely, and even attempted to domesticate one.

== Marketing ==
Wolf Totem exhibited strong sales almost immediately after its release, selling 50,000 copies in two weeks; pirated editions began to appear five days after the book first appeared on shelves. By March 2006, it had sold over four million copies in China, and had been broadcast in audiobook format in twelve parts during prime time on China Radio International. Jiang released a children's edition of the book in July 2005, cut down to roughly one-third the length.

Despite the author's refusal to participate in marketing the book, deals for adaptations of the novel into other media and translations into other languages have set financial records. Penguin Books paid US$100,000 for the worldwide English rights, setting a record for the highest amount paid for the translation rights to a Chinese book; an unspecified Tokyo publisher paid US$300,000 for the rights to publish a manga adaptation, and Bertelsmann bought the German-language rights for €20,000. The author has said that he believes that "in the West they may understand [my book] more fully" than in China.

Other writers took advantage of the author's anonymity to write fake sequels to Wolf Totem, including two books titled Wolf Totem 2, as well as Great Wolf of the Plains, all with the imprint of the Changjiang Arts Publishing House. As a result, in April 2007, the author issued a statement that denounced all such "sequels" as fraudulent; he indicated that he was doing research for another book, but would not be publishing anything new in the short term.

== Critical reaction ==
Despite Jiang's stated refusal to attend any awards ceremonies or participate in any publicity, Wolf Totem has received more than 10 literary prizes, as well as other recognitions, including:

- Named as one of the "Ten Best Chinese-language Books of 2004" by international newsweekly Yazhou Zhoukan
- Nominee for the 2nd "21st Century Ding Jun Semiannual Literary Prize" in 2005
- Recipient of the first Man Asian Literary Prize, November 2007

== Criticism ==
Wolf Totem has been criticized for its portrayal of Chinese national character, with some critics arguing that it presents Chinese society as having been “softened” by agricultural traditions and Confucianism. The novel also addresses ethnic policies in Inner Mongolia during the Cultural Revolution, and advances the idea that “the wolf is the totem of the Mongolian people,” associating Mongolians and other nomadic peoples with a so-called “wolf-like” national character. This interpretation has generated debate over whether the work reflects a form of reverse ethnic nationalism in its treatment of Han Chinese and ethnic minorities.Some commentators have expressed concern over what they describe as the novel’s implied hierarchy between nomadic and agricultural civilizations. Jiang Rong’s argument that Western civilization achieved historical strength due to a “wolf-like” spirit comparable to that of nomadic societies has been regarded by some scholars as an oversimplification. Literary critic Li Jingze stated that interpreting Chinese history and civilizational development through binary concepts such as “wolf nature” and “sheep nature” is analytically unsound, arguing that such frameworks primarily appeal to popular demand for simplified historical narratives rather than offering rigorous explanation.In an article published in Youth Reference, Daxiang Gonghui founder Huang Zhangjin argued that Mongol actions during the era of Genghis Khan were driven by historical conditions and survival imperatives rather than aesthetic or ideological motives, cautioning against retrospectively romanticizing periods of violence and conquest. Writing in the Journal of Changzhou Institute of Technology, Xu Hongmei contended that the narrative structure of the novel positions admiration toward the symbolic “wolf” above its Han counterparts, suggesting that the work implicitly portrays Han cultural characteristics as inferior to those associated with ethnic minorities. Kunlun Policy Studies affiliated researcher Shen Peng similarly criticized the novel for what he described as an uncritical valorization of “nomadic spirit” at the expense of traditional Han historical figures.

Charu Nivedita, in his review in The Asian Age, called the novel fascist. He wrote, "Won’t we all prefer a peaceful desert to a fascist grassland where one dominating race devours all other in a macabre ritual of bloodbath?" German sinologist Wolfgang Kubin described the book as "fascist" for its depiction and treatment of the farmers. Pankaj Mishra, reviewing the English translation for The New York Times, described Jiang's writing as "full of set-piece didacticism."

The Mongol writer Guo Xuebo (郭雪波), a scholar of Mongolian literature and history, has said that the wolf was never a traditional totem used by ethnic Mongolians; on the contrary, the wolf is the biggest menace to their survival. His post to this effect on Sina Weibo on 18 February 2015 was questioned by many others. On February 25, he wrote an open letter, condemning the novel and the film, saying they "humiliate the ancestry, distort the history and culture, and insult the Mongolian people." Independent from his views, the wolf is a revered animal, which is regarded as having a heavenly destiny in Mongolia. On 20 January 2016, the Inner Mongolia Academy of Social Sciences (内蒙古社会科学院), the leading academic and research institution in Inner Mongolia, said that there is no wolf totem in the beliefs of ethnic Mongolians. The institution found remains of ancient Mongolian totem worship in varying degrees among some tribes in ethnic Mongolia, but concluded there is no unified ethnic totem for Mongolian people after a wide range of fieldwork from April until July 2015 in Inner Mongolia. According to critic Ruth Y.Y. Hung, who reviewed the novel for the international journal boundary 2, the novel's use of wolves as an allegory connects various discourses that subvert literary demands and animal lives, thereby stripping these subjects of their distinct identities and material existence outside of human-centered culture and politics.

== English translations ==
- First edition: Jiang, Rong (April 2004), Lang tu teng 狼图腾 (in Chinese (China)), Wuchang, Hubei: Changjiang Arts Publishing House, ISBN 7-5354-2730-8
- Jiang, Rong (2008-03-27), Wolf Totem, translated by Goldblatt, Howard, Penguin, ISBN 978-1-59420-156-1

== Film adaptation ==
Wolf Totem is a 2015 Chinese-language film based on the novel. Directed by French director Jean-Jacques Annaud who co-wrote with Alain Godard and John Collee, the Chinese-French co-production features a Chinese student who is sent to Inner Mongolia to teach shepherds and instead learns about the wolf population, which is under threat by a government apparatchik.

The Beijing Forbidden City Film Corporation initially sought to hire a Chinese director, but filming humans with real wolves was considered too difficult. New Zealand director Peter Jackson was approached, but production did not take place. Annaud, whose 1997 film Seven Years in Tibet is banned in China, was hired despite the history. The film was produced by China Film Group and French-based Reperage. The French director, who had worked with animals on other films, acquired a dozen wolf pups in China and had them trained for several years by a Canadian animal trainer. With a production budget of US$40 million, Annaud filmed Wolf Totem in Inner Mongolia, where the book is set, for over a year.

The film premiered at the European Film Market on February 7, 2015. It was scheduled to be released in China on February 19, 2015, for the start of the Chinese New Year, and in France on February 25, 2015.

=== Animated film ===
In November 2015, Le Vision Pictures has entered into a two-picture deal with The Lion King director Rob Minkoff and producing partner Pietro Ventani to co-develop and produce the epic animated feature based on the novel.

== See also ==
- Zhang Chengzhi, a senior of Jiang's at the Chinese Academy of Social Sciences who was also sent down to Ujimqin Banner during the Cultural Revolution and rose to fame through his writings about Inner Mongolia
- Tengger, the Mongolian sky-god discussed in the novel
