= Jiang Rong =

Chinese writer

- Chinese: 姜戎
Transcriptions
Standard Mandarin
- Hanyu Pinyin: Jiāng Róng

Lü Jiamin
- Chinese: 呂嘉民
Transcriptions
Standard Mandarin
- Hanyu Pinyin: Lǚ Jiāmín

Lü Jiamin (born 1946 in Jiangsu), better known by his pseudonym Jiang Rong, is a Chinese writer, most famous for his best-selling 2004 novel Wolf Totem, which he wrote under the pseudonym Jiang Rong. He is married to fellow novelist Zhang Kangkang.

== Early life ==
Lü's parents both came from Jiading, a town outside of Shanghai. They both joined the Chinese Communist Party in Shanghai in the 1920s, and both his parents served in the army during the Second Sino-Japanese War, fighting against the Empire of Japan. After the war, his mother became involved in education, while his father rose to the position of bureau chief in the Ministry of Health. His mother died of cancer when he was just 11.

Lü first attracted negative attention from the authorities as early as 1964, while still a student; he was denounced as "counter-revolutionary" for an essay he had written. He went on to join Red Guards, even though his father had been targeted by those same Red Guards as a capitalist roader; however, when the Red Guards began confiscating books and participating in book burnings, Lü often secreted the books away, adding them to his own private collection. In 1967, as a 21-year-old high school graduate, Lü volunteered to go as a sent-down youth to East Ujimqin Banner in Xilin Gol League, Inner Mongolia, where he remained for eleven years, until the age of 33. By his own admission, he chose the remote location of Inner Mongolia rather than the more popular Heilongjiang in Northeastern China so that he could bring his books with him; he feared that if he went to Heilongjiang, he would have to live in army barracks, and might get his books confiscated.

== Writing Wolf Totem ==
Lü began thinking about and writing up the ideas behind Wolf Totem as early as 1971, while still in Inner Mongolia, but did not yet begin to write anything down. He returned to Beijing in 1978, where he participated in the Beijing Spring movement, becoming editor-in-chief of the eponymous literary journal Beijing Spring. A year later, he entered the Chinese Academy of Social Sciences. After his graduation, he became an associate professor at the China Labor College. He was arrested for his role in the Tiananmen Square protests of 1989, but was released in January 1991 without ever having been tried, along with Liu Suli, He Dong and Chen Po, as well as student leaders Xiong Yan and Zhou Suofen. He finally produced a complete first draft of Wolf Totem 1997, and only submitted the final draft to his publisher at the end of 2003. His hardest work on the novel was done in the final six years; his wife, herself a famous novelist, described how he "locked himself in his office every day and refused to tell me what he was doing".

Though Lü often agreed to give interviews to both domestic and foreign media, he refused to allow pictures of himself to be published. Until 2006, only five people even knew his true identity; he never revealed his real name to the media, though his identity became known to China's Ministry of Public Security. A number of other writers took advantage of Lü's anonymity to write fake sequels to Wolf Totem, including two books both entitled Wolf Totem 2, as well as the 250,000-character long Great Wolf of the Plains all with the imprint of the Changjiang Arts Publishing House. As a result, in April 2007, he issued a statement which denounced all such "sequels" as fraudulent; he indicated that he was doing research for another book, but would not be publishing anything new in the short term. His identity finally became widely known in November 2007, after he won the first Man Asian Literary Prize; a photograph he had submitted to the jury, along with his real name, were published by newspapers all over the world. However, he remained unable to obtain a passport, and thus could not leave mainland China to attend the awards ceremony.

== Political views ==
Lü describes himself as a "critical left-wing thinker", and remains a supporter of democracy and individualism; in a 2005 interview with British newspaper The Daily Telegraph, he expressed his belief that China risked becoming "like Nazi Germany" if it did not further democratise. He also indicated his admiration for Li Yuchun, a 2005 participant in the Chinese televised singing competition Super Girl whose idiosyncratic style and choice of songs gained her popularity and ultimately led her to win first prize in the contest; he described her as a "good symbol for Chinese society". Authors he names as having influenced his work include Balzac, Tolstoy, Jack London, and Jane Austen.

== Works ==
- Wolf Totem. Translated by Howard Goldblatt. New York: Penguin. 2008. ISBN 978-1-59420-156-1. - Won the inaugural Man Asian Literary Prize in November 2007.
