= 2019 deaths in the United States (July–December) =

- Decades: 1990s; 2000s; 2010s; 2020s; 2030s
- See also: History of the United States (2016–present); Timeline of United States history (2010–present); List of years in the United States

Deaths in the last half of the year 2019 in the United States. For the first half of the year, see 2019 deaths in the United States, January–June.

== July ==
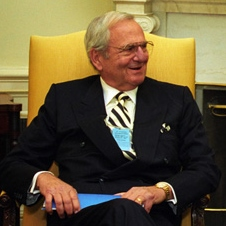
Lee Iacocca

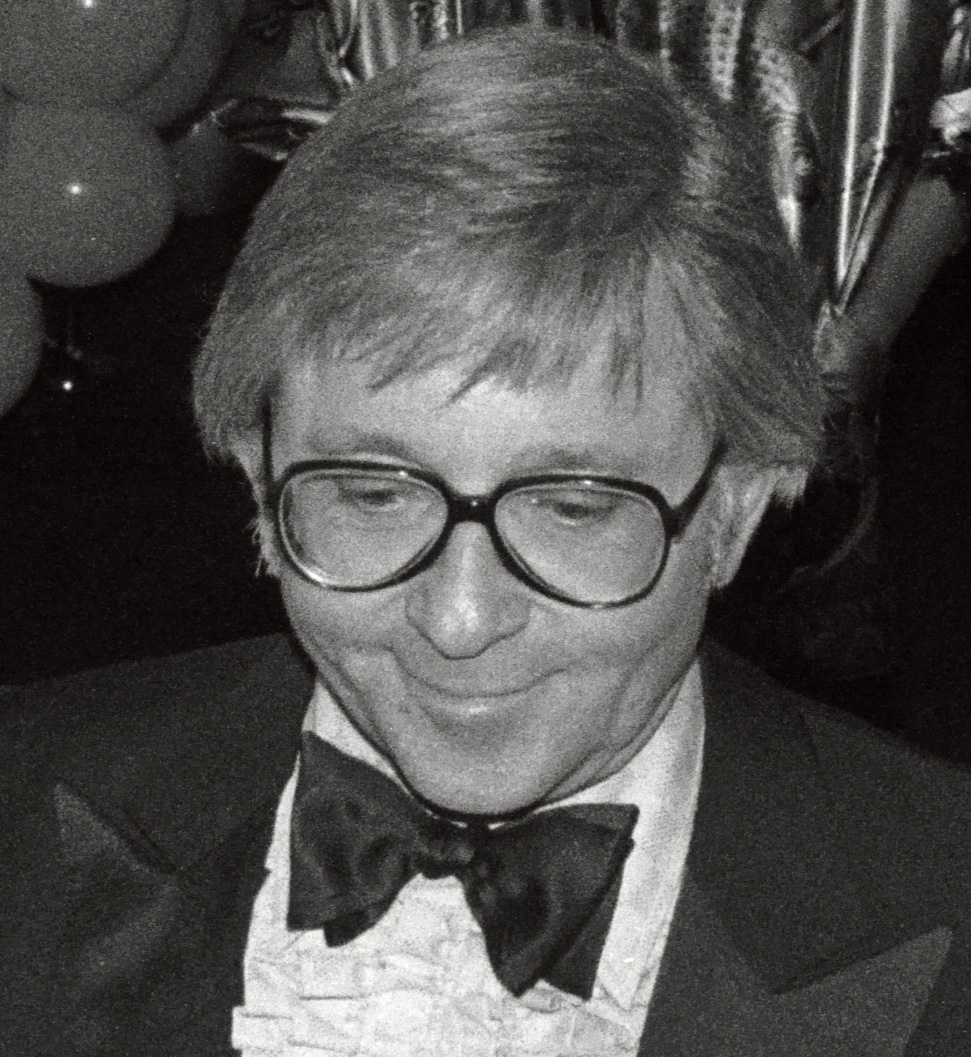
Arte Johnson

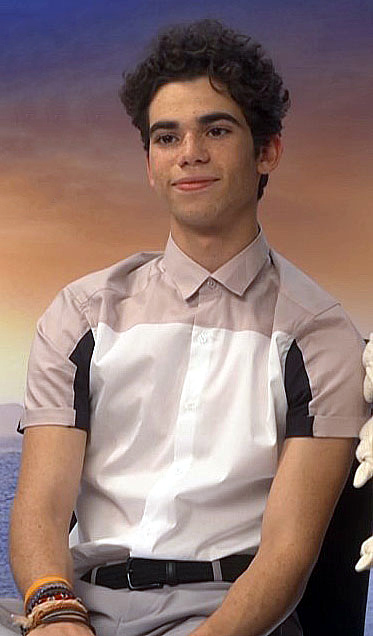
Cameron Boyce

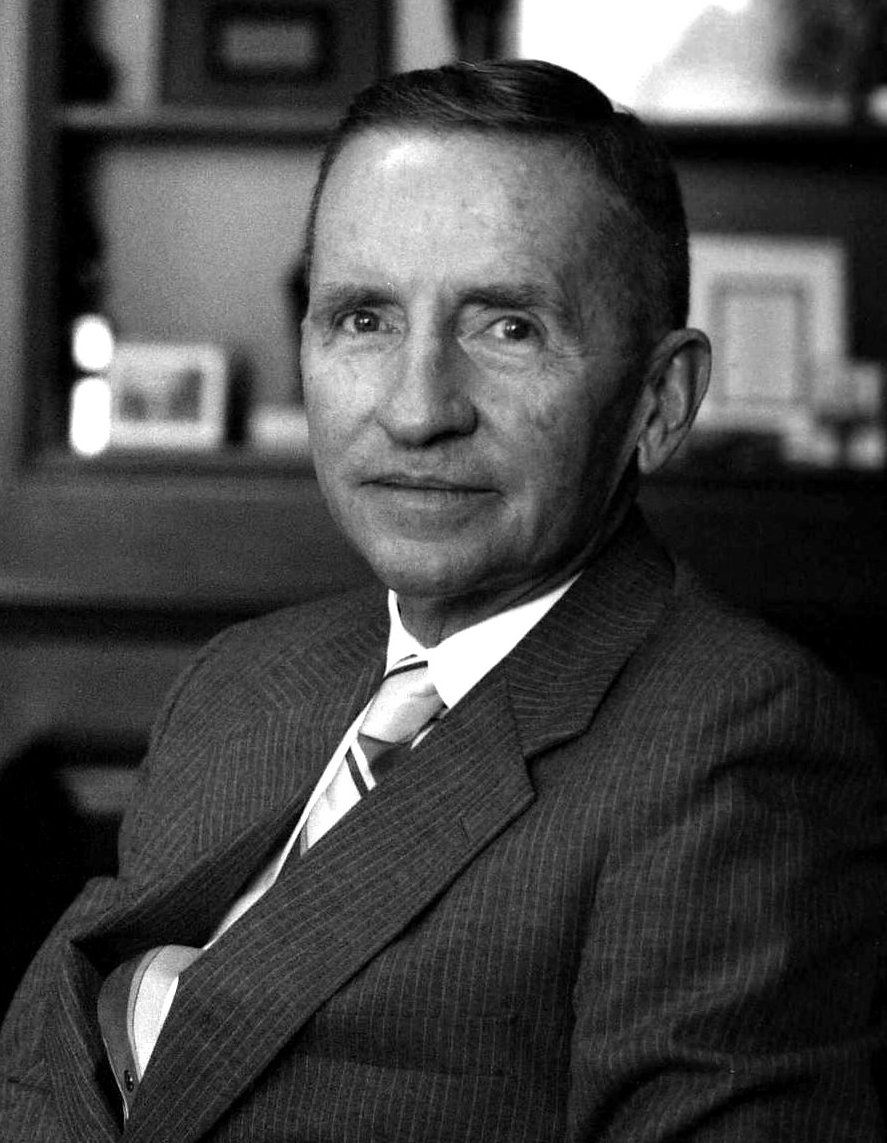
Ross Perot

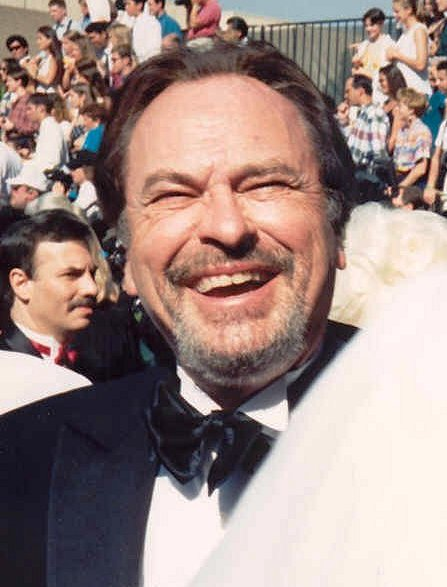
Rip Torn

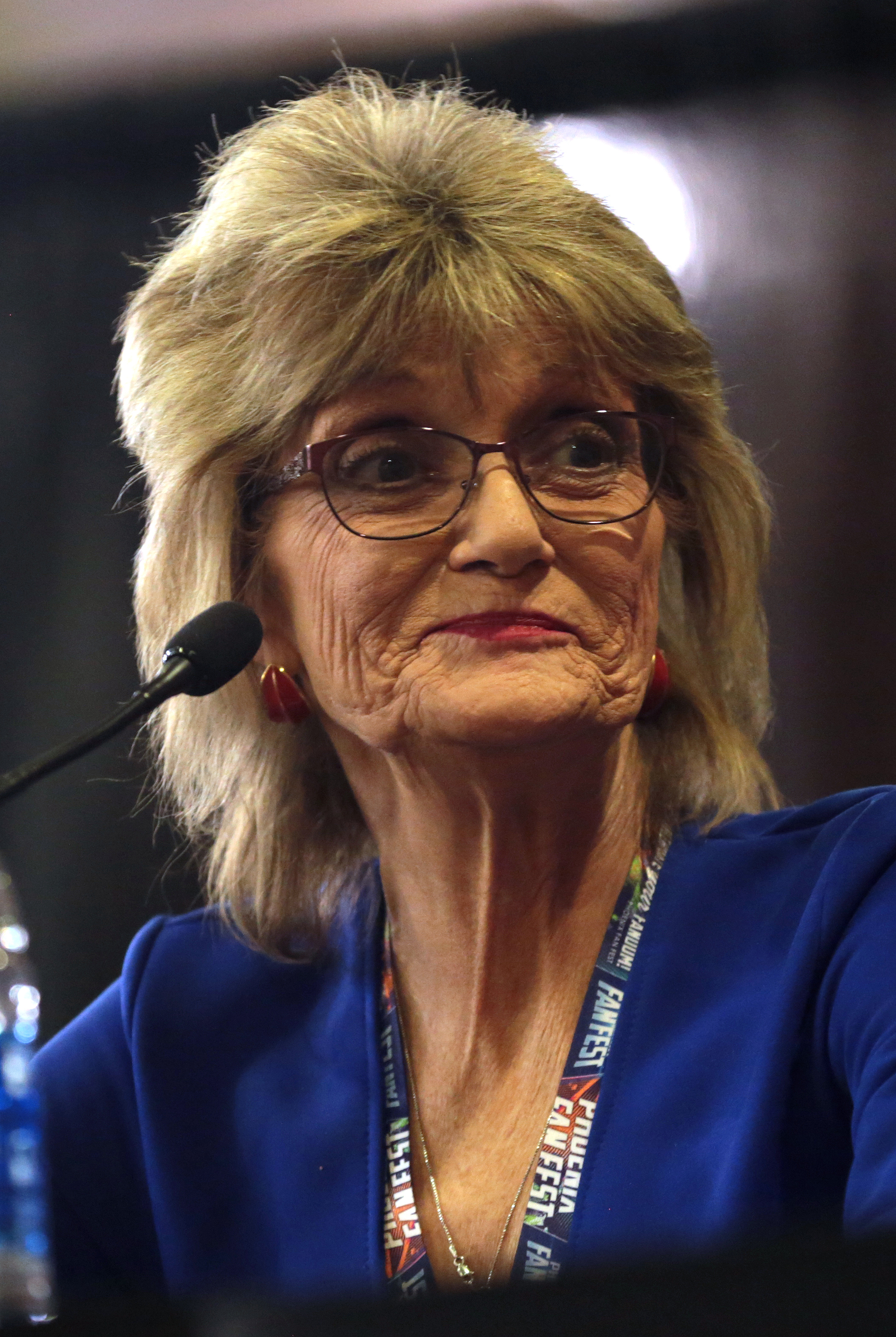
Denise Nickerson

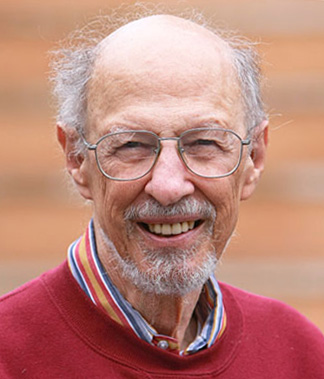
Fernando J. Corbató

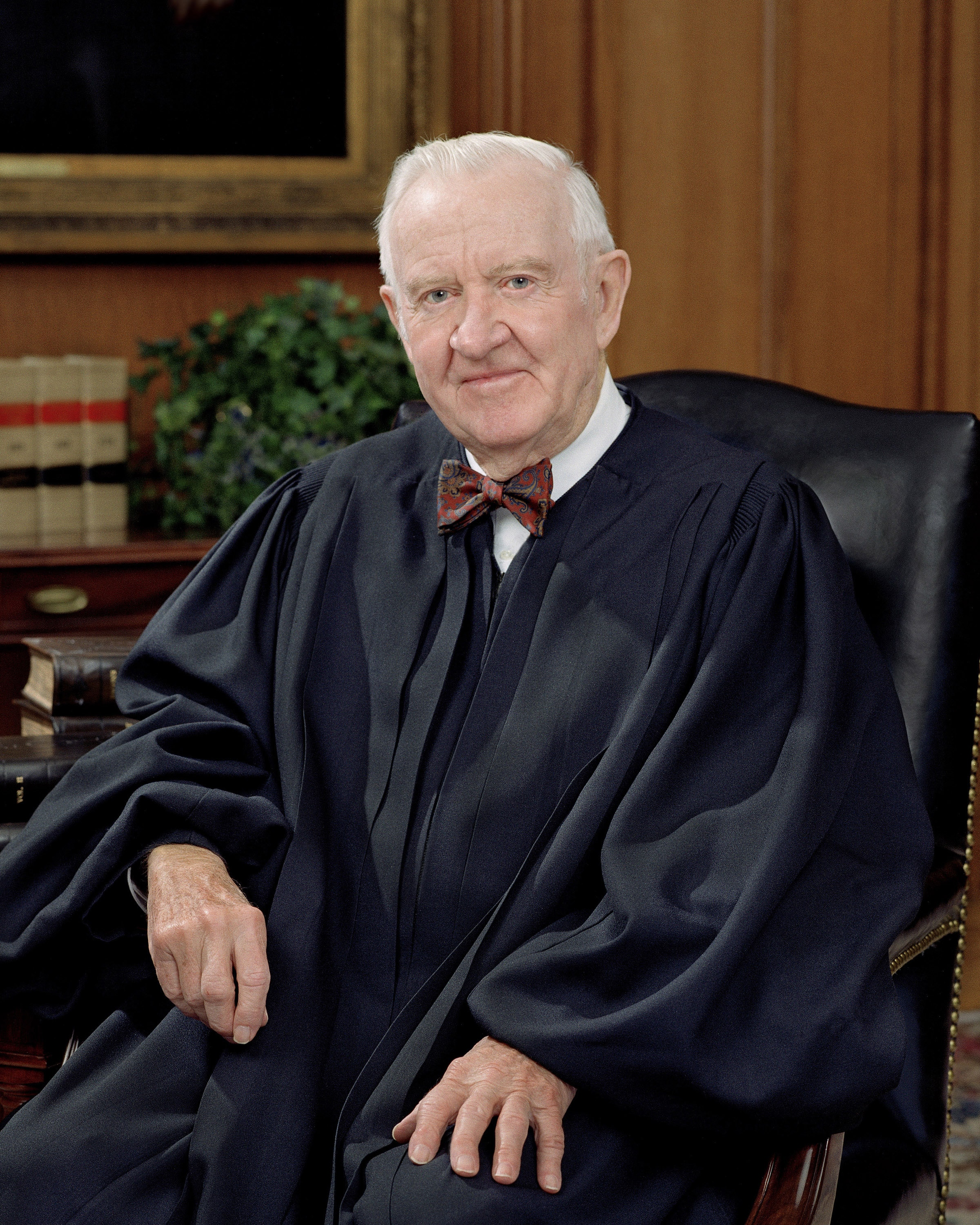
John Paul Stevens

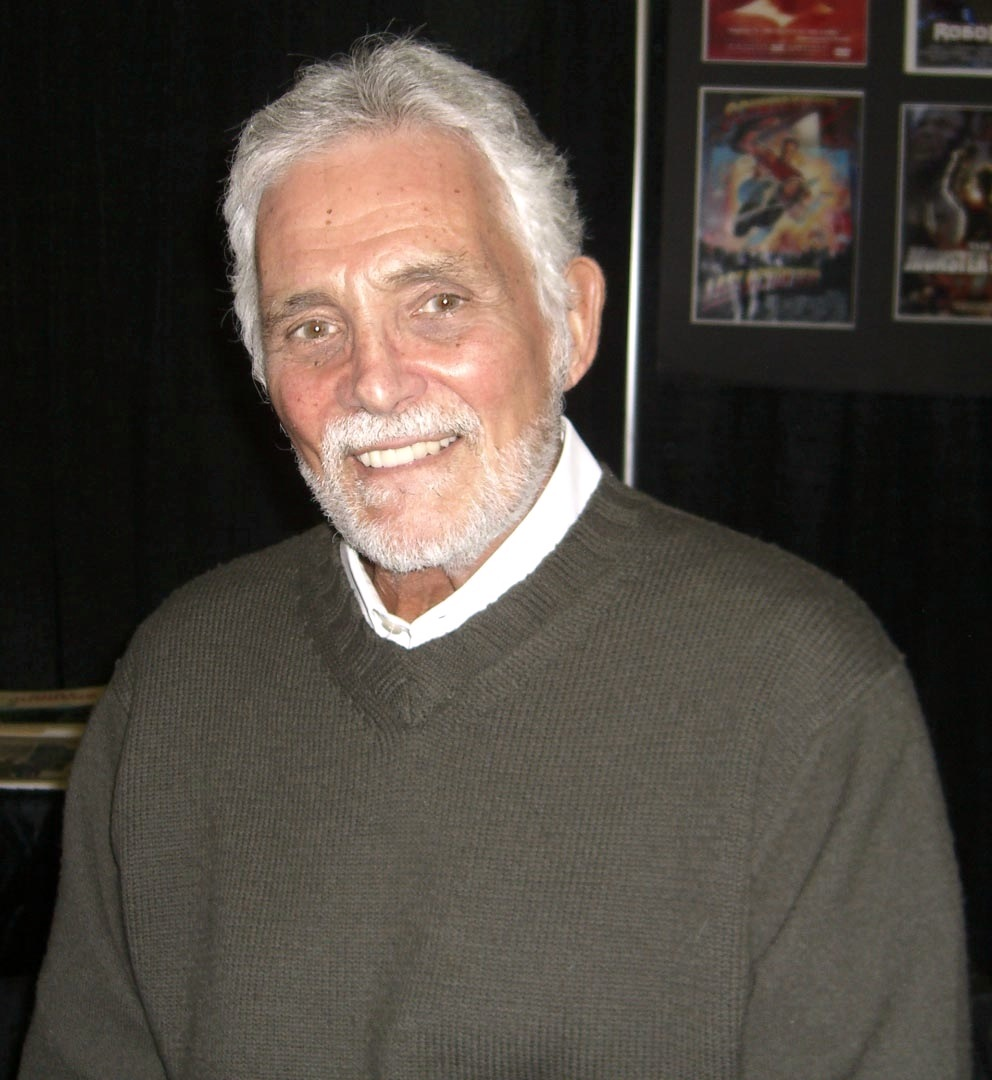
David Hedison

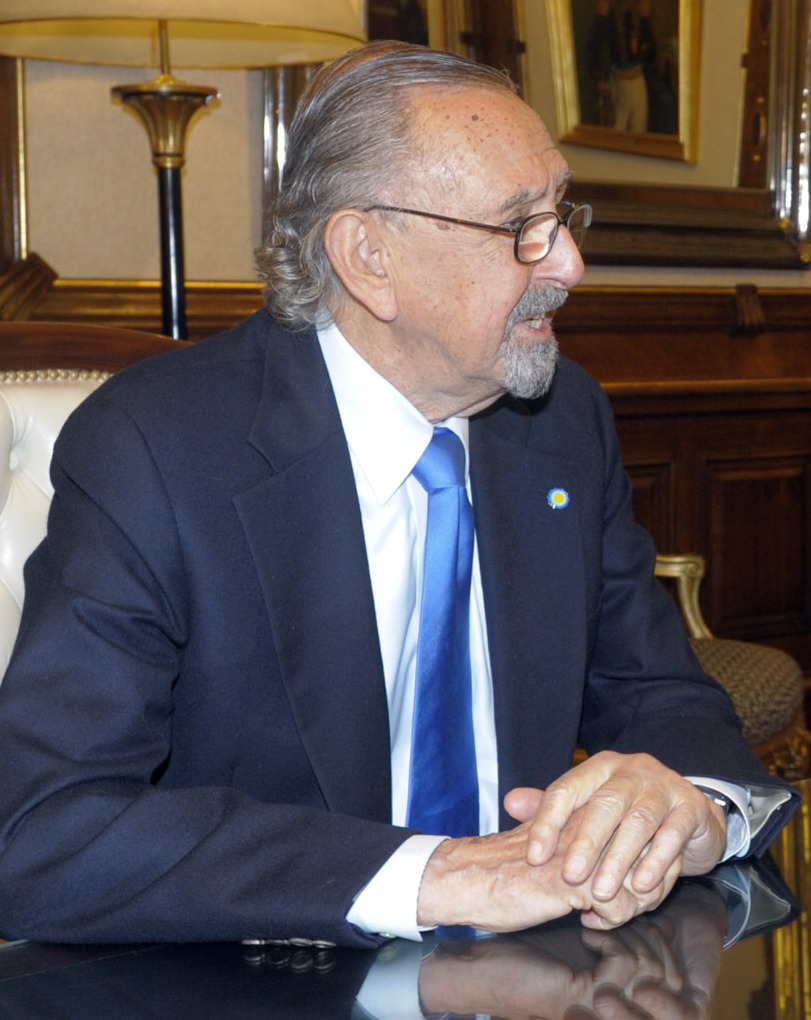
César Pelli

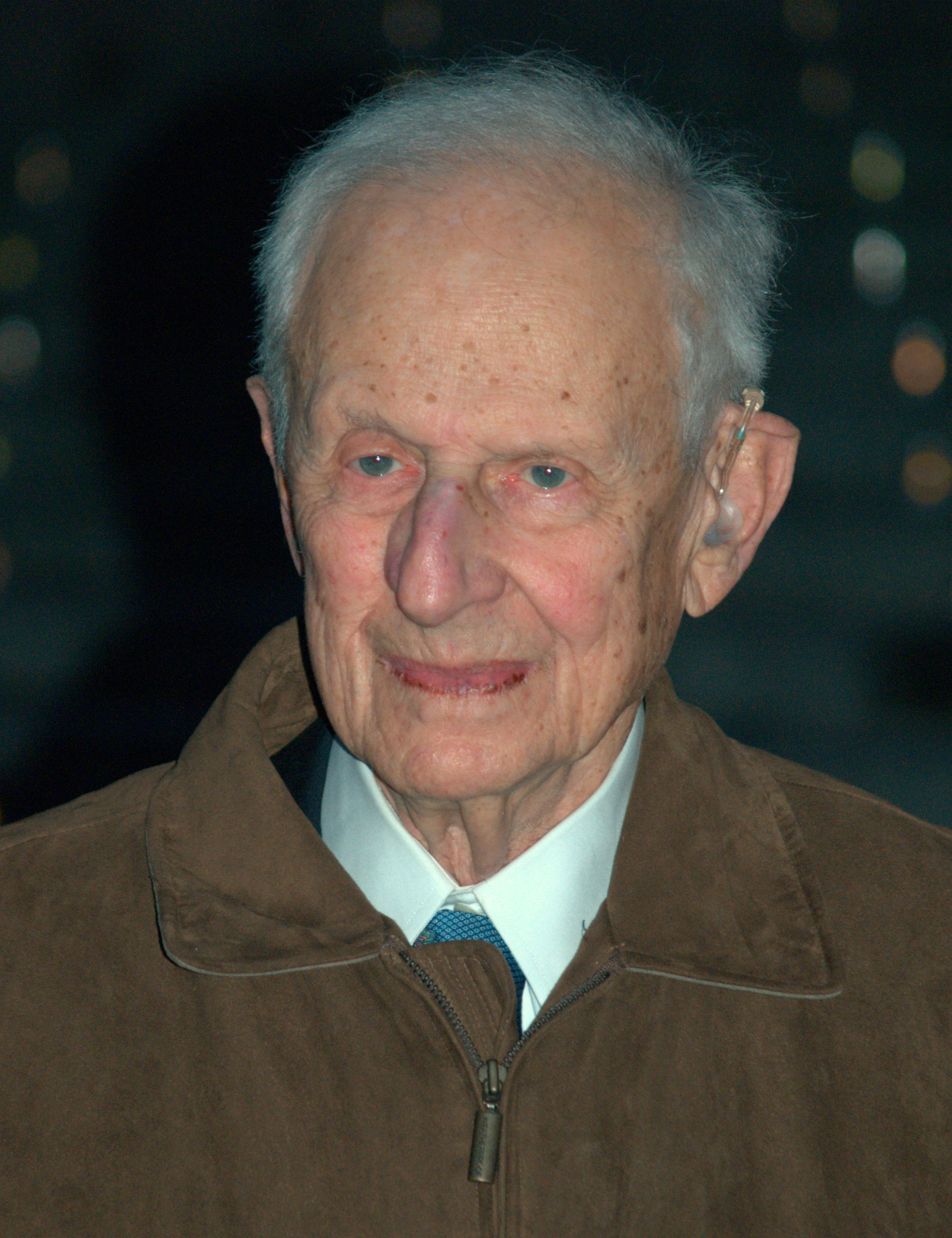
Robert Morgenthau

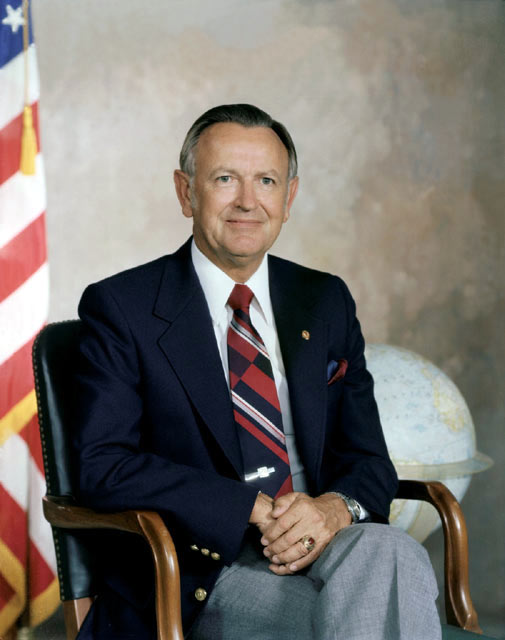
Christopher C. Kraft Jr.

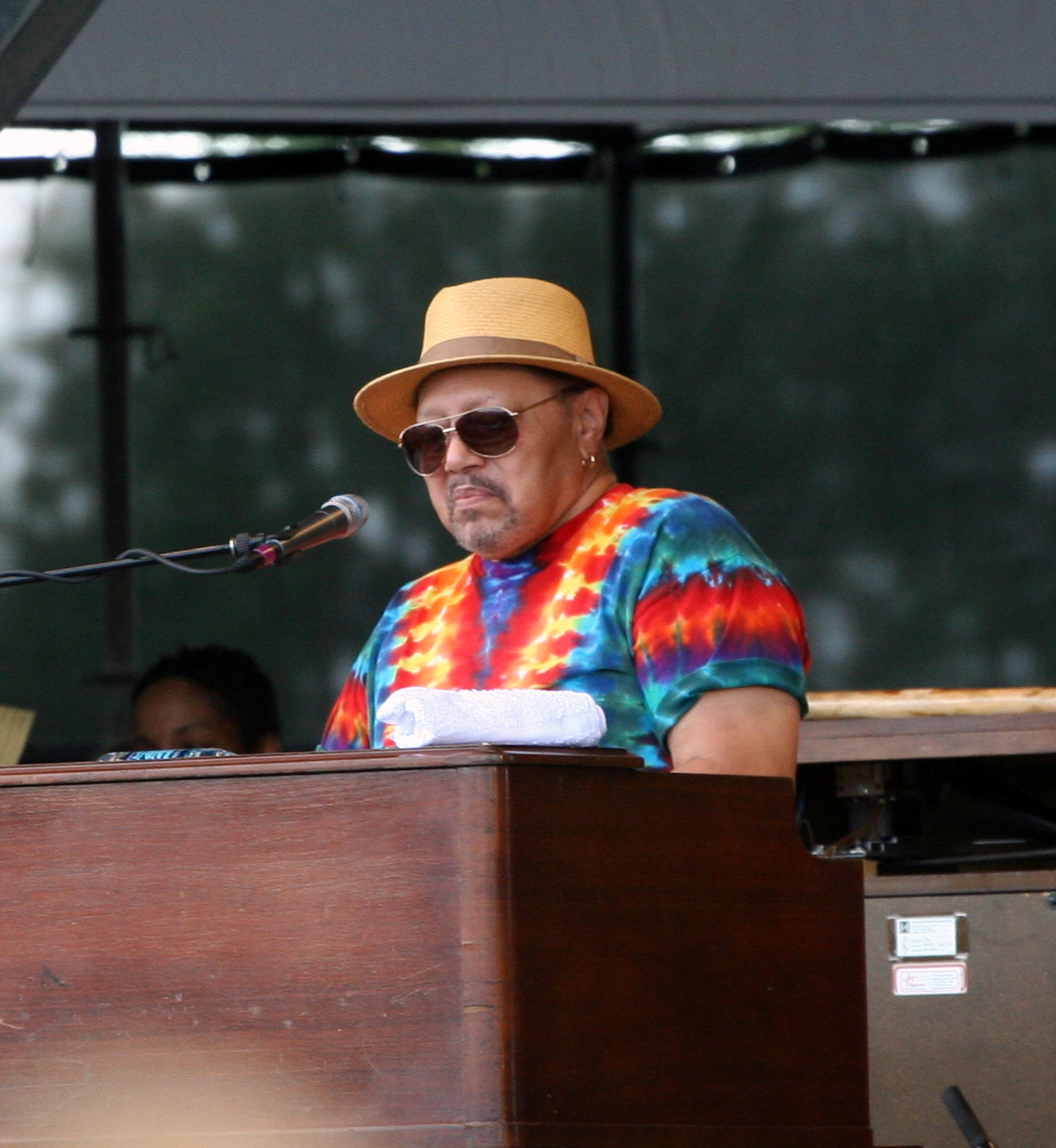
Art Neville

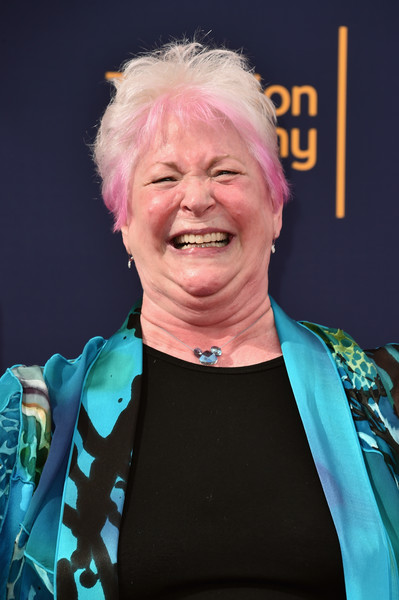
Russi Taylor

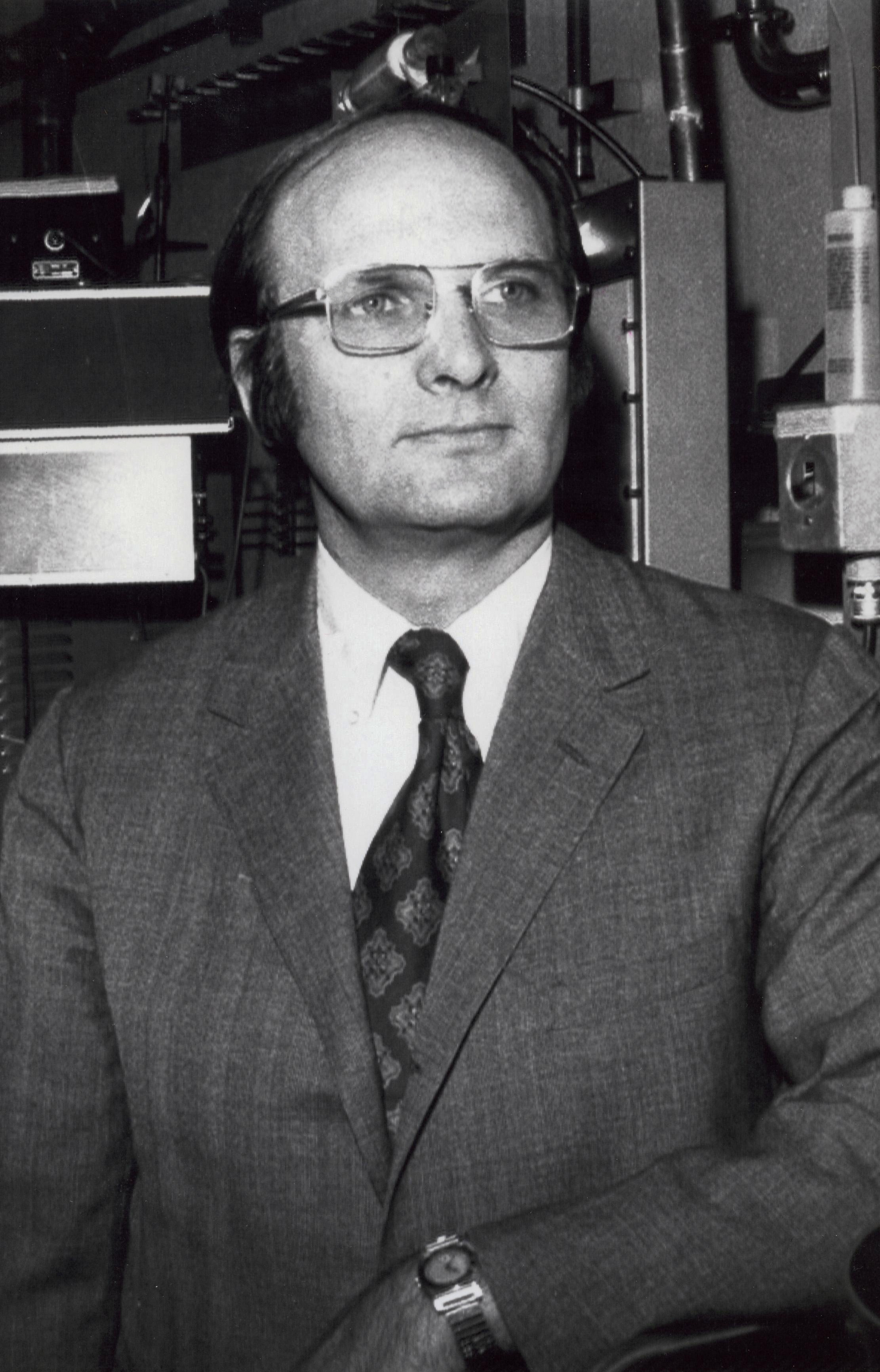
John Robert Schrieffer

- July 1
  - Norman Geisler, Christian theologian (b. 1932)
  - Rolland Golden, artist (b. 1931)
  - Derrill Osborn, fashion executive (b. 1942)
  - Sid Ramin, music arranger and composer (b. 1919)
  - Jerry Seltzer, roller derby promoter (b. 1932)
  - Tyler Skaggs, baseball pitcher (b. 1991)
- July 2
  - Don Ballard, politician (b. 1927)
  - Lee Iacocca, automotive executive (b. 1924)
  - Mr. Two Bits, amateur cheerleader (b. 1922)
- July 3
  - Arte Johnson, comedian and actor (b. 1929)
  - Gary Kolb, baseball player (b. 1940)
  - Jared Lorenzen, football quarterback (b. 1981)
  - Tony Robichaux, baseball player and coach (b. 1961)
- July 4
  - Robert A. Bernhard, banker (b. 1928)
  - Chris Cline, billionaire mining entrepreneur (b. 1958)
  - Bob Gilliland, pilot, first man to fly SR-71 Blackbird (b. 1925)
  - Robert F. Marx, scuba diver (b. 1936)
  - Wayne Mass, football player (b. 1946)
  - Vivian Perlis, musicologist (b. 1928)
- July 5
  - Marie Borroff, poet and translator (b. 1923)
  - Douglas Crimp, art historian, writer and curator (b. 1944)
  - Tzemach Cunin, Chabad-Lubavitch rabbi (b. 1976)
  - Lewis Lloyd, basketball player (b. 1959)
  - Marie Ponsot, poet and literary critic (b. 1921)
  - Kathleen Sims, politician (b. 1942)
- July 6
  - Cameron Boyce, actor (b. 1999)
  - Martin Charnin, lyricist and theatre director (b. 1934)
  - Eddie Jones, actor (b. 1934)
  - Calvin Quate, electrical engineer (b. 1923)
- July 7
  - Steve Cannon, writer (b. 1935)
  - Bob Fouts, sportscaster (b. 1921)
  - Wolfgang Joklik, Austrian-born virologist (b. 1926)
- July 8
  - Rosie Ruiz, Cuban-American marathon runner and fraudster (b. 1953)
  - Paul Schramka, baseball player and funeral director (b. 1928)
  - Michael Seidenberg, writer and bookseller (b. 1954)
- July 9
  - Miriam Butterworth, politician and educator (b. 1918)
  - William E. Dannemeyer, politician (b. 1929)
  - Phil Freelon, architect (b. 1952)
  - Glenn Mickens, baseball pitcher (b. 1930)
  - Ross Perot, billionaire businessman, philanthropist, and presidential candidate (b. 1930)
  - Aaron Rosand, violinist (b. 1927)
  - Marian Spencer, civil rights activist and politician (b. 1920)
  - Rip Torn, actor and comedian (b. 1931)
- July 10
  - Jim Bouton, baseball player (b. 1939)
  - Jerry Lawson, singer and musician (b. 1944)
  - Walt Michaels, football player and coach (b. 1929)
  - Denise Nickerson, actress (b. 1957)
  - Dorothy Toy, Japanese-American dancer (b. 1917)
- July 11
  - Robert Francis Christian, Roman Catholic prelate (b. 1948)
  - Mark E. Talisman, congressional aide and lobbyist (b. 1941)
  - William H. Walls, federal judge (b. 1932)
- July 12
  - Fernando J. Corbató, computer scientist (b. 1926)
  - Joe Grzenda, baseball player (b. 1937)
  - Arno Marsh, saxophonist (b. 1928)
  - Sadie Roberts-Joseph, civil rights activist (b. 1944)
  - Russell Smith, singer-songwriter (b. 1949)
- July 13
  - Bob Bastian, politician (b. 1938)
  - Paul F. Markham, attorney (b. 1930)
  - Ida Wyman, photographer (b. 1926)
- July 14
  - Mike Maser, football coach (b. 1947)
  - Ernie Mims, television personality (b. 1932)
  - Sterling Tucker, politician and civil rights activist (b. 1923)
  - Pernell Whitaker, boxer (b. 1964)
  - Paul Albert Zipfel, Roman Catholic prelate (b. 1935)
- July 15
  - Mortimer Caplin, lawyer and educator (b. 1916)
  - Edith Irby Jones, physician and civil rights activist (b. 1927)
  - Bruce Laingen, diplomat (b. 1922)
- July 16
  - Adam Bob, football player (b. 1967)
  - Ernie Broglio, baseball player (b. 1935)
  - Daniel Callahan, philosopher and bioethics researcher (b. 1930)
  - John Paul Stevens, U.S. Supreme Court associate justice (b. 1920)
  - John Tanton, anti-immigration activist (b. 1934)
- July 17
  - Pumpsie Green, baseball player (b. 1933)
  - Duane Mutch, politician (b. 1925)
  - Wesley Pruden, journalist and editor (b. 1935)
- July 18
  - Bob Frank, singer-songwriter (b. 1944)
  - David Hedison, actor (b. 1927)
  - Kurt Julius Isselbacher, German-born physician (b. 1925)
  - Ben Kinchlow, author, minister and televangelist (b. 1936)
  - Macy Morse, peace activist and anti-nuclear activist (b. 1921)
  - Mitch Petrus, football player (b. 1987)
- July 19
  - Don Mossi, baseball player (b. 1929)
  - César Pelli, Argentine-American architect (b. 1926)
  - Bert Rechichar, football player (b. 1930)
  - Jerome B. Simandle, federal judge (b. 1949)
  - Marylou Whitney, socialite, philanthropist, and racehorse owner-breeder (b. 1925)
  - Patrick Winston, computer scientist (b. 1943)
- July 20
  - Nick Harrison, racecar driver (b. 1982)
  - R. James Harvey, federal judge (b. 1922)
  - Liane Russell, Austrian-born geneticist and conservationist (b. 1923)
- July 21
  - Ben Johnston, composer (b. 1926)
  - Paul Krassner, author and political activist (b. 1932)
  - Robert Morgenthau, lawyer (b. 1919)
- July 22
  - Dan Clemens, politician (b. 1945)
  - Christopher C. Kraft Jr., aerospace engineer (b. 1924)
  - Richard A. Macksey, academic (b. 1931)
  - Art Neville, singer-songwriter and musician (b. 1937)
- July 23
  - Chaser, Border Collie with the largest-tested non-human memory (b. 2004)
  - Dorothy Olsen, aviator (b. 1916)
  - Barney Smith, plumber, artist and museum curator (b. 1921)
  - Lois Wille, journalist (b. 1931)
- July 24
  - Cathy Inglese, basketball coach (b. 1958)
  - Trudy, western lowland gorilla (b. ca.1956)
- July 25
  - John Ferriter, television producer and talent agent (b. 1960)
  - M. Owen Lee, Roman Catholic priest and music scholar (b. 1930)
  - Scott Rubenstein, television writer
- July 26
  - Joan Martin, baseball player (b. 1933)
  - Kevin Roster, poker player and assisted death advocate (b. 1983)
  - Russi Taylor, voice actress (b. 1944)
- July 27
  - Andrew Golden, school shooter (b. 1986)
  - Arthur Lazarus Jr., civil rights lawyer (b. 1926)
  - Edward Lewis, film producer (b. 1919)
  - Keith Lincoln, football player (b. 1939)
  - Mike Roarke, baseball player and coach (b. 1930)
  - John Robert Schrieffer, physicist (b. 1931)
- July 28
  - Howard Nathan, basketball player (b. 1972)
  - Richard Rosenbaum, boxer, lawyer, and judge (b. 1931)
  - Richard Stone, politician and diplomat (b. 1928)
  - Harrison Wilson Jr., educator, basketball coach, and university president (b. 1925)
- July 29
  - Max Falkenstien, sportscaster (b. 1924)
  - Ras G, hip-hop DJ and record producer (b. 1978)
  - Edmond Gionet, politician, member of the New Hampshire House of Representatives (b. 1931).
  - Grant Thompson, YouTuber (b. 1980)
- July 30
  - Nick Buoniconti, football player (b. 1940)
  - Roger Carroll, radio/television announcer and DJ (b. 1930)
  - Rebecca Roeber, politician (b. 1958)
- July 31 – Harold Prince, theatrical producer and director (b. 1928)

== August ==
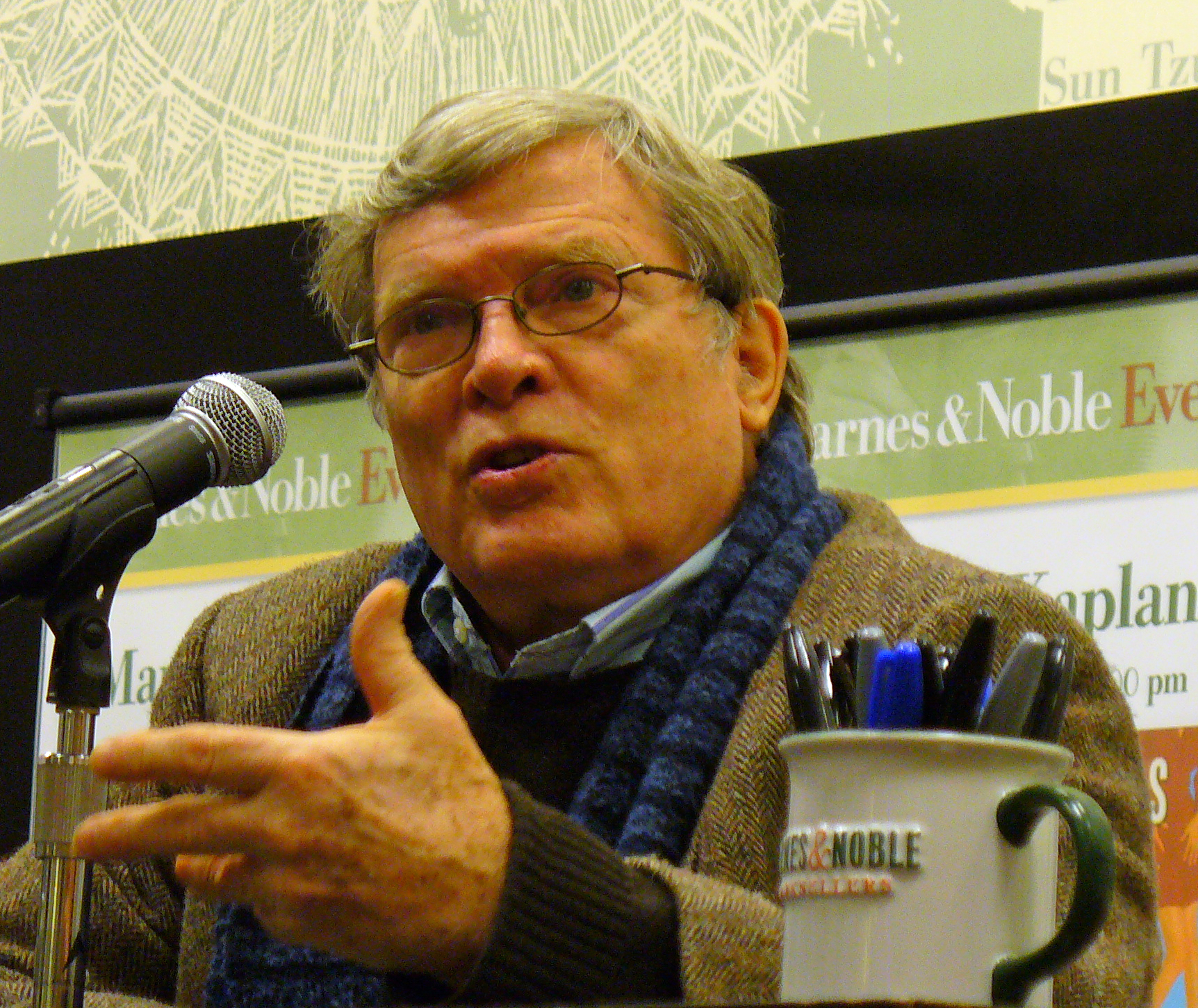
D. A. Pennebaker

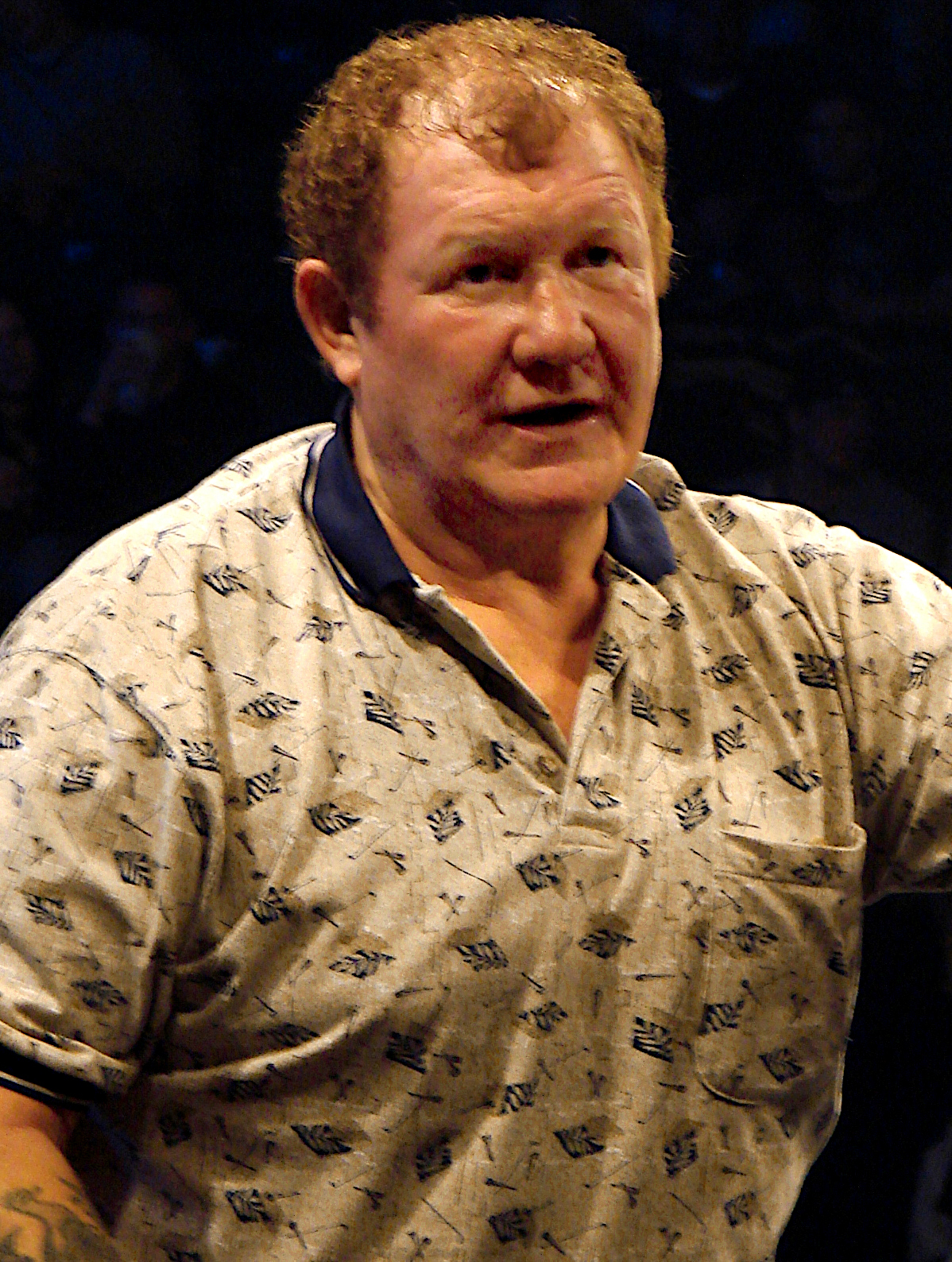
Harley Race

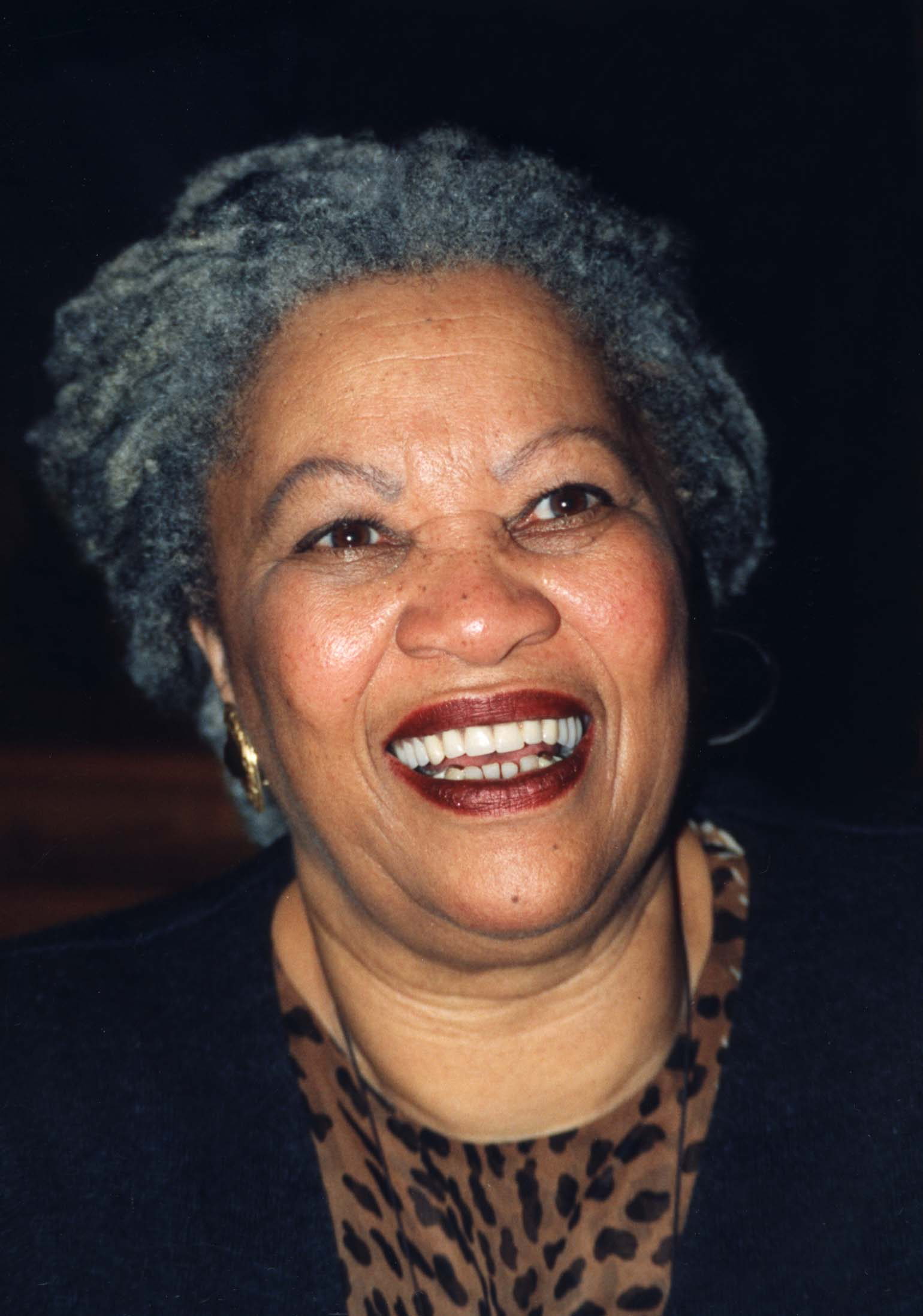
Toni Morrison

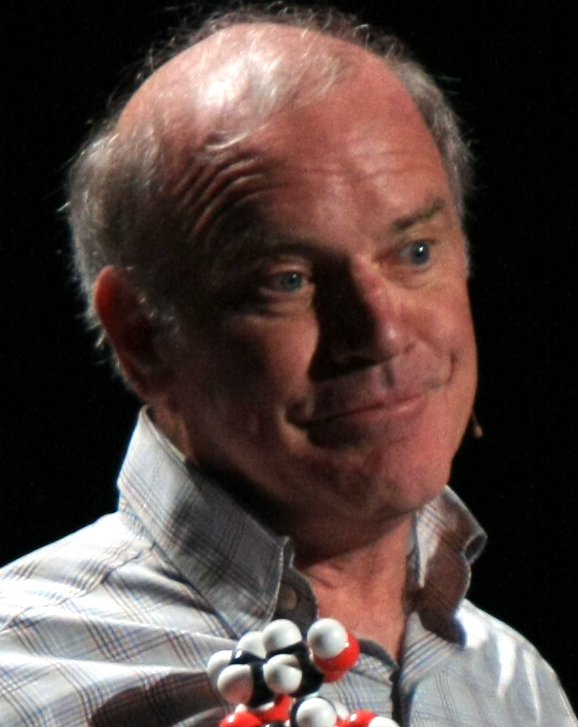
Kary Mullis

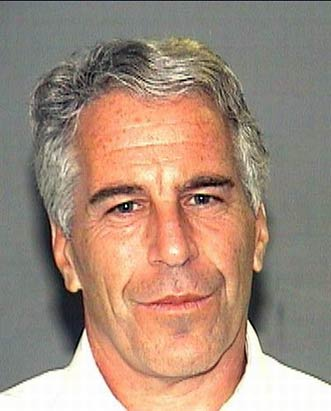
Jeffrey Epstein

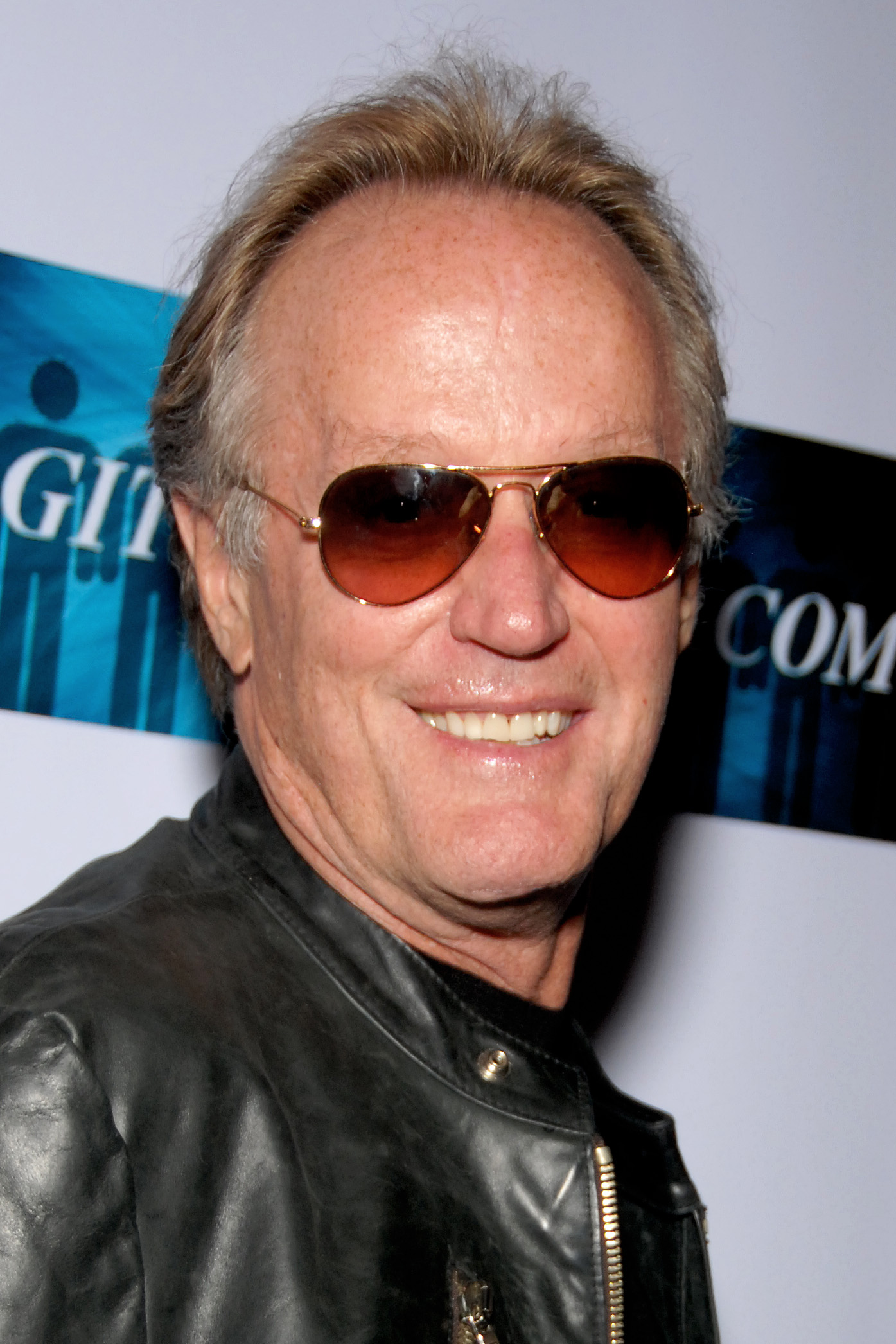
Peter Fonda

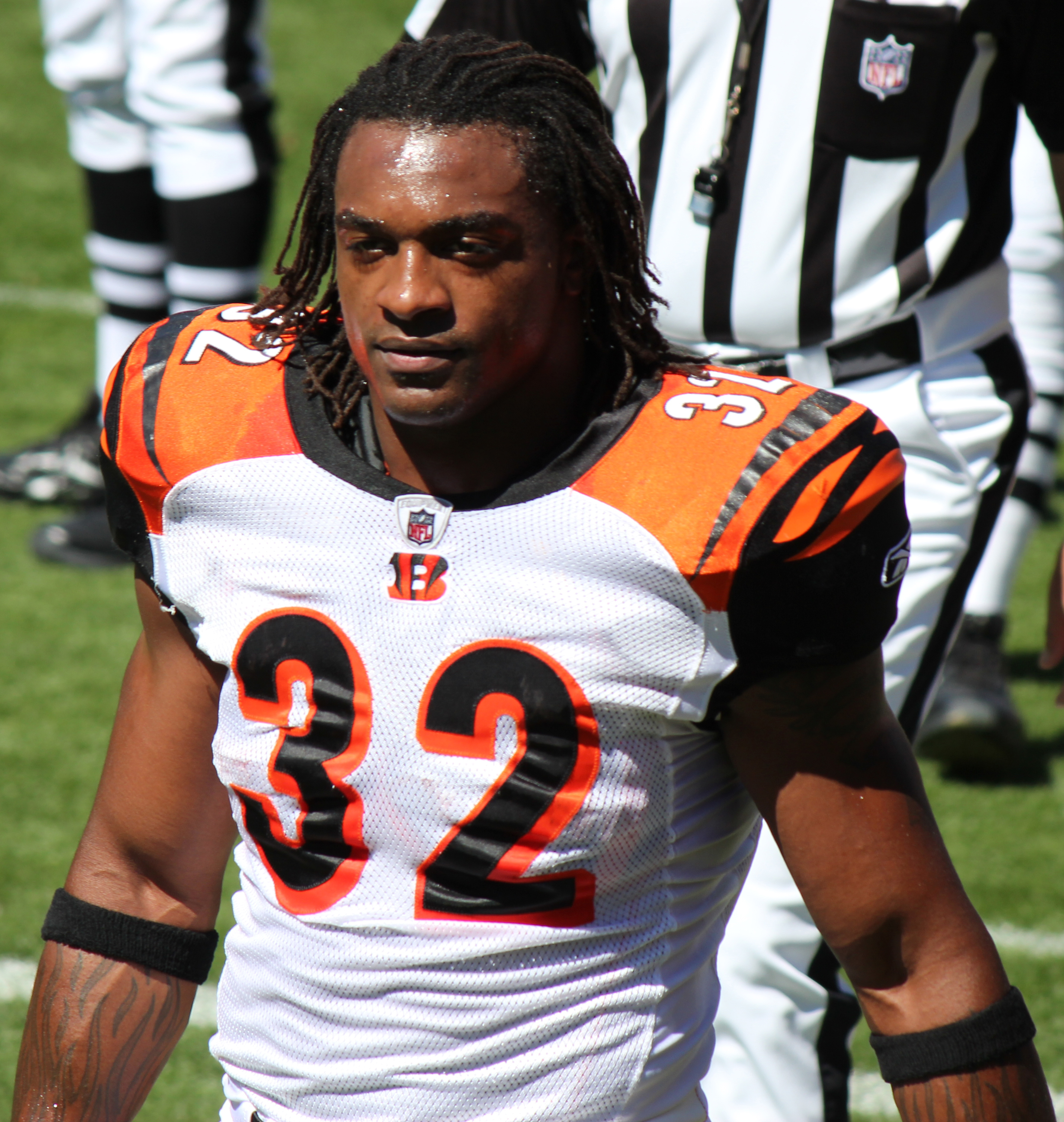
Cedric Benson

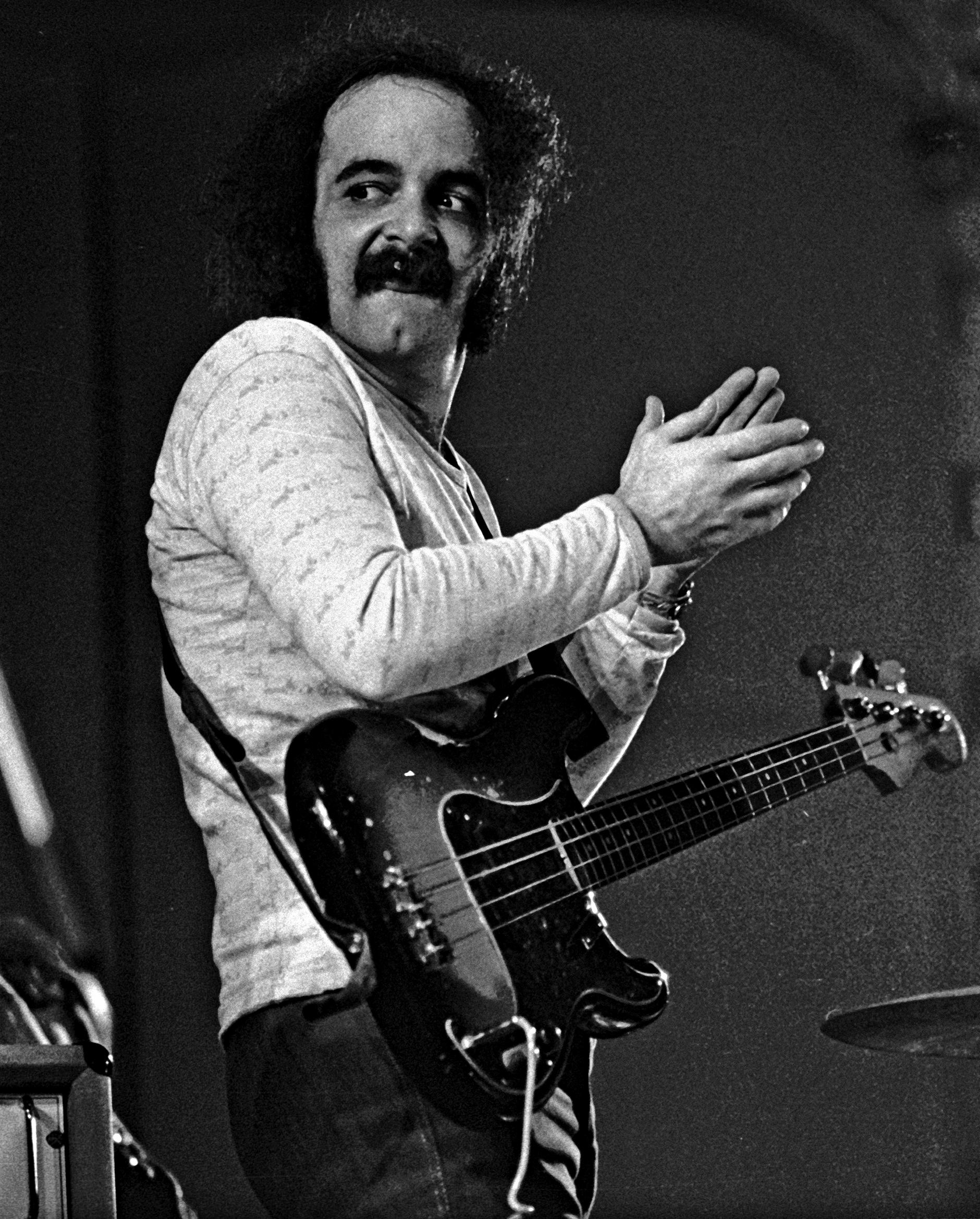
Larry Taylor

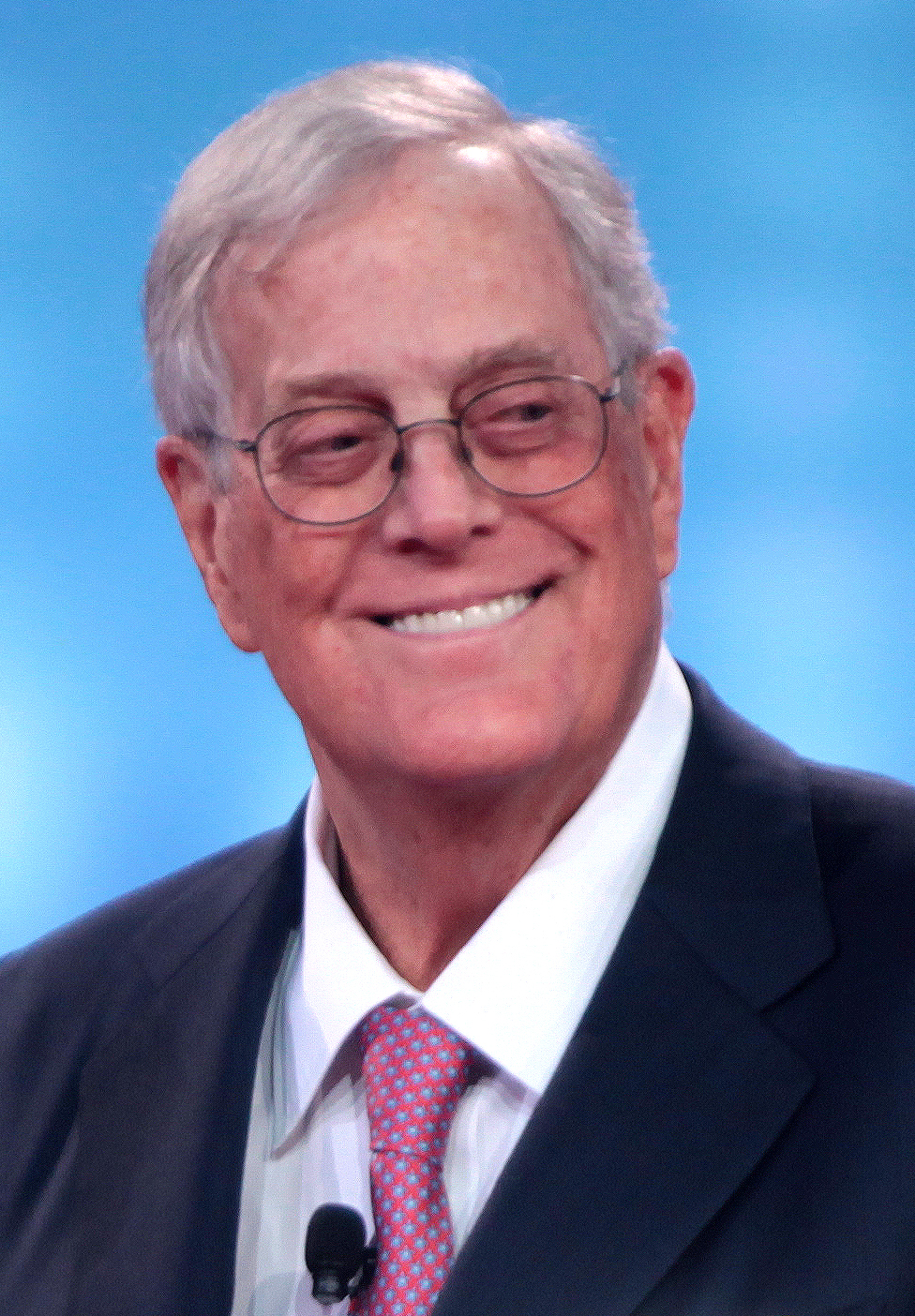
David Koch

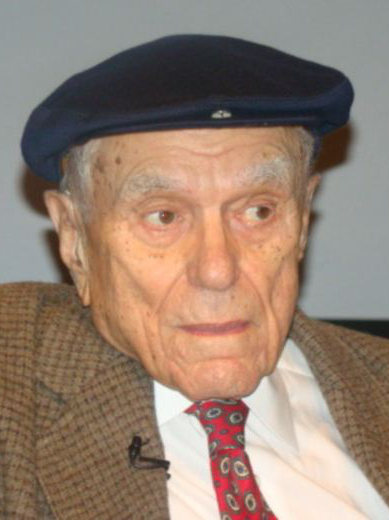
Sidney Rittenberg

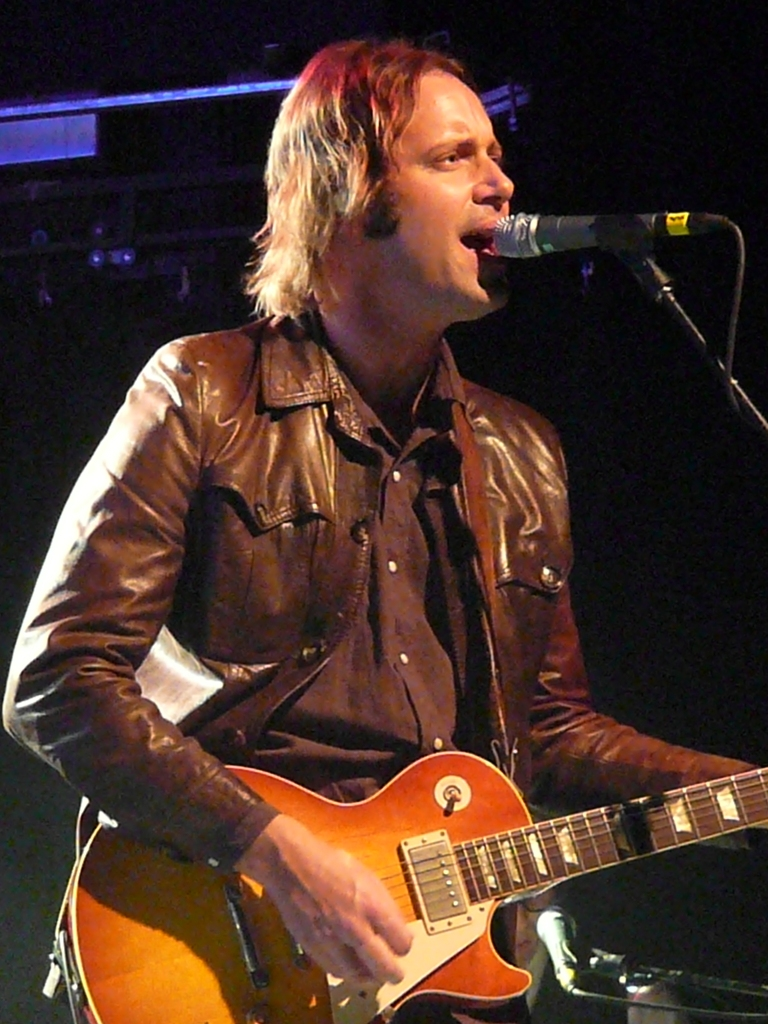
Neal Casal

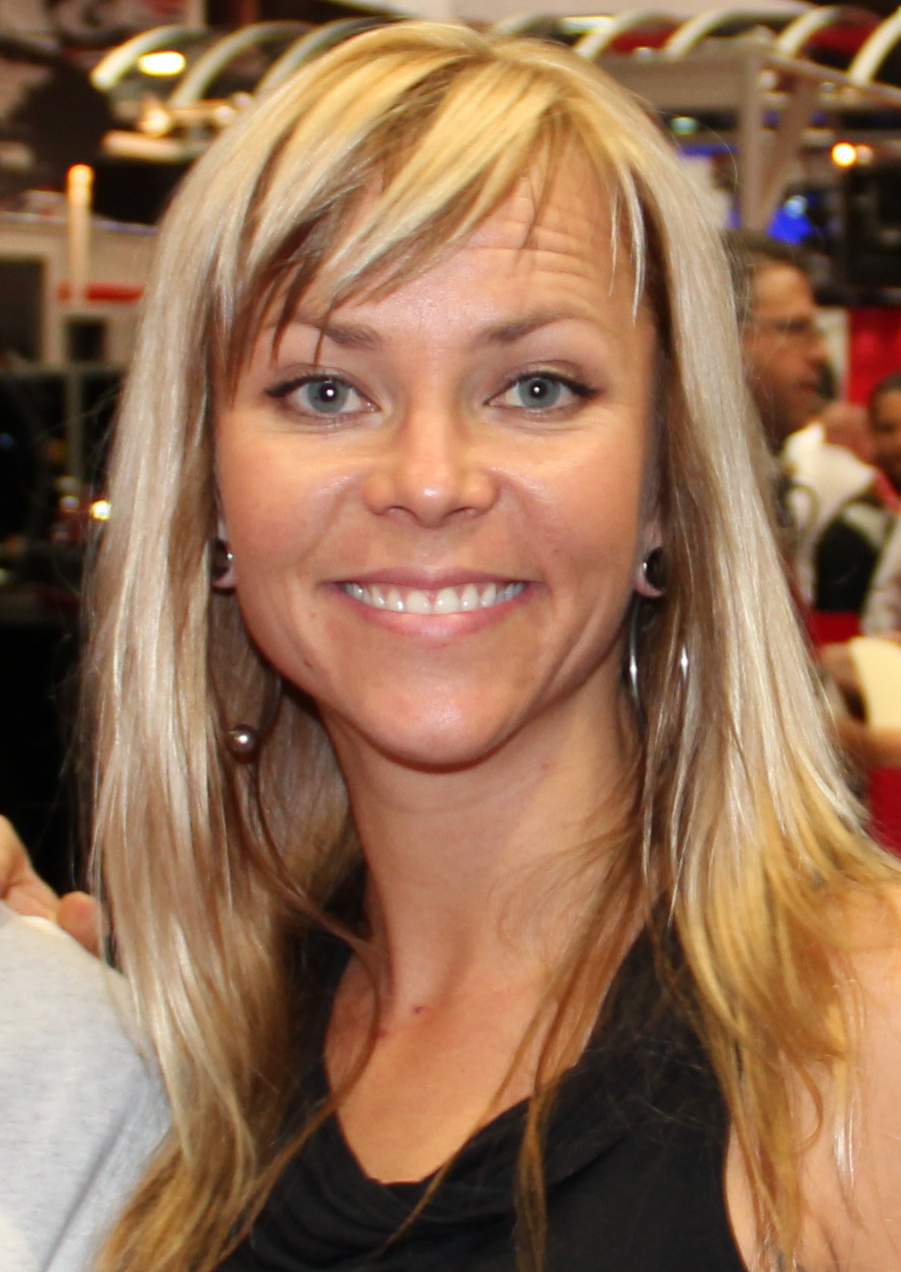
Jessi Combs

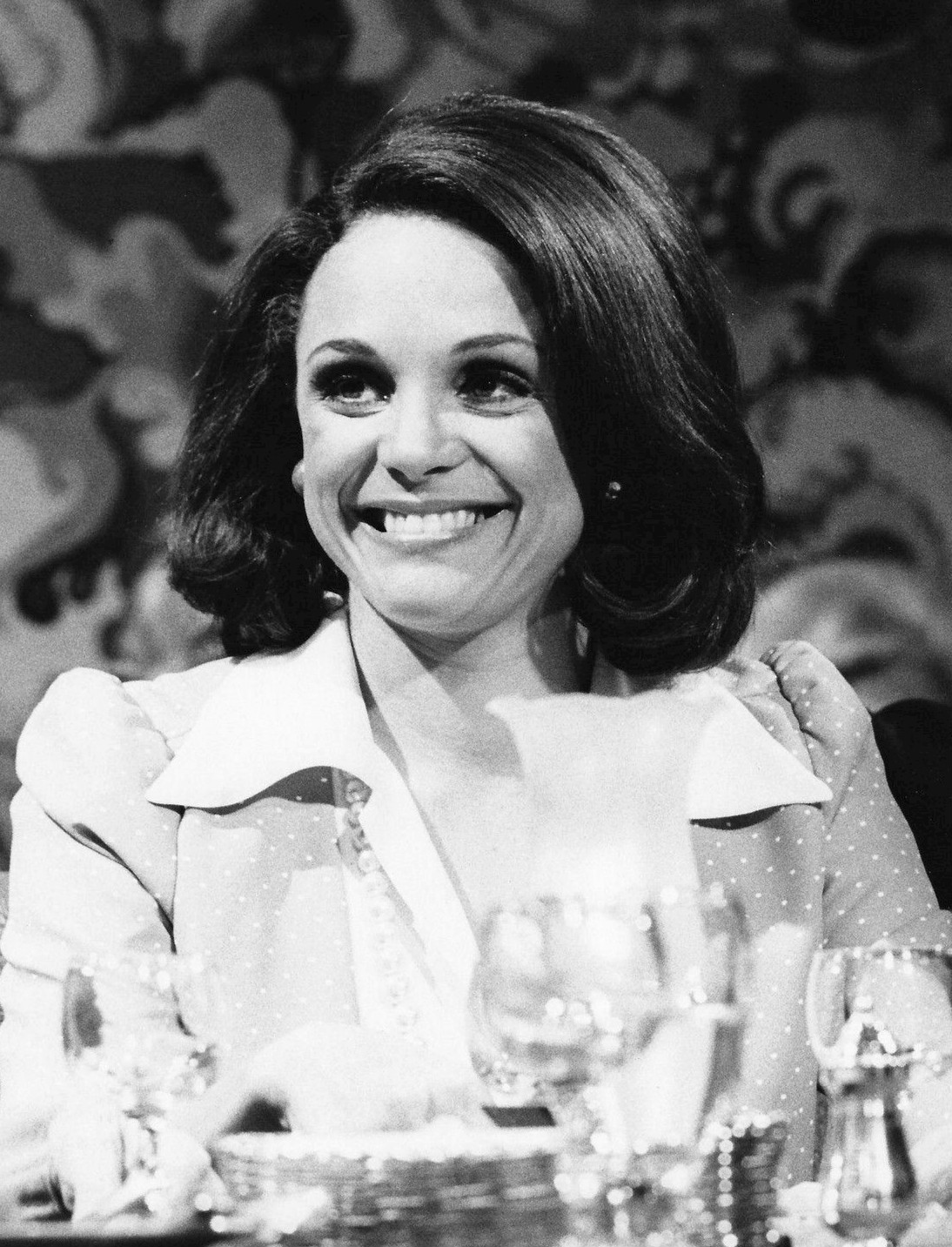
Valerie Harper

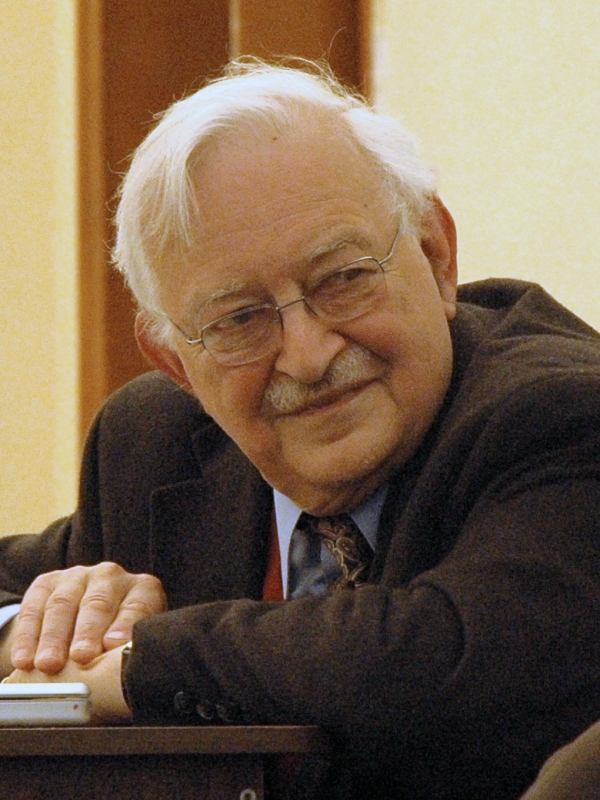
Immanuel Wallerstein

- August 1
  - Jack Dolbin, football player (b. 1948)
  - Martin Mayer, economist and writer (b. 1928)
  - D. A. Pennebaker, documentary filmmaker (b. 1925)
  - Harley Race, professional wrestler, promoter, and trainer (b. 1943)
- August 2
  - Carl Bell, physician and author (b. 1947)
  - David Bevington, literary scholar (b. 1931)
  - Vahakn Dadrian, Armenian-American sociologist and historian (b. 1926)
- August 3
  - Cliff Branch, football player (b. 1948)
  - L. Brooks Patterson, lawyer and politician (b. 1939)
  - Mike Troy, swimmer and Olympic gold medalist (b. 1940)
- August 4
  - Ernie Bowman, professional baseball player (b. 1935)
  - Thomas Gulotta, government official (b. 1944)
  - Ann Nelson, particle physicist (b. 1958)
  - Stu Rosen, voice actor, television writer, and director (b. 1939)
  - Bob Wilber, jazz clarinetist, saxophonist, and band leader (b. 1928)
- August 5
  - Sidney Goldstein, demographer (b. 1927)
  - Lizzie Grey, rock musician (b. 1958)
  - Toni Morrison, novelist, essayist, editor, teacher and professor (b. 1931)
  - Jeffrey Tarrant, investor (b. 1956)
- August 6 – George F. Simmons, mathematician (b. 1925)
- August 7
  - David Berman, musician, poet, and cartoonist (b. 1967)
  - Chris Birch, politician (b. 1950)
  - Barbara Crane, photographer (b. 1928)
  - Nancy Reddin Kienholz, installation artist (b. 1943)
  - Donald F. Klein, psychiatrist (b. 1928)
  - Kary Mullis, biochemist (b. 1944)
  - Francesca Sundsten, painter (b. 1960)
- August 8
  - Ernie Colón, comics artist (b. 1931)
  - Theodore L. Eliot Jr., ambassador (b. 1928)
  - Lee Bennett Hopkins, educator and poet (b. 1938)
  - Dave Parks, football player (b. 1941)
- August 9
  - Paul Findley, politician (b. 1921)
  - Bill Mills, baseball player (b. 1919)
- August 10
  - Joseph Begich, politician (b. 1930)
  - Jeffrey Epstein, financier and convicted sex offender (b. 1953)
  - J. Neil Schulman, author (b. 1953)
- August 11
  - Jim Cullum Jr., jazz cornetist (b. 1941)
  - Darryl Drake, football player and coach (b. 1956)
  - Michael E. Krauss, linguist (b. 1934)
  - Charles Santore, illustrator (b. 1935)
- August 12
  - Danny Cohen, Israeli-American computer scientist (b. 1937)
  - Jim Marsh, basketball player and broadcaster (b. 1946)
  - Paule Marshall, writer (b. 1929)
- August 15
  - Claire Cloninger, Christian author and songwriter (b. 1942)
  - Samuel Gelfman, film producer (b. 1931)
  - Eddie Marlin, professional wrestler (b. 1930)
  - Wrestling Pro, professional wrestler (b. 1938)
- August 16
  - Gustavo Barreiro, Cuban-American politician (b. 1959)
  - Peter Fonda, actor (b. 1940)
  - Jim Hardy, football player (b. 1923)
  - Mike McGee, football player, coach, and college athletic director (b. 1938)
- August 17
  - Cedric Benson, football player (b. 1982)
  - Allen Church, alpine skiing official (b. 1928)
  - Rosemary Kuhlmann, operatic mezzo-soprano and musical theatre actress (b. 1922)
  - Donald A.B. Lindberg, physician (b. 1933)
- August 18
  - Kathleen Blanco, politician (b. 1942)
  - Chad Holt, writer and actor (b. 1972)
  - Jack Whitaker, sportscaster (b. 1924)
- August 19
  - James R. Alexander, sound engineer (b. 1930)
  - Benjamin N. Bellis, air force lieutenant general (b. 1924)
  - Barry Bennett, football player (b. 1955)
  - Al Jackson, baseball pitcher (b. 1935)
  - Harry B. Luthi, businessman and politician (b. 1934)
  - Jack Perkins, journalist and television host (b. 1933)
  - Larry Taylor, bass guitarist (b. 1942)
- August 20
  - Russ Conway, sports journalist (b. 1949)
  - Lico Reyes, Mexican-American actor and politician (b. 1946)
  - Larry Siegel, comedy writer (b. 1925)
  - Kelsey Weems, basketball player (b. 1967)
- August 22
  - Gary Ray Bowles, serial killer (b. 1962)
  - Bobby Dillon, football player (b. 1930)
  - Werner H. Kramarsky, Dutch-American public official and art collector (b. 1926)
  - Tom Nissalke, basketball coach (b. 1932)
  - Gerard O'Neill, journalist (b. 1942)
  - Morton Tubor, film editor (b. 1917)
- August 23
  - Larissa Bonfante, Italian-American classicist and archaeologist (b. 1931)
  - Clora Bryant, jazz trumpeter (b. 1927)
  - Clint Conatser, baseball player (b. 1921)
  - Mario Davidovsky, Argentine-American composer (b. 1934)
  - David Koch, billionaire businessman and political activist (b. 1940)
  - Alexander M. Schenker, Polish-American Slavist (b. 1924)
- August 24
  - David Akiba, photographer (b. 1940)
  - Tex Clevenger, baseball pitcher (b. 1932)
  - Reb Foster, radio DJ and music manager (b. 1936)
  - Sidney Rittenberg, American-Chinese journalist and linguist (b. 1921)
  - Dick Woodard, football player (b. 1926)
- August 25
  - Sally Floyd, computer scientist (b. 1950)
  - Vince Naimoli, baseball team owner (b. 1937)
  - Jerry Rook, basketball player (b. 1943)
- August 26
  - Neal Casal, guitarist, singer, songwriter, and photographer (b. 1968)
  - Colin Clark, soccer player (b. 1984)
  - Richard Conrad, opera singer (b. 1935)
  - Reb Foster, radio DJ (b. 1936)
  - Tom Jordan, baseball player (b. 1919)
  - Isabel Toledo, Cuban-American fashion designer (b. 1960)
- August 27
  - Pedro Bell, illustrator (b. ca. 1950)
  - Albert Vickers Bryan Jr., judge (b. 1926)
  - Jessi Combs, racing driver and television personality (b. 1983)
  - Frances Crowe, peace activist and pacifist (b. 1919)
  - Wadie P. Deddeh, politician (b. 1920)
  - Donnie Fritts, singer-songwriter and keyboardist (b. 1942)
  - Martin Weitzman, economist (b. 1942)
- August 28
  - Donnie Green, football player (b. 1948)
  - Nancy Holloway, actress and singer (b. 1932)
  - Sean Stephenson, therapist and self-help author (b. 1979)
- August 29
  - Biba Caggiano, Italian-American chef and restaurateur (b. 1936)
  - Lila Cockrell, politician (b. 1922)
  - Richard Geist, politician (b. 1944)
  - Jim Langer, football player (b. 1948)
  - Jim Leavelle, police detective (b. 1920)
  - Randy Romero, jockey (b. 1957)
- August 30
  - Gordon Bressack, television writer (b. 1951)
  - Bernard F. Grabowski, politician (b. 1923)
  - Valerie Harper, actress (b. 1939)
  - Michael Lindsay, voice actor (b. 1963)
- August 31
  - Jeff Blackshear, football player (b. 1969)
  - Leslie H. Gelb, journalist and diplomat (b. 1937)
  - William J. Larkin Jr., politician (b. 1928)
  - Hal Naragon, baseball player (b. 1928)
  - Immanuel Wallerstein, sociologist and developer of the worlds-systems theory (b. 1930)

== September ==
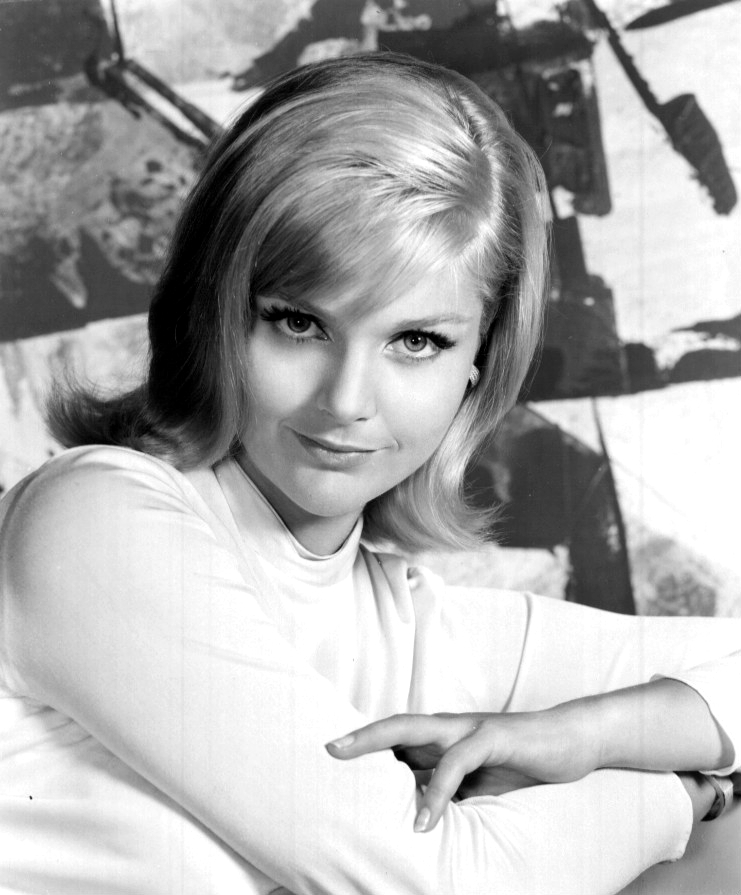
Carol Lynley

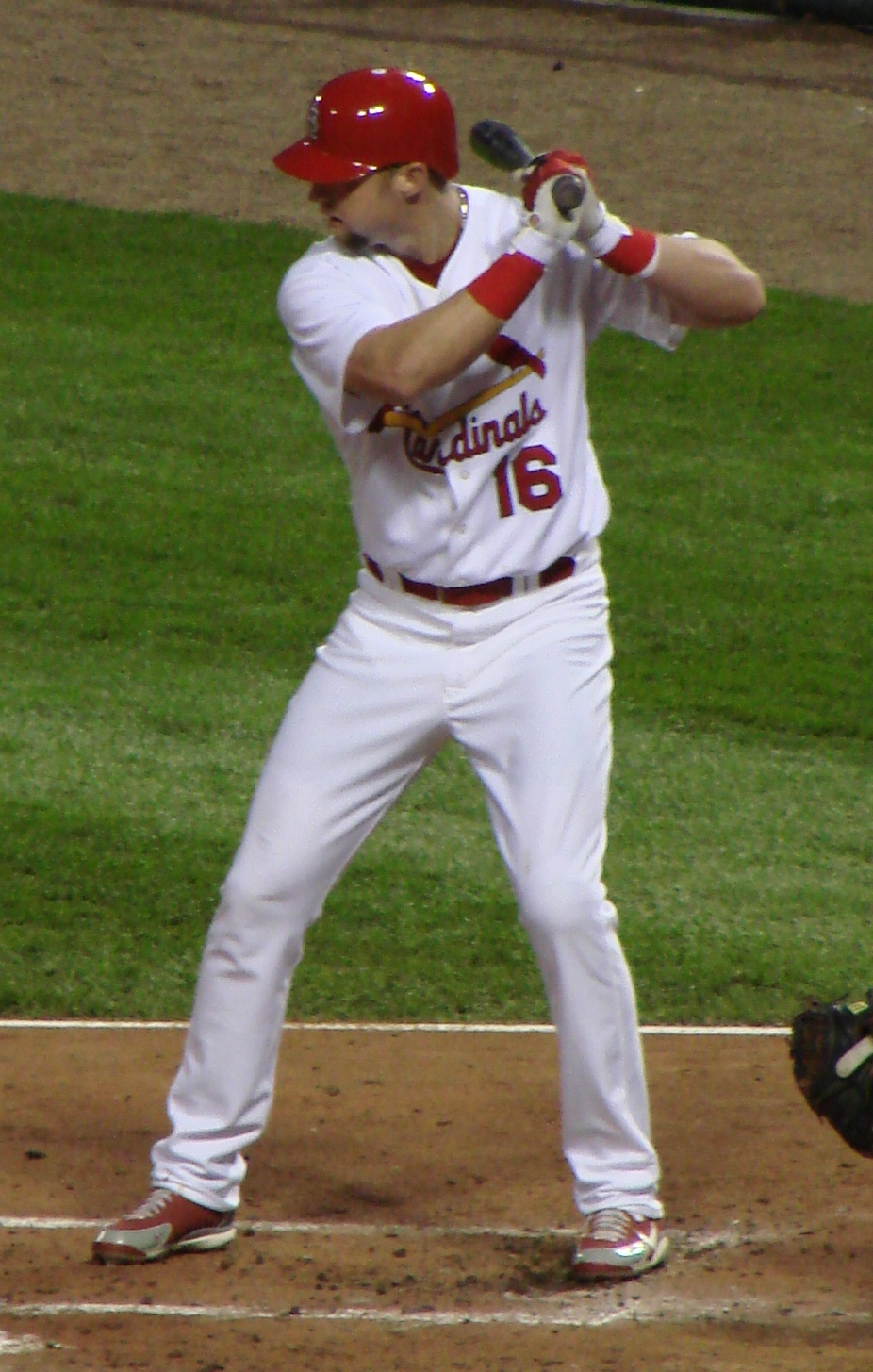
Chris Duncan

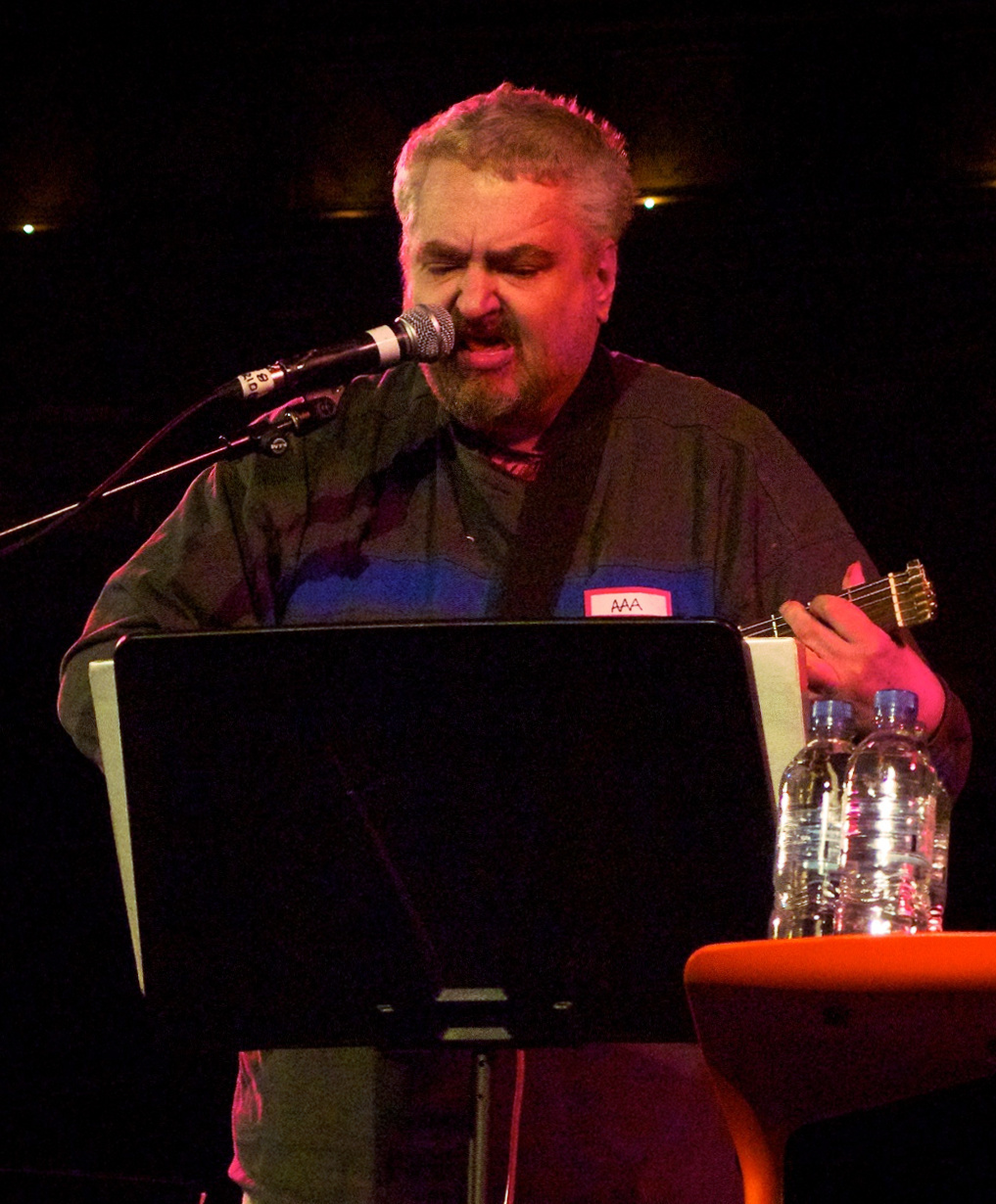
Daniel Johnston

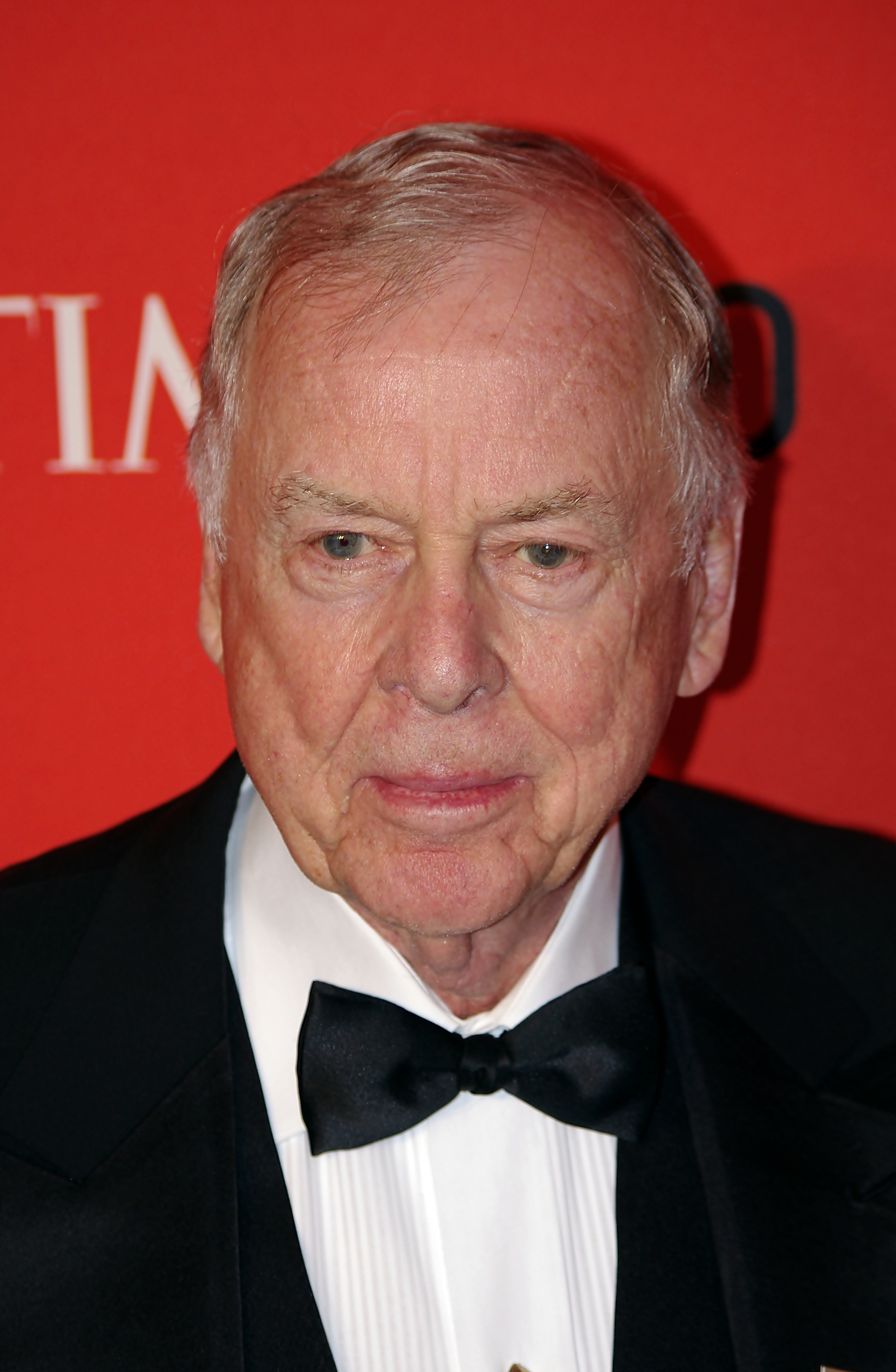
T. Boone Pickens

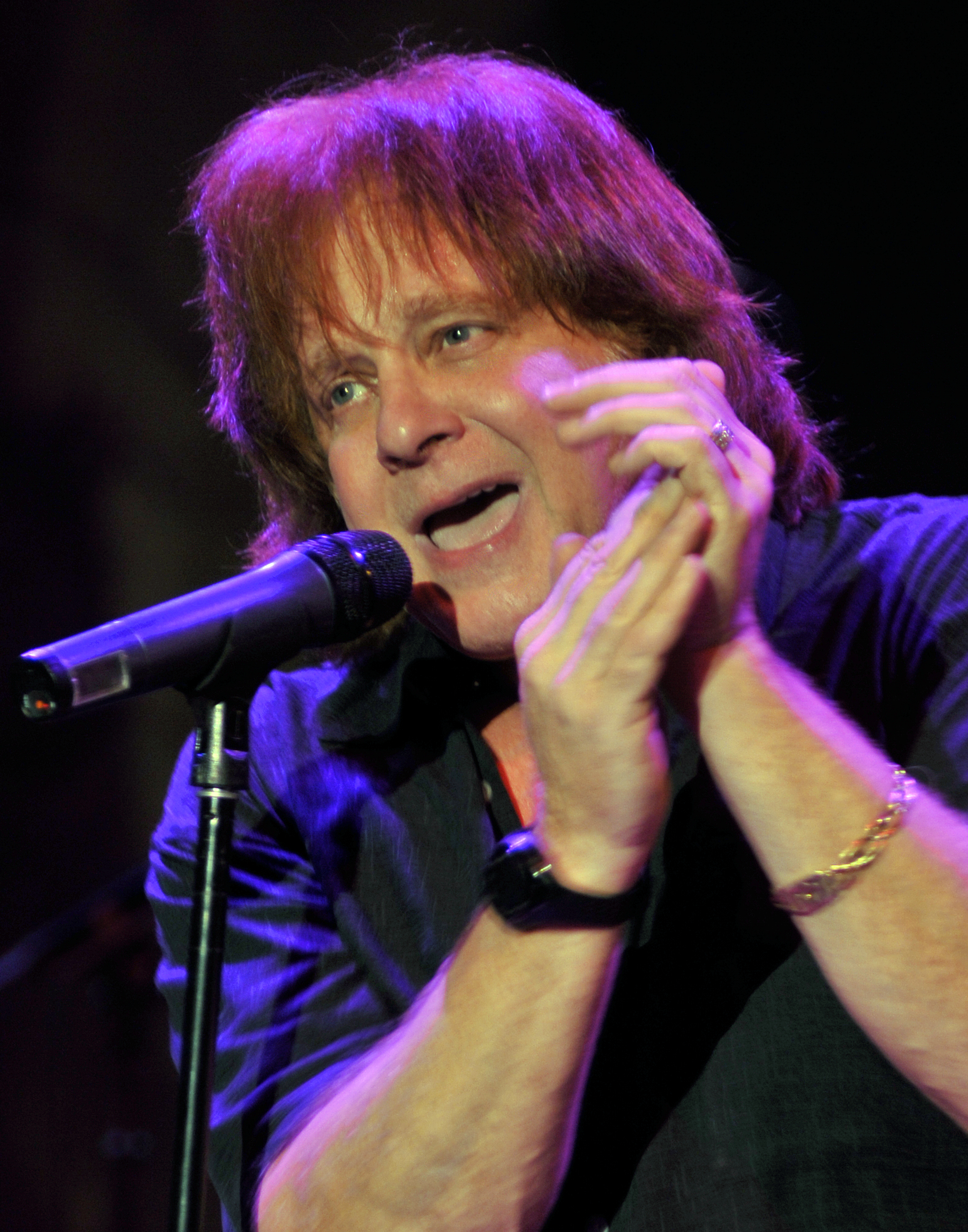
Eddie Money

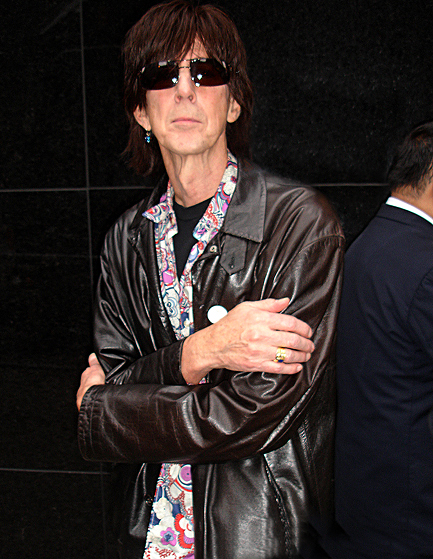
Ric Ocasek

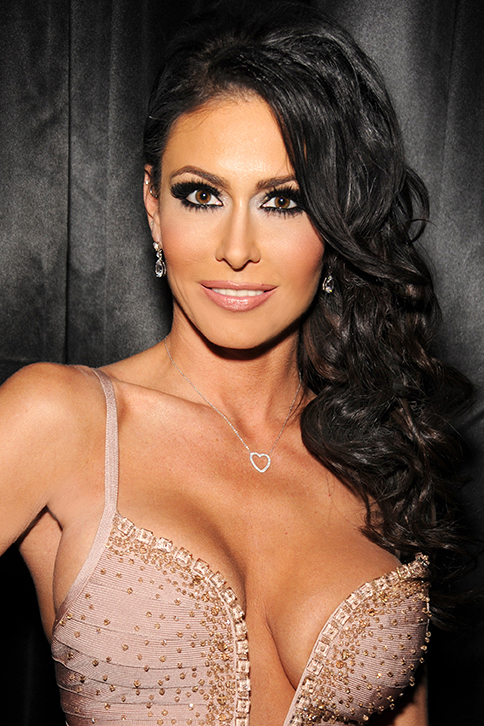
Jessica Jaymes

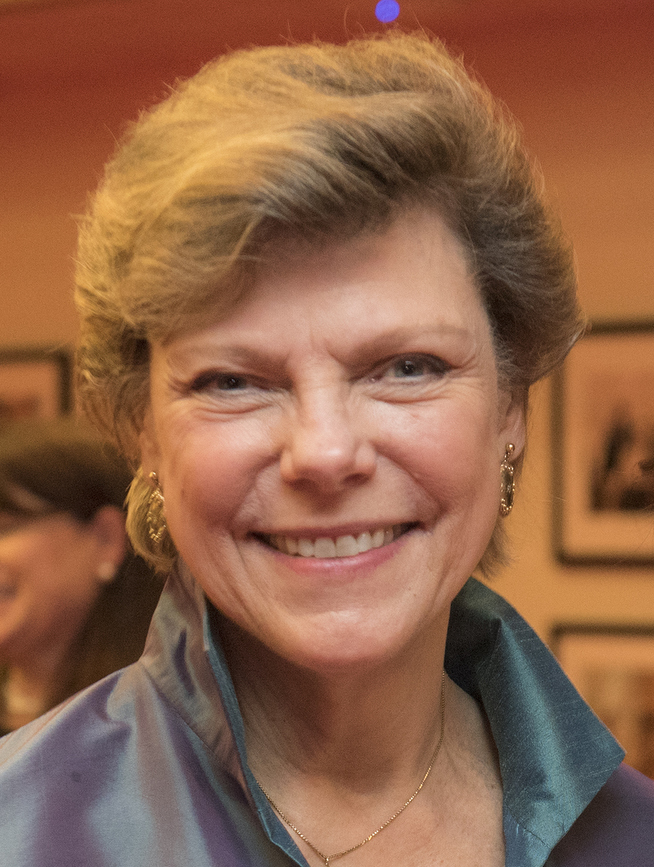
Cokie Roberts

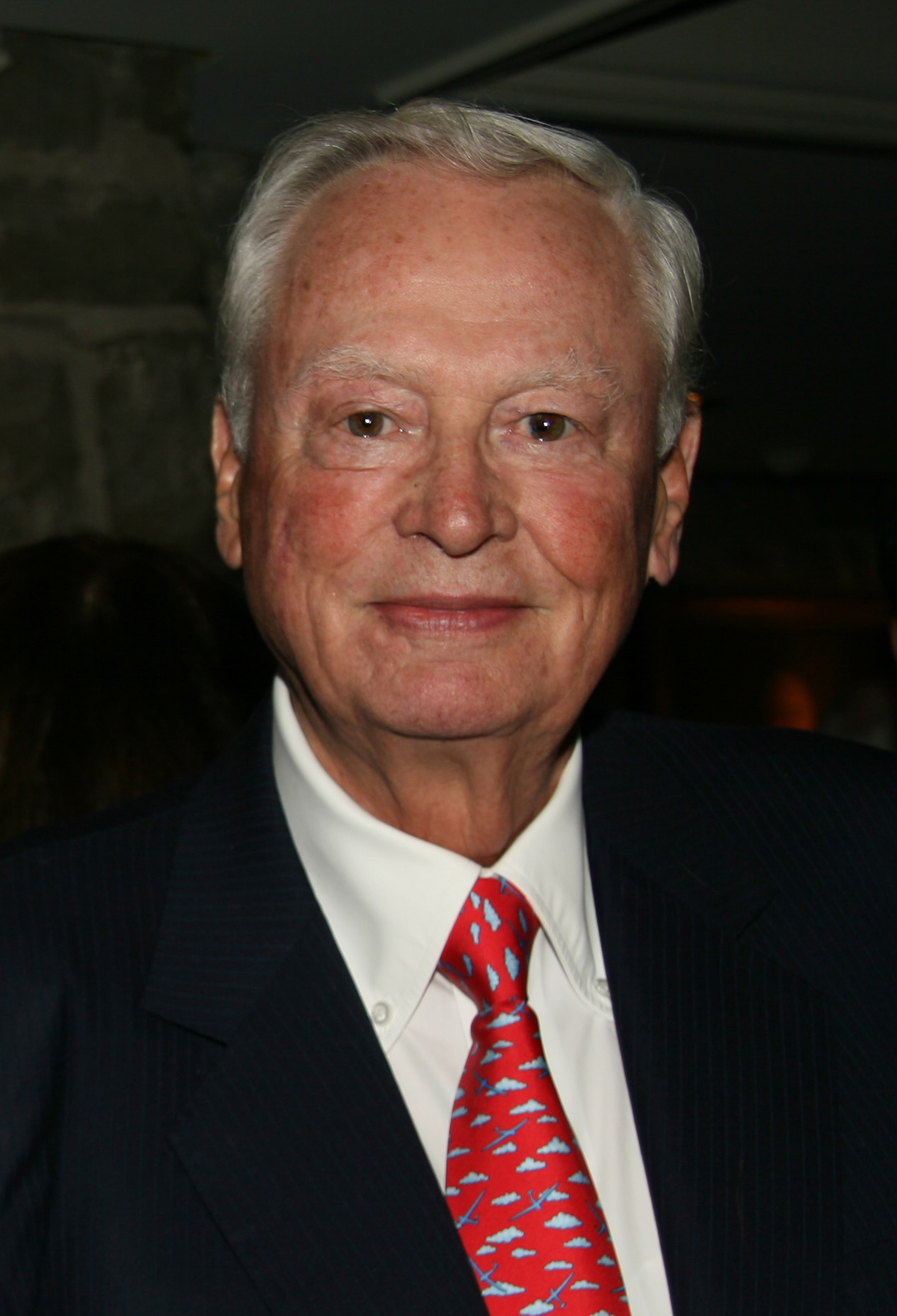
Barron Hilton

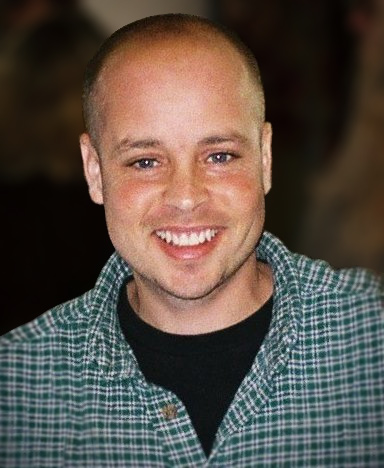
Aron Eisenberg

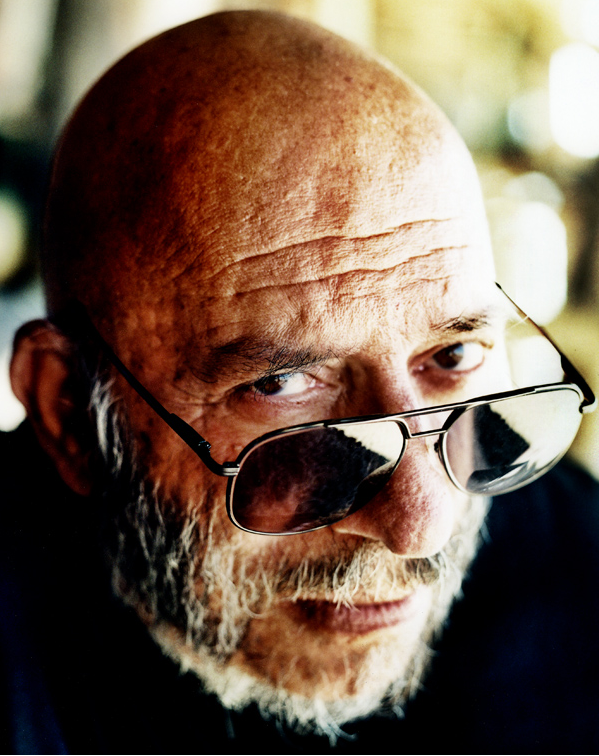
Sid Haig

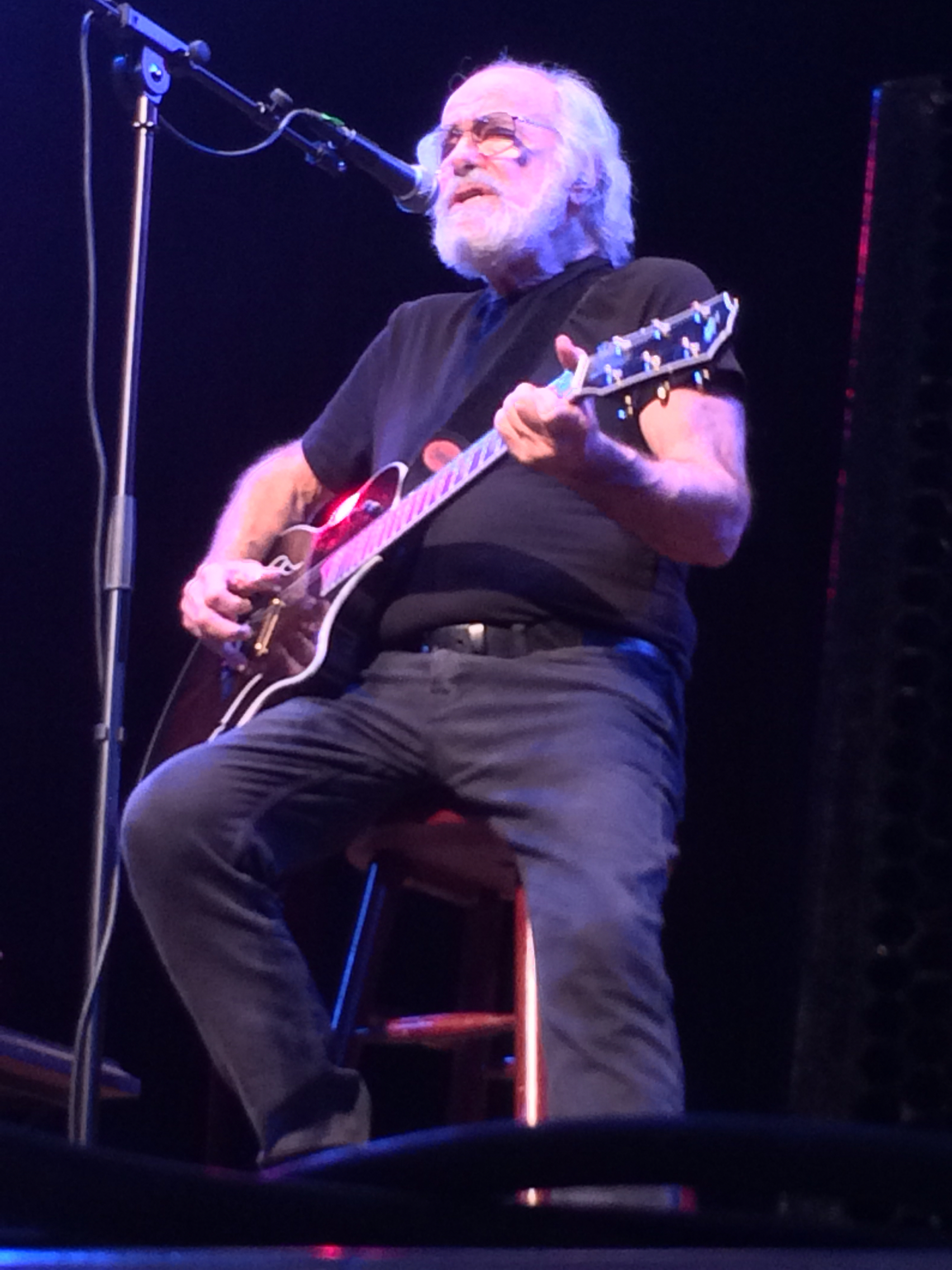
Robert Hunter

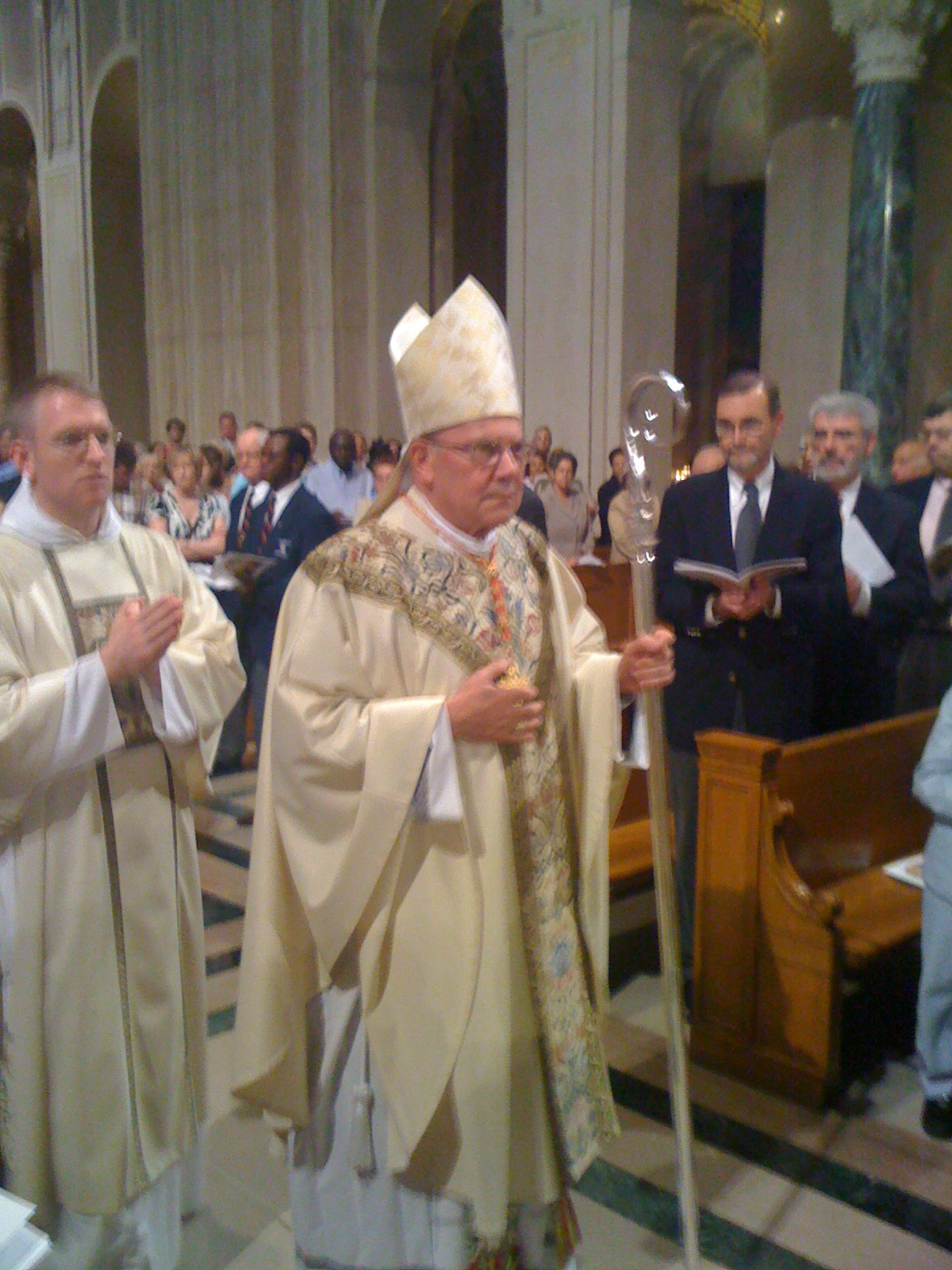
William Levada

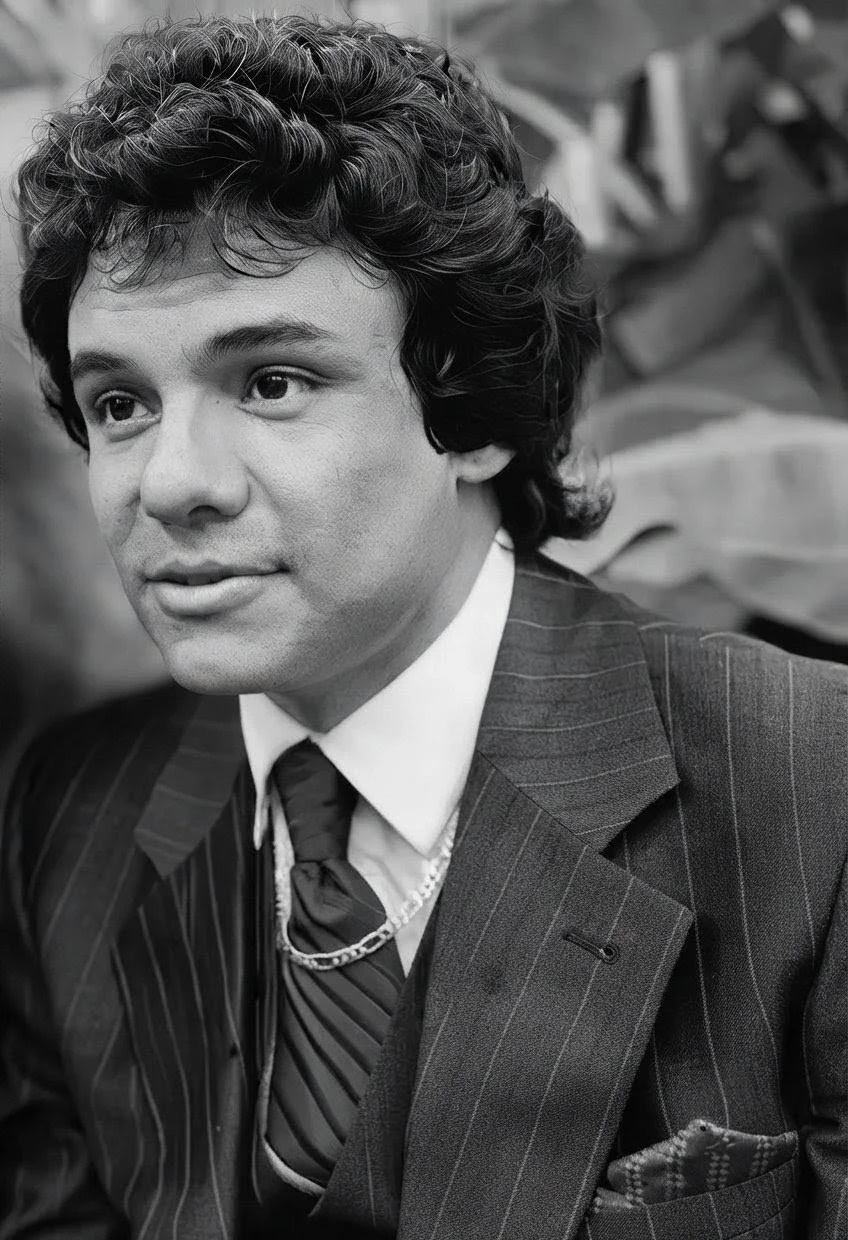
José José

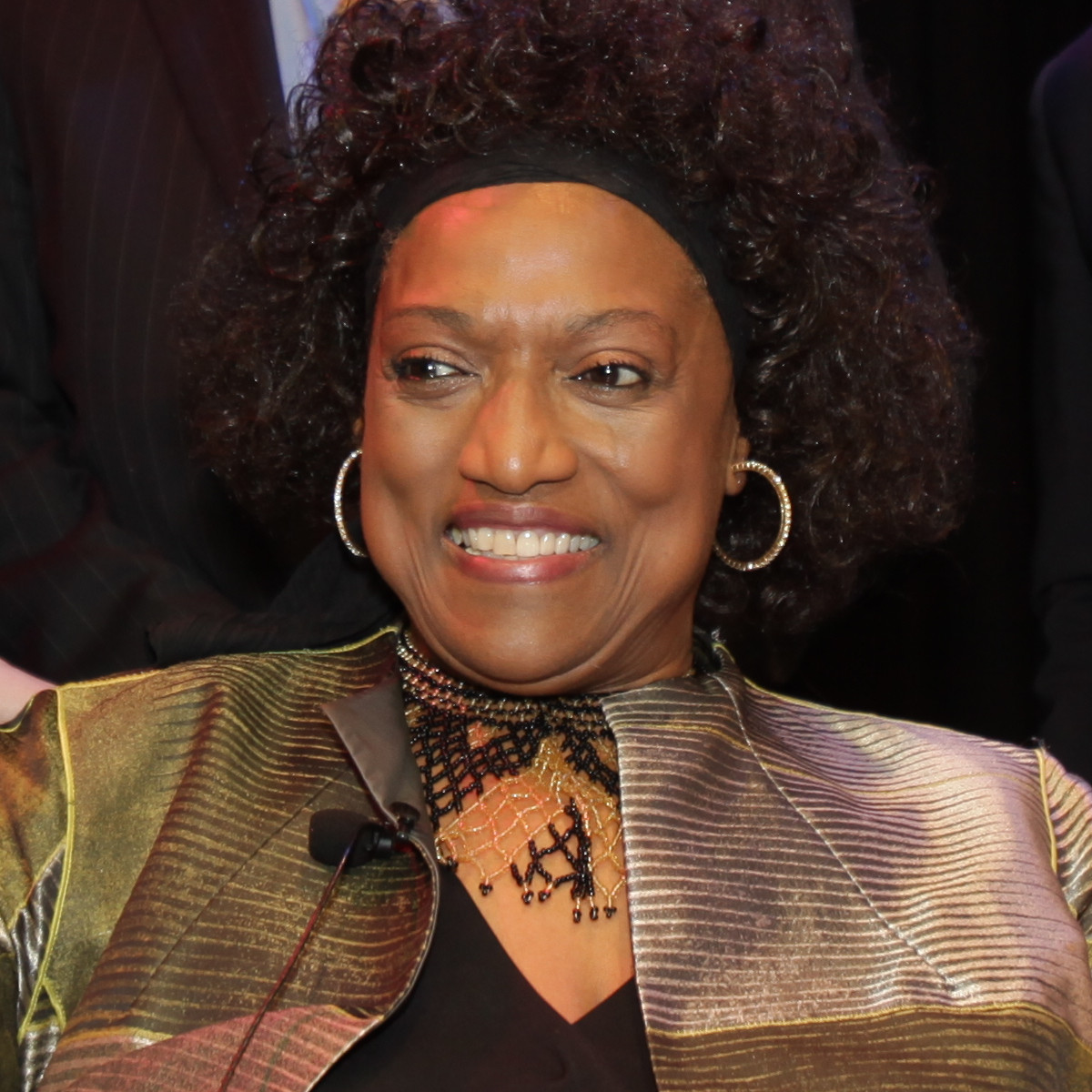
Jessye Norman

- September 1
  - Alison Cheek, Australian-born episcopal priest (b. 1927)
  - Charles W. Daniels, judge (b. 1943)
  - Archbishop Nikon of Boston, Eastern Orthodox prelate (b. 1945)
  - Katherine MacLean, science fiction author (b. 1925)
  - Jean Edward Smith, biographer (b. 1932)
  - Barbara Probst Solomon, author (b. 1928)
- September 2
  - Jack Clay, acting teacher (b. 1926)
  - Dorothea Benton Frank, author (b. 1951)
  - William G. Daughtridge Jr., politician (b. 1952)
  - Frederic Pryor, economist (b. 1933)
- September 3
  - LaShawn Daniels, songwriter (b. 1977)
  - George Klopfer, physician (b. 1940)
  - Carol Lynley, actress (b. 1942)
- September 4
  - James Atlas, writer, editor, and publisher (b. 1949)
  - Kylie Rae Harris, country singer-songwriter (b. 1989)
  - Stuart B. Levy, microbiologist (b. 1938)
  - Dan Warner, singer-songwriter and musician (b. 1970)
- September 5
  - Charlie Cole, photojournalist (b. 1955)
  - Jimmy Johnson, guitarist and record producer (b. 1943)
  - Chris March, fashion designer (b. 1963)
  - Tom Phoebus, baseball player (b. 1942)
  - Bob Rule, basketball player (b. 1944)
  - Wally Westlake, baseball player (b. 1920)
- September 6
  - Chris Duncan, baseball player (b. 1981)
  - Leonard W. Moore, chief executive (b. 1933)
- September 7
  - Robert Axelrod, voice actor (b. 1949)
  - Al Carmichael, football player and stunt performer (b. 1928)
  - Peter van Dijk, architect (b. 1929)
  - James Robertson, judge (b. 1938)
  - Charlie Silvera, baseball player (b. 1924)
  - Guy Travaglio, politician (b. 1926)
  - John Wesley, actor (b. 1947)
- September 8
  - Marca Bristo, disability rights activist (b. 1953)
  - David Hagberg, novelist (b. 1942)
  - Susan Kamil, book publisher and editor (b. 1949)
  - Joseph P. Kolter, politician (b. 1926)
  - Jane Mead, poet (b. 1958)
- September 9
  - Jim Archer, baseball pitcher (b. 1932)
  - Neiron Ball, football player (b. 1992)
  - Robert Frank, Swiss-born photographer (b. 1924)
  - Jim Greengrass, baseball player (b. 1927)
  - Joe Keough, baseball player (b. 1946)
  - Fred McLeod, sportscaster (b. 1952)
  - Jarrid Wilson, pastor and writer (b. 1988)
- September 10
  - Betty Corwin, theatre archivist (b. 1920)
  - Sam Davis, football player (b. 1944)
  - Jeff Fenholt, singer, actor, and evangelist (b. 1950)
  - Ariel Hollinshead, pharmacologist (b. 1929)
  - Robert N. McClelland, surgeon (b. 1929)
  - Billy Stacy, football player (b. 1936)
- September 11
  - Daniel Johnston, singer-songwriter (b. 1961)
  - Annette Kolodny, feminist literary critic (b. 1941)
  - Mardik Martin, Iranian-born Iraqi-American screenwriter (b. 1934)
  - T. Boone Pickens, businessman and philanthropist (b. 1928)
  - Terrell Roberts, football player (b. 1981)
  - Joe Scudero, football player (b. 1930)
  - Anne Rivers Siddons, novelist (b. 1936)
- September 12
  - Juanita Abernathy, civil rights activist (b. 1931)
  - Ruth Abrams, judge (b. 1930)
  - Michael E. Haynes, minister and politician (b. 1927)
  - I. Beverly Lake Jr., jurist (b. 1934)
  - Francis Xavier Roque, Roman Catholic prelate (b. 1928)
  - Bill Schelly, writer (b. 1951)
  - Martin Trust, business person, entrepreneur and father of Sri Lankan apparel industry (b. 1934)
- September 13
  - Mary Anne Frey, aerospace physician (b. 1934)
  - Alex Grammas, baseball player (b. 1926)
  - Joachim Messing, German-born biologist (b. 1946)
  - Eddie Money, singer, songwriter and multi-instrumentalist (b. 1949)
  - Joseph Peter Wilson, cross-country skier (b. 1935)
- September 14
  - Gene Bacque, baseball player (b. 1937)
  - Larry Garron, football player (b. 1937)
  - Edmund Jones, politician (b. 1918)
  - John Ralston, football coach (b. 1927)
  - Tom Waddell, Scottish-born baseball player (b. 1958)
- September 15
  - Mark von Hagen, military historian (b. 1954)
  - Phyllis Newman, actress and singer (b. 1933)
  - Arthur Nims, federal judge (b. 1923)
  - Ric Ocasek, singer, songwriter, record producer, and frontman for The Cars (b. 1944)
  - Mike Stefanik, racing driver (b. 1958)
  - Azellia White, aviator (b. 1913)
- September 16
  - Anthony Bucco, politician (b. 1938)
  - Henry Buttelmann, fighter pilot (b. 1929)
  - John Cohen, folk musician and musicologist (b. 1932)
  - Steve Dalachinsky, poet (b. 1946)
  - Paul Ingrassia, journalist (b. 1950)
  - Ira A. Lipman, businessman and philanthropist (b. 1940)
  - Eric Woodfin Naylor, hispanist, scholar and educator (b. 1936)
  - Sander Vanocur, journalist (b. 1928)
- September 17
  - Carlos Cisneros, politician (b. 1948)
  - Jessica Jaymes, pornographic actress (b. 1976)
  - Harold Mabern, jazz pianist and composer (b. 1936)
  - Cokie Roberts, journalist and author (b. 1943)
  - Suzanne Whang, actress (b. 1962)
- September 18
  - Chuck Dauphin, music journalist (b. 1974)
  - Richard Watson, philosopher and speleologist (b. 1931)
- September 19
  - Maurice Ferré, Puerto Rican-born politician (b. 1935)
  - Barron Hilton, businessman and philanthropist (b. 1927)
  - Sol Stein, publisher (b. 1926)
  - Peppers Pride, thoroughbred racehorse (b. 2003)
- September 20
  - Robert Boyd, journalist and bureau chief (b. 1928)
  - Howard Cassady, football player (b. 1934)
  - Jan Merlin, actor (b. 1925)
  - Eric Samuelson, playwright (b. 1956)
  - Yonrico Scott, drummer (b. 1955)
- September 21
  - Tommy Brooker, football player (b. 1939)
  - Napoleon Chagnon, anthropologist (b. 1938)
  - Jack Donner, actor (b. 1928)
  - Aron Eisenberg, actor (b. 1969)
  - Sid Haig, actor (b. 1939)
  - E. J. Holub, football player (b. 1938)
  - George Lardner, journalist (b. 1934)
  - Jarred Rome, Olympic discus thrower (b. 1976)
  - Christopher Rouse, composer (b. 1949)
  - Carl Ruiz, chef and restaurateur (b. 1975)
  - Jevan Snead, football player (b. 1987)
  - Shuping Wang, Chinese-born medical researcher and public health whistleblower (b. 1959)
- September 22
  - Rosemarie Burian, humanitarian (b. 1936)
  - Wally Chambers, football player (b. 1951)
  - Courtney Cox Cole, basketball player (b. 1971)
  - Harry Joseph Flynn, Roman Catholic prelate (b. 1933)
  - J. Michael Mendel, television producer (b. 1964)
- September 23
  - Andre Emmett, basketball player (b. 1982)
  - Robert Hunter, lyricist, singer-songwriter, translator and poet (b. 1941)
  - Joan Petersilia, criminologist (b. 1951)
  - Gordon C. Stauffer, college basketball coach (b. 1930)
  - Robert Zelnick, journalist (b. 1940)
- September 24
  - Mordicai Gerstein, children's writer and illustrator (b. 1935)
  - Jimmy Nelson, ventriloquist (b. 1928)
  - Donald L. Tucker, politician (b. 1935)
  - Roger H. Zion, politician (b. 1921)
- September 25
  - Michael D. Coe, archaeologist and anthropologist (b. 1929)
  - Linda Porter, actress (b. 1933)
  - Libi Staiger, actress (b. 1928)
- September 26
  - Plato Cacheris, lawyer (b. 1929)
  - Mac Conner, commercial illustrator (b. 1913)
  - William Levada, Roman Catholic prelate (b. 1936)
  - Ronald L. Schlicher, diplomat (b. 1956)
- September 27
  - Rudy Behlmer, film historian (b. 1926)
  - Jack Edwards, politician (b. 1928)
  - Rob Garrison, actor (b. 1960)
  - John Francis Kinney, Roman Catholic prelate (b. 1937)
  - Gene Melchiorre, basketball player (b. 1927)
  - Inder Singh, human rights activist (b. 1932)
  - John J. Snyder, Roman Catholic prelate (b. 1925)
  - Jimmy Spicer, rapper and record producer (b. 1958)
  - Joseph C. Wilson, diplomat and writer (b. 1949)
- September 28
  - José José, Mexican singer and actor (b. 1948)
  - Hogan Sheffer, television writer (b. 1958)
- September 29
  - Martin Bernheimer, music critic (b. 1936)
  - busbee, musician, songwriter, and record producer (b. 1976)
  - Neil D. Van Sickle, air force major general (b. 1915)
  - Larry Willis, jazz pianist (b. 1942)
- September 30
  - Marshall Efron, actor and humorist (b. 1938)
  - Wayne Fitzgerald, film and television title designer (b. 1930)
  - Shinya Inoué, Japanese-born American scientist (b. 1921)
  - Sharon Malcolm, politician (b. 1947)
  - Jessye Norman, operatic soprano (b. 1945)
  - Pete Turnham, politician (b. 1920)

== October ==
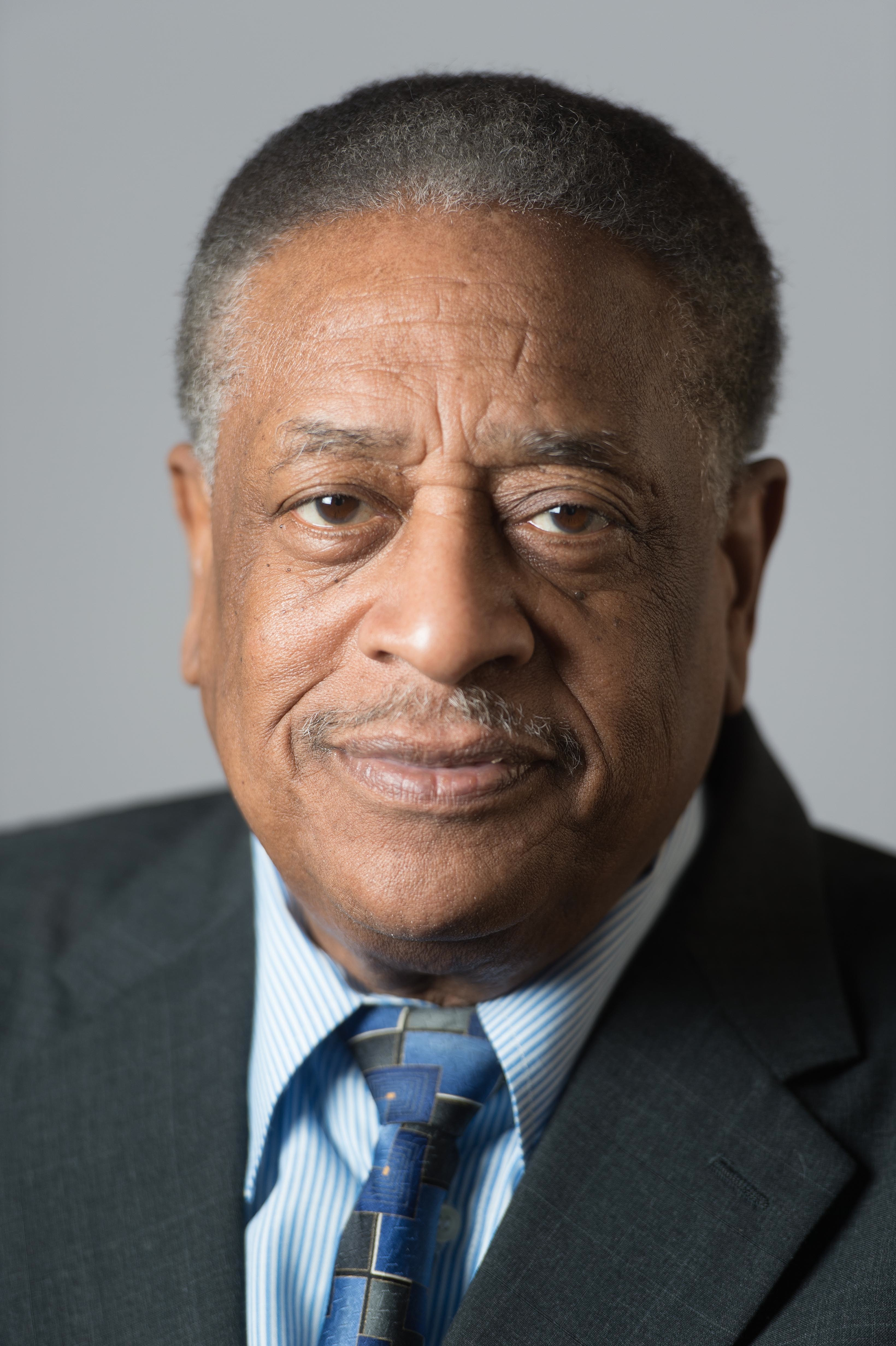
Cain Hope Felder

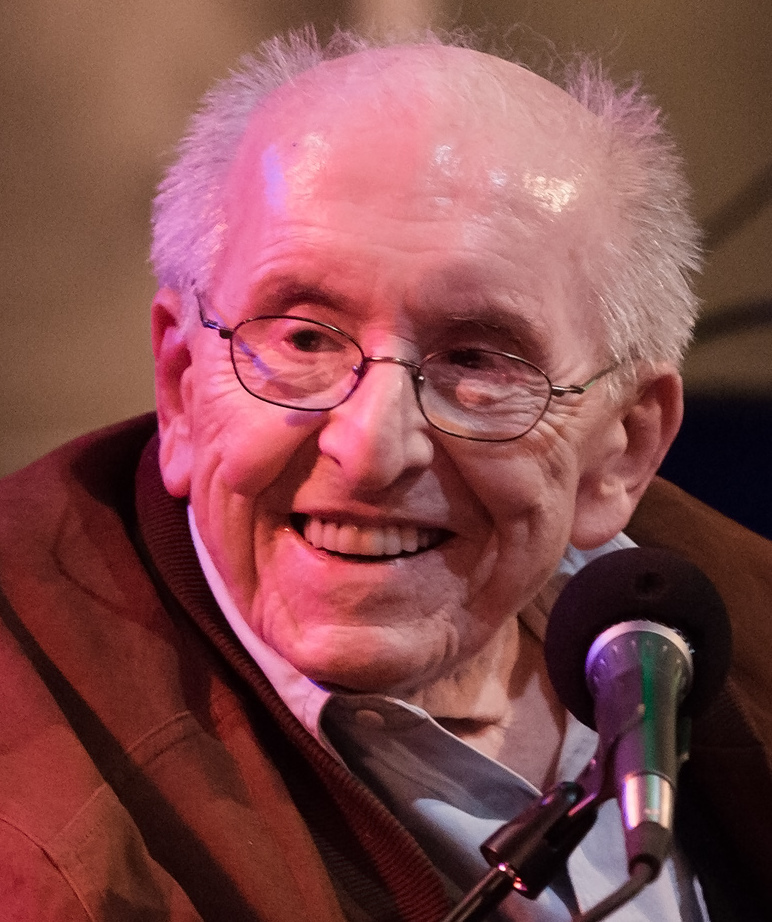
Eric Pleskow

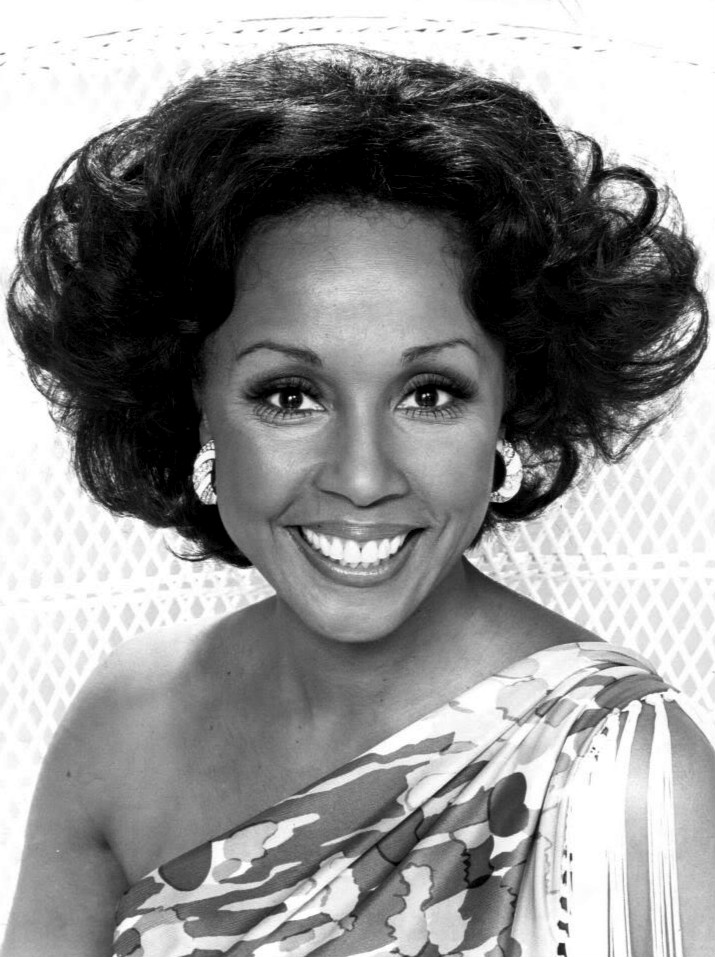
Diahann Carroll

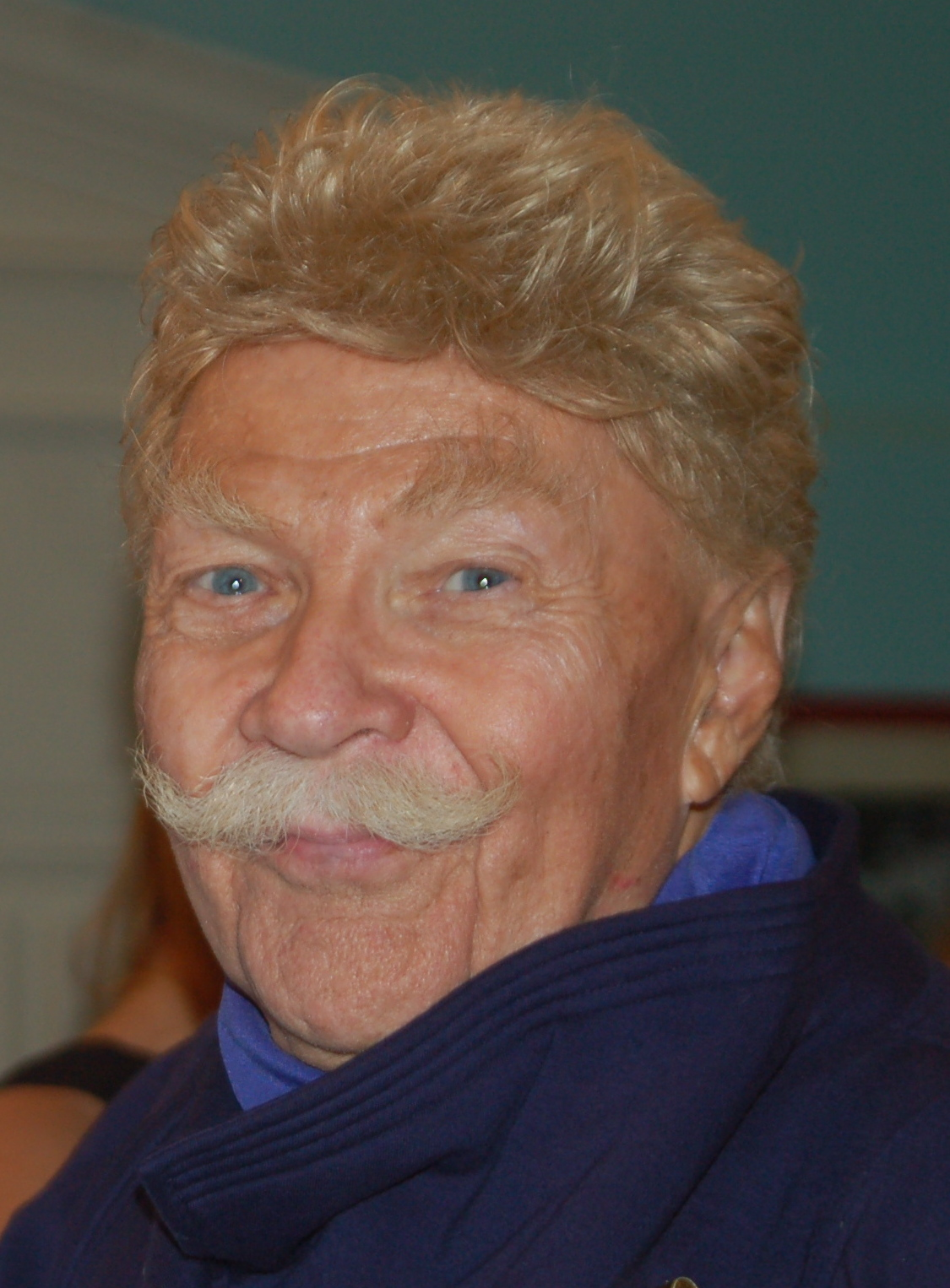
Rip Taylor

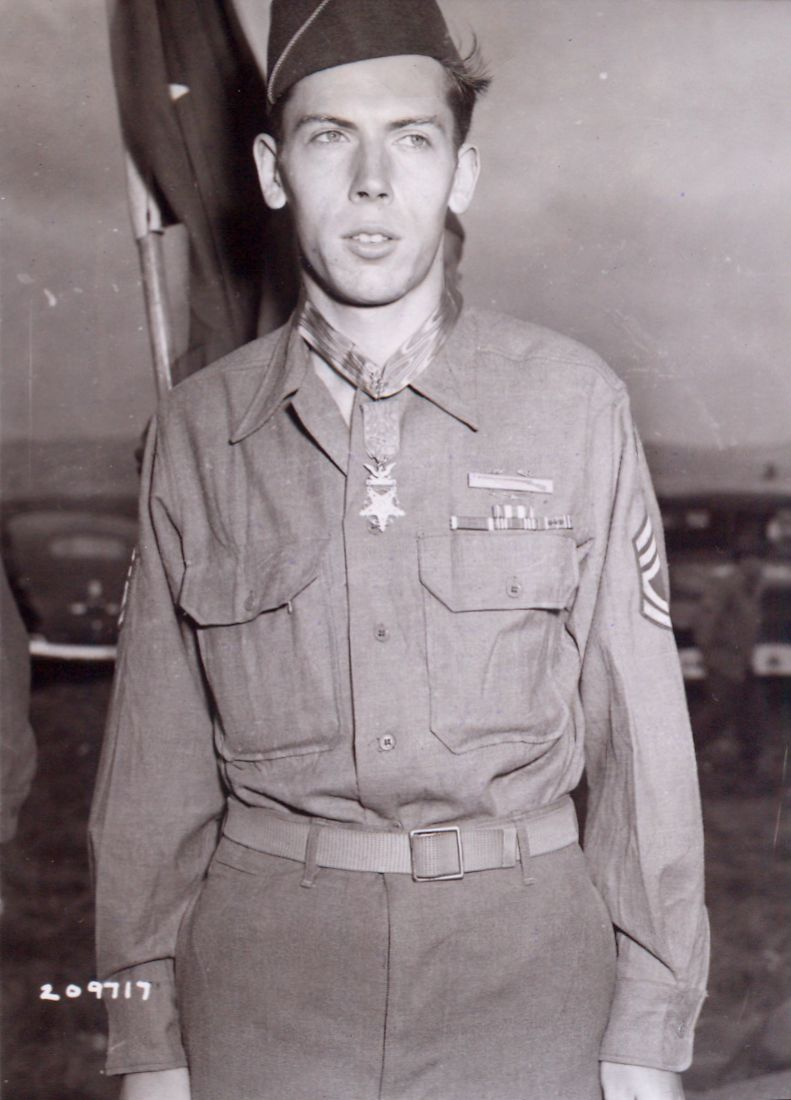
Francis S. Currey

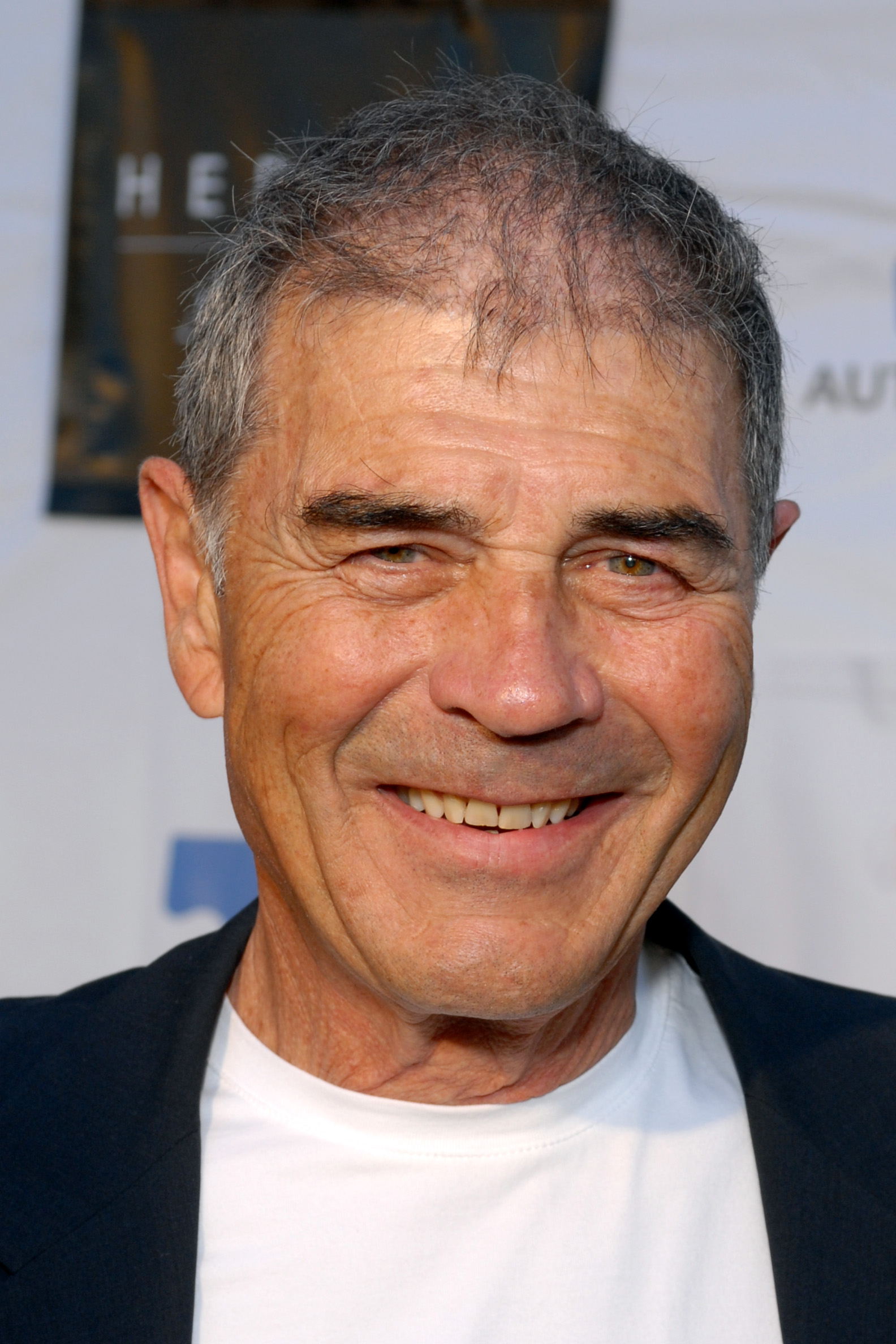
Robert Forster

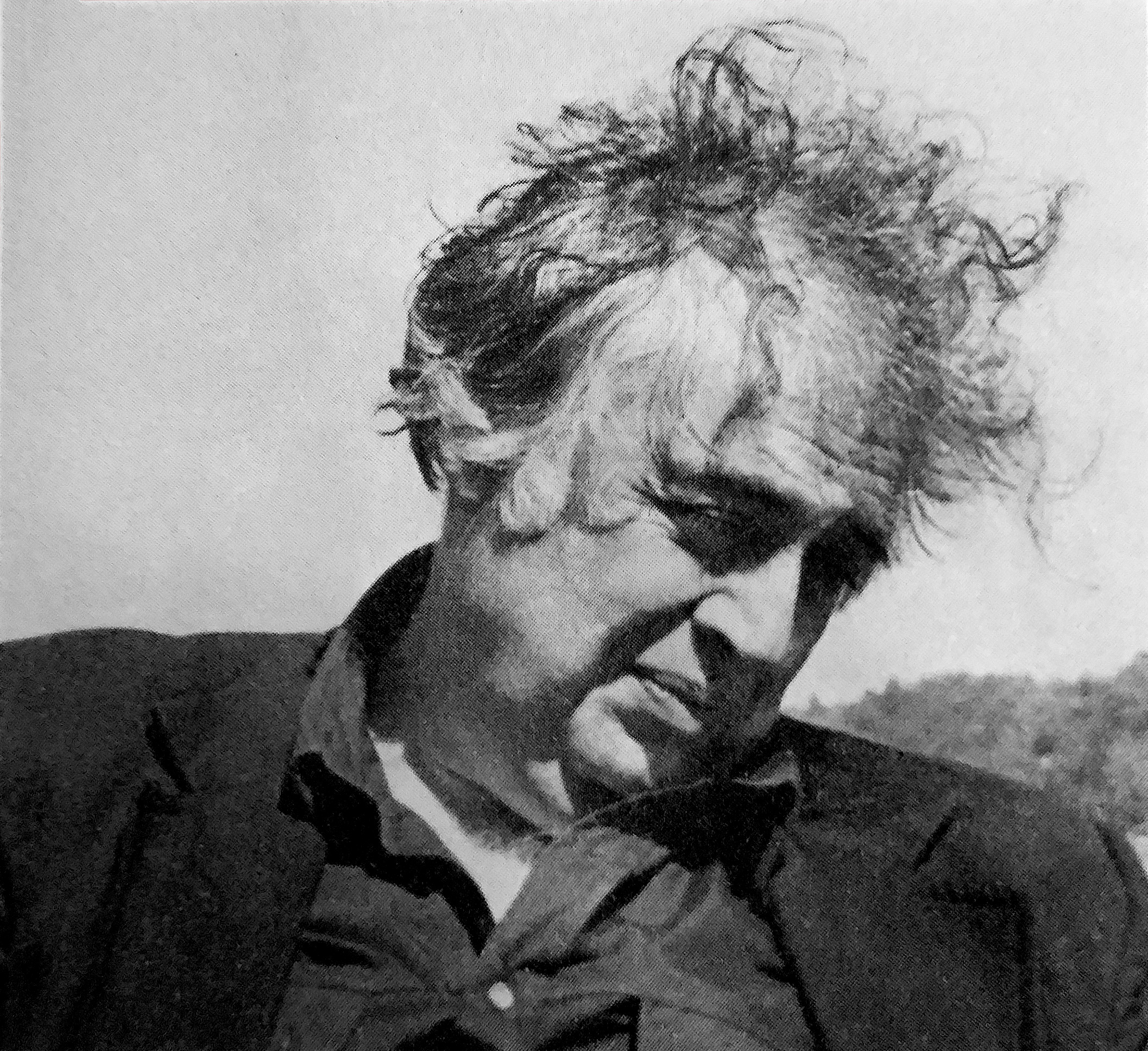
Harold Bloom

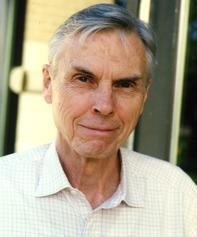
John Tate

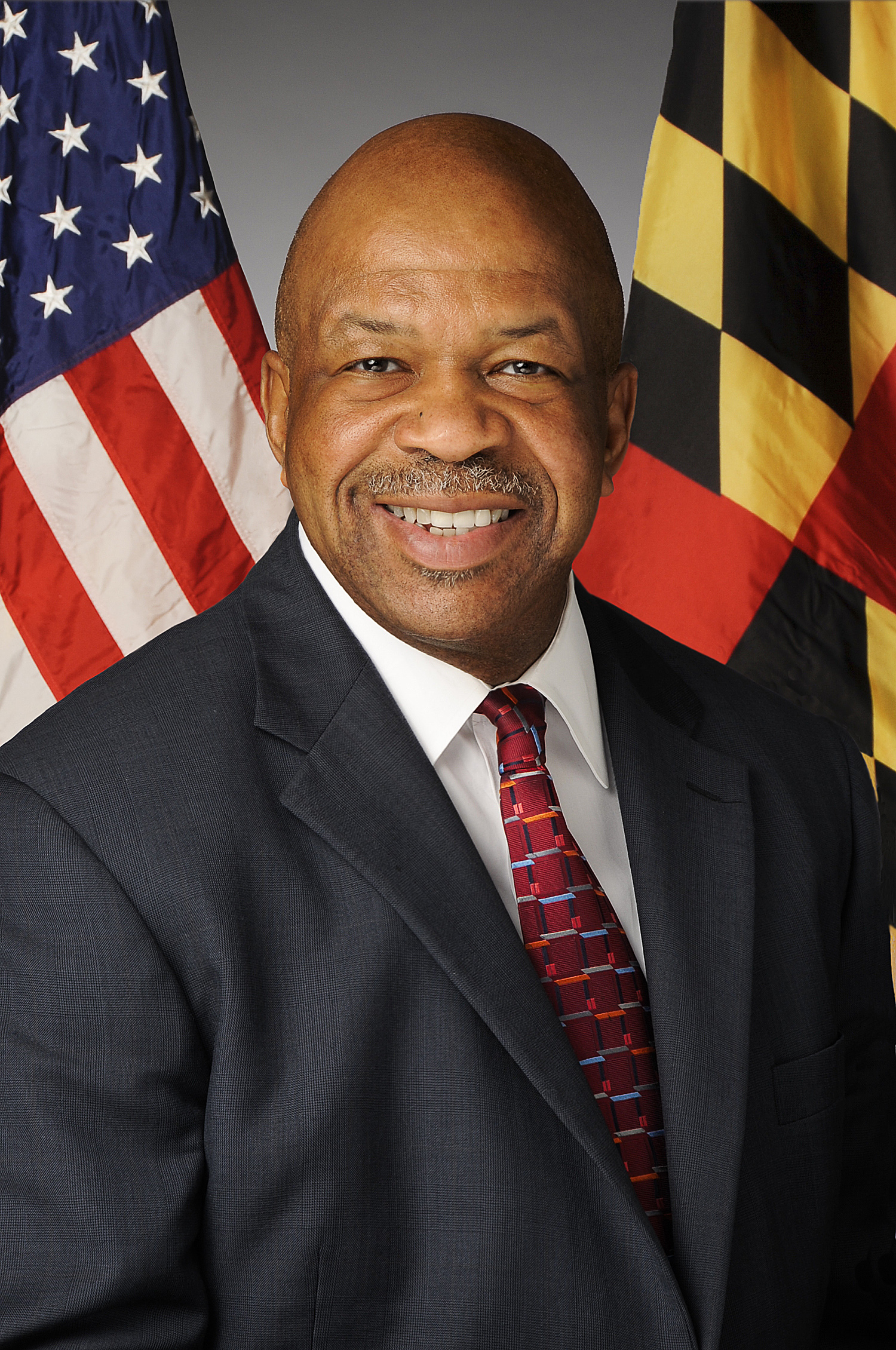
Elijah Cummings

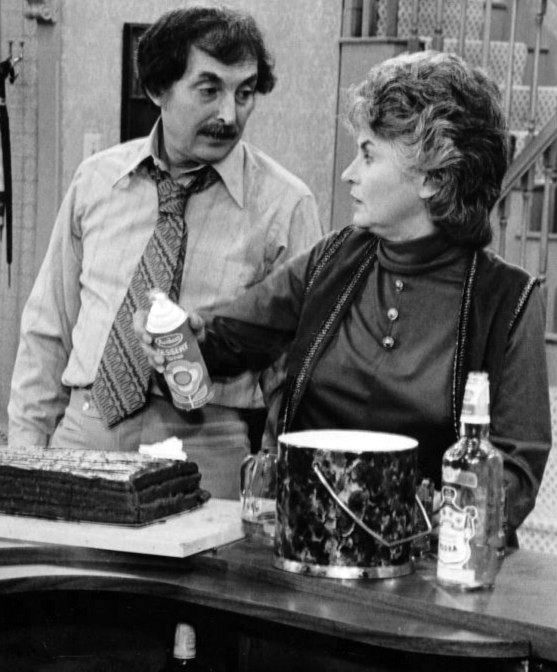
Bill Macy

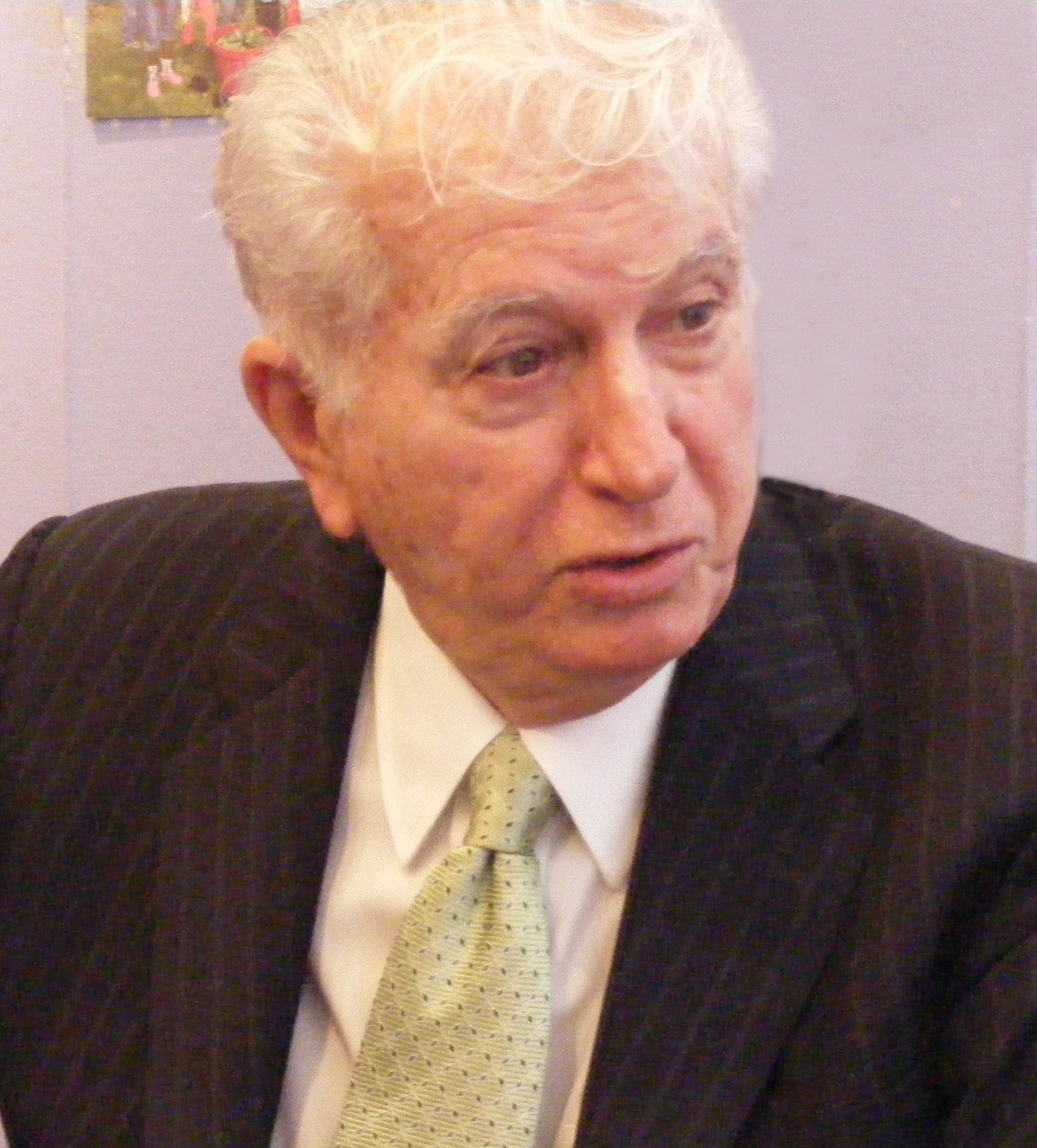
Thomas D'Alesandro III

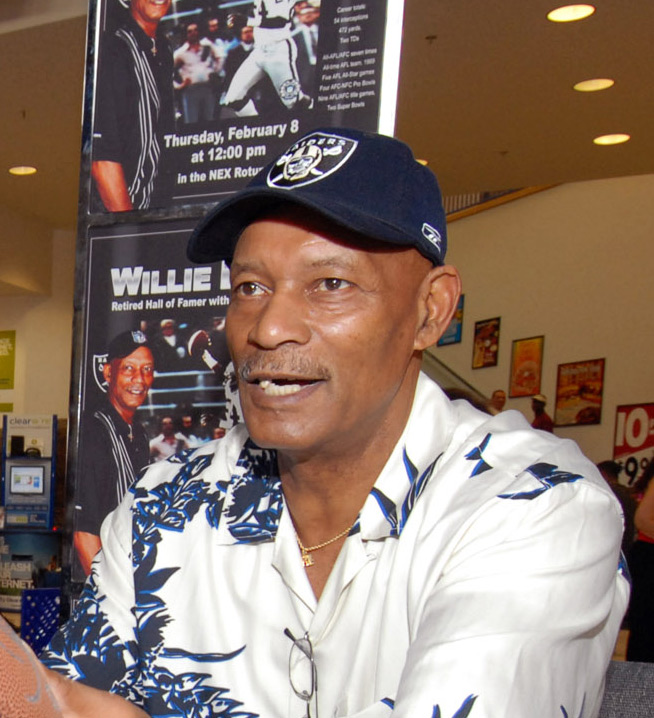
Willie Brown

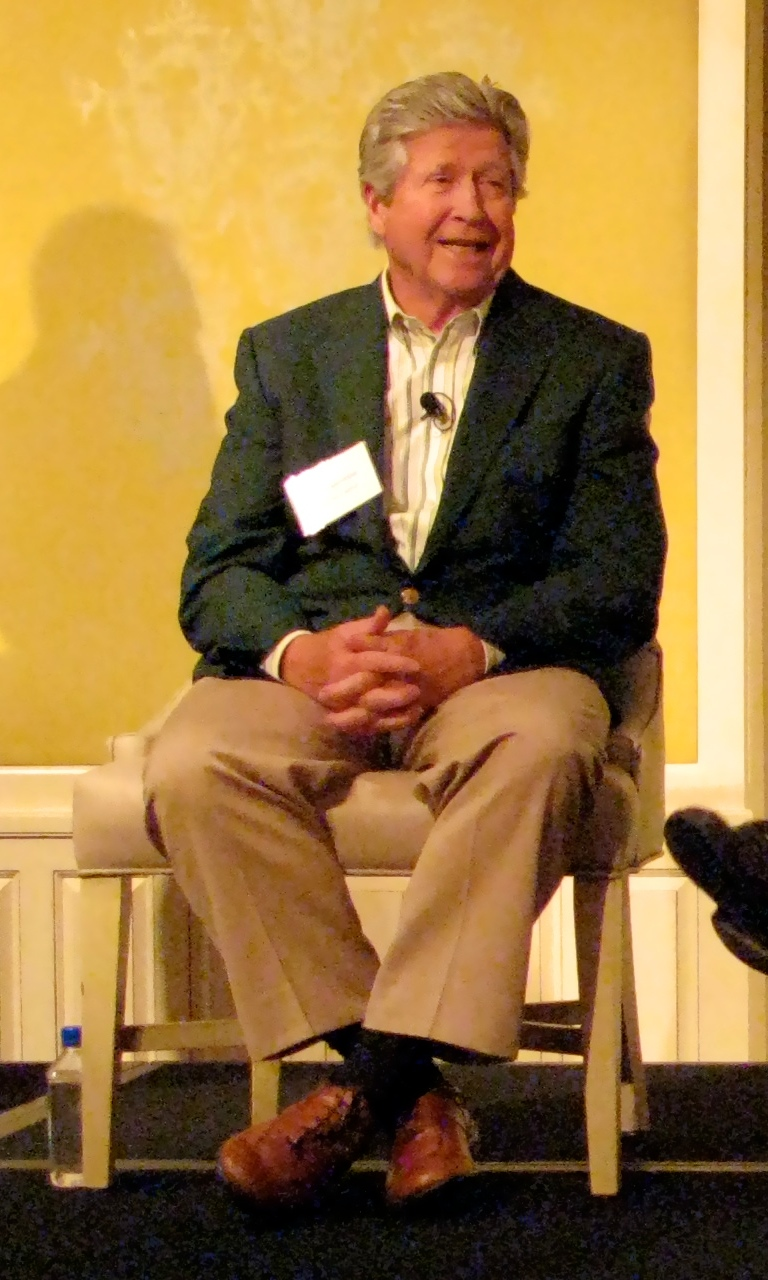
Don Valentine

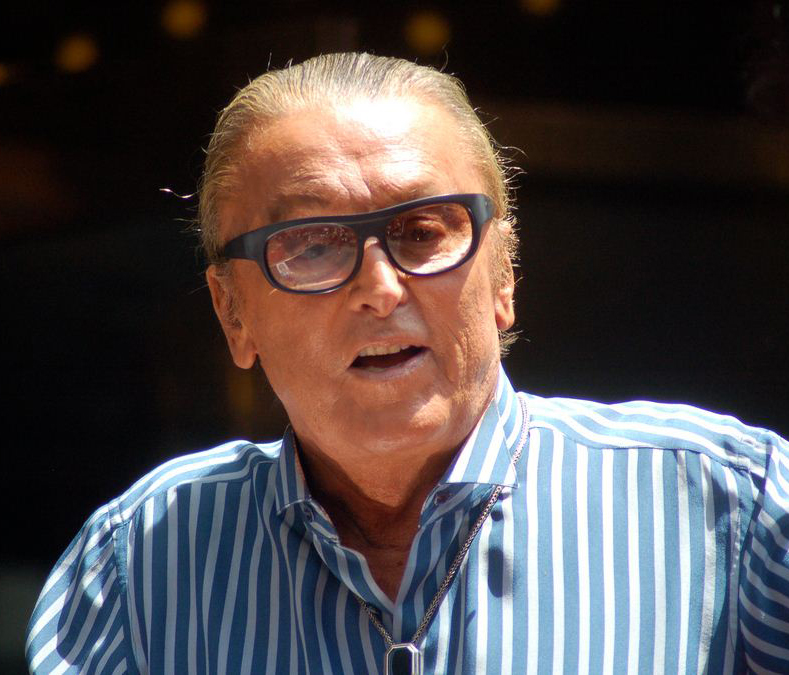
Robert Evans

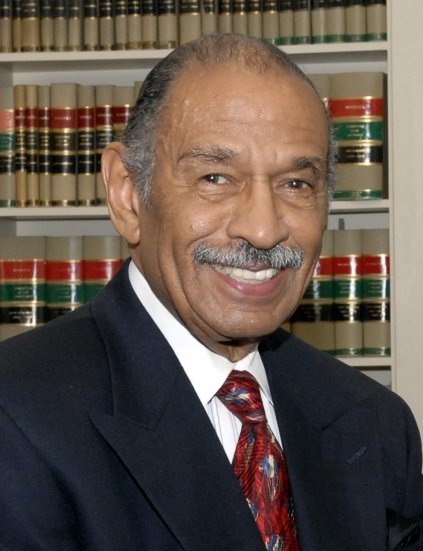
John Conyers

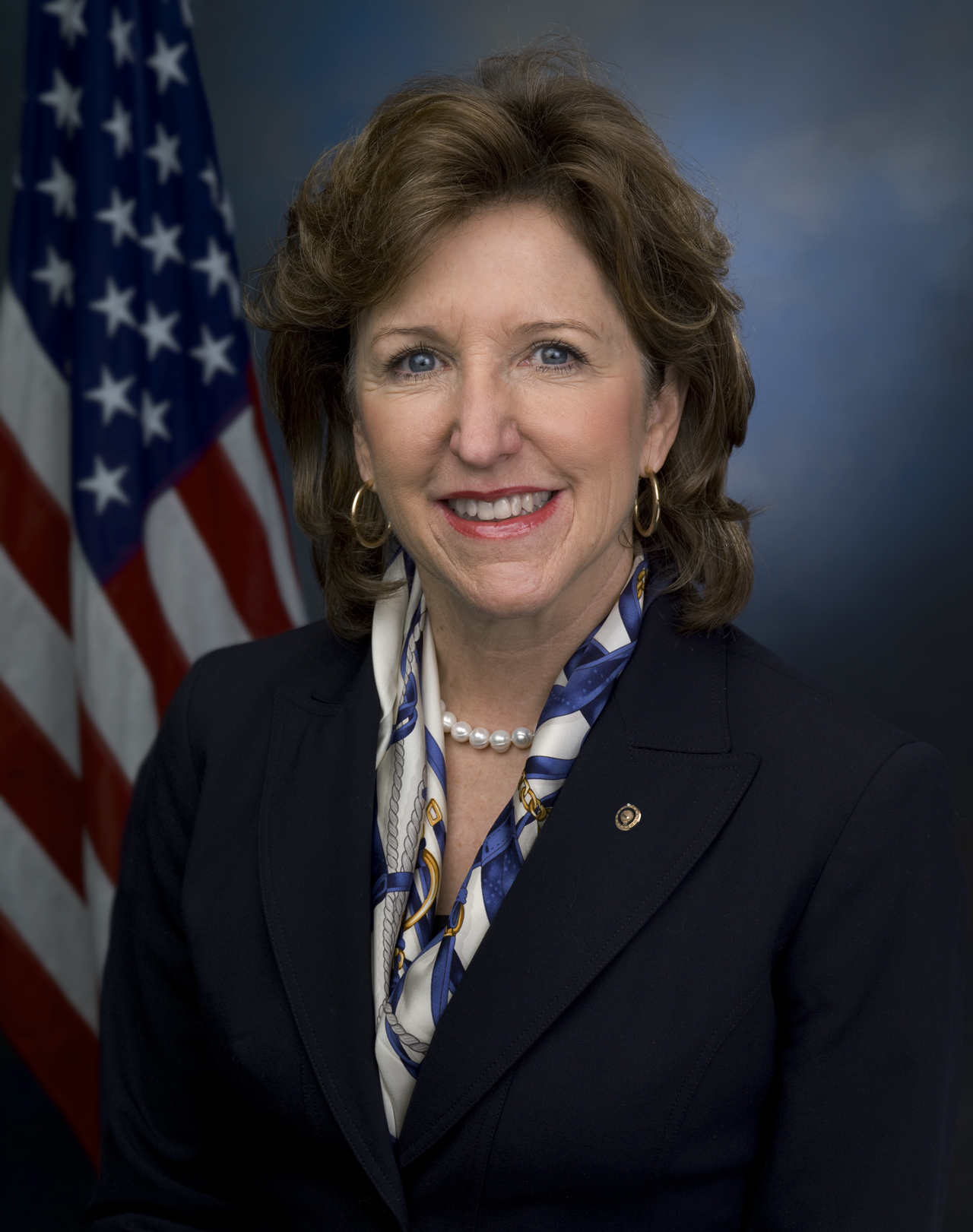
Kay Hagan

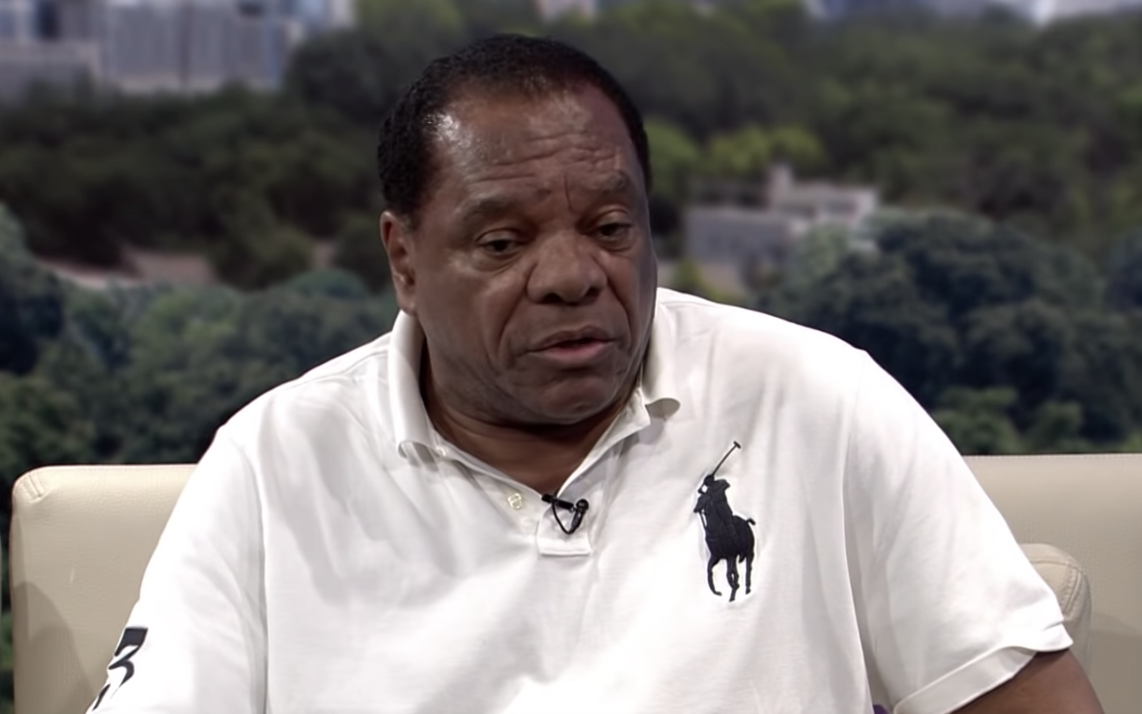
John Witherspoon

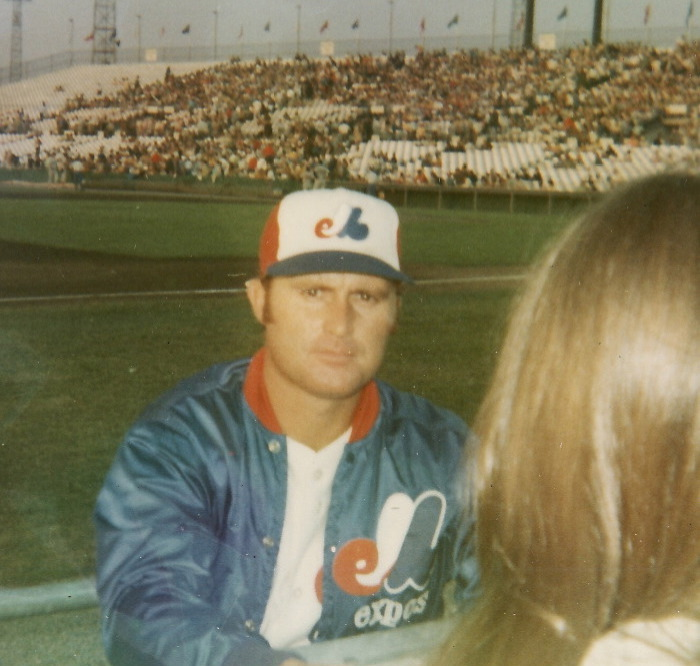
Ron Fairly

- October 1
  - Cain Hope Felder, Methodist minister and biblical scholar (b. 1943)
  - Eric Pleskow, Austrian-born American film producer (b. 1924)
  - Ed Simonini, football player (b. 1954)
  - Dick Soash, politician (b. 1941)
  - Ruben A. Valdez, politician (b. 1937)
  - Beverly Watkins, blues guitarist (b. 1939)
- October 2
  - Michael Bauman, theologian (b. 1950)
  - Bill Bidwill, football team owner (b. 1931)
  - Julie Gibson, actress and singer (b. 1913)
  - John Kirby, attorney (b. 1939)
  - Beth Palmer, bridge player (b. 1952)
  - Kim Shattuck, singer-songwriter and guitarist (b. 1963)
  - Alan Zaslove, animator (b. 1927)
  - Ezra Zilkha, financier and philanthropist (b. 1925)
- October 3
  - Vinnie Bell, inventor and guitarist (b. 1932)
  - Lewis Dauber, actor (b. 1949)
  - Dana Fradon, cartoonist (b. 1922)
  - Philip Gips, designer and film poster artist (b. 1931)
  - Stephen J. Lukasik, physicist (b. 1931)
  - Philip K. Lundeberg, naval historian and World War II veteran (b. 1923)
- October 4
  - Ed Ackerson, singer-songwriter (b. 1965)
  - Peter Beckwith, Anglican prelate (b. 1939)
  - Diahann Carroll, actress (b. 1935)
  - James Schmerer, TV writer and producer (b. 1938)
  - Bob Tufts, baseball player (b. 1955)
- October 5
  - Lee Botts, environmentalist (b. 1928)
  - Andy Etchebarren, baseball player (b. 1943)
  - Blaine Lindgren, track and field athlete (b. 1939)
  - Eloy Pérez, boxer (b. 1986)
  - Philip J. Prygoski, legal scholar (b. 1947)
- October 6
  - Larry Junstrom, bass guitarist (b. 1949)
  - Karen Pendleton, child actress (b. 1946)
  - S. A. Stepanek, poet (b. 1959)
  - Stephen Swid, businessman (b. 1940)
  - Rip Taylor, comedian and actor (b. 1935)
- October 7
  - Warren William Eginton, federal judge (b. 1924)
  - Ed Kalafat, basketball player (b. 1932)
- October 8
  - Francis S. Currey, U.S. Army soldier and Medal of Honor recipient (b. 1925)
  - Chip Healy, football player (b. 1947)
  - Sammy Taylor, baseball player (b. 1933)
  - Quade Winter, composer and opera singer (b. 1951)
- October 9
  - Richard Askey, mathematician (b. 1933)
  - John W. Corso, art director (b. 1929)
  - Robert W. Estill, Episcopal prelate (b. 1927)
  - Thomas Flanagan, Irish-born Roman Catholic prelate (b. 1930)
  - Jill Freedman, photographer (b. 1939)
  - Robert Guestier Goelet, French-born businessman and philanthropist (b. 1923)
  - Samuel Hynes, author (b. 1924)
  - James O. Mason, physician (b. 1930)
  - Murray Rosenblatt, statistician and academic (b. 1926)
  - David Weisman, film producer and author (b. 1942)
- October 10
  - William J. Hamilton, politician (b. 1932)
  - Enrique Moreno, Mexican-born American lawyer (b. 1955)
  - Paul Polak, psychiatrist and entrepreneur (b. 1939)
  - Joseph E. Tregoning, politician (b. 1941)
- October 11
  - Sam Bobrick, playwright and screenwriter (b. 1932)
  - Mac Christensen, clothier (b. 1934)
  - Robert Forster, actor (b. 1941)
  - John Giorno, poet and performance artist (b. 1936)
  - James Hart Stern, civil rights activist (b. 1964)
- October 12
  - Kate Braverman, author (b. 1949)
  - E. A. Carmean, art curator and historian (b. 1945)
  - Woodie Flowers, mechanical engineer (b. 1943)
  - Bob Goin, college athletic director (b. 1938)
  - Emilio Nicolas Sr., Mexican-born American television executive (b. 1930)
  - Norman Schofield, Scottish-born political scientist (b. 1944)
- October 13
  - William T. Allen, law academic (b. 1948)
  - Scotty Bowers, male prostitute and pimp (b. 1923)
  - Bobby Del Greco, baseball player (b. 1933)
  - Jay Frank, music industry executive (b. 1971)
  - Charles Jencks, architectural historian (b. 1939)
  - Elias James Manning, American-born Brazilian Roman Catholic prelate (b. 1938)
- October 14
  - Harold Bloom, literary critic (b. 1930)
  - Steve Cash, singer-songwriter (b. 1946)
  - Emmett Chappelle, scientist (b. 1925)
  - Buckwheat Donahue, sportsman and tourism promoter (b. 1951)
  - Lou Frey, politician (b. 1934)
  - Cooper Snyder, politician (b. 1928)
  - Yvonne S. Wilson, politician (b. 1929)
- October 15
  - Mary Stuart Gile, politician (b. 1936)
  - Igo Kantor, Austrian-born film producer (b. 1930)
  - Michael D. Reynolds, astronomer and educator (b. 1954)
- October 16
  - Ed Beck, basketball player (b. 1936)
  - John Clarke, actor (b. 1931)
  - Patrick Day, boxer (b. 1992)
  - Bernard Fisher, surgeon (b. 1918)
  - Morton Mandel, billionaire businessman and philanthropist (b. 1921)
  - Harold Scheub, professor and folklorist of African cultures (b. 1931)
  - John Tate, mathematician (b. 1925)
- October 17
  - Michael F. Armstrong, lawyer (b. 1932)
  - Hildegard Bachert, German-born art dealer (b. 1921)
  - Zev Braun, film and television producer (b. 1928)
  - Elijah Cummings, politician (b. 1951)
  - Alan Diamonstein, politician (b. 1931)
  - Bob Kingsley, radio personality (b. 1939)
  - Bill Macy, actor (b. 1922)
  - Victor Mohica, actor (b. 1933)
  - Ray Santos, saxophonist (b. 1928)
- October 18
  - Edward Clark, abstract painter (b. 1926)
  - Michael Flaksman, cellist (b. 1946)
  - Mark Hurd, business executive (b. 1957)
  - Ahad Israfil, gunshot survivor (b. 1972)
  - William Milliken, politician (b. 1922)
  - Lou Palmer, sportscaster (b. 1935)
  - Mike Reilly, football player (b. 1942)
- October 19
  - E. Bruce Heilman, university president (b. 1926)
  - Joseph Lombardo, mobster (b. 1929)
- October 20
  - Eric Cooper, baseball umpire (b. 1966)
  - Thomas D'Alesandro III, politician (b. 1929)
  - Rufus E. Jones, politician (b. 1940)
  - Robert I. Price, Coast Guard admiral (b. 1921)
  - Nick Tosches, journalist and biographer (b. 1949)
  - Dottie Wham, politician (b. 1925)
- October 21
  - Willie Brown, football player (b. 1940)
  - John M. Downs, courtroom sketch artist (b. 1937)
  - Josip Elic, actor (b. 1921)
  - Jerry Fogel, actor (b. 1936)
  - Mike Hebert, volleyball coach (b. 1944)
  - Reginald Tate, politician (b. 1954)
- October 22
  - George Brancato, football player and coach (b. 1931)
  - Ed Cherney, recording engineer (b. 1950)
  - Vicki Funk, botanist (b. 1947)
  - Jo Ann Zimmerman, politician (b. 1936)
- October 23
  - J. Rogers Hollingsworth, historian and sociologist (b. 1932)
  - James W. Montgomery, Episcopalian prelate (b. 1921)
  - Bernie Parrish, football player (b. 1936)
  - Francis A. Sullivan, theologian (b. 1922)
  - Tom Stevens, politician (b. 1956)
- October 24
  - Michael Blumlein, writer and physician (b. 1948))
  - Leroy Johnson, politician (b. 1928)
- October 25
  - Chou Wen-chung, Chinese-born composer (b. 1923)
  - Peter H. Hassrick, artist and author (b. 1941)
  - Joe Sun, country singer-songwriter (b. 1943)
  - Don Valentine, venture capitalist (b. 1932)
- October 26
  - Paul André Albert, metallurgist (b. 1926)
  - Paul Barrere, singer-songwriter and guitarist (b. 1948)
  - Daniel W. Dobberpuhl, electrical engineer (b. 1945)
  - Robert Evans, film producer and convicted drug trafficker (b. 1930)
  - Chuck Meriwether, baseball umpire (b. 1956)
  - Gregory E. Pyle, Choctaw Nation politician (b. 1949)
  - Thaddeus Seymour, academic (b. 1928)
  - John Stauffer, politician (b. 1925)
- October 27
  - Tim Chambers, baseball coach (b. 1965)
  - Stephen P. Cohen, political scientist (b. 1936)
  - John Conyers, politician (b. 1929)
  - Kelly C. Crabb, sports and entertainment lawyer (b. 1946)
  - Johanna Lindsey, romance novelist (b. 1952)
- October 28
  - Al Bianchi, basketball player, coach, and executive (b. 1932)
  - Ron Dunlap, basketball player and educator (b. 1946)
  - Kay Hagan, politician (b. 1953)
  - John Walker, politician (b. 1937)
- October 29
  - Gerald Baliles, politician (b. 1940)
  - Richard Lennon, Roman Catholic prelate (b. 1947)
  - Charlie Taaffe, football coach (b. 1950)
  - John Witherspoon, actor and comedian (b. 1942)
- October 30
  - Paul Crosby, basketball player (b. 1989)
  - Ron Fairly, baseball player (b. 1938)
  - William J. Hughes, politician and diplomat (b. 1932)
  - Sam Jankovich, football coach and athletic director (b. 1934)
  - J. Bob Traxler, politician (b. 1931)
- October 31
  - Ann Crumb, actress and singer (b. 1950)
  - Roger Morin, Roman Catholic prelate (b. 1941)
  - Hunter Pitts O'Dell, civil rights activist (b. 1923)

== November ==
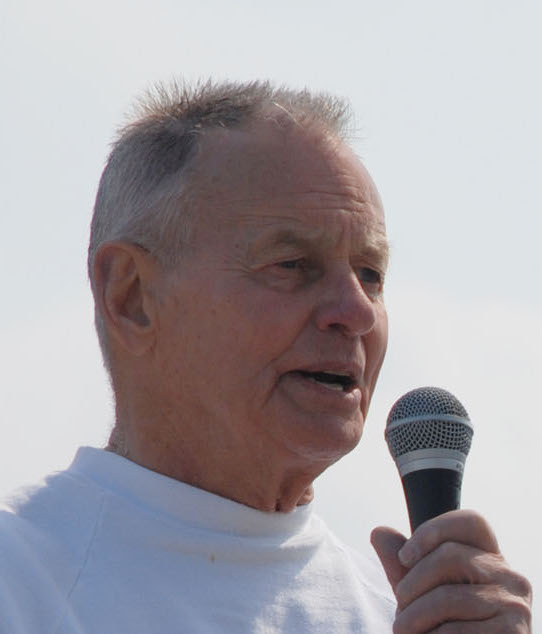
Rudy Boesch

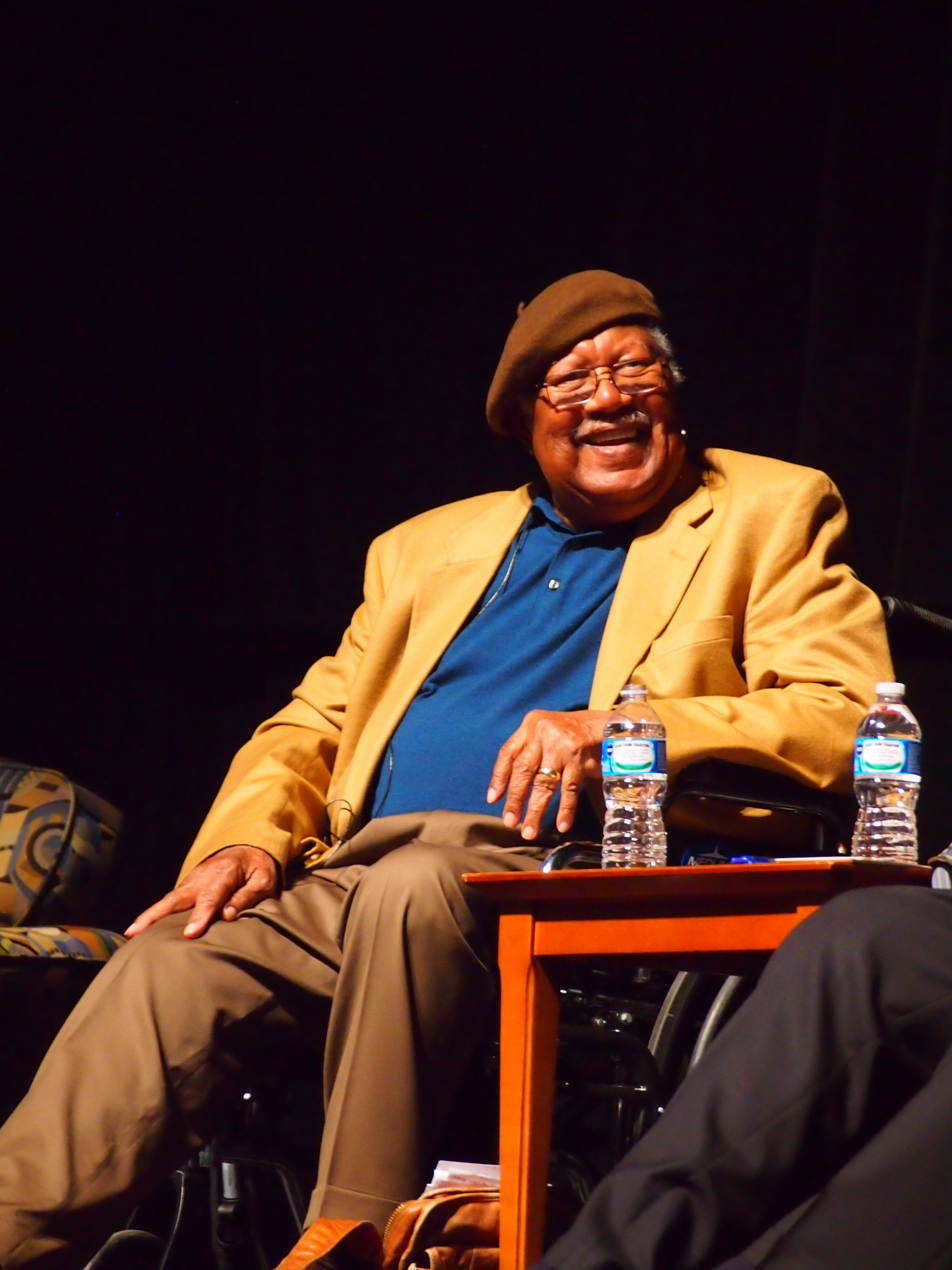
Ernest J. Gaines

Stephen Dixon

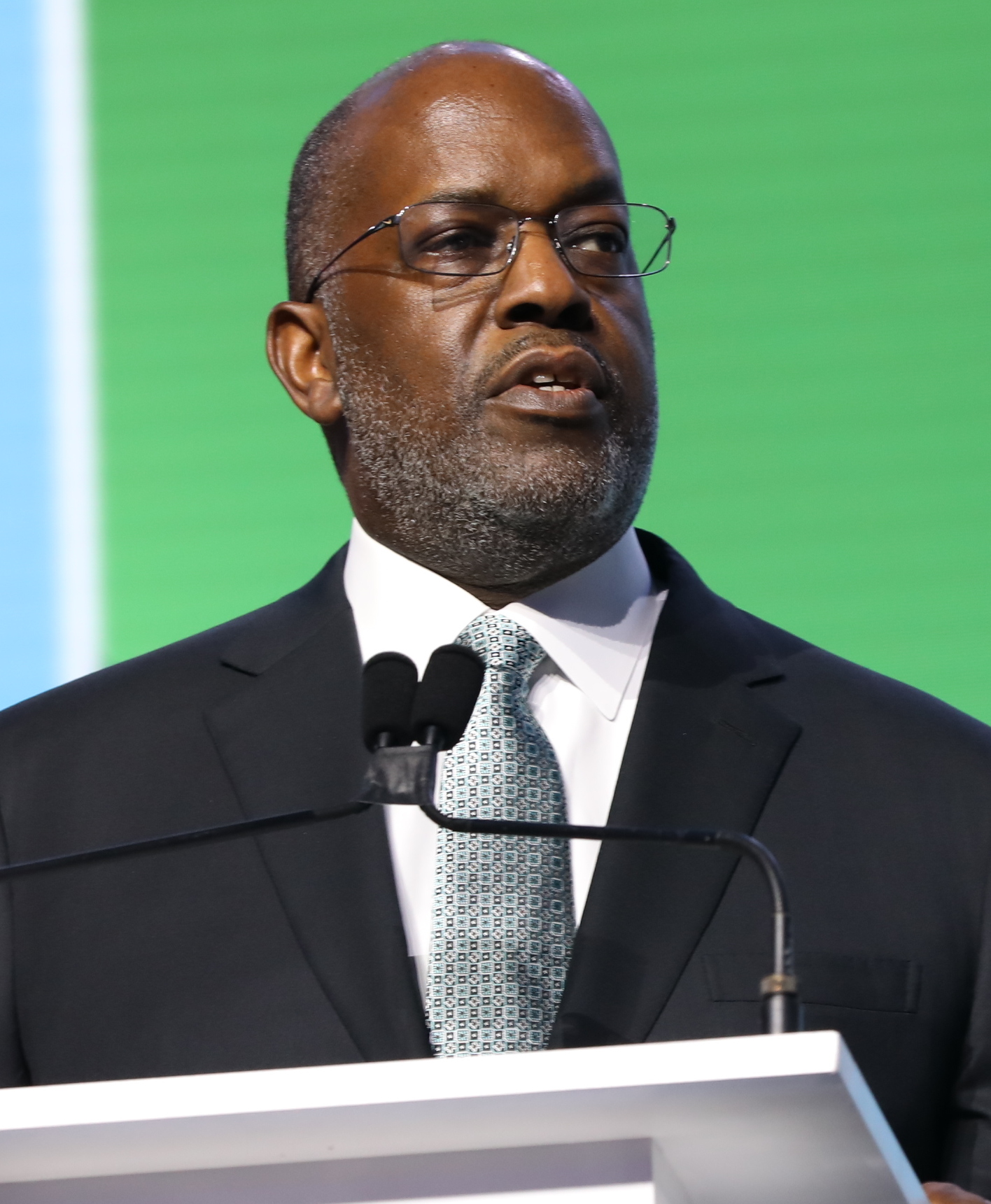
Bernard Tyson

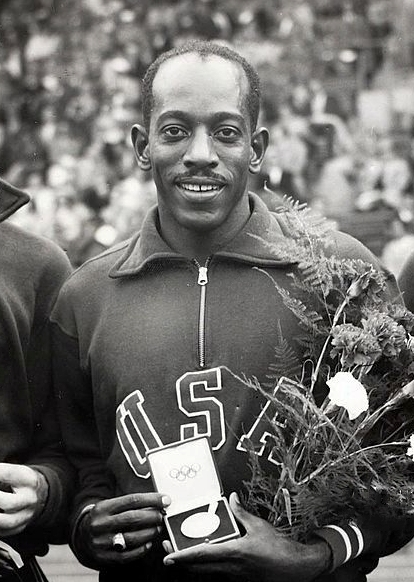
Harrison Dillard

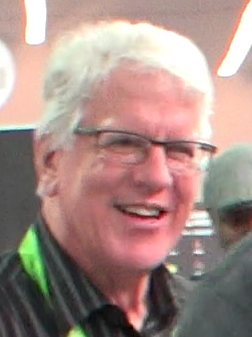
Tom Lyle

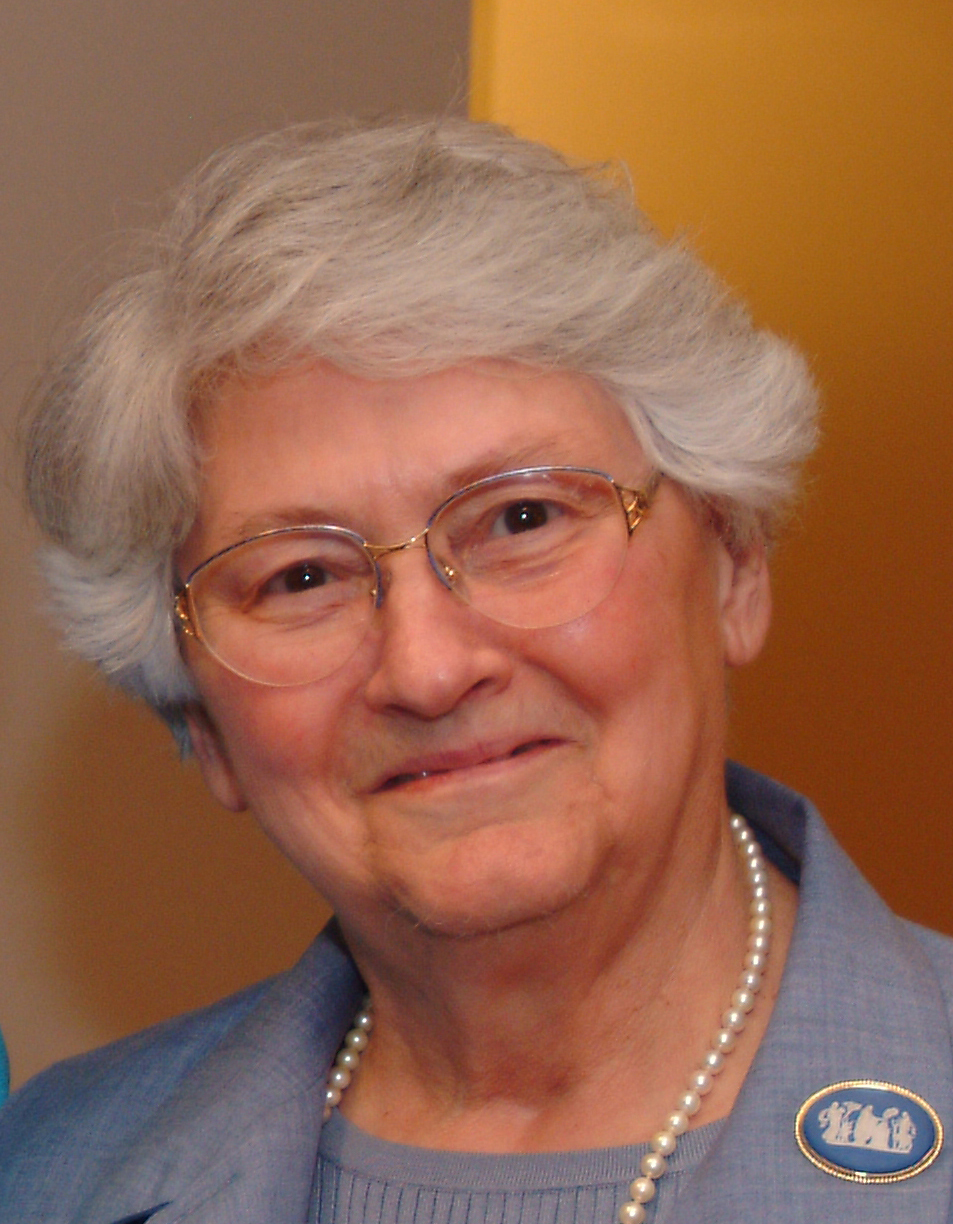
Mary L. Good

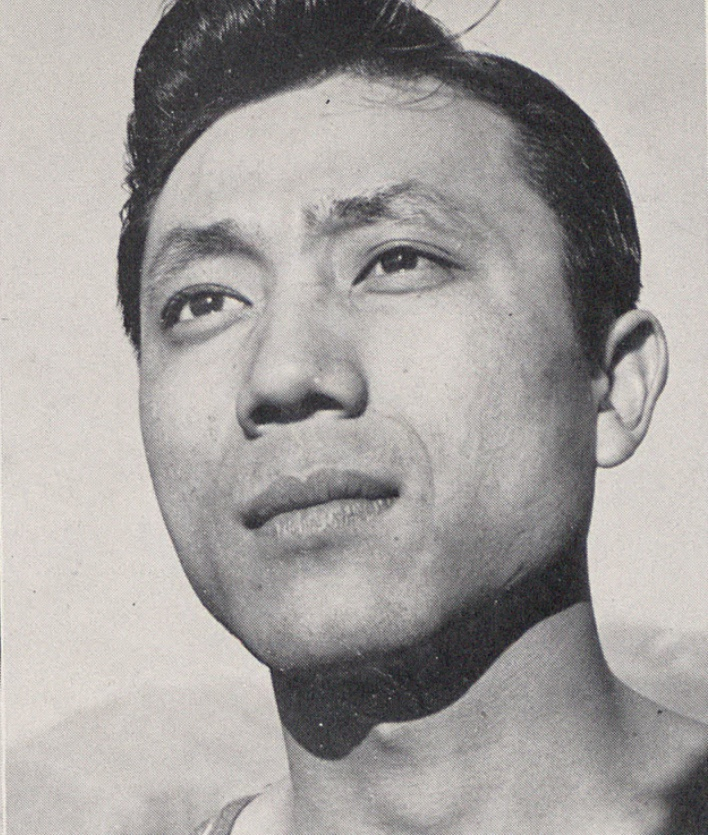
Wataru Misaka

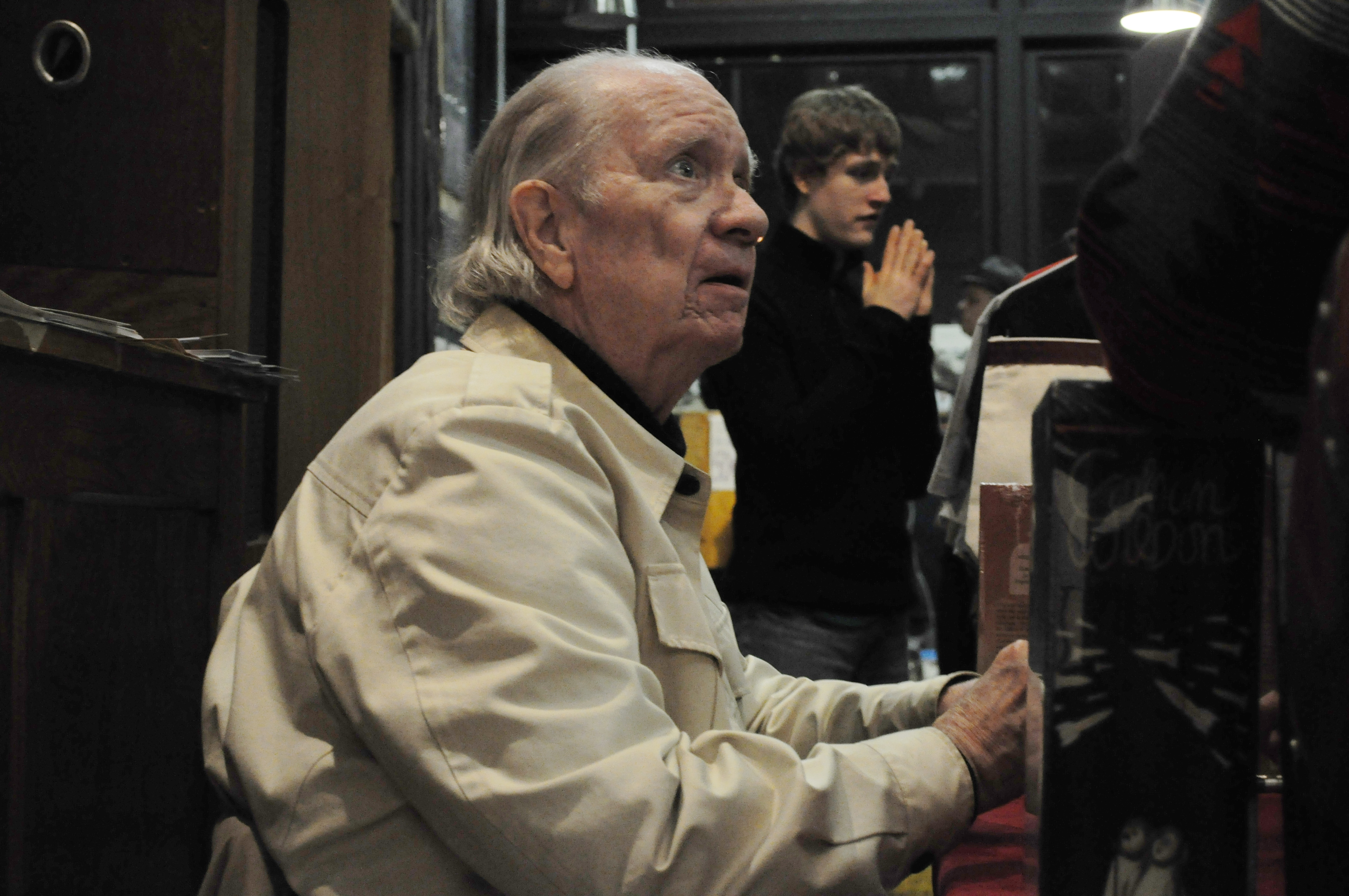
Gahan Wilson

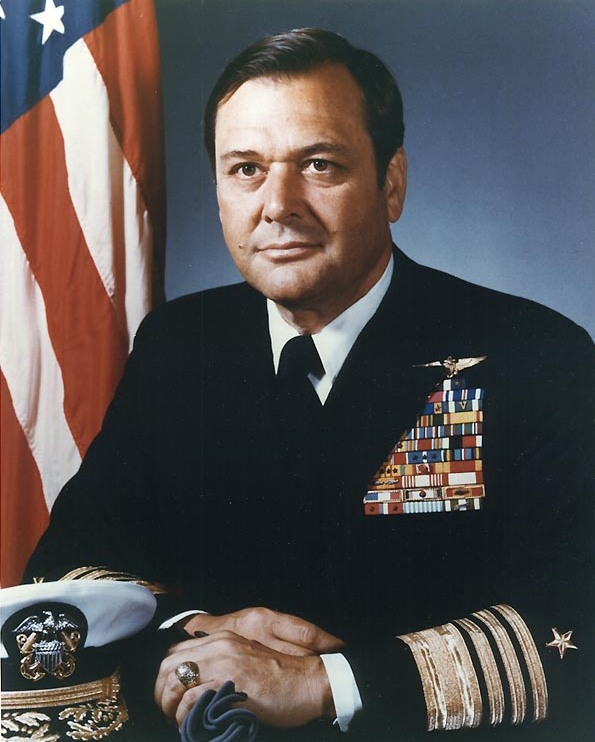
James L. Holloway III

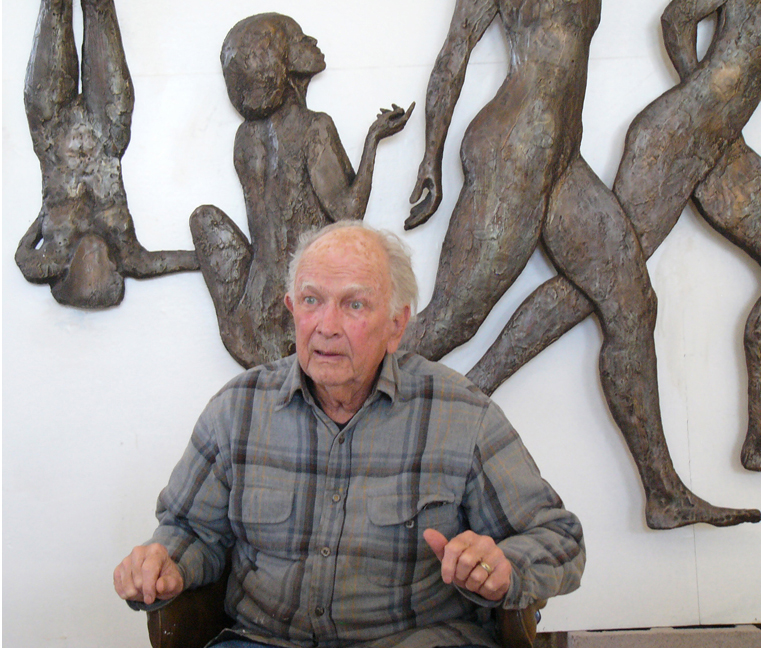
John Henry Waddell

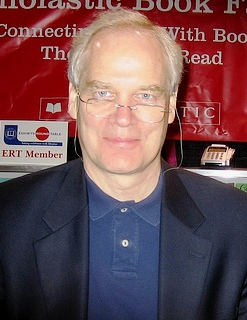
Andrew Clements

- November 1
  - Rudy Boesch, U.S. Navy SEAL and realty show contestant (b. 1928)
  - Peter Collier, writer and publisher (b. 1939)
  - Marc LeBlanc, sailor (b. 1950)
- November 2
  - Gene G. Abdallah, U.S. Marshal and politician (b. 1936)
  - Irwin Fridovich, biochemist (b. 1929)
  - James I. Robertson Jr., historian (b. 1930)
  - Brian Tarantina, actor (b. 1959)
- November 3
  - Gert Boyle, German-born American businesswoman (b. 1924)
  - William B. Branch, dramatist (b. 1927)
  - Louis Eppolito, police detective and mobster (b. 1948)
- November 4
  - Jim LeClair, football player (b. 1950)
  - Virginia Leith, actress (b. 1925)
- November 5
  - Sally Dixon, film curator (b. 1932)
  - Ernest J. Gaines, author (b. 1933)
  - Michael Sherwood, keyboardist and singer (b. 1959)
  - William Wintersole, actor (b. 1931)
- November 6
  - Nikki Araguz, same-sex marriage activist (b. 1975)
  - Stephen Dixon, author (b. 1936)
  - Mike Streicher, racing driver (b. 1957)
- November 7
  - Dan McGrew, football player (b. 1937)
  - Frank Saul, basketball player (b. 1924)
  - Janette Sherman, toxicologist and activist (b. 1930)
- November 9
  - Ross Bell, entomologist (b. 1929)
  - Noel Ignatiev, Marxist historian and activist (b. 1940)
  - Yusuf Scott, football player (b. 1976)
- November 10
  - Jim Adams, lacrosse coach (b. 1928)
  - Russell Chatham, painter (b. 1939)
  - Rick Ludwin, television executive (b. 1948)
  - Lawrence G. Paull, production designer and art director (b. 1938)
  - Bernard Tyson, health executive (b. 1959)
- November 11
  - Tauba Biterman, Polish-American centenarian and Holocaust survivor (b. 1917)
  - Zeke Bratkowski, football player (b. 1931)
  - Mary Christian, educator and politician (b. 1924)
  - Alan Hagman, photojournalist (b. 1964)
  - Priscilla Lockwood, politician (b. 1936)
  - Charles Rogers, football player (b. 1981)
- November 12
  - Bob Johnson, baseball player (b. 1936)
  - William J. McCoy, politician (b. 1942)
  - Ann Peoples, politician (b. 1947)
  - Dois I. Rosser Jr., businessman and missionary (b. 1921)
  - Machelle Hackney Hobson, former YouTube personality (b. 1971)
- November 13 – Tom Spurgeon, comics journalist (b. 1968)
- November 14
  - Anthony Grundy, basketball player (b. 1979)
  - Charles Moir, basketball coach (b. 1930)
  - Orville Rogers, masters runner and centenarian (b. 1917)
- November 15
  - Mark Cady, judge (b. 1953)
  - Jim Coates, baseball pitcher (b. 1932)
  - Harrison Dillard, track and field athlete (b. 1923)
  - Irv Noren, baseball player (b. 1924)
  - Papa Don Schroeder, record producer and music executive (b. 1940)
- November 16
  - Diane Loeffler, politician (b. 1953)
  - Joel Skornicka, politician (b. 1937)
- November 18 – Brad McQuaid, video game designer (b. 1968)
- November 19
  - Bob Hallberg, basketball coach (b. 1944)
  - Tom Lyle, comics artist (b. 1953)
  - Manoucher Yektai, Iranian-American artist (b. 1921)
- November 20
  - Jake Burton Carpenter, snowboarder (b. 1954)
  - Fred Cox, football player (b. 1938)
  - Mary L. Good, inorganic chemist (b. 1931)
  - John Martin, racing driver (b. 1939)
  - Wataru Misaka, basketball player (b. 1923)
  - Linda Orange, politician (b. 1950)
  - Michael J. Pollard, actor (b. 1939)
- November 21
  - Val Heim, baseball player (b. 1920)
  - Barbara Mandel, community activist and philanthropist (b. 1925)
  - Gahan Wilson, cartoonist (b. 1930)
- November 22
  - Alfred E. Smith IV, stockbroker and philanthropist (b. 1951)
  - Bowen Stassforth, swimmer (b. 1926)
  - Warren Wolf, football coach and politician (b. 1927)
- November 23
  - Will Brunson, baseball pitcher (b. 1970)
  - Barbara Hillary, polar explorer (b. 1931)
  - Catherine Small Long, politician (b. 1924)
  - Harry Morton, restaurateur (b. 1981)
- November 24
  - Hank Bullough, football player and coach (b. 1934)
  - Robert Godshall, politician (b. 1933)
  - Dion Neutra, architect (b. 1926)
  - Robert F. X. Sillerman, billionaire entertainment executive (b. 1948)
  - John Simon, writer and critic (b. 1925)
- November 25
  - Frank Biondi, entertainment executive (b. 1945)
  - George Clements, Roman Catholic priest and civil rights activist (b. 1932)
  - Pete Musser, business executive and philanthropist (b. 1926)
  - Jay Powell, politician (b. 1952)
- November 26
  - Howard Cruse, comics artist (b. 1944)
  - James L. Holloway III, U.S. Navy admiral (b. 1922)
- November 27
  - Clay Evans, Baptist pastor, gospel singer, and civil rights activist (b. 1925)
  - Jaegwon Kim, Korean-American philosopher (b. 1934)
  - Agnes Baker Pilgrim, Takelma elder and activist (b. 1924)
  - John B. Robbins, medical researcher (b. 1932)
  - William Ruckelshaus, lawyer and politician (b. 1932)
  - John Henry Waddell, sculptor, painter, and art educator (b. 1921)
- November 28
  - Marion McClinton, theatre director, playwright, and actor (b. 1954)
  - John McKissick, football coach (b. 1926)
  - Kermit Staggers, politician (b. 1947)
  - John Strohmayer, baseball pitcher (b. 1946)
- November 29
  - Ruth Anderson, composer (b. 1928)
  - Irving Burgie, songwriter (b. 1924)
  - Andrew Clements, children's author (b. 1949)
  - William E. Macaulay, billionaire business executive and philanthropist (b. 1945)
  - Fitzhugh Mullan, physician, educator, and activist (b. 1942)
  - Seymour Siwoff, sports statistician and businessman (b. 1920)
  - R-Kal Truluck, football player (b. 1974)
  - Phil Wyman, politician (b. 1945)
- November 30 – Ralph Anderson, politician (b. 1927)

== December ==
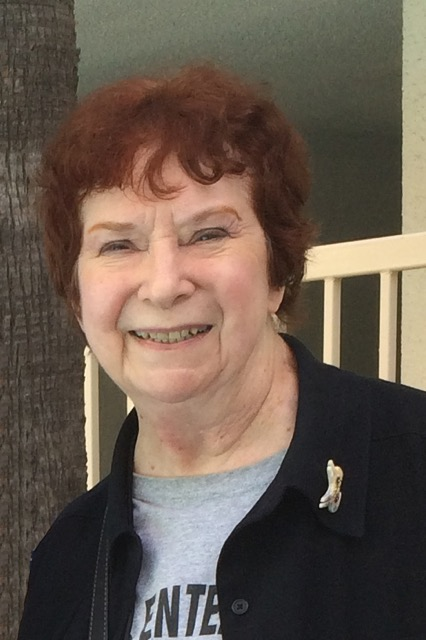
D. C. Fontana

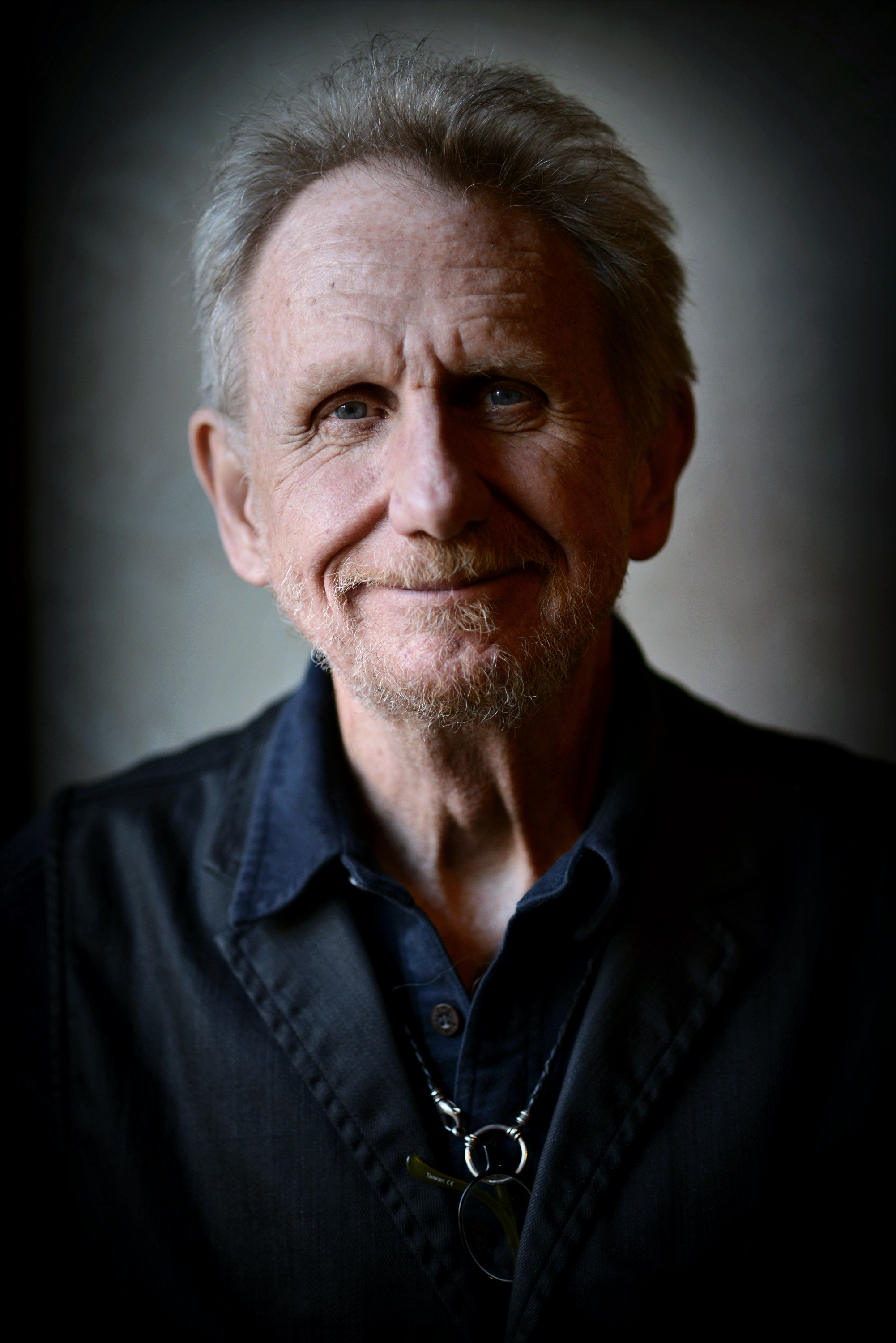
René Auberjonois

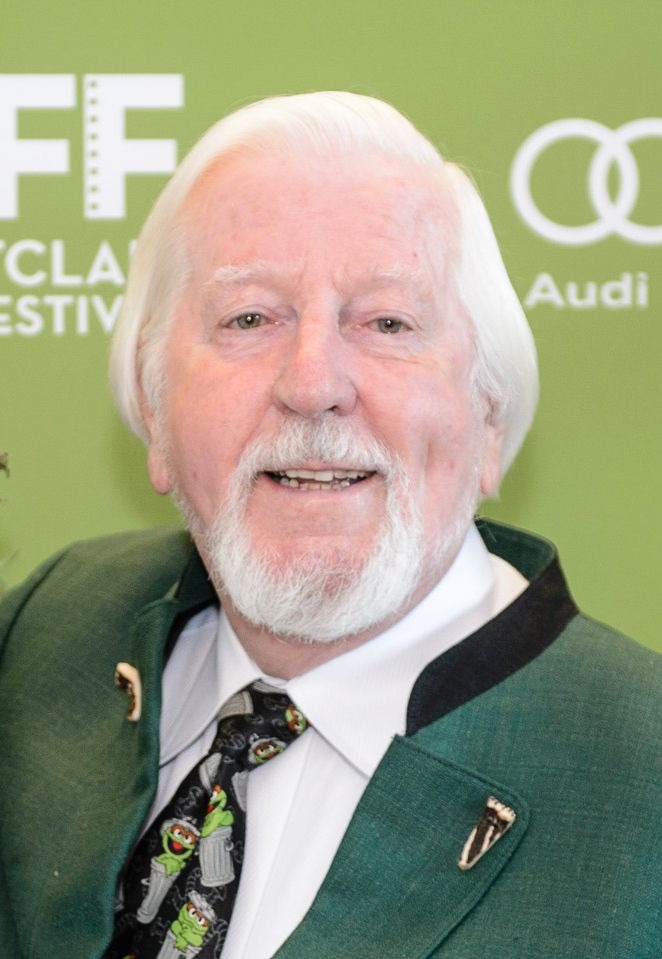
Caroll Spinney

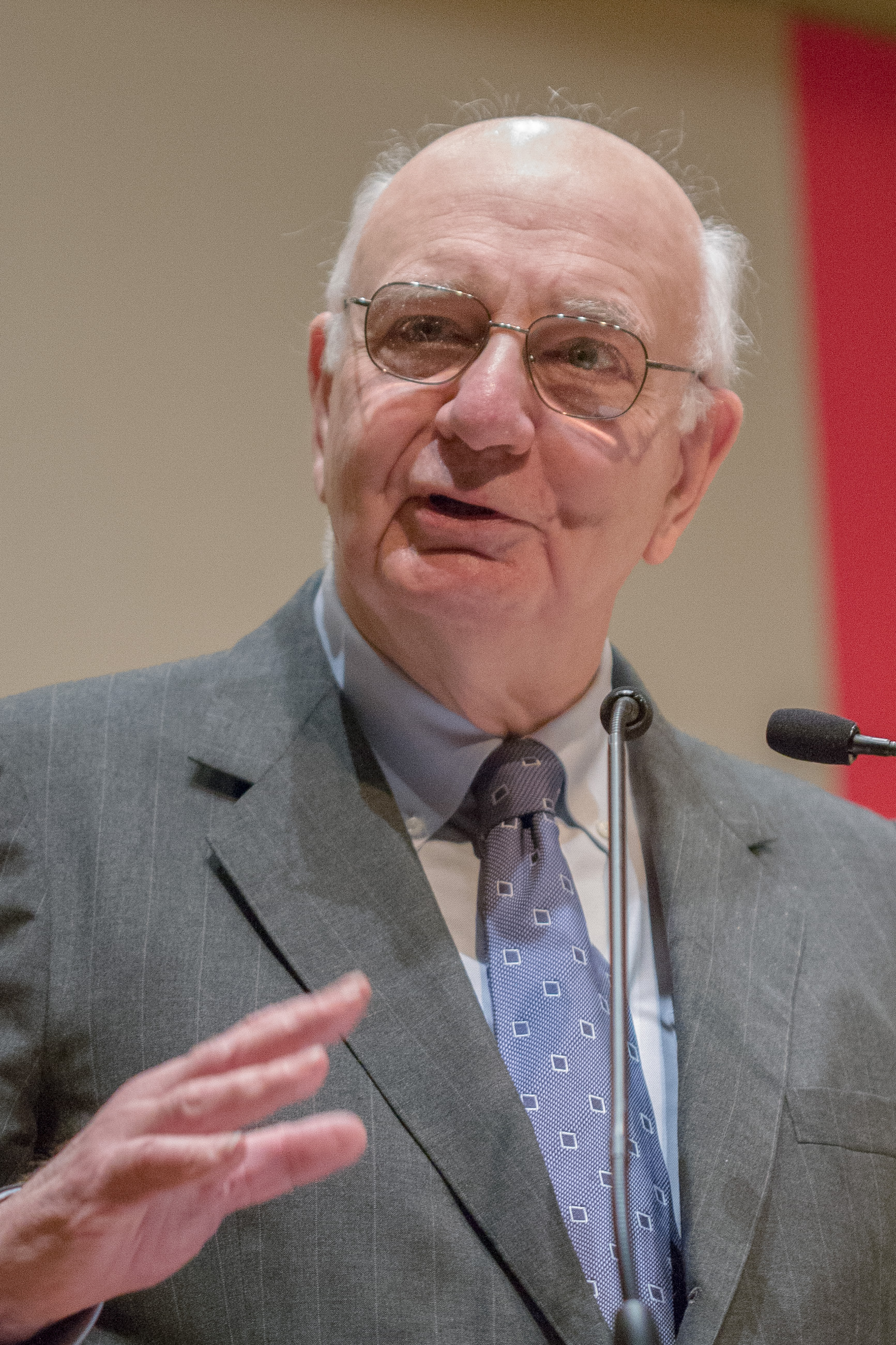
Paul Volcker

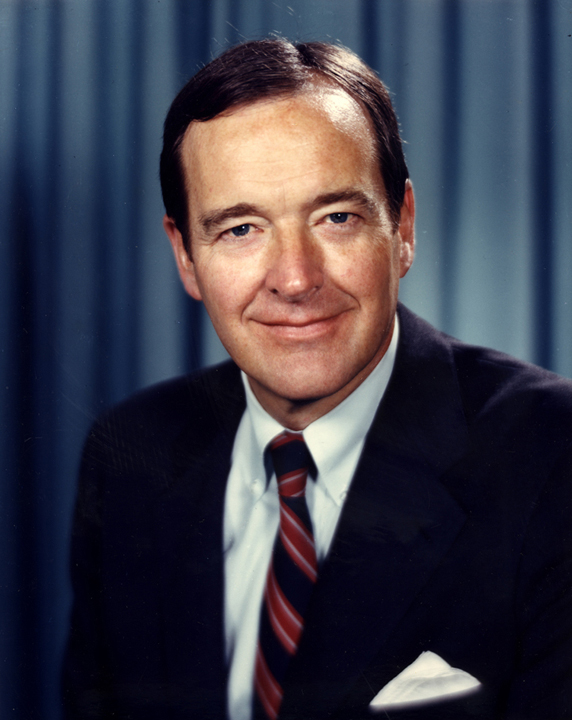
Frederick B. Dent

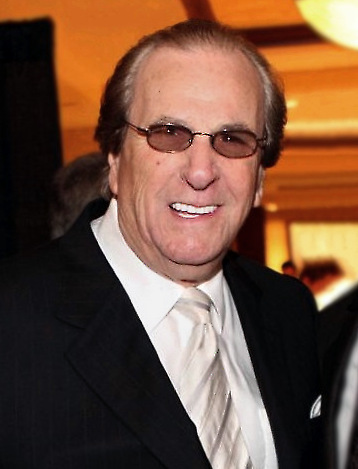
Danny Aiello

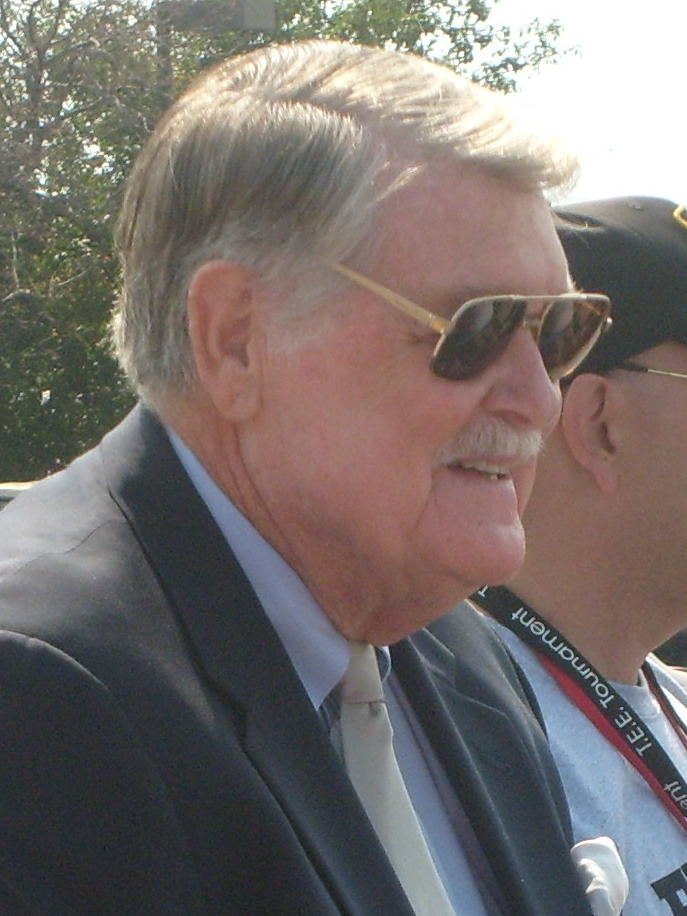
Hayden Fry

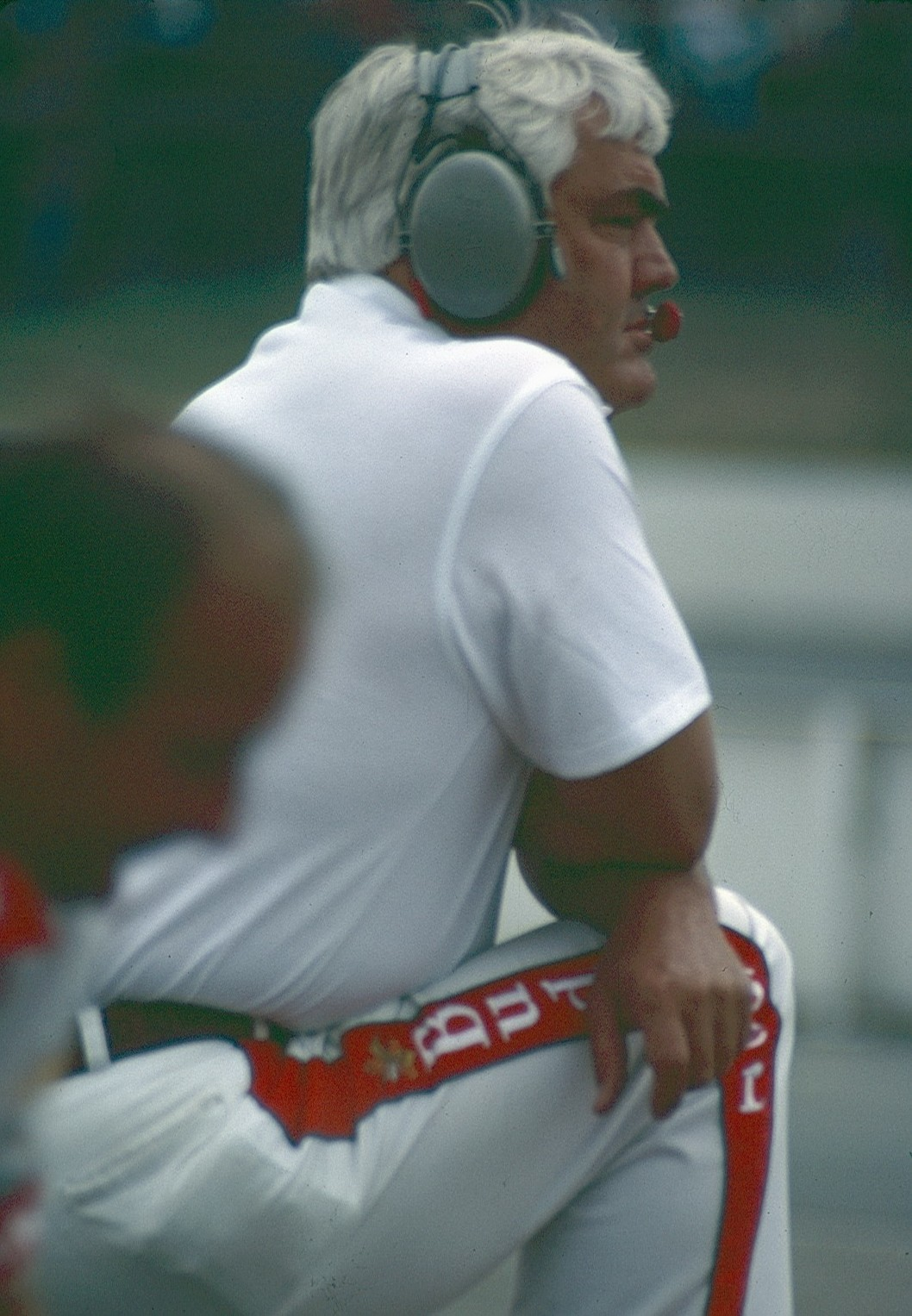
Junior Johnson

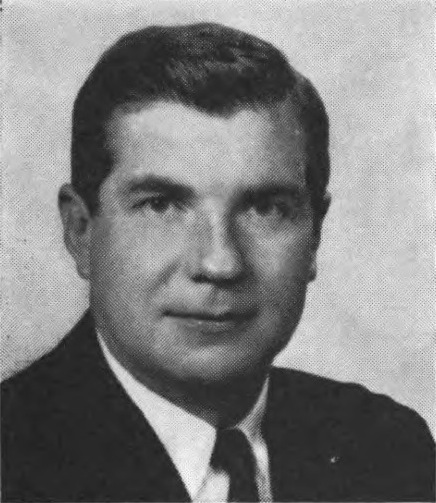
Fred B. Rooney

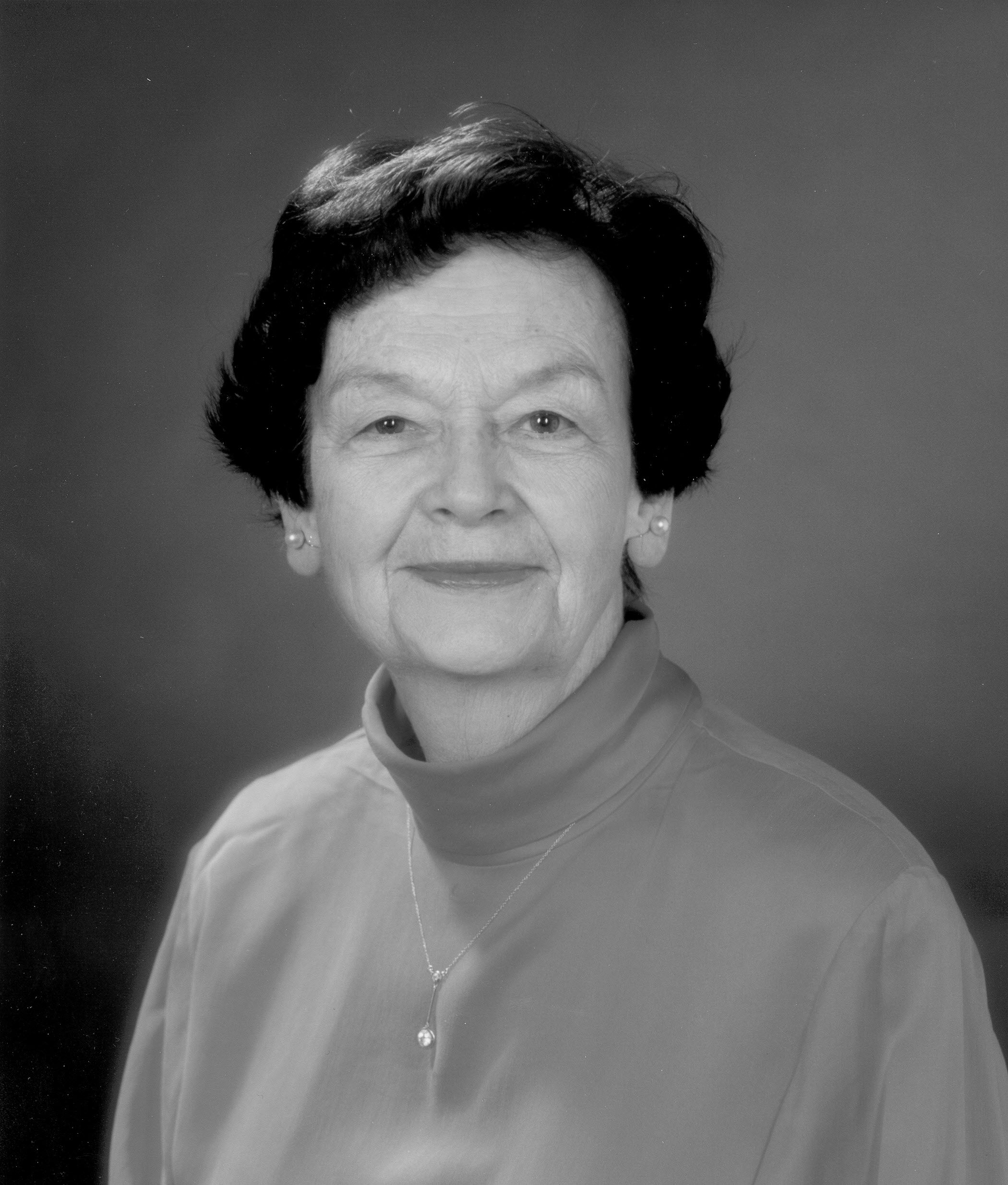
Jocelyn Burdick

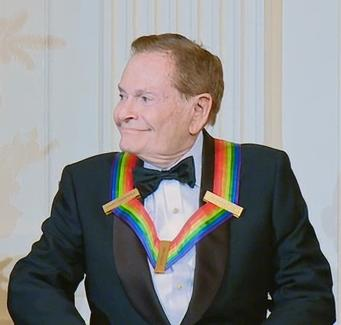
Jerry Herman

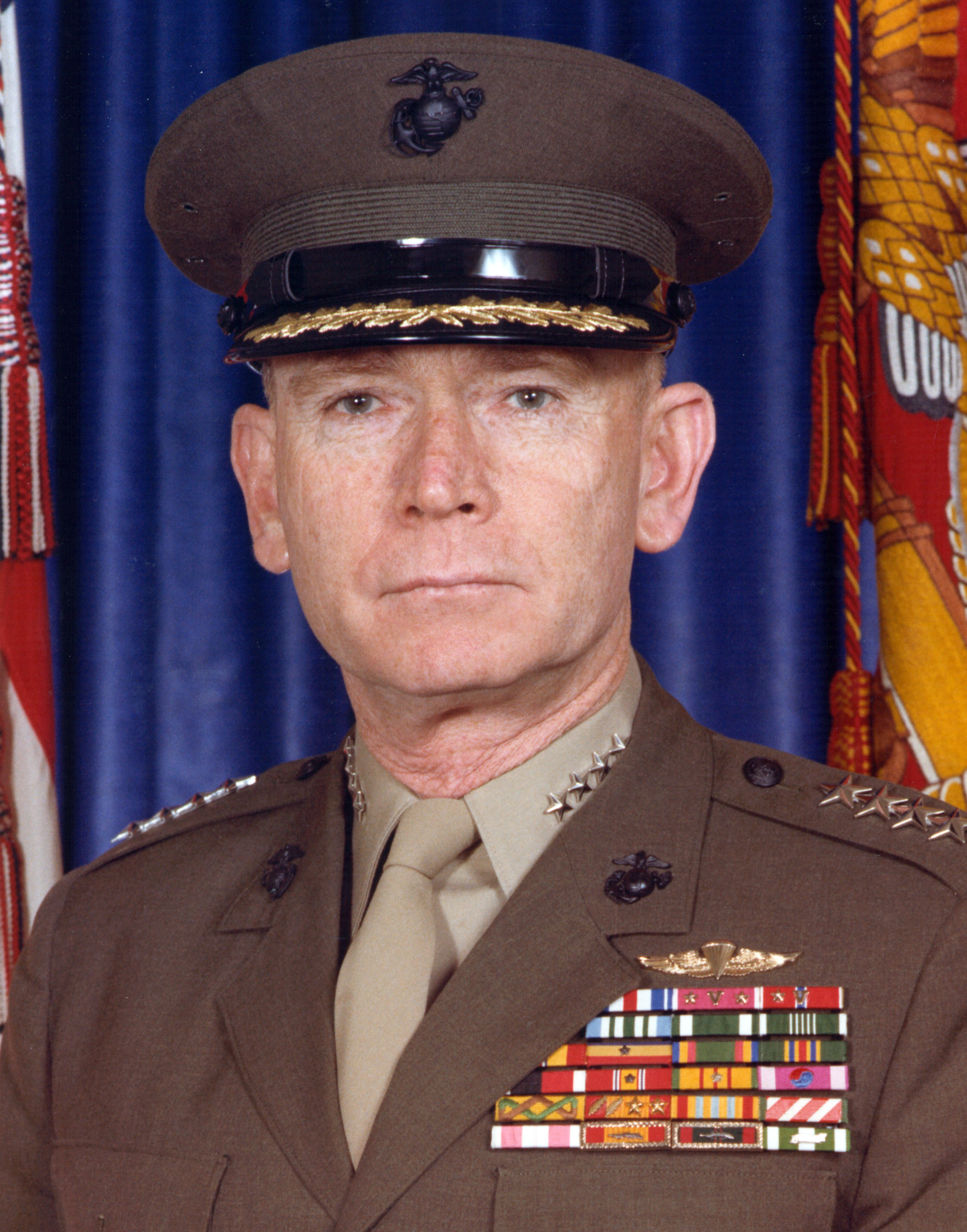
Paul X. Kelley

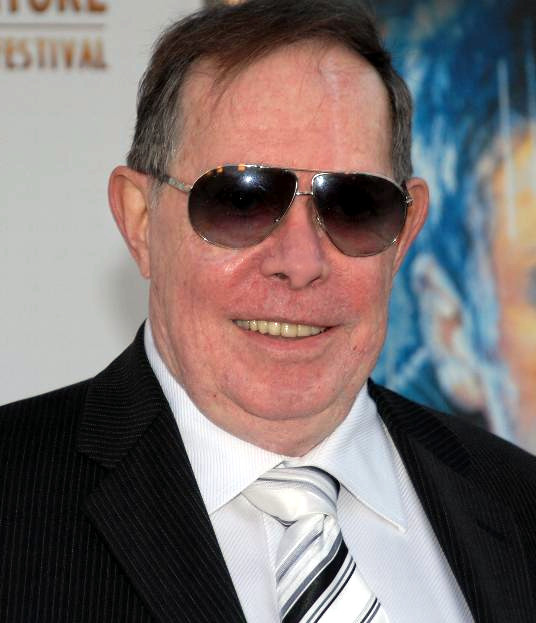
Syd Mead

- December 1
  - Robert M. Koerner, engineer (b. 1933)
  - Lil Bub, celebrity cat (b. 2011)
  - Shelley Morrison, actress (b. 1936)
  - Paul Sirba, Roman Catholic prelate (b. 1960)
  - Paul Sullivan, football player and coach (b. 1950)
- December 2
  - George Atkinson III, football player (b. 1992)
  - Michael Brewster, politician (b. 1954)
  - Jimmy Cavallo, saxophonist (b. 1927)
  - D. C. Fontana, television writer (b. 1939)
  - Robert K. Massie, historian (b. 1929)
  - Joe Smith, music executive (b. 1928)
  - Kenneth Allen Taylor, philosopher (b. 1954)
- December 4
  - Cas Banaszek, football player (b. 1945)
  - Leonard Goldberg, film and television producer (b. 1934)
  - Margaret Morgan Lawrence, psychiatrist and centenarian (b. 1914)
  - C. O. Simpkins Sr., dentist, politician, and civil rights activist (b. 1925)
- December 5
  - Jon Comer, skateboarder (b. 1976)
  - Marvin Goodfriend, economist (b. 1950)
  - Sherman Howard, football player (b. 1924)
  - George Laurer, electrical engineer (b. 1925)
  - Robert Walker, actor (b. 1940)
- December 6
  - Ron Leibman, actor (b. 1937)
  - Kimmi Lewis, politician (b. 1957)
  - Donald B. Marron, billionaire financier, art collector, and philanthropist (b. 1934)
  - Jo Ann Washam, golfer (b. 1950)
- December 7
  - Gerald Barrax, poet and educator (b. 1933)
  - Berkley Bedell, politician and businessman (b. 1921)
  - Lisa de Cazotte, soap opera producer (b. 1961)
  - Denise D'Ascenzo, television news anchor (b. 1958)
  - Bump Elliott, football player, coach, and athletic director (b. 1925)
  - Joe McQueen, jazz saxophonist (b. 1919)
- December 8
  - René Auberjonois, actor and singer (b. 1940)
  - Doyle Corman, politician (b. 1932)
  - Jerry Karr, politician (b. 1936)
  - Caroll Spinney, puppeteer (b. 1933)
  - Paul Volcker, economist and Federal Reserve chairman (b. 1927)
  - Juice WRLD, rapper (b. 1998)
- December 9
  - John Broxson, politician (b. 1932)
  - Leon Hardeman, football player (b. 1932)
  - Chuck Heberling, sports administrator and referee (b. 1925)
  - William Luce, playwright (b. 1931)
  - May Stevens, feminist artist (b. 1924)
- December 10
  - Frederick B. Dent, businessman and politician (b. 1922)
  - Gershon Kingsley, electronic musician and composer (b. 1922)
  - Emily Mason, painter (b. 1932)
  - Philip McKeon, actor (b. 1964)
  - Randy Suess, computer programmer (b. 1945)
  - Scott Timberg, journalist and author (b. 1969)
- December 11
  - Larry Heinemann, novelist (b. 1944)
  - James McCarthy, oceanographer (b. 1944)
  - William S. McFeely, historian (b. 1930)
- December 12
  - Danny Aiello, actor (b. 1933)
  - Vaughan Johnson, football player (b. 1962)
  - David H. Locke, politician (b. 1927)
  - Jack Scott, Canadian-American singer-songwriter (b. 1936)
- December 13
  - Lawrence Bittaker, serial killer (b. 1940)
  - Richard G. Hatcher, politician (b. 1933)
  - PHASE 2, graffiti artist (b. 1955)
  - Emil Richards, jazz percussionist (b. 1932)
  - Carl Scheer, basketball executive (b. 1936)
- December 14
  - Moondog Rex, professional wrestler (b. 1950)
  - Felix Rohatyn, banker and diplomat (b. 1928)
  - Irv Williams, jazz saxophonist (b. 1919)
  - Doug Woog, ice hockey coach (b. 1944)
- December 15
  - Wense Grabarek, politician (b. 1919)
  - Robert Kinkead, chef and restaurateur (b. 1952)
  - Morgan Porteus, Episcopal bishop (b. 1917)
- December 16
  - Rich Rundles, baseball pitcher (b. 1981)
  - Bill Simpson, racing driver and entrepreneur (b. 1940)
- December 17
  - Hayden Fry, football player and coach (b. 1929)
  - Scot Kleinendorst, ice hockey player (b. 1960)
- December 18
  - Al Adinolfi, politician (b. 1934)
  - Herman Boone, football coach (b. 1935)
  - Ellen Shub, photojournalist (b. 1946)
- December 19
  - Ward Just, journalist and author (b. 1935)
  - Saoul Mamby, boxer (b. 1947)
  - Arthur Verow, politician (b. 1942)
- December 20
  - Junior Johnson, NASCAR driver and team owner (b. 1931)
  - Stanley J. Stein, historian of Latin America (b. 1920)
  - Woody Vasulka, video artist (b. 1937)
- December 21
  - Louis Jenkins, poet (b. 1942)
  - Isaac Kramnick, historian (b. 1938)
  - Joseph Segel, entrepreneur (b. 1931)
- December 22
  - Greg Kirk, politician (b. 1963)
  - Ram Dass, spiritual teacher and psychologist (b. 1931)
  - Elizabeth Spencer, writer (b. 1921)
- December 23
  - Elmer Beseler Harris, political strategist (b. 1939)
  - Fred B. Rooney, politician (b. 1925)
- December 24
  - Rusty Hilger, football player (b. 1962)
  - Dave Riley, bass guitarist (b. 1960)
  - Allee Willis, songwriter (b. 1947)
- December 25
  - Eliot Glassheim, politician (b. 1938)
  - William Greider, journalist and economics writer (b. 1936)
  - Lee Mendelson, television producer (b. 1933)
  - Chuck Turner, politician (b. 1941)
- December 26
  - Jocelyn Burdick, U.S. Senator (b. 1922)
  - Elbert Dubenion, football player (b. 1933)
  - Jerry Herman, composer and lyricist (b. 1931)
  - Sleepy LaBeef, rockabilly singer and musician (b. 1935)
  - Sue Lyon, actress (b. 1946)
- December 27
  - Ulysses Currie, politician (b. 1937)
  - Don Imus, radio personality (b. 1940)
  - J. Charles Jones, civil rights activist (b. 1937)
  - Neal Peirce, columnist and author (b. 1932)
  - Remilia, esports player (b. 1995)
  - John Rothchild, financial writer (b. 1945)
- December 28
  - Carley Ann McCord, sports journalist (b. 1989)
  - Fred Graham, journalist and television anchor (b. 1931)
  - Izzy Slapawitz, professional wrestler (b. 1948)
- December 29
  - LaDell Andersen, basketball coach (b. 1929)
  - Paul X. Kelley, U.S. Marine Corps commandant (b. 1928)
  - Norma Tanega, singer-songwriter (b. 1939)
- December 30
  - Jack Garfein, stage and film director and acting teacher (b. 1930)
  - Gertrude Himmelfarb, historian (b. 1922)
  - Syd Mead, industrial designer and concept artist (b. 1933)
- December 31
  - Vic Juris, jazz guitarist (b. 1953)
  - J. L. Lewis, golfer (b. 1960)
  - Martin West, actor (b. 1937)
