= Deaths in October 2019 =

The following is a list of notable deaths in October 2019.

Entries for each day are listed alphabetically by surname. A typical entry lists information in the following sequence:

- Name, age, country of citizenship at birth, subsequent country of citizenship (if applicable), reason for notability, cause of death (if known), and reference.

== October 2019 ==
=== 1 ===
- Gilbert Albert, 89, Swiss jeweller.
- Joseph Bismuth, 92, Tunisian politician, senator (2005–2011).
- Ed Chalpin, 84, American record executive and producer.
- Cain Hope Felder, 76, American theologian and author.
- Anders Ferm, 81, Swedish diplomat, Ambassador to the United Nations (1982–1988).
- Karel Gott, 80, Czech singer, acute myeloid leukemia.
- Han Qiwei, 85, Chinese hydraulic engineer, member of the Chinese Academy of Engineering.
- Jouko Innanen, 66, Finnish cartoonist.
- Gertrude Newsome Jackson, 95, American community activist.
- Miguel León-Portilla, 93, Mexican anthropologist and historian.
- Michel Létourneau, 69, Canadian politician, MNA (1994–2007).
- Mikayla Martin, 22, Canadian athlete, injuries sustained in biking accident.
- C. K. Menon, 70, Indian transportation executive and philanthropist, complications from pneumonia.
- Fred Molyneux, 75, English footballer (Southport, Plymouth Argyle, Tranmere Rovers).
- Esther Takei Nishio, 94, American internee (Granada War Relocation Center).
- Wolfgang Perner, 52, Austrian biathlete, Olympic bronze medalist (2002).
- Walter C. Pitman III, 87, American geophysicist.
- Eric Pleskow, 95, Austrian-born American film producer, President of United Artists (1973–1978) and Orion Pictures (1978–1991).
- Richard Scotton, 88, Australian health economist.
- Peter Sissons, 77, British journalist and broadcaster (BBC News, ITN, Question Time).
- Dick Soash, 78, American politician, member of the Colorado Senate (1976–1984).
- Arto Tchakmaktchian, 86, Egyptian-born Armenian-Canadian sculptor and painter.
- Gérald Tougas, 86, Canadian writer.
- Ruben A. Valdez, 82, American politician, member (1970–1978) and Speaker (1975–1976) of the Colorado House of Representatives.
- Beverly Watkins, 80, American blues guitarist.
- Wen Chuanyuan, 101, Chinese aeronautical engineer, designed China's first UAV and first flight simulator.

=== 2 ===
- Dale Anderson, 66, Canadian Olympic boxer.
- Grazia Barcellona, 90, Italian Olympic skater (1948).
- Michael Bauman, 69, American theologian.
- Bill Bidwill, 88, American football team owner (Arizona Cardinals).
- Cecil Butler, 82, American baseball player (Milwaukee Braves).
- Custom Made, 34, American eventing horse, Olympic gold medallist (2000).
- Julie Gibson, 106, American actress (Nice Girl?, The Feminine Touch, Lucky Cowboy) and singer.
- Hans R. Griem, 90, German-American physicist.
- Robert Hickman, 76, Australian football player (Richmond).
- Tiny Hill, 92, New Zealand rugby union player (Canterbury, Counties, national team) and selector.
- Giya Kancheli, 84, Georgian composer (Unusual Exhibition, Don't Grieve, Mimino).
- Jafar Kashani, 74, Iranian footballer (Shahin, Persepolis, national team), heart attack.
- John Kirby, 79, American attorney, namesake of Kirby, myelodysplastic syndrome.
- Paul LeBlanc, 73, Canadian makeup artist (Amadeus, No Country for Old Men, Return of the Jedi), Oscar winner (1985).
- Ed Maley, 87, American judoka.
- Robert Odle, 75, American public servant, cancer.
- Beth Palmer, 67, American bridge player, breast cancer.
- Isaac Promise, 31, Nigerian footballer (Gençlerbirliği, Antalyaspor, national team), Olympic silver medallist (2008), heart failure.
- Hanno Selg, 87, Estonian modern pentathlete, Olympic silver medallist (1960).
- Kim Shattuck, 56, American singer, songwriter and musician (The Muffs, The Pandoras, Pixies), amyotrophic lateral sclerosis.
- Hargovind Laxmishanker Trivedi, 87, Indian nephrologist.
- Matthew Wong, 35, Canadian painter, suicide.
- Alan Zaslove, 91, American animation director and producer (Darkwing Duck, Aladdin, Chip 'n Dale: Rescue Rangers).
- Ezra Zilkha, 94, American financier and philanthropist.

=== 3 ===
- Márta Balogh, 76, Hungarian handball player (Budapesti Spartacus SC, national team), world champion (1965).
- Vinnie Bell, 87, American inventor and guitarist.
- John Buchanan, 88, Canadian politician, MLA (1967–1990) and Premier of Nova Scotia (1978–1990).
- Lewis Dauber, 70, American actor (The Fall Guy), liver cancer.
- Dana Fradon, 97, American cartoonist (The New Yorker), liver cancer.
- Diogo Freitas do Amaral, 78, Portuguese politician, Acting Prime Minister (1980–1981), Minister of National Defence (1981–1983) and Foreign Affairs (1980–1981 and 2005–2006).
- Philip Gips, 88, American graphic designer and film poster artist (Alien, Rosemary's Baby, Downhill Racer).
- Coluthur Gopalan, 100, Indian nutritionist.
- Hu Yamei, 96, Chinese physician and leukemia researcher, President of Beijing Children's Hospital (1982–1989).
- Percy Lewis, 90, Trinidadian-born British Olympic boxer (1952).
- Stephen J. Lukasik, 88, American physicist, respiratory failure.
- Philip K. Lundeberg, 96, American naval historian and World War II veteran, last survivor of the USS Frederick C. Davis sinking.
- Hussein Adel Madani, Iraqi cartoonist and political activist, shot.
- Teresa Maryańska, 82, Polish paleontologist.
- A. Grace Lee Mims, 89, American singer and radio personality.
- Bob Nettle, 95, American politician.
- Ignacio Noguer Carmona, 88, Spanish Roman Catholic prelate, Bishop of Guadix (1976–1990) and Huelva (1993–2006).
- Roger Taillibert, 93, French architect (Parc des Princes, Olympic Stadium Montreal), complications from a fall.
- Wei Zhongquan, 81, Chinese satellite engineer, chief designer of the Fengyun-2 and Yaogan-1 satellites.

=== 4 ===
- Ed Ackerson, 54, American singer-songwriter, musician (Polara, Antenna) and record producer, pancreatic cancer.
- Peter Beckwith, 80, American Anglican prelate, Bishop of Springfield (1992–2010).
- Steve Bickerstaff, 73, American lawyer and legal scholar.
- Glen Brown, 75, Jamaican reggae musician and record producer.
- Mikhail Biryukov, 27, Russian tennis player, suicide
- Diahann Carroll, 84, American actress (Julia, Dynasty, Claudine), Tony winner (1962), cancer.
- Amaro Alexandre da Luz, 85, Cape Verdean politician, minister of finance (1975–1977).
- Bryce Gaudry, 76, Australian politician, MLA (1991–2007), pancreatic cancer.
- Margaret Lyons, 95, Canadian radio executive, assisted suicide.
- Satya Priya Mahathero, 89, Bangladeshi Buddhist monk and social worker.
- Bill McKnight, 79, Canadian politician, MP (1979–1993).
- Stephen Moore, 81, British actor (A Bridge Too Far, The Last Place on Earth, The Hitchhiker's Guide to the Galaxy).
- Fred Ohene-Kena, 83, Ghanaian politician.
- Elmer Rees, 77, Welsh mathematician.
- Enno Röder, 83, German Olympic skier (1960, 1964).
- Gerald Sacks, 86, American logician and mathematician.
- James Schmerer, 81, American television writer and producer (MacGyver, CHiPs, The High Chaparral), complications of a stroke.
- Alberto Testa, 96, Italian dancer and choreographer.
- Bob Tufts, 63, American baseball player (Kansas City Royals, San Francisco Giants), multiple myeloma.
- Zhang Guobao, 74, Chinese politician, Director of the National Energy Administration (2007–2011).
- Zhang Siying, 94, Chinese engineer, member of the Chinese Academy of Sciences.

=== 5 ===
- Lee Botts, 91, American environmentalist.
- Dick Clark, 86, American politician.
- Dave Cummings, 79, American actor.
- Dolores Dorn, 85, American actress (The Bounty Hunter, Underworld U.S.A.).
- Andy Etchebarren, 76, American baseball player (Baltimore Orioles, California Angels, Milwaukee Brewers).
- Amalia Fuentes, 79, Filipino actress (Rodora, My Only Love, Kahit Isang Saglit), cardiac arrest.
- Marcello Giordani, 56, Italian operatic tenor, heart attack.
- Gary Goldschneider, 80, American astrologer and pianist.
- David Greaves, 73, English snooker player.
- Tony Hoar, 87, British racing cyclist, cancer.
- Larry Junstrom, 70, American bassist (Lynyrd Skynyrd, 38 Special).
- Kang Laiyi, 83, Chinese epidemiologist.
- Henry Keizer, 58, Dutch politician, Chairman of the People's Party for Freedom and Democracy (2014–2017).
- Blaine Lindgren, 80, American sprinter, Olympic silver medalist (1964).
- Roger Mayorga, 73, Nicaraguan footballer (Motagua, national team), heart attack.
- Eloy Pérez, 32, American boxer.
- Philip J. Prygoski, 71, American legal scholar.
- Vijay Sardeshmukh, 67, Indian classical vocalist, cancer.
- Sally Soames, 82, English photographer.
- Philippe Vandevelde, 62, Belgian comics writer (Le Petit Spirou, Soda, Spirou et Fantasio), heart attack.

=== 6 ===
- Abdulaziz bin Abdullah Al Zamil, 77, Saudi Arabian oil executive, Chairman of Saudi International Petrochemical Company (since 2004).
- Ginger Baker, 80, English Hall of Fame drummer (Cream, Blind Faith, Ginger Baker's Air Force), subject of Beware of Mr. Baker.
- Paul Bircher, 90, British rower, Olympic silver medallist (1948).
- Yevgeny Bushmin, 61, Russian politician.
- Ciaran Carson, 70, Northern Irish poet, lung cancer.
- Vlasta Chramostová, 92, Czech actress (The Trap, The Cassandra Cat, The Cremator).
- Seán Clohessy, 87, Irish hurler (Tullaroan, Kilkenny).
- Ezequiel Esperón, 23, Argentine footballer (Grêmio, Atlante), fall.
- Joseph Gourmelon, 81, French politician, Deputy (1981–1993).
- Stuart Heydinger, 92, British photojournalist.
- Masaichi Kaneda, 86, Japanese Hall of Fame baseball player (Kokutetsu Swallows, Yomiuri Giants) and manager (Lotte Orions), sepsis.
- Khenpo Karthar Rinpoche, 95, Tibetan Karma Kagyu lama, abbot of Karma Triyana Dharmachakra (since 1976).
- Martin Lauer, 82, German athlete, Olympic champion (1960).
- Neale Lavis, 89, Australian equestrian, Olympic champion (1960).
- Eddie Lumsden, 83, Australian rugby league player (St. George Dragons, Manly Sea Eagles, national team).
- John Mbiti, 87, Kenyan-born Swiss scholar.
- Samvel Mnatsyan, 29, Russian ice hockey player (Barys Astana, HC Neftekhimik Nizhnekamsk, Admiral Vladivostok), cancer.
- Bernard Muna, 79, Cameroonian politician, Deputy Prosecutor of the International Criminal Tribunal for Rwanda (1997–2001), heart disease.
- Karen Pendleton, 73, American actress (The Mickey Mouse Club), heart attack.
- David Petel, 98, Iraqi-born Israeli politician, member of the Knesset (1959–1969).
- Richard W. Pfeiffer, 70, American LGBT rights activist.
- Paul Gerhardt Rosenblatt, 91, American judge.
- S. A. Stepanek, 59, American poet.
- Stephen Swid, 78, American performance rights executive (SESAC), complications from frontotemporal degeneration.
- Rip Taylor, 88, American actor (The $1.98 Beauty Show, Chatterbox, Down to Earth) and comedian.

=== 7 ===
- Ovide Alakannuark, 80, Canadian politician, MLA (1999–2004).
- Harvey Benge, 75, New Zealand photographer.
- Herman Berendsen, 85, Dutch chemist.
- Beppe Bigazzi, 86, Italian journalist and restaurateur.
- Chen Zhongyi, 96, Chinese civil engineering professor and politician, Vice Chairman of the Taiwan Democratic Self-Government League.
- Warren William Eginton, 95, American judge (District Court for the District of Connecticut, 1979–1992).
- Abrar Fahad, 21, Bangladeshi student, murdered by Bangladesh Chhatra League activists.
- Arnold Heine, 93, New Zealand glaciologist and mountaineer.
- Barry Jackson, 82, English rugby union player (Broughton Park, Lancashire, national team).
- Willy Otto Jordan, 99, Brazilian Olympic swimmer.
- Ed Kalafat, 87, American basketball player (Minneapolis Lakers).
- Krishnamoorthy, 55, Indian Tamil actor, heart attack.
- Janusz Kondratiuk, 76, Kazakh-born Polish film director.
- Jari Laukkanen, 57, Finnish Olympic cross-country skier (1988).
- Tony Mulhearn, 80, British political campaigner, lung disease.
- Ulick O'Connor, 90, Irish writer.
- Stephen Okumu, 61, Kenyan Olympic boxer (1984).
- Pepe Oneto, 77, Spanish journalist (Cambio 16) and writer.
- Eugène Saccomano, 83, French journalist.
- Eva Sisth, 78, Swedish Olympic sprint canoer.
- Wilson Sutherland, 84, British mathematician.
- Ella Vogelaar, 69, Dutch politician and trade union leader, Minister for Housing, Communities and Integration (2007–2008), suicide.
- Makoto Wada, 83, Japanese illustrator, essayist and film director (Mahjong hōrōki, Kaitō Ruby), pneumonia.

=== 8 ===
- Eduard Admetlla i Lázaro, 95, Spanish scuba diver, designer and photographer.
- Serafim Fernandes de Araújo, 95, Brazilian Roman Catholic cardinal, Archbishop of Belo Horizonte (1986–2004), complications from pneumonia.
- John Bennett, 77, Australian politician, Attorney-General of Tasmania (1986–1989).
- Litia Cakobau, 78, Fijian politician and tribal chief.
- Carlos Celdran, 46, Filipino cultural activist and performance artist, cardiac arrest.
- Ed Cray, 86, American journalist and biographer.
- Francis S. Currey, 94, American technical sergeant, Medal of Honor recipient.
- Molly Duncan, 74, Scottish saxophonist (Average White Band), cancer.
- Georgette Elgey, 90, French journalist and historian.
- Eberhard Ferstl, 86, German Olympic bronze medallist field hockey player (1956).
- Ted Green, 79, Canadian ice hockey player (Boston Bruins, Winnipeg Jets) and coach (Edmonton Oilers).
- Chip Healy, 72, American football player (St. Louis Cardinals).
- Roland Janson, 80, Swedish actor (Sällskapsresan, Rederiet).
- Ryan Nicholson, 47, Canadian film director (Gutterballs) and visual effects artist (The Predator, Blade: Trinity), brain cancer.
- Rosalie Passovoy, 89, American tennis player.
- Helen Shingler, 100, British actress (Quiet Weekend, The Lady with a Lamp, Room in the House).
- Harcharan Singh, 81, Indian cricketer (Services, Southern Punjab).
- Raymond Squires, 93, Canadian politician.
- Helen Stother, 64, English cricketer (England).
- Sammy Taylor, 86, American baseball player (Chicago Cubs, New York Mets).
- Michael Uhlmann, 79, American political scientist.
- Louis Waller, 84, Australian legal scholar.
- Split Waterman, 96, English speedway rider.
- Reg Watson, 93, Australian television producer (Prisoner, Neighbours, Sons and Daughters) and screenwriter.
- Quade Winter, 68, American composer and opera singer.
- Saadi Younis, 69, Iraqi footballer (national team), heart attack.
- Talaat Zakaria, 59, Egyptian actor and comedian (Call Mama, Sayed the Romantic), inflammation of the brain.

=== 9 ===
- Richard Askey, 86, American mathematician, discoverer of Askey–Wilson polynomials, Askey scheme and Askey–Gasper inequality.
- Dorothea Buck, 102, German author.
- Éamonn Burns, 56, Northern Irish Gaelic footballer (Down).
- John W. Corso, 89, American production designer (Coal Miner's Daughter, The Breakfast Club, Ferris Bueller's Day Off).
- Robert W. Estill, 92, American Episcopal prelate, Bishop of North Carolina (1983–1994).
- Reino Fagerlund, 65, Finnish Olympic judoka (1980).
- Thomas Flanagan, 88, Irish-born American Roman Catholic prelate, Auxiliary Bishop of San Antonio (1998–2005).
- Jill Freedman, 79, American photographer, cancer.
- Lorand Gaspar, 94, Hungarian-born French poet.
- Andrés Gimeno, 82, Spanish tennis player, French Open winner (1972).
- Robert Guestier Goelet, 96, French-born American banker (Chemical Bank) and philanthropist.
- Anne Hart, 84, Canadian author.
- Samuel Hynes, 95, American author, heart failure.
- Eugene F. Lynch, 87, American judge.
- James O. Mason, 89, American physician, public health administrator and Acting Surgeon General of the United States (1989–1990).
- David C. Meade, 79, American major general.
- Ion Moraru, 90, Moldovan writer and political activist (Sabia Dreptății).
- Filippo Penati, 66, Italian politician, President of the Province of Milano (2004–2009), Mayor of Sesto San Giovanni (1994–2001).
- Murray Rosenblatt, 93, American statistician and academic.
- John Baptist Sequeira, 89, Indian Roman Catholic prelate, Bishop of Chikmagalur (1987–2006).
- Satnarine Sharma, 76, Trinidadian judge, Chief Justice (2002–2008).
- Erling Steineide, 81, Norwegian Olympic cross country skier (1964).
- Jan Szyszko, 75, Polish politician, academic and forester, Minister of Environment (1997–1999; 2005–2007; 2015–2018).
- David Weisman, 77, American film producer (Kiss of the Spider Woman) and author.
- John Williams, 79, Australian football player (Carlton).
- Yang Enze, 99, Chinese telecommunications engineer and academic, cerebral hemorrhage.
- Louis-Christophe Zaleski-Zamenhof, 94, Polish-born French civil engineer and Esperantist.

=== 10 ===
- Moji Akinfenwa, 89, Nigerian politician, senator (1999–2003).
- Pierre Albrecht, 88, Swiss Olympic basketball player (1952).
- Sir Desmond Cassidi, 94, British admiral, Commander-in-Chief, Naval Home Command (1983–1984).
- Ugo Colombo, 79, Italian racing cyclist.
- Marie Darby, 79, New Zealand marine biologist.
- Md. Golam Mostofa, 70, Bangladeshi freedom fighter.
- William J. Hamilton, 86, American politician, member of the New Jersey General Assembly (1972–1978) and Senate (1978–1982).
- Dominic Jala, 68, Indian Roman Catholic prelate, Archbishop of Shillong (since 1999), traffic collision.
- Richard Jeranian, 98, Armenian-born French painter and draftsman.
- Tarek Kamel, 57, Egyptian politician and computer engineer, cancer.
- Juliette Kaplan, 80, British actress (Last of the Summer Wine, Coronation Street), cancer.
- John Kirkham, 84, British Anglican prelate, Bishop of Sherborne (1976–2001) and Bishop to the Forces (1992–2001).
- Enrique Moreno, 63, Mexican-born American lawyer, complications from cancer.
- Trinidad Morgades Besari, 88, Equatorial Guinean writer.
- Marie-José Nat, 79, French actress (A Woman in White, Violins at the Ball, La Vérité), cancer.
- Jon Peterson, 65, American politician.
- Paul Polak, 86, American psychiatrist and entrepreneur, heart failure.
- Gordon Robertson, 93, Canadian ice hockey player, Olympic champion (1952).
- Miklós Szabó, 81, Hungarian sports shooter (1960).
- Stuart Taylor, 72, English footballer (Bristol Rovers).
- Joseph E. Tregoning, 78, American politician, member of the Wisconsin State Assembly (1967–1990).
- Tsai Ying-wen, 67, Taiwanese political scientist, gastroesophageal reflux disease.

=== 11 ===
- Sam Bobrick, 87, American television writer (Saved by the Bell, Gomer Pyle, U.S.M.C., The Smothers Brothers Comedy Hour), stroke.
- Mac Christensen, 85, American clothier, president of the Mormon Tabernacle Choir (2000–2012).
- Russell Doolittle, 88, American biochemist, complications from metastatic melanoma.
- Woodie Flowers, 76, American mechanical engineering professor (Massachusetts Institute of Technology).
- Robert Forster, 78, American actor (Jackie Brown, The Black Hole, Medium Cool), brain cancer.
- John Giorno, 82, American poet and performance artist, subject of Sleep, heart attack.
- Kadri Gopalnath, 69, Indian saxophonist, cardiac arrest.
- Joseph Helszajn, 85, Belgian-born British electrical engineer.
- Aubrey Kuruppu, 74, Sri Lankan cricketer.
- Alexei Leonov, 85, Russian cosmonaut (Voskhod 2), first person to walk in space.
- Ram Mohan, 88, Indian animator (The Chess Player, Kaamchor, Meena).
- Michael Mott, 88, British-born American poet, novelist and biographer.
- Ali Nakhjavani, 100, Azerbaijani-born Iranian Baháʼí Faith leader.
- Yoshinobu Nishioka, 96, Japanese art director (The Twilight Samurai, An Actor's Revenge, Zatoichi Meets Yojimbo).
- Pasupuleti Purnachandra Rao, 71, Indian film historian (Silent Cinema (1895-1930)) and critic.
- Oriano Ripoli, 95, Italian politician, Mayor of Pisa (1985–1986).
- Heather Robson, 91, New Zealand badminton and tennis player.
- Ettore Spalletti, 79, Italian artist, heart attack.
- James Hart Stern, 55, American civil rights activist, cancer.
- Rita Thomson, 85, Scottish nurse.
- Richard Tracey, 71, Australian judge and military officer, Judge Advocate General (2007–2014), cancer.
- Gillian Trumper, 83, English-born Canadian politician and coroner, complications from renal failure.
- Walter G. Vincenti, 102, American engineer.
- Gundeboina Rammurthy Yadav, 71, Indian politician, MLA (1994–1999).

=== 12 ===
- Mel Aull, 90, Canadian football player.
- Kate Braverman, 70, American author, cardiac arrest.
- Joyce Cansfield, 90, British crossword compiler.
- E. A. Carmean, 74, American art curator and historian, cancer.
- Carlo Croccolo, 92, Italian actor, voice actor, director and screenwriter. (47 morto che parla, After the Fox, Three Men and a Leg)
- Sara Danius, 57, Swedish literary critic and philosopher, member (2013–2019) and Permanent Secretary (2015–2018) of the Swedish Academy, breast cancer.
- Ding Shisun, 92, Chinese mathematician and politician, President of Peking University (1984–1989), Chairman of the China Democratic League (1996–2005).
- Nanni Galli, 79, Italian racing driver.
- María Luisa García, 100, Spanish chef and cookbook author, proponent of Asturian cuisine.
- Bob Goin, 81, American college sports administrator, athletics director (Florida State University, University of Cincinnati).
- Dallas Harms, 84, Canadian country musician.
- Jackie Hernández, 79, Cuban baseball player (Kansas City Royals, Pittsburgh Pirates), World Series champion (1971), cancer.
- James Hughes-Hallett, 70, British business executive (Swire Group).
- Hevrin Khalaf, 34, Syrian politician and activist, Secretary General of the Kurdish Future Movement in Syria, shot.
- Milcho Leviev, 81, Bulgarian jazz pianist.
- Ronald Markarian, 88, American major general.
- Emilio Nicolas Sr., 88, Mexican-born American television station owner (KWEX).
- Glen Pettinger, 91, Canadian Olympic basketball player.
- Alison Prince, 88, British children's writer.
- Norman Schofield, 75, Scottish-American political scientist.
- Yoshihisa Yoshikawa, 83, Japanese sport shooter, Olympic bronze medallist (1960, 1964), heart failure.

=== 13 ===
- John Algeo, 89, American linguist.
- William T. Allen, 75, American law academic.
- Hideo Azuma, 69, Japanese manga artist, esophageal cancer.
- Scotty Bowers, 96, American author (Full Service) and pimp.
- Bobby Del Greco, 86, American baseball player (Pittsburgh Pirates, Philadelphia Phillies, Kansas City Athletics).
- Duan Qingbo, 55, Chinese archaeologist (Mausoleum of the First Qin Emperor), Dean of the School of Cultural Heritage of Northwest University (since 2017), kidney cancer.
- Raymond Fairchild, 80, American banjo player, heart attack.
- Helen Fix, 97, American politician.
- Jay Frank, 47, American music executive, founder of DigSin, cancer.
- Richard Huckle, 33, British convicted sex offender, strangled and stabbed.
- Charles Jencks, 80, American architect, cultural theorist (Post-modernism) and philanthropist, co-founder of Maggie's Centres.
- Mikheil Kobakhidze, 80, Georgian film director, screenwriter and composer.
- Sophia Kokosalaki, 47, Greek fashion designer, cancer.
- Ulrich Luz, 81, Swiss theologian.
- Vasim Mammadaliyev, 77, Azerbaijani theologian.
- Elias James Manning, 81, American-born Brazilian Roman Catholic prelate, Bishop of Valença (1990–2014).
- Goran Marković, 33, Serbian-born Montenegrin footballer (Željezničar Sarajevo, Čukarički, Zrinjski Mostar), fall.
- Adolfo Mexiac, 92, Mexican graphic artist.
- Włodzimierz Mucha, 63, Polish architect.
- Sucheta Nadkarni, 52, Indian management studies academic.
- Kanako Naito, 38, Japanese volleyball player.
- Theo Verbey, 60, Dutch composer.

=== 14 ===
- Harold Bloom, 89, American literary critic and writer (The Anxiety of Influence, The Western Canon: The Books and School of the Ages).
- Bohdan Butenko, 88, Polish cartoonist.
- Steve Cash, 73, American singer-songwriter, author and harmonica player (The Ozark Mountain Daredevils).
- Emmett Chappelle, 93, American scientist (NASA) and World War II veteran (Buffalo Soldier), kidney failure.
- Charles Dausabea, 59, Solomon Islands politician, MP (1990–1993, 1997–2001, 2006–2008).
- Karen Lynn Davidson, 76, American Latter-day Saint hymn writer, pancreatic cancer.
- Buckwheat Donahue, 68, American sportsman and tourism promoter.
- Deborah Duchon, 70, American anthropologist, complications from glioblastoma.
- Francisco Figueredo, 59, Paraguayan Olympic athlete (1984).
- Lou Frey, 85, American politician, member of the U.S. House of Representatives (1969–1979).
- Anke Fuchs, 82, German lawyer and politician, Federal Minister of Health (1982) and Vice President of the Bundestag (1998–2002).
- Danny Grant, 73, Canadian ice hockey player (Minnesota North Stars, Detroit Red Wings, Los Angeles Kings), Calder Memorial Trophy winner (1968).
- Rosemary Harris, 96, British author (The Moon in the Cloud).
- Igor Kaleshin, 67, Russian football player (Akhmat Grozny, Druzhba Maykop, Kuban Krasnodar) and manager (Kuban Krasnodar).
- Barun Mazumder, 77, Indian journalist and writer.
- Lorne Main, 89, Canadian tennis player.
- Desmond Park, 83, New Zealand cricketer.
- Bernice Robinson, 92, American Olympic hurdler.
- Baby Saroja, 88, Indian actress (Balayogini, Thyaga Bhoomi, Kamadhenu).
- Renato Scrollavezza, 92, Italian luthier.
- Cooper Snyder, 91, American politician, member of the Ohio Senate (1979–1996).
- Jeffrey Spalding, 67, Canadian artist, stroke.
- Karola Stotz, 56, German philosopher.
- Sulli, 25, South Korean singer (f(x)), songwriter and actress, suicide by hanging.
- Michael C. Thomas, 71, American entomologist.
- Gunnar Torvund, 71, Norwegian sculptor.
- John Wilson Nattubu Tsekooko, 76, Ugandan lawyer and judge.
- R. Tracy Walker, 82, American politician.
- Patrick Ward, 69, Australian actor (The Unisexers, The Chain Reaction, My Two Wives).
- Bob Will, 94, American Olympic rower (1948).
- Yvonne S. Wilson, 90, American politician, member of the Missouri House of Representatives (1999–2005) and Senate (2005–2010).

=== 15 ===
- Tamara Buciuceanu, 90, Romanian actress (Silent Wedding, Everybody in Our Family), heart disease.
- Cacho Castaña, 77, Argentine singer and actor (Los Hijos de López, Merry Christmas), lung disease.
- John Cavanagh, 98, British neurobiologist.
- Andrew Cowan, 82, Scottish rally driver and team owner (Ralliart).
- Hossein Dehlavi, 92, Iranian composer (Mana and Mani).
- Robert Louis Dressler, 92, American botanist.
- Stefan Edlis, 94, Austrian-born American art collector and philanthropist.
- Mary Stuart Gile, 83, American politician, member of the New Hampshire House of Representatives (1996–2019).
- Jiang Haokang, 84, Chinese aerospace engineer.
- R. Bruce Hoadley, 96, American materials scientist.
- Igo Kantor, 89, American film producer (Kingdom of the Spiders, Mutant, Act of Piracy) and post-production executive.
- Michael D. Reynolds, 65, American astronomer and educator.
- Song Soon-chun, 85, South Korean boxer, Olympic silver medallist (1956).

=== 16 ===
- Bonnie Averbach, 85–86, American mathematician.
- Ed Beck, 83, American basketball player (Kentucky Wildcats).
- Utpal Bhayani, 66, Indian playwright and critic.
- Paolo Bonaiuti, 79, Italian politician and journalist, MP (1996–2018).
- Bin Cheng, 98, Chinese-born British legal scholar, Dean of the UCL Faculty of Laws (1971–1973).
- John Clarke, 88, American actor (Days of Our Lives), complications from pneumonia.
- David E. Carlson, 77, American physicist.
- Patrick Day, 27, American professional boxer, brain injuries sustained in bout.
- Bernard Fisher, 101, American surgeon, pioneer in breast cancer treatment.
- Yehezkel Flomin, 84, Israeli politician, member of the Knesset (1974–1981).
- Arline Friscia, 84, American politician, member of the New Jersey General Assembly (1996–2004).
- Han Aiping, 57, Chinese Hall of Fame badminton player, lung cancer.
- Morton Mandel, 98, American industrial parts executive and philanthropist.
- Wilhelmena Rhodes Kelly, 72, American genealogist, kidney cancer.
- Volodymyr Mulyava, 82, Ukrainian politician, MP (1994–1998).
- Ángel Pérez García, 62, Spanish football player (Real Madrid, Elche) and manager (Sangonera), cancer.
- Robert Ramage, 84, British organic chemist.
- Harold Scheub, 88, American professor and folklorist of African cultures.
- Andrey Smirnov, 62, Russian swimmer, Olympic bronze medalist (1976).
- John Tate, 94, American mathematician (Tate's thesis, Tate conjecture, Tate cohomology group), Abel Prize winner (2010).

=== 17 ===
- Alicia Alonso, 98, Cuban prima ballerina, founder of the National Ballet.
- William Andre, 88, American Olympic fencer and pentathlete.
- Michael F. Armstrong, 86, American lawyer.
- Hildegard Bachert, 98, German-born American art dealer (Galerie St. Etienne) and gallery director.
- Michael Bowen, 89, British Roman Catholic prelate, Archbishop of Southwark (1977–2003).
- Zev Braun, 91, American film and television producer (Tour of Duty).
- Elijah Cummings, 68, American politician, member of the U.S. House of Representatives (since 1996) and Maryland House of Delegates (1983–1996).
- Alan Diamonstein, 88, American politician, member of the Virginia House of Delegates (1968–2002).
- Rom Harré, 91, New Zealand-born British philosopher and psychologist.
- Procter Ralph Hug Jr., 88, American federal judge.
- David King, 71, British graphic designer, cancer.
- Bob Kingsley, 80, American Hall of Fame radio host (American Country Countdown, Bob Kingsley's Country Top 40), bladder cancer.
- Márta Kurtág, 92, Hungarian pianist.
- Bill Macy, 97, American actor (Maude, The Producers, The Jerk).
- Göran Malmqvist, 95, Swedish linguist, sinologist and literary historian, member of the Swedish Academy.
- Lucretia W. McClure, 94, American medical librarian.
- Victor Mohica, 86, American actor (Blood In Blood Out).
- Ray Ogden, 77, American football player (Chicago Bears, St. Louis Cardinals, Atlanta Falcons).
- Edmundo Rada, Venezuelan politician, shot.
- Ray Santos, 90, American saxophonist and composer.
- William Timberlake, 76, American psychologist.
- Wendy Williams, 84, British actress (Crossroads, Doctor Who).

=== 18 ===
- Luiz Olavo Baptista, 81, Brazilian jurist.
- Sir John Boyd, 83, British diplomat, Ambassador to Japan (1992–1996).
- Thelma Childress, 93, American baseball player (Grand Rapids Chicks).
- Ed Clark, 93, American painter.
- Nicolás Díaz, 90, Chilean politician and cardiologist, senator (1990–1998) and Mayor of Rancagua (1963–1964, 1967–1968).
- James A. Donaldson, 78, American mathematician, heart disease.
- Michael Flaksman, 73, American cellist.
- Volker Hinz, 72, German photographer.
- Mark Hurd, 62, American technology executive, CEO of Hewlett-Packard (2005–2010) and Oracle Corporation (since 2014).
- Ahad Israfil, 47, American gunshot survivor.
- Rui Jordão, 67, Angolan-born Portuguese footballer (Benfica, Sporting CP, national team), heart disease.
- Kalidas Karmakar, 73, Bangladeshi painter and printmaker.
- William Milliken, 97, American politician, Governor of Michigan (1969–1983).
- Lou Palmer, 84, American sportscaster (SportsCenter, WFAN), lung cancer.
- Mike Reilly, 77, American football player (Chicago Bears, Minnesota Vikings).
- Mikhail Semyonov, 80, Russian politician.
- Meir Shamgar, 94, Israeli lawyer and politician, Chief Justice of the Supreme Court (1983–1995).
- Victor Sheymov, 73, Russian cybersecurity innovator and KGB officer.
- Kamlesh Tiwari, 45, Indian politician, shot.
- Bruce Walton, 68, American football player (Dallas Cowboys).
- Zhao Yannian, 90, Chinese politician, Vice Minister of the State Ethnic Affairs Commission (1986–2003).

=== 19 ===
- Adma d'Heurle, 95, Lebanese-born American psychologist.
- Robert Chef d'Hôtel, 97, French Olympic sprinter.
- Erhard Eppler, 92, German politician, Minister for Economic Development (1968–1974).
- Margaret Gillett, 89, Australian-Canadian academic.
- Salvador Giner, 85, Spanish sociologist, President of the Institute of Catalan Studies (2005–2013).
- E. Bruce Heilman, 93, American educator and veterans advocate, President of the University of Richmond (1971–1986, 1987–1988).
- Youssef Hourany, 88, Lebanese archaeologist and historian.
- Jakir Khan, 56, Bangladeshi film director, cancer.
- Ishmael Levenston, 79, Saban politician, member of the Island Council (1975–1979, 1983–1987) and founder of the Saba Labour Party.
- Joseph Lombardo, 90, American mobster, consigliere of the Chicago Outfit.
- Theodor Wonja Michael, 94, German Africanist and journalist.
- Mikhail Motsak, 69, Russian naval officer.
- Nathan Nurgitz, 85, Canadian politician.
- Deborah Orr, 57, Scottish journalist (The Guardian, The Independent), breast cancer.
- Rini Price, 78, American painter.
- Carlos Suárez, 73, Spanish cinematographer (Unmarried Mothers, Rowing with the Wind), Goya Award winner (1988).
- Alexander Volkov, 52, Russian tennis player.

=== 20 ===
- Herbert Chappell, 85, British conductor, composer and film-maker.
- Eric Cooper, 52, American baseball umpire, blood clot.
- Thomas D'Alesandro III, 90, American politician, Mayor of Baltimore (1967–1971), complications from a stroke.
- Arnold Gosewich, 85, Canadian literary agent, book publishing consultant and record industry executive.
- Sir Peter Graham, 85, British lawyer and parliamentary draftsman, First Parliamentary Counsel (1991–1994).
- Joseph Houssa, 89, Belgian politician, senator (1988–1995) and Mayor of Spa (1983–2018).
- Huang Yong Ping, 65, Chinese-born French avant-garde installation artist and sculptor.
- Rufus E. Jones, 79, American politician, member of the Tennessee House of Representatives (1981–1996).
- Mohamed al-Amin Khalifa, 70, Sudanese military officer and politician, chairman of the National Transitional Council (1992–1996).
- Asbjørn Liland, 83, Norwegian politician.
- Norman Myers, 85, British environmentalist, dementia.
- Aquilino Pimentel Jr., 85, Filipino politician, President of the Senate (2000–2001) and senator (1987–1992, 1998–2010), lymphoma and pneumonia.
- Robert I. Price, 98, American vice admiral (US Coast Guard).
- Gonzalo de Jesús Rivera Gómez, 85, Colombian Roman Catholic prelate, Auxiliary Bishop of Medellín (1998–2010).
- Martin Tenni, 85, Australian politician, member of the Queensland Legislative Assembly (1974–1989).
- Nick Tosches, 69, American journalist, music critic and writer (Country, The Devil and Sonny Liston, The Last Opium Den).
- Dottie Wham, 94, American politician, member of the Colorado General Assembly (1984–2000).
- Mellony Wijesinghe, 17, Sri Lankan netball player, leukemia.

=== 21 ===
- Gilberto Aceves Navarro, 88, Mexican sculptor and painter.
- Willie Brown, 78, American Hall of Fame football player (Denver Broncos, Oakland Raiders) and coach.
- Michael Detlefsen, 71, American philosopher.
- John M. Downs, 82, American courtroom sketch artist, lymphoma.
- Josip Elic, 98, American actor (The Twilight Zone, One Flew Over the Cuckoo's Nest, Black Rain), complications from a fall.
- Bengt Feldreich, 94, Swedish journalist and television host (From All of Us to All of You), pneumonia.
- Jerry Fogel, 83, American actor (The Mothers-in-Law, The White Shadow).
- Gerald Freihofner, 73, Austrian journalist.
- Mike Hebert, 75, American volleyball coach (Minnesota Golden Gophers).
- Gillian Jagger, 88, British sculptor and painter.
- Nissim Karelitz, 93, Israeli rabbi, heart disease.
- Garry Koehler, 64, Australian country musician and songwriter, cancer.
- Taras Kutovy, 43, Ukrainian politician, MP (2012–2014) and Minister of Agrarian Policy and Food (2016–2018), helicopter crash.
- Kent Larsson, 67, Swedish Olympic rower (1980).
- Lho Shin-yong, 89, South Korean politician, Prime Minister (1985–1987) and Minister of Foreign Affairs (1980–1982).
- Ingo Maurer, 87, German industrial designer.
- Aila Meriluoto, 95, Finnish poet, writer and translator.
- Brian Noble, 83, British Roman Catholic prelate, Bishop of Shrewsbury (1995–2010).
- Reginald Tate, 65, American politician, member of the Tennessee Senate (2006–2018).
- Florence Signaigo Wagner, 100, American botanist.
- Camille Zaidan, 75, Lebanese Maronite hierarch, Archbishop of Antelias (since 2012).

=== 22 ===
- Christos Archontidis, 81, Greek football manager (Korinthos, PAOK, national team).
- George Brancato, 88, American football player and coach (Ottawa Rough Riders).
- Manfred Bruns, 85, German attorney and LGBT rights activist.
- Al Burton, 91, American television composer (The Facts of Life, Diff'rent Strokes, Charles in Charge).
- Ed Cherney, 69, American recording engineer, record producer and Grammy winner (1994, 2003, 2016, 2018), cancer.
- Chris, 9, Australian sheep, world record holder for heaviest fleece.
- Vicki Funk, 71, American botanist.
- Greetje Galliard, Dutch Olympic swimmer.
- Til Gardeniers-Berendsen, 94, Dutch politician, Minister of Social Work (1977–1981) and of Health (1981–1982), member of the Council of State (1983–1995).
- Don Gruber, 89, American politician.
- Guo Dehong, 77, Chinese historian.
- Ole Henrik Laub, 81, Danish novelist, stomach cancer.
- Raymond Leppard, 92, British conductor, director of the Indianapolis Symphony Orchestra (1987–2001).
- George Masso, 92, American jazz musician.
- Mike McClennan, 75, New Zealand rugby league player (Auckland, national team) and coach (St Helens). (body found on this date)
- Dorylas Moreau, 72, Canadian Roman Catholic prelate, Bishop of Rouyn-Noranda (2001–2019).
- Sadako Ogata, 92, Japanese academic and diplomat, United Nations High Commissioner for Refugees (1990–2000).
- Lelio Orci, 82, Italian endocrinologist.
- Bachirou Osséni, 33, Beninese footballer (Vitória, Diegem Sport, national team).
- Rolando Panerai, 95, Italian baritone singer.
- Wilhelmina Reuben-Cooke, 72, American legal scholar and civil rights activist.
- Miguel Saiz, 70, Argentine politician, Governor of Río Negro (2003–2011).
- Marieke Vervoort, 40, Belgian wheelchair racer, Paralympic champion (2012), assisted suicide.
- Hans Zender, 82, German conductor and composer (Stephen Climax).
- Zeng Rongsheng, 95, Chinese geophysicist, member of the Chinese Academy of Sciences.
- Therese Zenz, 87, German sprint canoer, Olympic silver medallist (1956, 1960).
- Jo Ann Zimmerman, 82, American politician, Lieutenant Governor of Iowa (1987–1991).

=== 23 ===
- Roberta Fiorentini, 70, Italian actress (Boris, The Family Friend, Natale a cinque stelle).
- Duncan Forbes, 78, Scottish footballer (Colchester United, Norwich City), complications from Alzheimer's disease.
- Vicki Gregory, 51, British microbiologist, cancer.
- J. Rogers Hollingsworth, 87, American historian and sociologist.
- Ji Xiaocheng, 95, Chinese pediatrician, introduced perinatal medicine to China.
- Demetrio Jiménez Sánchez-Mariscal, 56, Spanish Roman Catholic prelate, Prelate of Cafayate (since 2014).
- Santos Juliá, 79, Spanish historian and sociologist (National University of Distance Education).
- James W. Montgomery, 98, American Episcopalian prelate, Bishop of Chicago (1971–1987).
- David O. Morgan, 74, British historian.
- Michel Nihoul, 78, Belgian businessman and convicted criminal.
- Bernie Parrish, 83, American football player (Cleveland Browns).
- George Proud, 80, Canadian politician, MP (1988–2000).
- Kingsley Rock, 81, Montserratian cricketer (national team).
- Fides Romanin, 84, Italian Olympic cross country skier (1952, 1956).
- Hansheinz Schneeberger, 93, Swiss violinist.
- Tom Stevens, 63, American politician, founder of the Objectivist Party.
- Francis A. Sullivan, 97, American theologian.
- Keyth Talley, 29, American sprinter.
- Phil Taylor, 88, English rugby player.
- Francis Tresham, 83, British game designer.
- Martin Vosseler, 71, Swiss renewable energy advocate, co-founder of Physicians for Social Responsibility, traffic collision.
- Xiao Han, 92, Chinese politician and coal executive, Minister of Coal Industry (1977–1980), Chairman of China Huaneng Group and Shenhua Group (1995–1998).
- Xie Gaohua, 87, Chinese politician, Party Secretary of Yiwu (1982–1984), founded the Yiwu Market.
- Alfred Znamierowski, 79, Polish vexillologist.

=== 24 ===
- John W. Barker, 86, American historian.
- Michael Blumlein, 71, American writer and physician.
- Cookie Brinkman, 70, American football player (Cleveland Browns).
- Janusz Brzozowski, 84, Polish-born Canadian computer scientist.
- Bucky Curtis, 90, American football player (Toronto Argonauts, Cleveland Browns).
- Tomas Dy-Liacco, 98, Filipino-American electrical engineer.
- Walter Franco, 74, Brazilian singer and composer, stroke.
- Ray Jenkins, 89, American journalist.
- Leroy Johnson, 91, American politician, member of the Georgia State Senate (1963–1975).
- John G. Keane, 89, American business executive and government official.
- Ron Rose, 75, American poker player.
- Patricia de Souza, 55, Peruvian writer.
- Norm Stoneburgh, 84, Canadian football player (Toronto Argonauts).
- George Tarasovic, 89, American football player (Pittsburgh Steelers, Philadelphia Eagles, Denver Broncos).
- Ruth van Heyningen, 101, British biochemist.
- Kaoru Yachigusa, 88, Japanese actress (Samurai Trilogy, Hachiko Monogatari, Agatha Christie's Great Detectives Poirot and Marple), pancreatic cancer.

=== 25 ===
- Earl Balmer, 83, American racecar driver.
- John Allan Boyd, 89, Scottish footballer (Aberdeen, Queen's Park, national team).
- Renzo Burini, 92, Italian footballer (Lazio, Milan, national team).
- Chou Wen-chung, 96, Chinese-born American composer.
- T. Loren Christianson, 93, American politician.
- Anwar Congo, 82, Indonesian gangster.
- Gerry Dalton, 84, Irish sculptor. (death announced on this date)
- Murray Feshbach, 90, American economist.
- Salvador Freixedo, 96, Spanish ufologist and priest.
- Peter H. Hassrick, 78, American artist and author, cancer.
- Hu Dujing, 106, Chinese plant physiologist, agronomist and educator.
- Victor J. Joos, 81, American politician.
- William Loren Katz, 92, American historian and author.
- Ghulam Mohammad Lot, 90, Pakistani politician, MPA (1993–1996), cardiac arrest.
- Rafael Ninyoles i Monllor, 76, Spanish Catalan sociolinguist.
- Dilip Parikh, 82, Indian politician, Chief Minister of Gujarat (1997–1998).
- Mário Sabino, 47, Brazilian Olympic judoka (2000, 2004), shot.
- Humayun Kabir Sadhu, 37, Bangladeshi television director, screenwriter and actor, stroke.
- Vittorio Seghezzi, 95, Italian racing cyclist.
- Kafil Uddin Sonar, 75, Bangladeshi politician, MP (1988–1990).
- Carlo Strenger, 61, Swiss-Israeli psychologist and philosopher.
- Joe Sun, 76, American country singer ("Old Flames Can't Hold a Candle to You").
- Don Valentine, 87, American venture capitalist (Sequoia Capital).
- Janko Vučinić, 53, Montenegrin boxer and politician, MP (since 2012) and President of the Workers' Party (since 2015).
- Rudolf G. Wagner, 77, German sinologist.
- Janet Yee, 85, Singaporean social worker.

=== 26 ===
- Paul André Albert, 93, American metallurgist.
- Paul Barrere, 71, American rock singer and guitarist (Little Feat), liver cancer.
- Enriqueta Basilio, 71, Mexican Olympic sprinter and hurdler (1968).
- Clinton Bernard, 89, Trinidadian judge, Chief Justice (1985–1995).
- Raymond Ward Bissell, 83, American art historian.
- Daniel W. Dobberpuhl, 74, American electrical engineer.
- Jack Dunnett, 97, British politician and football administrator, MP for Nottingham Central (1964–1974) and Nottingham East (1974–1983).
- Robert Evans, 89, American film producer (Chinatown, Marathon Man) and studio executive (Paramount Pictures).
- Gao Di, 91, Chinese politician, Communist Party Secretary of Jilin.
- Edward J. Green, 71, American economist.
- John Howey, 87, American architect.
- Thangeswary Kathiraman, 67, Sri Lankan politician, MP (2004–2010).
- Mārtiņš Ķibilds, 45, Latvian journalist and television host (Gribi būt miljonārs?).
- Chuck Meriwether, 63, American baseball umpire, cancer.
- V. Nanammal, 99, Indian yoga teacher, complications from a fall.
- Pan Handian, 98, Chinese legal scholar and translator (Lifetime Achievement Award in Translation).
- Gregory E. Pyle, 70, American politician, Chief of the Choctaw Nation of Oklahoma (1997–2014).
- Pascale Roberts, 89, French actress (The Women Couldn't Care Less, The Sleeping Car Murders, Plus belle la vie).
- Thaddeus Seymour, 91, American academic.
- John Stauffer, 94, American politician.
- John D. Turner, 81, American historian.
- Hiromi Yoshida, 70, Japanese politician, member of the House of Councillors (since 2001), brain cancer.

=== 27 ===
- Walter Ausserdorfer, 80, Italian luger, Olympic bronze medalist (1964).
- Abu Bakr al-Baghdadi, 48, Iraqi insurgent and cleric, Emir of the Islamic State of Iraq (2010–2013) and Leader of ISIL (since 2013), suicide by explosive vest.
- Abul-Hasan al-Muhajir, Saudi spokesman of ISIL (since 2016), airstrike.
- Roger Ballenger, 69, American politician, member of the Oklahoma Senate (2006–2014), melanoma.
- Vladimir Bukovsky, 76, Russian-born British human rights activist and political dissident, heart attack.
- Tim Chambers, 54, American college baseball coach (UNLV Rebels).
- Stephen P. Cohen, 83, American political scientist and security expert.
- John Conyers, 90, American politician, Dean (2015–2017) and member of the U.S. House of Representatives (1965–2017).
- Kelly C. Crabb, 72, American sports and entertainment lawyer.
- John Crncich, 94, Canadian football player.
- Cécile Goldet, 105, French physician and politician, senator (1979–1984).
- Humayun Kabir, 67, Bangladeshi lawyer and politician, deputy minister, MP (1986–1990), heart attack.
- Guido Lauri, 96, Italian dancer and choreographer.
- Johanna Lindsey, 67, American novelist (Fires of Winter, Hearts Aflame), complications of treatment for lung cancer.
- David May, 70, English investigative journalist and editor, leukaemia.
- Ivan Milat, 74, Australian serial killer (backpacker murders), oesophageal and stomach cancer.
- Fred Overton, 80, American basketball coach.
- Anne Phelan, 71, Australian actress (Bellbird, Prisoner, Winners & Losers).
- Sir Malcolm Ross, 76, British royal courtier, Master of the Household of the Prince of Wales (2006–2008).
- Vladimir Rubin, 95, Russian composer, People's Artist (1995).
- Kamal Sharma, 49, Indian politician, heart attack.
- Mary Spiller, 95, British horticulturist and teacher.
- Hans-Peter Uhl, 75, German politician, MP (1998–2017).
- Xi Enting, 73, Chinese table tennis player, world champion (1973), thoracic aortic rupture.

=== 28 ===
- Safaa Al Sarai, 26, Iraqi human rights activist.
- Annick Alane, 94, French actress (Hibernatus, Pour la peau d'un flic, Three Men and a Cradle).
- Al Bianchi, 87, American basketball player (Syracuse Nationals/Philadelphia 76ers), coach (Seattle SuperSonics) and general manager (New York Knicks).
- Alfred L. Bright, 79, American artist and educator.
- Glen Cavaliero, 92, English poet and literary critic.
- Jean-Gabriel Diarra, 74, Malian Roman Catholic prelate, Bishop of San (since 1987).
- Ron Dunlap, 72, American basketball player (Maccabi Tel Aviv).
- Maria Flytzani-Stephanopoulos, 69, Greek-born American chemical engineer, cancer.
- Art Foley, 90, Irish hurler (Wexford).
- Kay Hagan, 66, American politician, U.S. Senator (2009–2015), complications from Powassan virus.
- Piyare Jain, 97, Indian particle physicist.
- Zoltán Jeney, 76, Hungarian composer.
- Dean L. Larsen, 92, American Mormon historian.
- Mao Kao-wen, 83, Taiwanese chemist, politician, and diplomat, Minister of Education (1987–1993).
- Ken McCracken, New Zealand rugby league player (Auckland, national team), prostate cancer.
- Bert Mozley, 96, English footballer (Derby County, national team).
- Toivo Salonen, 86, Finnish speed skater, Olympic bronze medalist (1956).
- Keith Schellenberg, 90, British Olympic bobsledder and luger (1956, 1964).
- John Walker, 82, American politician, member of the Arkansas House of Representatives (since 2011).

=== 29 ===
- Gerald Baliles, 79, American politician, Governor (1986–1990) and Attorney General of Virginia (1982–1985), member of the Virginia House of Delegates (1976–1982), renal cell carcinoma.
- David Bostock, 83, British philosopher.
- Cong Weixi, 86, Chinese author.
- Claude Constantino, 80, Senegalese Olympic basketball player (1968).
- Kaye Dening, 74, Australian tennis player.
- Kees Driehuis, 67, Dutch television presenter, cancer.
- Pat Griffin, 75, Irish Gaelic footballer (Kerry).
- Jean E. Irving, 93, Canadian philanthropist.
- Hiroshi Kashiwagi, 96, American poet, playwright and actor.
- Johnny Joyce, 82, Irish football player (Dublin GAA).
- Richard Lennon, 72, American Roman Catholic prelate, Bishop of Cleveland (2006–2016).
- Mustapha Matura, 79, Trinidadian playwright.
- Epineri Naituku, 56, Fijian rugby union player (national team).
- Ignazio Paleari, 65, Italian racing cyclist.
- Charlie Taaffe, 69, American football coach (Hamilton Tiger-Cats, Montreal Alouettes, Army Black Knights), cancer.
- John Witherspoon, 77, American actor (Friday, The Wayans Bros., The Boondocks), heart attack.

=== 30 ===
- Russell Brookes, 74, British rally driver, British Rally champion (1977, 1985).
- Georges Courtès, 94, French astronomer.
- Paul Crosby, 30, American basketball player (Mississippi Valley State, Minas), traffic collision.
- Barbara Sutton Curtis, 89, American jazz pianist.
- Meinrad Ernst, 94, Swiss Olympic wrestler.
- Ron Fairly, 81, American baseball player (Los Angeles Dodgers, Montreal Expos) and broadcaster (Seattle Mariners).
- Beatrice Faust, 80, Australian author and women's activist.
- Paul Geis, 66, American Olympic long-distance runner (1976).
- Frank Giles, 100, British journalist and historian, editor of The Sunday Times (1981–1983).
- Jim Gregory, 83, Canadian ice hockey coach (Toronto Marlboros) and executive (Toronto Maple Leafs).
- William J. Hughes, 87, American politician and diplomat, member of the U.S. House of Representatives (1975–1995), ambassador to Panama (1995–1998).
- Francis Xavier Irwin, 85, American Roman Catholic prelate, Auxiliary Bishop of Boston (1996–2009).
- Sam Jankovich, 84, American sports administrator.
- Mobolaji Johnson, 83, Nigerian military officer, Governor of Lagos State (1967–1975).
- James Platz, 88, Canadian Olympic sport shooter.
- Geoff Saunders, 91, English runner.
- Bernard Slade, 89, Canadian playwright (Same Time, Next Year) and television writer (The Flying Nun, The Partridge Family), complications from Lewy body dementia.
- Azam Taleghani, 76, Iranian politician and journalist, MP (1980–1984).
- J. Bob Traxler, 88, American politician, member of the U.S. House of Representatives (1974–1993) and Michigan House of Representatives (1962–1974).
- Ercílio Turco, 81, Brazilian Roman Catholic prelate, Bishop of Limeira (1989–2002) and Osasco (2002–2014), cancer.
- N. Venkatachala, 89, Indian judge, member of the Supreme Court (1992–1995).
- Paul Whelan, 75, Australian politician, NSW Minister for Police (1995–2001).

=== 31 ===
- Ebrahim Abadi, 85, Iranian actor (Mokhtarnameh, On Tiptoes, Grand Cinema).
- Anil Adhikari, 70, Indian politician, MLA (since 2011), cancer.
- Robert I. Berdon, 89, American justice, Associate Justice of the Connecticut Supreme Court (1991–1999).
- Denis Bernard, 86, Irish Gaelic footballer.
- Enrico Braggiotti, 96, Monegasque banker, President of the Banca Commerciale Italiana (1988–1990).
- Archie Brennan, 87, Scottish tapestry weaver.
- Tarania Clarke, 20, Jamaican footballer (Waterhouse, national team), stabbed.
- Ann Crumb, 69, American actress (Anna Karenina) and singer, ovarian cancer.
- Gurudas Dasgupta, 82, Indian politician, MP (1985–2000, 2004–2014), lung cancer.
- Noble Frankland, 97, British historian.
- Geetanjali, 72, Indian actress (Seetharama Kalyanam, Murali Krishna, Kalam Marindi), cardiac arrest.
- Florence Giorgetti, 75, French actress (La Grande Bouffe, The Lacemaker, Pepe Carvalho).
- Champak Jain, 52, Indian film producer (Khiladi, Main Khiladi Tu Anari, Josh).
- Tom MacIntyre, 87, Irish writer and poet.
- Raju Mavani, 62, Indian film producer, director, actor and screenplay writer, cancer.
- Roger Morin, 78, American Roman Catholic prelate, Bishop of Biloxi (2009–2016).
- Amjad Nasser, 64, Jordanian writer and poet.
- Jack O'Dell, 96, American civil rights activist.
- Silvio Padoin, 89, Italian Roman Catholic prelate, Bishop of Pozzuoli (1993–2005).
- Ren Xuefeng, 54, Chinese politician, Party Secretary of Guangzhou (2014–2018), Deputy Party Secretary of Chongqing (since 2018), fall.
- Giannis Spanos, 85, Greek composer.
- Vito Trause, 94, American soldier and prisoner of war.
- Antoon van der Steen, 83, Dutch racing cyclist.
