= Mel Aull =

Canadian football player (1928–2019)

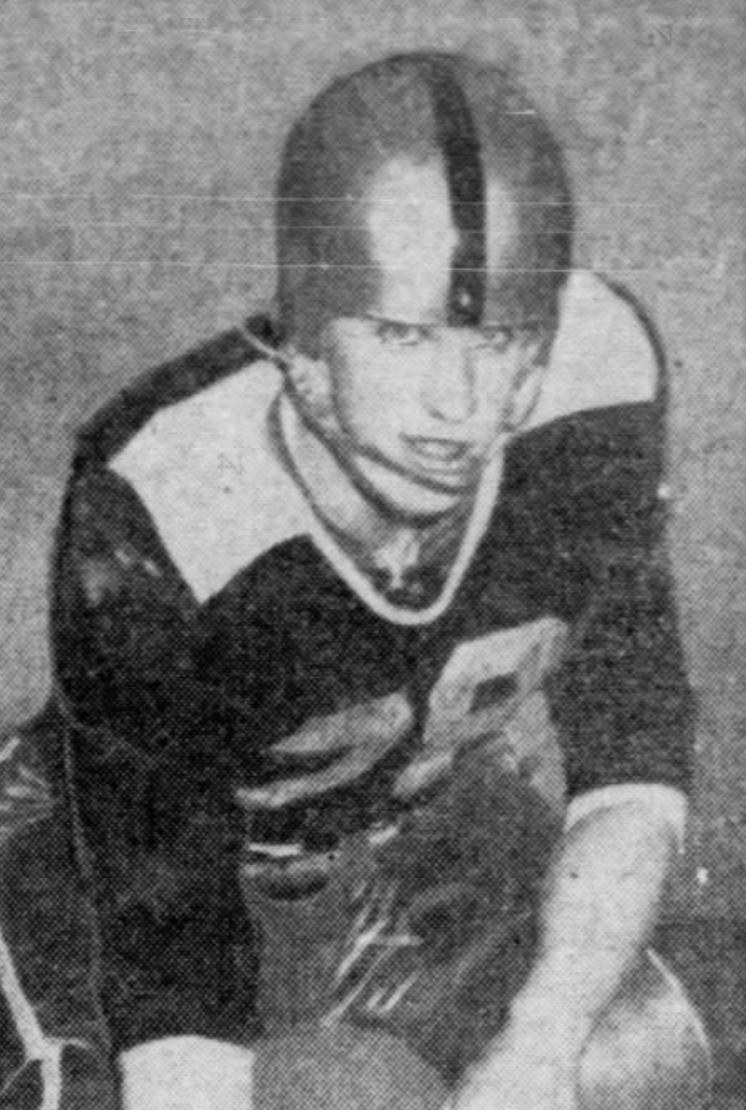
- Aull pictured c. 1947

Profile
- Positions: End, Tackle

Personal information
- Born: December 23, 1928; Hamilton, Ontario, Canada
- Died: October 12, 2019 (aged 90); Mississauga, Ontario, Canada
- Listed height: 5 ft 11 in (1.80 m)
- Listed weight: 210 lb (95 kg)

Career history
- 1950: Hamilton Tiger-Cats
- 1951–1952: Ottawa Rough Riders
- 1953–1954: Saskatchewan Roughriders

Awards and highlights
- Grey Cup champion (1951)

Melvin Andrew Aull (December 23, 1928 – October 12, 2019) was a Canadian professional football player who played for the Hamilton Tiger-Cats, Ottawa Rough Riders and Saskatchewan Roughriders. He won the Grey Cup with the Rough Riders in 1951.

Aull was born in Hamilton, Ontario and played junior football with the Junior Hamilton Tigers. He was notable for being the only deaf player in Canadian football during his playing years. He lost his hearing at the age of 13 in 1942 after he contracted spinal meningitis after going swimming at a local pool. He practiced lipreading in absence of his hearing and was able to talk normally. He died in Mississauga, Ontario on October 12, 2019.
