= Jiang Haokang =

Chinese aerospace engineer (1935–2019)

Jiang Haokang (Chinese: 蒋浩康; March 1935 – 15 October 2019) was a Chinese aerospace engineer and a professor at Beihang University. An expert on aeroengine testing and flow measurement technology, he won the State Science and Technology Progress Award (First Prize) in 1993.

== Biography ==
Jiang was born in March 1935 in Wujin, Jiangsu, Republic of China. In 1953, he became one of the first class of students at the newly established Beihang University (then called Beijing Institute of Aeronautics) and studied engine design. Upon graduation in 1958, he was hired by the university as a faculty member. From 1980 to 1983, he was a visiting scholar at Cranfield University in England.

With his research focus on aeroengine testing and flow measurement technology, Jiang was a recognized expert in the field in China. He was awarded the First Prize of the Guanghua Science and Technology Fund and a special pension by the Chinese government for distinguished scientists. In 1993, his research on "a large-scale axial flow compressor facility and dynamic measurement techniques for rotor flow study" won the State Science and Technology Progress Award (First Prize).

Jiang died on 15 October 2019 in Chengdu, aged 84.
