= Stuart Heydinger =

British photojournalist and portrait photographer (1927–2019)

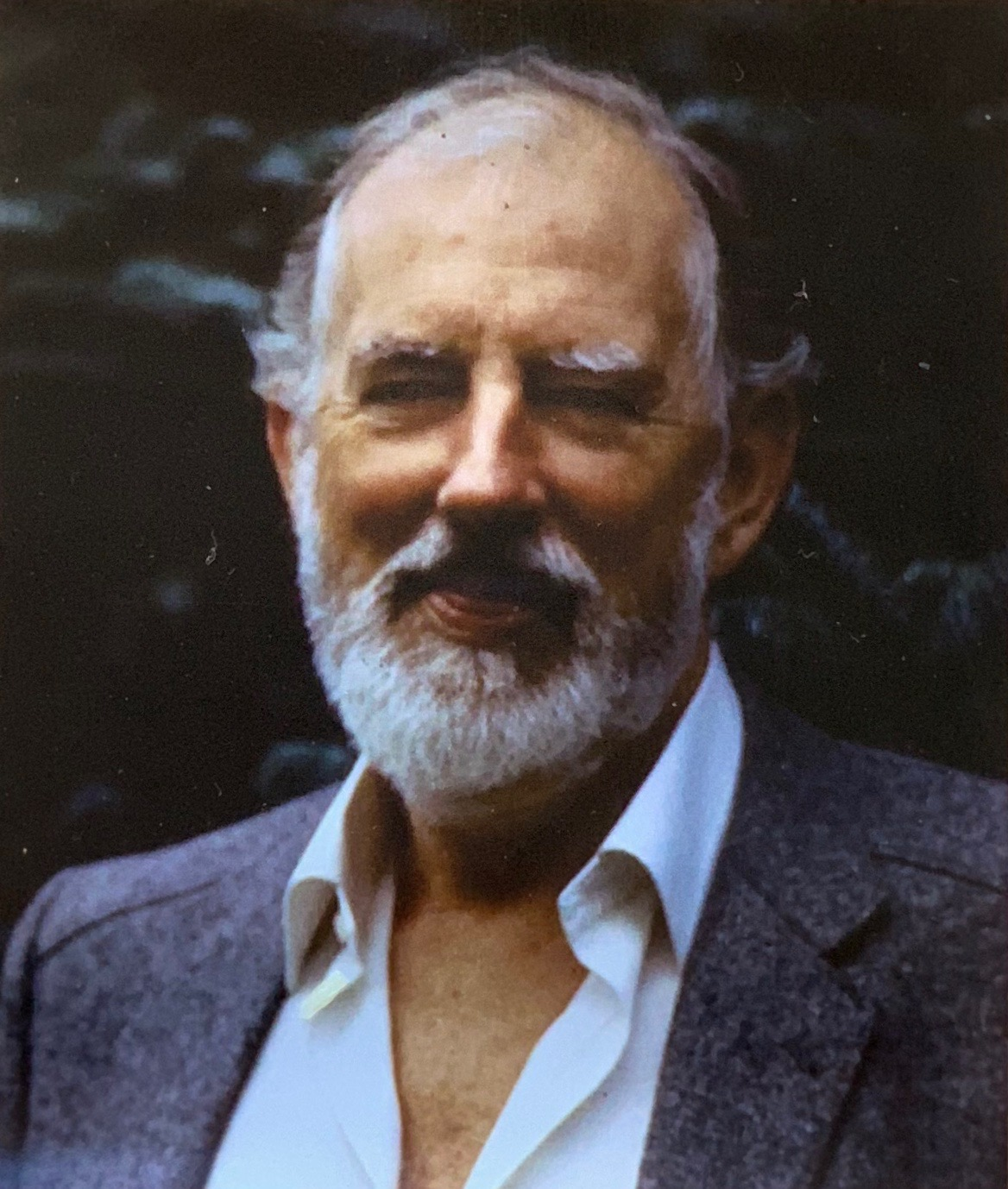
Heydinger

Stuart Heydinger (5 May 1927 – 6 October 2019) was a British photojournalist and portrait photographer. He was chief photographer at The Observer from 1960 to 1966.

== Life and work ==
Heydinger was born in Kingston upon Thames, south west London.

In 1960 he joined The Observer as chief photographer until he quit in 1966. He freelanced until 1968. In the early 1970s he travelled in the Basque country, drawing, painting and photographing people. In 1979 he moved to Germany where he worked taking photographs for theatres and made landscape photographs.

== Publications ==
- Just a Moment ... Fotografien von Stuart Heydinger. Bremen, Germany: Schuenemann, 2007. ISBN 978-3-7961-1904-0.

== Solo exhibitions ==
- Just a Moment: Photographs by Stuart Heydinger, Kingston Museum, Kingston upon Thames, 2008/2009

== Collections ==
- National Portrait Gallery, London: 1 print (as of November 2019)
