= Harold Scheub =

American Africanist (1931–2019)

Harold Scheub (August 26, 1931 – October 16, 2019) was an American Africanist, Evjue-Bascom Professor of Humanities Emeritus in the Department of African Languages and Literature (now the Department of African Cultural Studies) at the University of Wisconsin–Madison. Scheub has recorded and compiled oral literature from across southern Africa.

== Early life and education ==
Born in Gary, Indiana, Scheub was aware as a child of racial segregation in Gary. His family, of German descent, experienced harassment during the Second World War. After attending a Lutheran grade school and local high school, Scheub worked in a local steel mill. He joined the US Air Force, serving as a jet mechanic. On leaving the Air Force he was able to take advantage of the G.I. Bill to fund his college education, and studied literature at the University of Michigan. After a master's degree there, he taught composition classes at Valparaiso University.

== Teaching career ==
Scheub taught for two years at Masindi Senior Secondary School in Masindi, Uganda. On his return to the United States, he taught again at Valparaiso. Becoming involved in the civil rights movement, he studied Swahili at UCLA in the summer of 1965. Philip Curtin invited Scheub to study for a PhD in the department of African languages and literature at the University of Wisconsin. He worked with Archibald Campbell Jordan, who encouraged him to study Xhosa and do fieldwork research in South Africa. He gained his PhD in 1969 with a thesis on the Ntsomi, a performing art practiced by Xhosa women. Political scientist Crawford Young offered Scheub a permanent position at Wisconsin, and he taught there for 43 years until his retirement in December 2013.

Scheub did not marry and had no children. He died October 16, 2019, in Madison, Wisconsin, at age 88.

== Works ==
- Bibliography of African oral narratives, 1971
- African images, 1972
- The Xhosa Ntsomi, 1975
- African oral narratives, proverbs, riddles, poetry, and song, 1977
- Story, 1988
- The African storyteller: stories from African oral traditions, 1990
- (with Nongenile Masithathu Zenani) The world and the word: tales and observations from the Xhosa oral tradition, 1992
- The tongue is fire: South African storytellers and apartheid, 1996
- A dictionary of African mythology: the mythmaker as storyteller, 2000
- The poem in the story: music, poetry, and narrative, 2002
- African tales, 2005
- The uncoiling python: South African storytellers and resistance, 2010
- Trickster and hero: two characters in the oral and written traditions of the world, 2012
