= Salvador Giner =

Spanish sociologist (1934–2019)

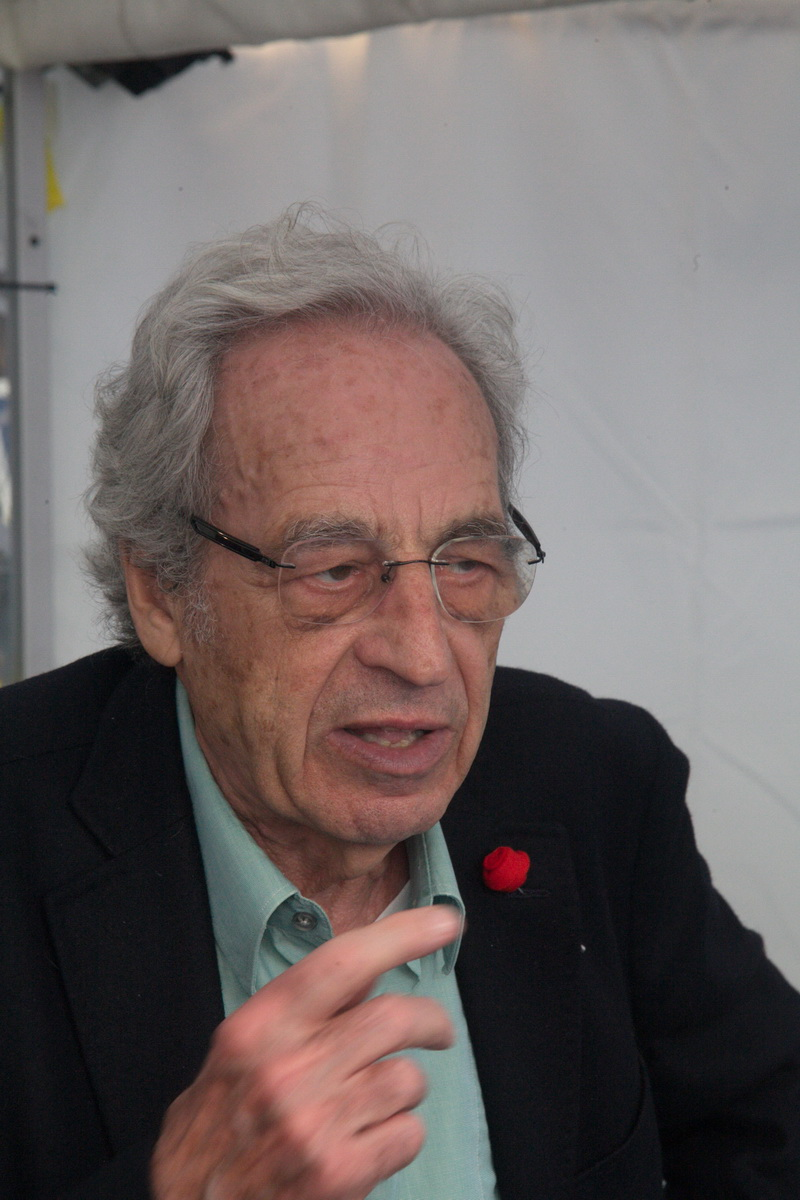
In 2015

Salvador Giner i de San Julián (10 February 1934 – 19 October 2019) was a Spanish sociologist, who was the president of the Institute of Catalan Studies between 2005 and 2013.

== Biography ==
Salvador Giner got his PhD in the University of Chicago and has postgraduate courses in the University of Cologne. In 1989, he became professor of sociology in the University of Barcelona (1989–2004).

His teaching activity has been developed in several countries. He was professor in the University of Cambridge (King's College), the University of Reading, the University of Lancaster and the University of West London (Brunel) between 1965 and 1989. He was visitant lecturer in the University of Rome, the National University of Mexico, the University of Puerto Rico, the University of Costa Rica, the University of Buenos Aires and the Autonomous University of Barcelona.

He is member of the Institute of Catalan Studies (1995), and he was founder and president of the Catalan Association of Sociology (1979), which depends on the IEC. He was also one of the founders of the European Association of Sociology. He has been director and teacher in the Universitat Catalana d'Estiu (Catalan university of summer) (1969–1975). He was director and founder of the Institute of Social Advanced Studies, which depends on the (CSIC).

He is editor and consultant of the Great Catalan Encyclopedia and of several national and international journals and reviews.

The Generalitat of Catalonia (Catalan regional government) gave him the Saint George cross in 1995.
