= Dick Soash =

American politician (1941–2019)

Member of the Colorado Senate
- In office 1976–1984

Personal details
- Born: Richard Morton Soash Sr. August 3, 1941 Steamboat Springs, Colorado, US
- Died: October 1, 2019 (aged 78) Florida, US
- Party: Colorado Democratic Party
- Education: Colorado State University
- Occupation: Rancher, farmer, politician

Richard Morton Soash Sr. (August 3, 1941 – October 1, 2019) was an American rancher, farmer and politician.

Soash was born on the Soash ranch near Steamboat Springs, Colorado. He graduated from Steamboat Springs High School and from Colorado State University. Soash was a rancher and farmer. He served as a Democrat in the Colorado Senate from 1976 to 1984. He died in Florida on October 1, 2019, aged 78.
