= Jakir Khan =

Bangladeshi film director (died 2019)

- Born: 1962/63
- Died: 19 October 2019 (aged 56)
- Occupation: film director

Jakir Khan (1962/63 – 19 October 2019) was a Bangladeshi film director. He directed eleven films before his death on 19 October 2019 at the age of 56.

== Selected filmography ==
- Char Okkhorer Valobasa
- Moner Ojante
- Mon Churi
- Rangamon
