= Victor J. Joos =

American politician

Member of the New Hampshire House of Representatives from the Strafford 1st district
- In office 1974–1984

Personal details
- Born: July 28, 1938
- Died: October 25, 2019 (aged 81)
- Party: Democratic

Victor J. Joos (July 28, 1938 – October 25, 2019) was an American politician. He served as a Democratic member for the Strafford 1st district of the New Hampshire House of Representatives.
