= Tomas Dy-Liacco =

Filipino-American electrical engineer (1920–2019)

Tomas Enciso Dy-Liacco (November 12, 1920 – October 24, 2019) was a Filipino-American electrical engineer, researcher, and developer often referred to as the father of modern energy control centers.

Dy-Liacco is one of the early pioneers of the basic concepts of security control. He developed several industry-first applications of advanced real-time functions in control centers. He also served as an international consultant on SCADA/EMS (Supervisory Control and Data Acquisition/Energy Management System), Distribution Management Systems (DMS) and hydro power plant automation, assisting in the planning, implementation and testing of nearly 40 control center projects in more than 20 countries.

== Education ==
Dy-Liacco received a bachelor's degree in electrical engineering (cum laude) from the University of the Philippines Diliman in 1940. In 1941 he received a second degree from UP Diliman, this time in Mechanical Engineering.

He then went to the Illinois Institute of Technology in Chicago, and received a master's degree in electrical engineering in 1955. In 1968 he received his PhD in systems engineering from Case Western Reserve University in Cleveland, Ohio.

== Life and career ==
Dy-Liacco was born in Naga City, Camarines Sur, Philippines, in November 1920.

From 1947–1949, he served as Head of the Design Section of the Distribution Engineering at the Taiwan Power Company in Taipei, Taiwan. After that, he returned to the Philippines and took the post of Chief Electrical Engineer at Bicol Electric Company and at the same time, served as lecturer in Mathematics at the University of Nueva Caceres, both in Naga City, from 1949–1953.

He joined Cleveland Electric Illuminating Company, Cleveland in 1955 and was assigned in the System Planning Department, where he served as principal systems engineer. He was in charge of research and analysis of power systems in the scope of planning, protection and computer control. At the same time he was adjunct professor of electrical engineering at Case Western Reserve University.

One of his most important later works was his paper, "The Adaptive Reliability Control System" which won an IEEE Power Group Prize Paper Award in 1968, earned him an IEEE Life Fellow and the name "father of modern energy control centers".

He later became an independent consultant with the Dy Liacco Corporation, Cleveland, Ohio. Dy-Liacco died in October 2019 at the age of 98.

== Affiliations ==
He was awarded Life Fellow of IEEE in 1975 "for his contributions in advance control concepts for secure and reliable operation of electrical power systems."

He was the founder and organizer of the International Workshop on Electric Power Control Centers held biennially in Europe, a member of PES, and an active member of committees and working groups of IEEE, IFAC, and CIGRE.

His other affiliations included: Sigma Pi Sigma, Tau Beta Pi, Eta Kappa Nu, Sigma Xi, the Instrument Society of American, the Tensor Society of Great Britain, and the EEI Engineering and Technical Systems Computer Committee.
