= John Wilson Nattubu Tsekooko =

Ugandan lawyer and judge (1943–2019)

Honorable John Wilson Nattubu Tsekooko
- Born: 30 January 1943; Mbale, Uganda
- Died: 14 October 2019 (aged 76); Kampala, Uganda
- Education: Makerere University (LL.B.); Law Development Centre (Diploma in Legal Practice)
- Occupations: Lawyer, judge
- Years active: 1968–2017
- Title: Retired Justice of the Supreme Court of Uganda

John Wilson Nattubu Tsekooko (30 January 1943 – 14 October 2019), was a Ugandan lawyer and judge, who served as a Justice of the Supreme Court of Uganda, from 1994 until 2015.

== Background and education ==
He was born in the Bugisu sub-region of the Eastern Region, Uganda, in 1943. He graduated from Makerere University, Uganda's oldest and largest public university, with a Bachelor of Laws degree. He also obtained a Diploma in Legal Practice from the Law Development Centre, in Kampala.

== Career ==
Tsekooko served as a state attorney in the Directorate of Public Prosecution from 1968 until 1974. He then resigned and went into private law practice until 1977. He went into exile between 1977 and 1979.

In 1990, he was appointed to serve as a Judge on the High Court of Uganda. In 1994, a vacancy opened up on the Uganda Supreme Court. His name was nominated to the appointing authority by the Judicial Services Commission. President Yoweri Museveni appointed him to the Supreme Court of Uganda. He served in that capacity until 2013 when he turned 70 years of age. He was hired on contract for another four years, until his retirement in 2017.

== As a private attorney ==
In 1980, Tsekooko served as a defence attorney for Milton Obote, in a defamation case against him filed by then presidential candidate Yoweri Museveni.

== As a Justice of the Supreme Court ==
On two occasions, in 2001 and 2006, Supreme Court Justice John Wilson Tsekooko ruled in favour of presidential candidate Kiiza Besigye in contested national presidential elections in each of those years. In both instances, Justice Tsekooko was a member of the dissenting minority on the bench.

== Death ==
Two weeks before his death, he was admitted to Norvik Hospital, a private healthcare facility in Kampala, Uganda's capital city. He died there on the afternoon of 14 October 2019. He was buried at his ancestral home in Bunakhaima Village, Butiru Sub-county, Manafwa District, on Saturday, 19 October 2019, at 4pm local time.
