= Kang Laiyi =

Chinese epidemiologist (1936–2019)

Kang Laiyi (Chinese: 康来仪; 17 September 1936 – 5 October 2019) was a Chinese epidemiologist. He was a professor, chief medical doctor and director at the Shanghai Center for Disease Control and Prevention. He worked in public health for almost six decades, including more than 30 years in HIV/AIDS epidemiology and management.

== Biography ==
Kang was born on 17 September 1936 in Fenghua, Zhejiang, Republic of China. After graduating from Shanghai Medical College in 1957, he taught at Shanghai Medical Specialty School for five years.

In August 1962, Kang transferred to the Shanghai Center for Disease Control and Prevention and worked there for the rest of his career. From 1984 to 1986, he received further training in epidemiology of infectious diseases at the University of Toronto in Canada.

After returning to China in December 1986, he worked in the prevention and treatment of the new disease AIDS. He was appointed Director of the Shanghai AIDS Monitoring Center in October 1991 and Deputy Director of the Shanghai AIDS Research Center in 2001. Kang later served as Chief Medical Doctor and Director at the Shanghai Center for Disease Control and Prevention, and also taught as an adjunct professor at the University of Toronto.

Kang died on 5 October 2019, aged 83.

== Contributions ==
In the 1960s, Kang worked for years on cholera prevention and treatment in the outskirts of Shanghai. He also went to Kashgar, Xinjiang to advise on the management of a cholera outbreak there.

In 1970, Kang quickly detected and controlled an anthrax outbreak which killed a large number of mink in the Shanghai Zoo. When a major outbreak of dermatitis affected half a million people in Shanghai in 1972, Kang determined the cause to be caterpillars of the moth Euproctis similis xanthocampa and devised measures to control the disease.

From 1978, Kang oversaw the creation of the hepatitis B vaccination program for newborns in Shanghai, the first such program in China. In 1988, when 290,000 people in Shanghai were infected with hepatitis A, Kang conducted research that determined the cause of the outbreak to be consumption of contaminated Anadara subcrenata clams.

Starting in the late 1980s, Kang mainly focused on the epidemiology, intervention research, clinical evaluation, and management of HIV/AIDS. In 1989, he established one of China's first labs to isolate and detect the virus. In 1992, he organized a major epidemiological study of hepatitis C and hepatitis E involving nearly 90,000 patients in four provinces. In 1998, he detected the first case of HIV/AIDS in a haemophiliac. During the 2003 SARS outbreak, Kang was a key member of the Shanghai SARS prevention group.

Kang published more than 20 books and nearly 200 research papers. He received many national and municipal awards including the Distinguished Contribution Award of the National Science Congress, State Science and Technology Progress Award (Third Class), and the Shanghai Science and Technology Progress Award (First Class).
