= Guo Dehong =

Chinese historian (1942–2019)

Guo Dehong (Chinese: 郭德宏; March 1942 – 22 October 2019) was a Chinese historian. A specialist in modern Chinese history and the history of the Chinese Communist Party, he served as President of the China Modern History Society.

== Biography ==
Guo was born in March 1942 in Changyi, Shandong, Republic of China. He graduated from the Department of History of Shandong University in 1967.

Guo was a specialist in the history of the Chinese Communist Party, modern Chinese history, and Mao Zedong thought. He published more than 300 research papers, more than 10 monographs, and edited over 60 other books. He won more than 20 national awards including multiple National Book Prizes. He was a professor and doctoral advisor at the Central Party School of the Chinese Communist Party, and served as President of the China Modern History Society.

Guo died on 22 October 2019 in Beijing, aged 77.

== Selected works ==
- Research on the Problem of Peasantry and Land in Modern China 中国近现代农民土地问题研究
- Chronicle of Wang Ming 王明年谱
- History of the Chinese National Anti-Japanese War 中华民族抗日战争史 (co-editor)
- History of the Red Army's Long March 红军长征史 (co-editor)
- History of the Development of Marxism in China 中国马克思主义发展史 (editor-in-chief)
- The Journey of the Chinese Communist Party 中国共产党的历程 (editor-in-chief)
- The Seventy Years of the Chinese Communist Party 中国共产党的七十年 (co-author)
- Basic Issues of Mao Zedong Thought 毛泽东思想基本问题 (co-editor)
