= Emmett Chappelle =

American scientist (1925-2019)

Emmett W. Chappelle
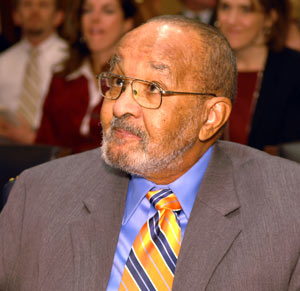
- Chappelle at the National Inventors Hall of Fame induction ceremony in 2007
- Born: October 24, 1925; Phoenix, Arizona
- Died: October 14, 2019 (aged 93); Baltimore, Maryland
- Education: Phoenix College, University of California, Berkeley (B.S.), University of Washington (M.S.)
- Known for: Bioluminescence
- Scientific career
- Fields: Biochemistry, food science, astrochemistry
- Workplaces: Meharry Medical College (Nashville, Tennessee), Stanford University, Martin Marietta Corporation, National Aeronautics and Space Administration (NASA)

Emmett W. Chappelle (October 24, 1925 – October 14, 2019) was an American scientist who made valuable contributions in the fields of medicine, philanthropy, food science, and astrochemistry. His achievements led to his induction into the National Inventors Hall of Fame for his work on bioluminescence, in 2007. Being honored as one of the 100 most distinguished African American scientists of the 20th Century, he was also one of the members of the American Chemical Society, the American Society of Biochemistry and Molecular Biology, the American Society of Photobiology, the American Society of Microbiology, and the American Society of Black Chemists.

== Early life ==
In 1925, Emmett Chappelle was born in Phoenix, Arizona to his parents, Viola White Chappelle and Isom Chappelle, who grew cotton and raised cattle on their farm. Born into segregation, Chappelle was required to attend the segregated Phoenix Union Colored High School in Phoenix, where he was the top graduate of his senior class of 25 students. Upon graduation, in 1942, Emmett enlisted in the army where he was able to take some engineering courses before being assigned to the 92nd Infantry Division that was stationed in Italy. During his time in the service, he suffered two non-fatal wounds in action. After his return from Italy in 1946, he attended Phoenix College where he studied electrical engineering and received an A.A. degree before he redirected his focus and career towards the sciences.

== Career and important discoveries ==
In 1950, Chappelle received a Bachelor of Science degree in biology from the University of California, Berkeley, then served as an instructor of biochemistry at Meharry Medical College in Nashville, Tennessee, from 1950 to 1953, without graduate training. He then left Tennessee to continue his education at the University of Washington where he received his master's degree, also in Biology. From 1955 to 1958, he worked as a research associate at Stanford University where he was also appointed as a scientist and biochemist for the Research Institute of Advanced Studies until 1963.

In 1958, Chappelle joined the Research Institute in Baltimore, a division of the Martin Marietta Corporation that designed airplanes and spacecraft. There, Chappelle made a discovery that contributed to the understanding of bacteria, cyanobacteria, and other single-celled organisms globally. He discovered that even single-celled organisms such as algae, are photosynthetic, meaning they are able to convert carbon dioxide to sugar and water into oxygen. The ability to photosynthesize is characteristic of all plants, which is the opposite process of cellular respiration, which all organisms use to create the energy needed for life.

In 1963, Chappelle went to work at Hazelton Laboratories (now Fortrea) as a biochemist but later joined the National Aeronautics and Space Administration (NASA) as an exobiologist and astrochemist, in 1966. As an exobiologist and astrochemist of NASA, someone who focuses towards the search for extraterrestrial life and studies the chemistry of astronomical objects, he worked on the Viking Spacecraft and helped develop instruments to collect and scrape soil from the surface of Mars. However, he was most well known for his work on bioluminescence. In 1977 he was moved to the Goddard Space Flight Center in Greenbelt, Maryland, as a remote sensing scientist, studying natural systems to improve environmental management.

While designing instruments for the Mars Viking spacecraft, Chappelle became interested in bioluminescence, which is warm light produced by living organisms. He developed a method using two chemicals, luciferase and luciferin, from fireflies which give off light when mixed with ATP (adenosine triphosphate), an energy storage compound found in all living cells, to detect the presence of ATP. This method for ATP detection can be used to detect life on other planets as well as microbiological organisms. Chappelle also proved that the number of bacteria in water can be measured by the amount of light given off by that bacteria. This discovery allowed scientists and doctors to detect small amounts of bacteria in places such as urine, in order to detect an onset of a bacterial infection. Additionally, he developed a method for determining vegetation health by using laser-induced fluorescence to measure the amount of photosynthesis occurring in crops, allowing scientists to detect plant stress, determine growth rates, water conditions, and harvest timing.

Chappelle retired from NASA in 2001, at the age of 76. He died in Baltimore, Maryland on October 14, 2019, at the age of 93.

== Patents ==
1. July 27, 1976: Method of detecting and counting bacteria
  - An improved method is provided for determining bacterial levels, especially in samples of aqueous physiological fluids, which method depends on the quantitative determination of bacterial adenosine triphosphate (ATP) in the presence of non-bacterial ATP. The bacterial ATP is released by cell rupture and is measured by an enzymatic bioluminescent assay. A concentration technique is included to make the method more sensitive. It is particularly useful where the fluid to be measured contains an unknown or low bacteria count.
2. March 29, 1977: Application of luciferase assay for ATP to antimicrobial drug susceptibility
  - The susceptibility of bacteria, particularly those derived from body fluids, to antimicrobial agents is determined in terms of an ATP index measured by culturing a bacterium in a growth medium, assaying the amount of ATP in a sample of the cultured bacterium by measuring the amount of luminescent light emitted when the bacterial ATP is reacted with a luciferase-luciferin mixture, subjecting the sample of the cultured bacterium to an antibiotic agent and assaying the amount of bacterial adenosine triphosphate after treatment with the antibiotic by measuring the luminescent light resulting from the reaction, whereby the ATP index is determined from the values obtained from the assay procedures.
3. January 2, 1979: Determination of antimicrobial susceptibilities on infected urines without isolation
  - Method for the quick determination of the susceptibilities of various unidentified bacteria contained in an aqueous physiological fluid sample, particularly urine, to one or more antibiotics. A bacterial adenosine triphosphate (ATP) assay is carried out after the elimination of non-bacterial ATP to determine whether an infection exists. If an infection does exist, a portion of the sample is further processed, including subjecting parts of the portion to one or more antibiotics. Growth of the bacteria in the parts are determined, again by an ATP assay, to determine whether the unidentified bacteria in the sample are susceptible to the antibiotic or antibiotics under test.
4. May 24, 1983: Rapid, quantitative determination of bacteria in water
  - A bioluminescent assay for ATP in water borne bacteria is made by adding nitric acid to a water sample with concentrated bacteria to rupture the bacterial cells. The sample is diluted with sterile, deionized water, then mixed with a luciferase-luciferin mixture and the resulting light output of the bioluminescent reaction is measured and correlated with bacteria present. A standard and a blank also are processed so that the light output can be correlated to bacteria in the sample and system "noise" can be subtracted from the readings. A chemiluminescent assay for iron porphyrins in water borne bacteria is made by adding luminol reagent to a water sample with concentrated bacteria and measuring the resulting light output of the chemiluminescent reaction. The light output is correlated with bacteria present. A standard and a blank are also processed so that the light output can be correlated to bacteria in the sample and system "noise" can be subtracted from the readings(reword)
5. May 2, 1995: Method for determining surface coverage by materials exhibiting different fluorescent properties
  - An improved method for detecting, measuring, and distinguishing crop residue, live vegetation, and mineral soil. By measuring fluorescence in multiple bands, live and dead vegetation are distinguished. The surface of the ground is illuminated with ultraviolet radiation, inducing fluorescence in certain molecules. The emitted fluorescent emission induced by the ultraviolet radiation is measured by means of a fluorescence detector, consisting of a photodetector or video camera and filters. The spectral content of the emitted fluorescent emission is characterized at each point sampled, and the proportion of the sampled area covered by residue or vegetation is calculated.
