= Zhang Siying =

Chinese automatic control specialist (1925–2019)

- 张嗣瀛
- Born: 5 April 1925; Zhangqiu County, Shandong, Republic of China
- Died: 4 October 2019 (aged 94); Qingdao, Shandong, China
- Education: Wuhan University; Moscow State University
- Scientific career
- Fields: Automatic control
- Workplaces: Qingdao University

Chinese name
- Traditional Chinese: 張嗣瀛
- Simplified Chinese: 张嗣瀛
Transcriptions
Standard Mandarin
- Hanyu Pinyin: Zhāng Sìyíng

Zhang Siying (Chinese: 张嗣瀛; 5 April 1925 – 4 October 2019) was a Chinese automatic control specialist, a professor and doctoral supervisor of Qingdao University, and an academician of the Chinese Academy of Sciences (CAS).

== Biography ==
Zhang was born in Zhangqiu County, Shandong, on 5 April 1925. He elementary studied at Provincial No.1 Middle School in Ji'nan and secondary studied at Beijing Chongshi High School. In 1944, he was accepted to Wuhan University, where he graduated in August 1948.

After the establishment of the People's Republic of China in October 1949, he taught at Northeastern University of Technology (now Northeastern University), where he successively served as professor, director of Engineering Mechanics Department, and head of Institute of Automation. Zhang joined the Chinese Communist Party in 1950. In September 1957, he pursued advanced studies in the Soviet Union, where he studied automatic control at Moscow State University. Zhang was elected an academician of the Chinese Academy of Sciences (CAS) in 1997. In 1999 he founded the Institute of Complexity Science at Qingdao University and served as its head. In 2005 he established Complex Systems and Complexity Science with academician Dai Ruwei. In 2013, he won the Highest Prize of Science and Technology in Qingdao and donated all the prizes to set up a "Zhang Siying Outstanding Youth Paper Award" for postgraduates. Zhang died of illness in Qingdao, Shandong, aged 94.
