= Ezequiel Esperón =

Argentine footballer (1996–2019)

Personal information
- Full name: Ezequiel Gonzalo Esperón
- Date of birth: 4 April 1996
- Place of birth: Buenos Aires, Argentina
- Date of death: 6 October 2019 (aged 23)
- Height: 1.80 m (5 ft 11 in)
- Position: Midfielder

Youth career
- –2015: All Boys
- 2015: Internacional
- 2016: Grêmio

Senior career*
Years	Team	Apps	(Gls)
2017–2019	Grêmio	1	(0)
2018–2019	→ Atlante (loan)	35	(1)
- * Club domestic league appearances and goals

Ezequiel Gonzalo Esperón (4 April 1996 – 6 October 2019) was an Argentine footballer who played as a midfielder. He was born in Buenos Aires. His last club was Atlante on loan from Grêmio.
