= Ray Jenkins (journalist) =

American journalist (1930–2019)

- Born: Carrell Ray Jenkins; September 25, 1930; Sylvester, Georgia, US
- Died: 24 October 2019 (aged 89); Baltimore, Maryland, US
- Education: University of Georgia (B.A in journalism)
- Occupations: Journalist; news editor; columnist
- Years active: 1951–1991
- Spouse: Bettina Cirsoviusi (m. 1956)
- Children: 3
- Awards: 1955 Pulitzer Prize

Carrell Ray Jenkins (September 25, 1930 – October 24, 2019) was an American journalist, columnist, and newspaper editor. He was a member of the Columbus Ledger's reporting team that won the 1955 Pulitzer Prize for public service. He also served as a press assistant to President Jimmy Carter during 1979-80.

== Early life and education ==
Jenkins was born on September 25, 1930, in Sylvester, Georgia, US to a family whose primary mode of livelihood was agriculture-related. He received his school education from Camilla High School. He attended the University of Georgia to earn a bachelor's degree in journalism in 1951. He also received a law degree from the Faulkner University in Montgomery in 1977.

== Career ==
Jenkins started his career in 1951 by joining the Columbus Ledger newspaper. After covering the Phenix City Story and winning the Pulitzer Prize at the age of 24, he was promoted to the newspaper’s city editor. Later, he became the editorial page editor at the Alabama Journal in Montgomery and then at the Montgomery Advertiser.

As a journalist, Jenkins covered the civil rights movement, accompanying Martin Luther King Jr. on his way to the March on Washington in 1963 and the Selma to Montgomery march in 1965. A report by him in The New York Times in 1960 about some factual errors in a week-old advertisement, appealing for funding to defend King in a Montgomery perjury case, sparked the New York Times Co. v. Sullivan decision by the U.S. Supreme Court. That decision limited the capacity of public officials to sue for defamation.

In 1978, Jenkins was appointed vice president and editor of the Montgomery Advertiser and Alabama Journal. In 1979, he resigned from that job to be a special assistant to President Jimmy Carter for press affairs. In 1981, Jenkins became a columnist and editor at The Baltimore Evening Sun.

== Personal life ==
Jenkins married Bettina Cirsovius, an immigrant from Germany, in 1956. Both had two sons and a daughter together.

== Retirement and death ==
After a career spanning over four decades, he finally retired from journalism in 1991. He died at the age of 89 on October 24, 2019, in Baltimore. He had been suffering from congestive heart failure.

== Books ==
- Blind Vengeance: The Roy Moody Mail Bomb Murders, published by the University of Georgia Press in 1995

== Awards and honors ==
- 1955 Pulitzer Prize as a member of the Columbus Ledger's reporting team
- 1965 Nieman Fellowship at Harvard University
