= Saadi Younis =

Iraqi footballer (1953–2019)

Personal information
- Full name: Saadi Younis Said
- Date of birth: 1 July 1953
- Place of birth: Iraq
- Date of death: 8 October 2019 (aged 66)

Senior career*
Years	Team	Apps	(Gls)
- Al-Moshah
- Al-Naft SC
- Al-Sinaa SC
- Al-Quwa Al-Jawiya

International career
1973–1975	Iraq		
- * Club domestic league appearances and goals

Saadi Younis (1 July 1953 – 8 October 2019) was an Iraqi footballer who played for Iraq in the 1974 Asian Games. He was a member of the Iraq national football team between 1973 and 1975.
