= Cécile Goldet =

French physician and politician (1914–2019)

Cécile Goldet (15 March 1914 – 27 October 2019) was a French physician and politician, who served as a member of the Senate, representing Paris from 1979 to 1984, succeeding Georges Dayan, who died in office.

== Biography ==
His father, Lucien François Marc, a doctor of geography, joined the army as an officer and served in the colonial forces in Madagascar and West Africa. A captain, he was killed in the early days of World War I, on September 15, 1914. His mother, Louise Marie Schrader, was a doctor.

Cécile Marc-Schrader studied medicine in Paris and obtained her medical degree in 1940. She is a pediatrician and gynecologist.

In 1941, Cécile Marc-Schrader joined the French Foundation for the Study of Human Problems, an organization supported by the Vichy government whose purpose was to study “all aspects of measures to safeguard, improve, and develop the French population.” It was founded by surgeon and biologist Alexis Carrel (1873-1944), who was its regent. A proponent of racist and eugenicist theories and a member of Jacques Doriot French Popular Party (PPF) in 1937, Alexis Carrel was suspended from his duties in August 1944 by the provisional government. He denied any collaboration with Germany and was not tried.

According to historian Alain Drouard, “nothing could be more wrong than to consider all members of the Foundation as collaborators or fascists in the pay of the occupying forces, even if this may have been the case for some of them.” He points out that “Doctors Jean Sutter, Pierre Royer, and Cécile Goldet, then known as Marc-Schrader, [were] involved in the Resistance.”

Cécile Marc-Schrader's activities during World War II have been confused with those of her sister-in-law, Cécile Goldet (1901-1987), a nurse in the Vercors resistance movement who was deported to Ravensbrück concentration camp.

In May 1945, Cécile Marc-Schrader married Antoine Gustave Goldet, an engineer in Paris, and took the name Cécile Goldet.

In 1960, she helped found the French Movement for Family Planning. In 1962, she joined the Mouvement Démocratique Féminin (Women's Democratic Movement), introduced by Marie-Thérèse Eyquem, then in 1964 the Convention des institutions républicaines (CIR), a group founded by François Mitterrand. She was first elected as a municipal councilor in Fleury-en-Bière in 1965. She also ran in the 1967 and 1971 Paris municipal elections as a Socialist Party candidate, but was defeated. In 1970, she became treasurer of the Association for the Study of Abortion.

She joined CERES, Jean-Pierre Chevènement political movement. From 1975 to 1977, she sat on the PS steering committee. In 1977, she was refused nomination as a candidate for the Senate elections. After the 1978 legislative elections, she became part of the “autonomous women” movement. Along with Françoise Gaspard and Édith Lhuillier, she declared her break with the party.

Cécile Goldet became a senator in 1979, replacing Georges Dayan. In the Senate, she sits on the Social Affairs Committee, is vice-president of the Socialist Group, and secretary of the Senate.

She retired as a gynecologist in 1982.

In 1990, she signed the Appeal of the 75 against the Gulf War.
