= Ole Henrik Laub =

Danish novelist (1937–2019)

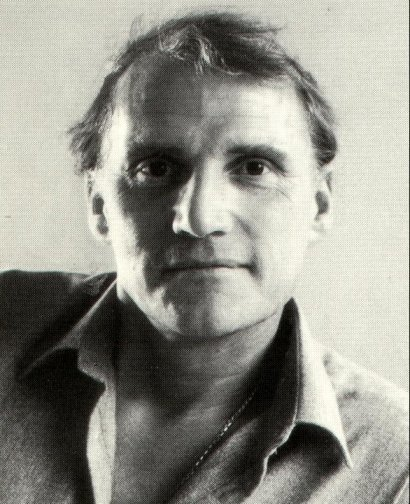
Ole Henrik Laub

Ole Henrik Laub (3 December 1937 in Aarhus – 22 October 2019) was a Danish novelist and author of short-stories and children books. He was also an art painter and cartoonist.

Laub made his debut in 1967 with Et Sværd Dyppet i Honning, a collection of short stories. He wrote more than fifty books, short stories, novels, and books for children. He also wrote for the stage, for radiodrama and plays for TV. Many of his stories are about people in Danish provincial towns.

== Novels ==
- Fondamenta Nuove 1996
- Hovedrollen 1997
- Alle Himlens Farver 2002
- Fugle flyver hjem 2005
- Fjolsernes Konge (King of Fools) 2007
