= John M. Downs =

American sketch artist (1936–2019)

John Micael Downs (December 17, 1936 – October 21, 2019) was an American sketch artist, who worked for the Chicago Daily News and Chicago Sun-Times.

== Early life and education ==
He was born in Tomah, Wisconsin.

He studied at the School of the Art Institute.

== Career ==
He worked as an illustrator while serving in the United States Army. He later contributed nearly 150 illustrations in an Air Force arts program.

As a sketch artist, he worked for the Chicago Daily News and Chicago Sun-Times and covered many famous trials including that of the Chicago Seven trial.
