= Vicki Gregory =

British microbiologist (1968–2019)

- Born: 1968; Birmingham, England
- Died: 2019 (aged 50–51)
- Education: University College London

Vicki Gregory (1968–2019) was a British microbiologist and international expert on influenza. Gregory served as stalwart of the Worldwide Influenza Centre at the Francis Crick Institute in London. She was a founding member of GISAID's Database Technical Group, and was involved in signing off the annual composition of the influenza virus vaccine for the northern hemisphere.

== Early life and education ==
Gregory was born in 1968 in Birmingham, England. Her parents were businessperson Steve Gregory and librarian Sue Gregory (née Higgins). Gregory's family later moved to Hemel Hempstead, Hertfordshire. There, she completed her secondary education at the math and computing academy Longdean School. Gregory attended the University College London and received a degree in microbiology. From there, she went to research global influenza viruses at the Francis Crick Institute, in a group led initially by Alan Hay.

== Career and research ==
Gregory was stalwart of the Worldwide Influenza Centre at the Francis Crick Institute. Gregory collaborated with many World Health Organization laboratories such as those of the Global Influenza Surveillance and Response System (GISRS). Gregory was a founding member of GISAID's Database Technical Group, which provides "scientific guidance for the development of GISAID’s EpiFlu database".

She also "co-authored a number of advisory commentaries on influenza virus risks and was a key person in signing off the annually revised composition of the influenza virus vaccine for the northern hemisphere."

== Personal life and death ==
In 2008, Gregory married Kieron O’Neill, the lead singer band the S-Haters, and they had a daughter.

Gregory retired due to ill health in 2018, and died of cancer, aged 51, in 2019.
