= V. Nanammal =

Indian yoga teacher (1920–2019)

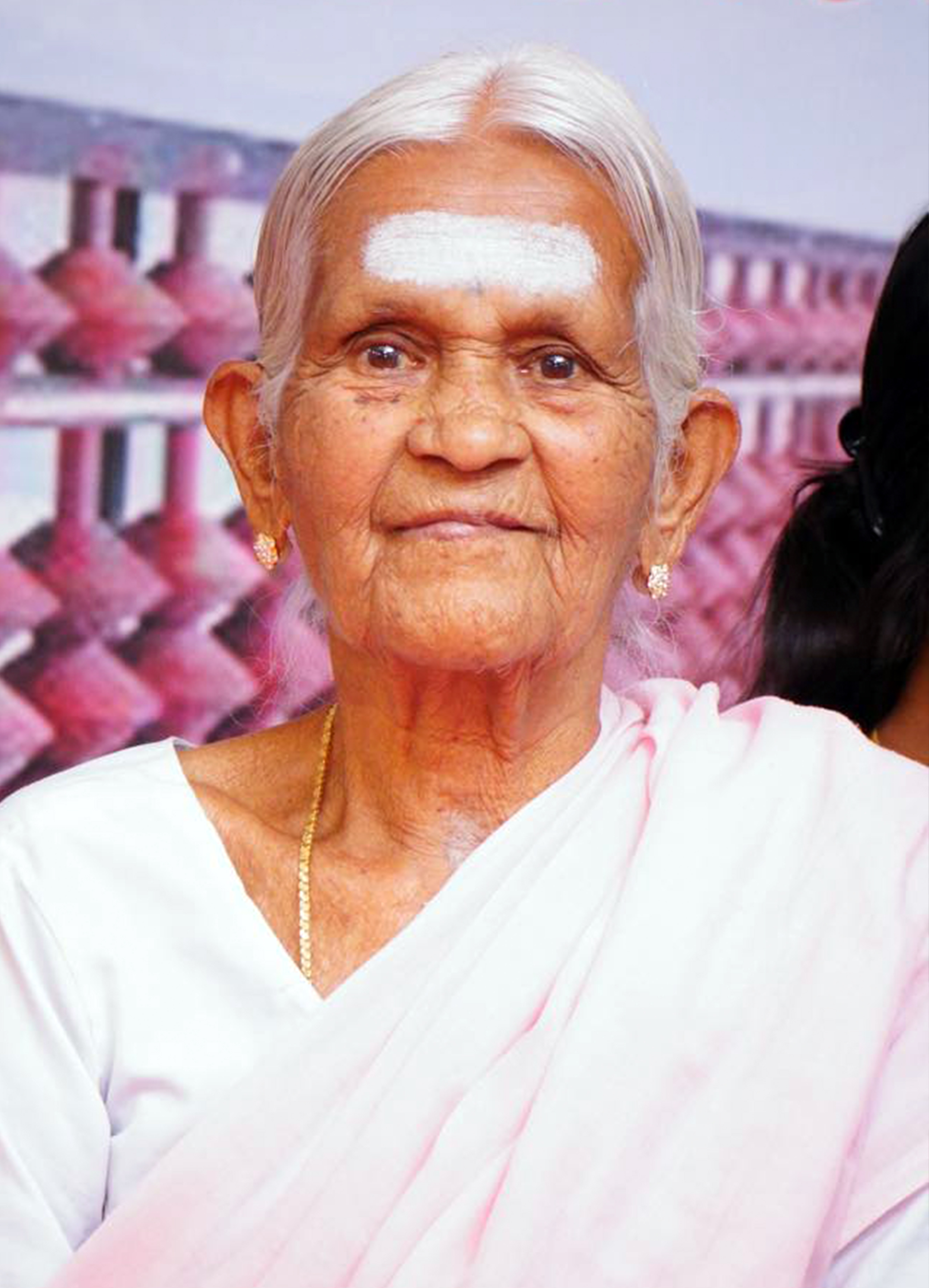
- Nanammal in 2018
- Born: 24 February 1920; Coimbatore, Madras Presidency, India
- Died: 26 October 2019 (aged 99); Coimbatore, Tamil Nadu, India
- Occupation: Yoga instructor
- Awards: Nari Shakti Puraskar (2016); Yoga Ratna award (2017); Padma Shri award (2018)

V. Nanammal (24 February 1920 – 26 October 2019) was India's oldest yoga teacher. She trained one million students over 45 years and taught one hundred students daily. Six hundred of her students have become yoga instructors around the world.

Her work was honoured with India's National Nari Shakti Puraskar in 2016 and the country's fourth highest civilian award the Padma Shri in 2018.

== Personal life ==
Nanammal was born on 24 February 1920 in an agricultural family at Zameen Kaliayapuram, Coimbatore, Tamil Nadu, India. At the age of eight, she learnt yoga from her father, eventually mastering more than 50 asanas.

Nanammal's father and grandfather were both 'Registered Indian Medicine Practitioners (RIMP)'. Yoga was their family tradition and they were not teaching yoga to anyone outside the family and it stayed within the group. During those days, the primary business of the family was traditional Siddha medicine and agriculture. Her family owned coconut and cashew farms in the Kerala state.

Nanammal's husband was a Siddha practitioner and was into agriculture and cultivation, with whom she moved to Negamam and later to Ganapathy. She cultivated a liking towards naturopathy after her marriage. She has five children, 12 grand children and 11 great-grandchildren.

== Yoga ==
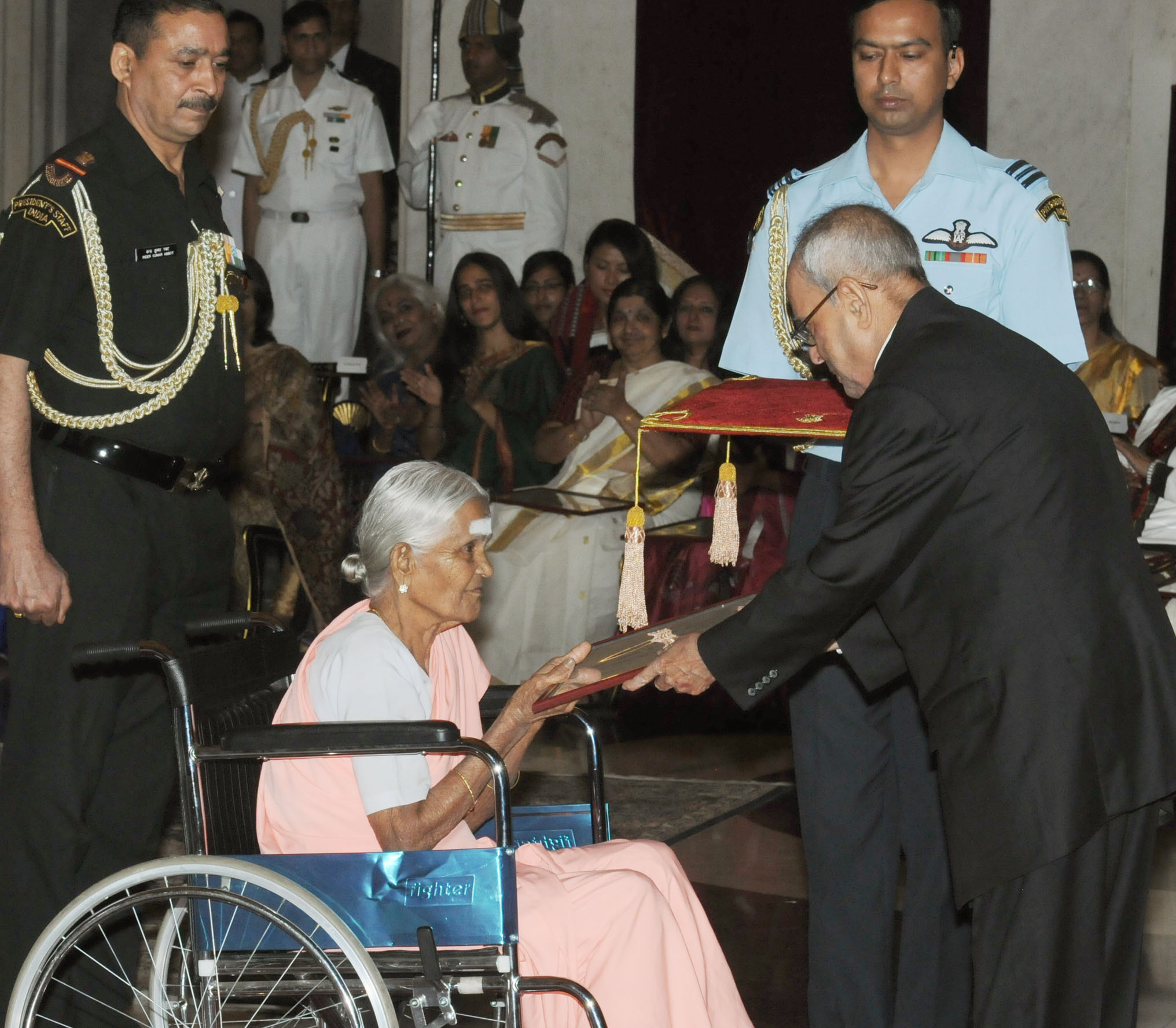
President Pranab Mukherjee presenting the Nari Shakti Puraskar to Nanammal in 2016 on International Women's Day at Rashtrapati Bhavan

Nanammal started practising yoga when she was 8 years old. According to Nanammal, her father knew martial arts and had taught her Yoga. She continued practising yoga throughout her life.

In the year 1972 she established "Ozone Yoga centre" in Coimbatore. Nanammal and her family, follow the traditions passed over to the next generations. The centre taught their traditional style of yoga, which focuses more on Pranayama (Breath control). The 'Ozone Yoga school' was established by her and since then, Nanammal and her family have taught yoga to over 100,000 people.

Over her last five decades, Nanammal trained more than one million students and continued for the remainder of her life to teach 100 students daily at the 'Ozone Yoga Centre'. Around 600 of her students, including 36 members of her family, have become 'Yoga instructors' teaching students around the world. According to her son Balakrishnan, she had trained over 60 family members as Yoga teachers in her lifetime.

== Later life and death ==
Nanammal attempted to get on to the Guinness Book of World Records by teaching yoga to over 20,000 students and enthusiasts in Coimbatore. Her objective was to create awareness among women, mainly girl students, about yoga techniques by going to various educational institutions to solve several health-related problems, especially after marriage. She was also going to take part in Indian reality show 'India's Got Talent' as a contestant. She had gained popularity on YouTube which included videos of her performing difficult yoga positions in her usual attire, a pink sari.

Nannamal suffered a fall from her bed in the autumn of 2019 and was confined to bed thereafter. She died on 26 October 2019, in Coimbatore.

== Legacy ==
She was affectionately known as Yoga Grandma. For her achievement, Nanammal was conferred with the following awards and citations:

- 2016 – National Nari Shakti Puraskar award received from former President of India Pranab Mukherjee
- 2016 – Shwaasa Yoga Organization's Yoga Ratna award
- 2018 – India's fourth highest civilian award the Padma Shri News18 reported her, being the oldest recipient of the award.
- 2018 – Rotary club's Lifetime achievement award
