= Renato Scrollavezza =

Italian luthier (1927–2019)

Renato Scrollavezza (April 14, 1927 – October 14, 2019) was an Italian luthier. He is considered influential in post-war Italian violin making. His daughter, Elisa Scrollavezza, has continued the family activity in Parma alongside her husband, Andrea Zanrè.

== Biography ==
Scrollavezza was born in Castelnuovo Fogliani, Italy on April 14, 1927, to his parents who were farmers. Scrollavezza grew up in Noceto, but during the Second World War his family faced both poverty and famine. He recounted stories of hiding in ditches from planes and escaping bombing. By the age of 18, he weighed 50 kilos and had lost all his teeth.

He started his career has an apprentice to a furniture maker but started to make his own instruments by the age of 17. He taught himself to produce his own instruments until 1950 where he was accepted at the Cremona Violin Making School and later graduated under the tutelage of Peter Tatar in 1954. Scrollavezza then went on to win second place in Cremona's National Violin Making Competition.

In 1975, Giorgio Paini, the president of the Conservatorio Arrigo Boito, invited Scrollavezza to reopen the Parma School of Violin Making as a part of the conservatory. Scrollevazza taught instrument making from 1975 to 2014, with notable students like Jason Price, Andrea Zanrè, and, his daughter, Elisa Scrollavezza. In the 1980s, Scrollavezza stopped producing instruments, focusing on teaching and research.

In 1988, Scrollavezza was selected by the city of Genoa to be the curator of Niccolo Paganini's Il Cannone Guarneri.
