= Gertrude Newsome Jackson =

African-American community activist (1923–2019)

- Born: November 7, 1923; Madison, Illinois, United States
- Died: October 1, 2019 (aged 95); Phillips County, Arkansas, United States
- Occupation: Community activist
- Spouse: Earlis Jackson (married 1944)
- Children: 11
- Parents: Reverend Mitchell Newsome; Lillie Reed Newsome

Gertrude Newsome Jackson (November 7, 1923 – October 1, 2019) was an American community activist in the Delta communities via the Student Nonviolent Coordinating Committee during the Civil Rights Movement.

She was awarded an honorary doctorate from the University of Arkansas at Little Rock on December 20, 2012. Jackson died in October 2019 at the age of 95.

== Early life and education ==
Jackson was born in 1923 in Madison, Illinois, and was one of ten children born to the Newsome's. With six brothers and four sisters there was a full household.

After Gertrude's grandfather died, her father moved the family to Gum Bottom, Arkansas, to take over the eighty-eight-acre cotton farm where she usually stayed in the house but would sometimes come out and help pick cotton.

Jackson graduated in the tenth grade since that was the highest grade able to be completed in Arkansas and several years later returned to earn her GED and continued for two years in college.

She married Earlis "Hog" Jackson in 1943 and they created a family of eleven children. All eleven children graduated from high school and seven attained college degrees.

== Activism ==
During her early years in the civil-rights movement, she first began doing community activism on the local school board to tell about the sewage backup in the "black" Turner Elementary School that her daughter attended. The sewage pipes ran uphill and could not properly function so the sewage would come back down into the bathrooms. Along with her husband, she helped produce a boycott for black families to keep their children out of Turner until the problem was solved, it took three weeks for their voices to be heard.

Soon after the Jackson's first victory, they decided to go after the widespread issue of racial segregation in the Marvell, Arkansas, school district. Throughout the autumn of 1966, a six-week boycott was created by Earlis and Gertrude along with Rev. Anderson at the county fair to yet again keep African-American families out of the schools. In conjunction with a class-action lawsuit, a case was brought to the United States Court of Appeals for the Eighth Circuit which led to the decision of fully desegregating classes, faculty, and students in the beginning school year of 1970.

Due to their successful community activism, the Jackson's faced repercussions of arson destroying family farming equipment, shots being fired at them, burning crosses in their yard, and farm equipment being sabotaged by sugar being placed in the gas tank of their cotton picker. Even though in her childhood, Gertrude stated that racism did not affect her.

One day in 1978 it just "dropped in her spirit" to help establish the Boys, Girls, Adults Community Development Center in Marvell to help her community with education, healthcare, housing, and much more. Later on in her life, Jackson worked for Mid Delta Community Service as a transporter of children to its Head Start Programs.

Jackson stated to all African-American communities to "Know what you need to know, stand up for yourself, and get involved." and "Stand up, be bold, and get something done!"

== See also ==
- List of people from Arkansas
- List of people from Illinois
