= Wen Chuanyuan =

Chinese aeronautical and automation engineer (1918–2019)

- Born: 22 June 1918; Hengshan County, Hunan, Republic of China
- Died: 1 October 2019 (aged 101); Beijing, People's Republic of China

Chinese name
- Simplified Chinese: 文传源
- Traditional Chinese: 文傳源
Transcriptions
Standard Mandarin
- Hanyu Pinyin: Wén Chuányuán
- Wade–Giles: Wên² Chʻuan²-yüan²
- IPA: [wə̌n ʈʂʰwǎn.ɥɛ̌n]

Wen Chuanyuan (Chinese: 文传源; 22 June 1918 – 1 October 2019) was a Chinese aeronautical and automation engineer. He was a professor and co-founder of the School of Automation Science and Electrical Engineering at Beihang University. He developed China's first unmanned aerial vehicle (UAV) in 1959 and first flight simulator in 1983. He was awarded the State Science and Technology Progress Award (First Class) in 1985.

== Early life and education ==
Wen was born 22 June 1918 in Xinqiao Township, Hengshan County, Hunan. His father, Wen Bingnan, was a farmer. He entered Yue Yun Middle School in Changsha in 1933, and Hunan No. 1 Normal School in 1936. When the Second Sino-Japanese War broke out in July 1937, Wen and other high school students received military training organized by the provincial chairman Zhang Zhizhong.

After the 1938 Changsha fire, Wen attempted to organize a guerrilla force to resist Japanese invasion in Hunan, but was unsuccessful. He moved to Northwest China, which was free from Japanese occupation, and studied aeronautical engineering at the Northwestern Engineering Institute.

== Career ==
=== Republic of China ===
Upon graduation in 1943, Wen was assigned to work at the No. 4 Aircraft Factory in Guilin, under the Republic of China Air Force. After the surrender of Japan in 1945, Wen joined the faculty of the Republic of China Air Force Academy in Jianqiao, Hangzhou. In 1948, during the Chinese Civil War, Wen resigned from the Jianqiao Academy and returned to Hunan. He joined the Chinese Communist Party in February 1949 and served as a political commissar in the Communist guerrilla force in Hunan.

=== Early People's Republic of China ===
After the founding of the People's Republic of China, Wen joined the training department of the newly established People's Liberation Army Air Force in December 1949. He served as a mechanics advisor and wrote three textbooks for aeronautical engineering, including The Structure of the MiG-15 Aircraft.

Wen became an associate professor of North China University in July 1951. When the Communist government reorganized China's higher education on the Soviet model in 1952, Wen was transferred to the newly created Beijing Institute of Aeronautics and Astronautics (now Beihang University). At Beihang, he co-founded the department of aircraft equipment, a predecessor of the School of Automation Science and Electrical Engineering, and served as its chair. He became a full professor in 1962.

In 1957, Wen and his group proposed building an unmanned aerial vehicle (UAV) or drone. Although Soviet experts cast doubt on his proposal, Beihang's president Wu Guang presented it to Premier Zhou Enlai, who approved the project. As chief designer, Wen based his design of the UAV on the Nanchang Y-5 transport aircraft. In February 1959, China's first UAV, dubbed Beijing No. 5, completed its maiden flight in Beijing.

=== Cultural Revolution and later career ===
When the Cultural Revolution broke out in 1966, Wen was persecuted and repeatedly beaten and humiliated, sometimes by his own students. However, when university education resumed after the end of the revolution in 1976, he forgave his former tormenters and continued to teach the students who had beaten him.

In 1975, Wen was appointed the lead designer of China's first flight simulator. The system was approved for use in 1983, and won the State Science and Technology Progress Award (First Class) in 1985. In 1987, Wen founded the Flight Control System Research Center at Beihang. He co-founded the China System Simulation Association in 1988 and served as its first president.

Although nominally retired in 1988, he taught at Beihang until 2003. He donated more than 150,000 yuan to the university for student scholarships. In September 2018, he was conferred the "Lide Shuren Achievement Award" by the university.

Wen died on 1 October 2019 in Beijing. He was 101 years old.
