= Philip J. Prygoski =

American legal scholar (1947–2019)

- Born: December 7, 1947
- Died: October 5, 2019 (aged 71)
- Education: University of Michigan (BA, JD, MA, LL.M.)
- Occupation: Professor of Constitutional Law
- Employer: Thomas M. Cooley Law School
- Known for: Author and editor of legal texts

Philip Jerome Prygoski (December 7, 1947 – October 5, 2019) was a professor of constitutional law at Thomas Cooley Law School and former administrative law judge at the Michigan Department of Licensing and Regulation. He earned a Bachelor of Arts degree at the University of Michigan in 1969. He then earned a Juris Doctor degree at the University of Michigan in 1973. He also held a Master of Arts degree from the University of Michigan, conferred in 1978, and a Master of Laws degree from the University of Michigan, conferred in 1983.

Professor Prygoski authored Sum and Substance: Constitutional Law, an edited volume on U.S. Constitutional law. He was a member of the American Law Institute (ALI).

On October 5, 2019, Phillip J. Prygoski died.

== Books ==
- Prygoski, Philip J. (editor), Sum and Substance: Constitutional Law 4th ed., Minneapolis, Minn.: West Pub. Co. (1998). (out of print).
- Prygoski, Philip J. (editor), Sum and Substance: Constitutional Law 3rd ed., Minneapolis, Minn.: West Pub. Co. (1997). (out of print).
- Prygoski, Philip J. (editor), Sum and Substance: Constitutional Law 1st and 2nd eds., Minneapolis, Minn.: West Pub. Co. (1996). (out of print).

== Selected publications ==
- Prygoski, Philip J. "War As the Prevailing Metaphor in Federal Indian Law Jurisprudence: An Exercise in Judicial Activism" 14 Cooley Law Review 491 (1997).
- Prygoski, Philip J., "The Implications of Davis v. Davis for Reproductive Rights Analysis," 61 Tennessee Law Review 609 (1994).
- Prygoski, Philip J., "Abortion and the Right to Die: Judicial Imposition of a Theory of Life," 23 Seton Hall Law Review 67 (1992).
- Prygoski, Philip J., "Will v. Michigan Department of State Police: The Eleventh Amendment in State Courts," 43 Oklahoma Law Review 429 (1990).
- Prygoski, Philip J., "The Supreme Court's 'Secondary Effects' Analysis in Free Speech Cases," 6 Cooley Law Review 1 (1988).
- Prygoski, Philip J., "Low-Value Speech from Young to Fraser," 32 St. Louis University Law Journal 317 (1987).
- Prygoski, Philip J., "Justice Sanford and Modern Free Speech Analysis: Back to the Future," 75 Kentucky Law Journal J 45 (1986).
- Prygoski, Philip J., "Of Predispositions and Dispositions: An Attitudinal Study of Decisionmaking in Child Abuse and Neglect Cases," 21 Houston Law Review 883 (1984).
- Prygoski, Philip J., "When a Hearing is not a Hearing: Irrebuttable Presumption and Termination of Parental Rights Based on Status," 44 University of Pittsburgh Law Review 879 (1983).
- Prygoski, Philip J., "Due Process and Designated Members of Administrative Tribunals," 33 Administrative Law Review 441 (1981).
- Prygoski, Philip J., "Supreme Court Review of Congressional Action in the Federalism Area," 18 Duquesne Law Review 197 (1980).

== Other writings ==
- Prygoski, Philip J., The Rights of a Pregnant Woman: Conflicts in the Law? Compleat Lawyer (existed 1984-1998) (Fall 1998).
- Prygoski, Philip J., The Supreme Court's Treatment of Tribal Sovereignty From Marshall to Marshall Compleat Lawyer (existed 1984-1998) (Fall 1995).
