= Murray Feshbach =

American scholar

Murray Feshbach, July 24, 2007

Murray Feshbach (August 8, 1929 – October 25, 2019) was an American scholar focusing on the demographics of the Soviet Union and demographics of Russia, including population, health, and environment. He was a Senior Scholar at the Woodrow Wilson Center where he conducted research on the policy implications of the demographic, health and environmental crises in Russia.[1] He was a frequently turned-to source for both detailed analysis and a broad understanding of trends in the USSR and then the Former Soviet Union.

His work had a major impact on the Western Bloc understanding of the Soviet Union, Russia and Eastern Europe. His role in sharing data, and in providing guidance to students and research assistants, helped shape a generation of scholars who came after him. Over time he moved from general demographic analysis to a focus on the impact of the Soviet population of problems in the health care system and ecological degradation. His pioneering article analyzing infant mortality trends in the USSR led to internal improvements which likely saved many lives.

His first major book, "Ecocide in the USSR" with Alfred Friendly Jr., outlined the ways in which the medical system and environmental disasters were significant factors in the end of the Soviet Union. He was among the first in the West to identify a major decline in the size of the ethnic Russian population, and to grapple with its internal implications and its potential impact on Soviet and Russian policy.

== Early life ==
Feshbach was born in New York. He received his Bachelor of Arts degree in history from Syracuse University, his Master of Arts in European diplomatic history from Columbia University, and his Ph.D. in economics from American University.

"He served as Chief of the USSR Population, Employment and Research and Development Branch of the Foreign Demographic Analysis Division (now the Center for International Research) of the Census Bureau from 1957 to 1981. In 1979-1980 he was a Fellow of the Kennan Institute. After his retirement from the U.S. government in 1981, he worked as a Research Professor at Georgetown University until 2000, when he retired as Professor Emeritus. At the request of the Department of State, in 1986-1987 he served in Brussels, Belgium as the first Sovietologist-in-Residence, in the Office of the Secretary General of NATO".[2]

== Major publications ==
Feshbach has published a number of books and over 115 articles and book chapters, and has presented papers at numerous international and domestic conferences, as well as testimony for the U.S. Congress.

- His book, Ecocide in the USSR: Health and Nature Under Siege (with Alfred Friendly Jr.), New York, Basic Books, was published in April 1992. The book also was translated into Russian and published in Moscow in January 1993.
- His book on Ecological Disaster: Cleaning Up the Hidden Legacy of the Soviet Regime was published by the Twentieth Century Fund in February 1995.
- Under his chief editorship, an Environmental and Health Atlas of Russia was simultaneously published in Russian and English in June 1995 in Moscow.
- Another book, Russia's Health and Demographic Crises was published by the Chemical and Biological Arms Control Institute in April 2003.

Other publications of note include:

- Rising Infant Mortality in the USSR in the 1970s, April 1981.
- The Early Days of the HIV/AIDS Epidemic in the Former Soviet Union, Prepared for the Conference on “Health and Demography in the Former Soviet Union,” Harvard University, April 2005
- HIV/AIDS in Ukraine: An Analysis of Statistics, with Cristina M. Galvin, Research Associate, March 2005
- HIV/AIDS in the Russian Military – Update*, Prepared for UNAIDS Meeting, 22–23 February 2005, Copenhagen, Denmark
- Potential Social Disarray in Russia Due to Health Factors
- HIV/AIDS in Russia: An Analysis of Statistics, written with Cristina M. Galvin, Research Associate, January 2005
- “Russia's Health and Demographic Crises: Policy Implications and Consequences,” Health and National Security Series (Chemical and Biological Arms Control Institute, April 2003)
- "A Country on the Verge," op-ed, The New York Times, May 31, 2003
- “Russia's Demographic and Health Meltdown,” U.S. Congress, Joint Economic Committee, Russia's Uncertain Economic Future, 107th Congress, 1st Session (Government Printing Office, December 2001)
