= Robert Ramage (chemist) =

Organic chemist

Robert 'Bob' Ramage FRS (4 October 1935 — 16 October 2019) was an organic chemist, born in Glasgow, who specialised in the synthesis and biosynthesis of natural products, peptides, and proteins.

Following his undergraduate degree in chemistry and the University of Glasgow, he stayed on for a PhD in organic chemistry. After his time at Glasgow, he followed his interest in natural products synthesis to Harvard and then Basel, before taking up a lectureship in organic chemistry at the University of Liverpool where his attention was drawn to peptides.

His peptide synthesis research continued at the University of Manchester Institute of Science and Technology (UMIST), where he also served as head of department. He returned to Scotland in 1984, taking up the Forbes chair of organic chemistry at the University of Edinburgh, where he remained until retirement in 2000.

Outside of academia, in 1994 he founded the company Albachem, which utilised his work with peptides.

He was elected Fellow of the Royal Society of Chemistry (1977), Royal Society of Edinburgh (1986), and the Royal Society (1992).
