= Md. Golam Mostofa =

Golam Mostofa
- Born: c. 1949
- Died: 10 October 2019 (aged 70)
- Spouse: Shamima Aktar
- Children: 4
- Parents: Golam Md. Falu Sheikh (father); Amena Asia Aktar (mother)

Golam Mostofa (c. 1949 – 10 October 2019) was a Bangladeshi freedom fighter. He was awarded Bir Bikrom and Bir Protik for his contribution to the Liberation War of Bangladesh.

== Biography ==
Golam Mostofa's father was Golam Md. Falu Sheikh and mother Amena Asia Aktar. He was in army in 1971. After the declaration of independence of Bangladesh, he decided to take part in the Bangladesh Liberation War. At first he fought in Sector 3. Later he joined S Force.

On 14 August 1971 Pakistanis congregated more soldiers in Madhabpur of Greater Sylhet. Golam Mostofa and other freedom fighters decided to ambush them. They weren't able to do that because two companions of Pakistanis informed them. After knowing their movements Pakistanis surrounded them. Mostofa and other freedom fighters decided to defend as it was not easy to attack Pakistanis at that time. They were able to foil the plan of Pakistanis after some hours.

On 6 December 1971 Golam Mostofa was injured in a Battle in Chandua, Brahmanbaria. He had to cut one of his legs after this injury. After independence he was awarded Bir Bikrom and Bir Protik from Bangladesh Government for his contribution to the Liberation War of Bangladesh

Golam Mostofa was married to Shamima Aktar. They had four sons.

Golam Mostofa died on 10 October 2019 at the age of 70.
