= Hussein Adel Madani =

Iraqi cartoonist (died 2019)

Hussein Adel Madani (died 3 October 2019) was an Iraqi cartoonist and political activist. He was a supporter of the 2018–19 Iraqi protests and took part in them. He was killed with his wife by unknown masked gunmen at his home on 3 October 2019, at the time of the protests. It is not known who was behind their killings and if their death was linked to the protests.
