= Gerry Dalton =

Irish sculptor (c.1935–2019)

- Born: Gerry Dalton; 1935 near Athlone, Ireland
- Died: October 2019 (aged 83–84)

Gerard "Gerry" Dalton (1935 – October 2019) was an Irish sculptor known for his sculpture garden referred to as "Gerry’s Pompeii".

== Life ==
Dalton was born near Athlone, Ireland in 1935, into a farming family. Due to childhood asthma, Dalton to not complete his formal education. He later worked as a gardener to retired colonel, Harry Rice. Rice and his wife encouraged Dalton's interest in history and mythology. He moved to London in 1959, working as a night porter at Paddington Station, in an aviation factory, and at the Institute of Directors on Pall Mall in the kitchen. He spent his weekends at the British Library or visiting London's churches. Some accounts of his life mention a wife or partner named Nell or Nelly, but this is not corroborated.

He lived on Fermoy Road, Paddington, until he moved to one-bedroom ground-floor council flat at 34A Hormead Road, Paddington in 1983. Dalton became known posthumously for the sculpture garden he created at his home on Hormead road, with the space becoming known as "Gerry’s Pompeii". He began making the sculptures when he retired in the 1990s, beginning in the garden but also decorating the inside of his flat with replicas of buildings including Hampton Court and Buckingham Palace. The sculptures are made from concrete and clay and include historical figures such as Prince George of Denmark, Richard Talbot, 1st Earl of Tyrconnell, and Oliver Cromwell.

Dalton died in October 2019, aged 83.

== Legacy ==
Immediately after his death, Dalton's sculptures were the focus of a campaign to preserve his garden and flat, leaving his work in-situ, including a campaign to raise funds to purchase the flat from the landlord, Notting Hill Genesis. His family initially supported this campaign, but later removed all of his work from the residence in 2020. By 2025, all that remained was a small fraction of his work mounted along a 30 metre stretch of Grand Union Canal lined with a series of his sculptures.

Among those who have commented on his work are Richard Wentworth who stated that he had "seldom been so affected", and Hans Ulrich Obrist who has called the work "an extraordinary gestamtkunstwerk [a total work of art]". The documentary, Gerry’s Pompeii, was released in 2023.
