= Han Qiwei =

Chinese hydraulic engineer (1933–2019)

- Born: November 2, 1933; Songzi, Hubei, China
- Died: October 1, 2019 (aged 85); Beijing, China
- Education: Wuhan University
- Scientific career
- Fields: Hydraulics
- Workplaces: China Water Conservancy and Hydropower Research Institute

Chinese name
- Traditional Chinese: 韓其為
- Simplified Chinese: 韩其为
Transcriptions
Standard Mandarin
- Hanyu Pinyin: Hán Qíwéi

Han Qiwei (Chinese: 韩其为; 2 November 1933 – 1 October 2019) was a Chinese hydraulic engineer and an academician of the Chinese Academy of Engineering.

== Biography ==
Han was born in Songzi, Hubei, on 2 November 1933. In 1956 he graduated from today's Wuhan University. From 1962 to 1980 he worked at the River Research Laboratory, Changjiang Academy of Sciences. He worked at China Water Conservancy and Hydropower Research Institute since 1980. He was elected an academician of the Chinese Academy of Engineering (CAE) in 2001. He died of illness in Beijing, aged 86.
