= Wei Zhongquan =

Chinese satellite designer (1937–2019)

- Traditional Chinese: 魏鍾銓
- Simplified Chinese: 魏锺铨
Transcriptions
Standard Mandarin
- Hanyu Pinyin: Wèi Zhōngquán
- IPA: [wêɪ ʈʂʊ́ŋ.tɕʰwǎn]

Wei Zhongquan (Chinese: 魏锺铨; November 1937 – 3 October 2019) was a Chinese satellite engineer who served as vice president and chief engineer of the Shanghai Satellite Engineering Institute. He was the chief designer of the Fengyun-2, China's first geostationary meteorological satellite, and the Yaogan-1, China's first remote sensing satellite.

== Life and career ==
Wei was born in November 1937 in Wuxi, Jiangsu, Republic of China. He studied at Nanyang Model High School in Shanghai and tested into the mathematics department of Fudan University in 1954.

When Mao Zedong decided to develop China's own artificial satellite in 1958, Wei joined the satellite program at the Institute of Electronics of the Chinese Academy of Sciences (CAS) upon graduation that year. He excelled in research and developed a specialized digital computer in 1964 to enhance the ability to detect weak communication signals. For this contribution he was named a model worker of the CAS in that year. In 1965, he participated in the design of the telemetry, tracking and command (TT&C) system of the Dong Fang Hong I, China's first satellite, as an assistant to Chen Fangyun.

In 1969, Wei was transferred to the newly established Shanghai Huayin Machinery Factory, the predecessor of the Shanghai Satellite Engineering Institute (code name 509 Institute) of the Shanghai Academy of Spaceflight Technology. He served as deputy chief engineer and was later promoted to vice president and chief satellite engineer of the institute.

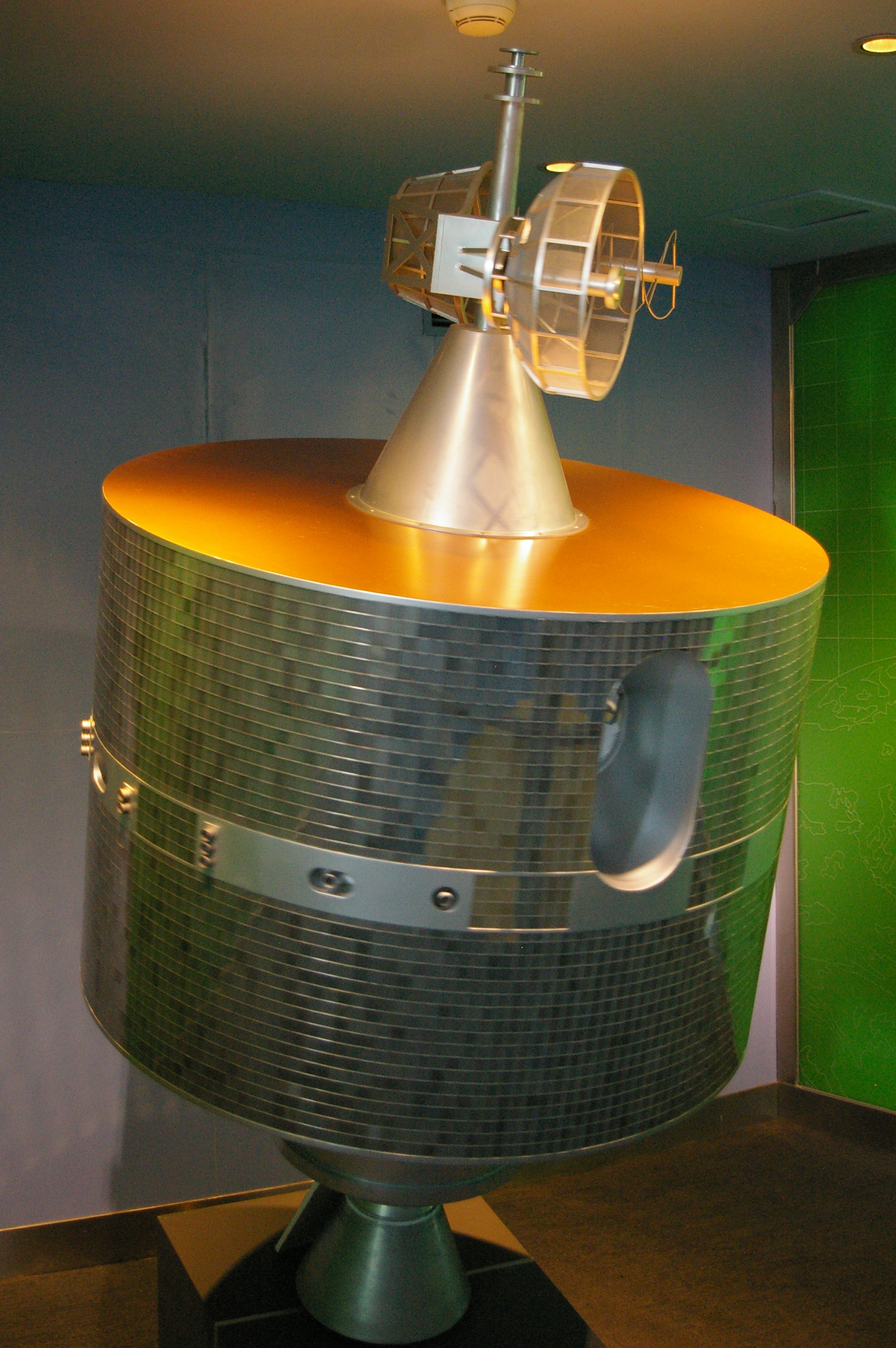
Model of the Fengyun-2 satellite

In 1982, Wei joined the research program for the Fengyun-2, China's first geostationary meteorological satellite, and was named its chief designer when the project was officially inaugurated. After 12 years of development, the first Fengyun-2 satellite was transported to the Xichang Satellite Launch Center in 1994. On the eve of the scheduled launch the satellite suddenly burst into flames, injuring many workers. Wei was rescued from the site by his colleagues. After the failure, Wei and his team spent another three years analyzing and fixing the problems. The Fengyun-2 satellite was successfully launched on 12 June 1997, and was awarded the National Defence Science and Technology Progress Award (First Class).

At age 62, Wei was appointed chief designer of the Yaogan-1, China's first remote sensing satellite. Following seven years of research and development, the satellite was successfully launched on 27 April 2006. In the aftermath of the Great Sichuan earthquake of 2008, the photographs taken by the satellite provided guidance to the rescue operation.

== Personal life ==
Wei was married to Yao Zenghui (姚增辉), and the couple had a daughter, Wei Wei (魏蔚). According to his daughter, he travelled for business almost every week when she was young and had little time to spend with her. At home, he rarely talked about his work as it was classified. Wei was an avid fan and amateur singer of Peking opera.

== Death and legacy ==
Wei worked until the last days of his life. In September 2019, he travelled to Beijing and Taiyuan to prepare for the launch of the Gaofen-10 high-resolution earth observation satellite. On 29 September 2019, he again travelled from Shanghai to the Taiyuan Satellite Launch Center to participate in the launch, but fell ill the next day. He died in hospital three days later on 3 October, aged 81. The satellite was successfully launched two days after his death.

Following another successful launch of the Gaofen-12 satellite on 28 November 2019, the Shanghai Academy of Spaceflight Technology held a ceremony to dedicate Wei Zhongquan's cenotaph at the martyrs' cemetery of the Taiyuan Satellite Launch Center.
