= Dorothea Buck =

German writer and sculptor (1917–2019)

- Born: 5 April 1917; Naumburg, Germany
- Died: 9 October 2019 (aged 102); Hamburg, Germany
- Other name: Sophie Zerchin
- Occupations: Writer, sculptor, activist, advocate

Dorothea Buck (5 April 1917 – 9 October 2019) was a German writer and sculptor, diagnosed with schizophrenia at the age of 19. She was a victim of German psychiatrists during the Nazi dictatorship who sterilized her by force; she subsequently became an advocate for psychiatric reform.

== Early life ==
Buck was born in 1917, the fourth of five siblings born to a pastor father and a teacher mother, in Naumburg, where she grew up.

In 1936, at the age of nineteen, she was diagnosed with schizophrenia at Bodelschwingh Foundation Bethel. There she was exposed to baths and cold water head pourings for "disciplining", then common practices of psychiatry in the first half of the 20th century. She found the "complete speechlessness" to be especially humiliating: patients did not speak to each other and conversations between staff and patients were unusual.

According to the "Law for the Prevention of Diseased Offspring", Buck was forcibly sterilized in the Bodelschwingh Foundation Bethel on 18 September 1936. Buck was institutionalized four more times after being released from Bethel, a Christian hospital in what is now the German city of Bielefeld. She was sometimes treated with electroshock therapy, and after her last psychotic episode, in 1959, was injected with a "high dosages of antipsychotic drugs".

== Career ==
After World War II, Buck began to work as a sculptor. From 1969 to 1982, she was an art teacher in Hamburg. After her last treatment, in the early 1960s, Buck became an advocate for mental health, introducing an approach that gave value to patients' experiences.

She wrote an autobiography, published in 1990, under the pseudonym, Sophie Zerchin (an anagram of the German word for "schizophrenia"), entitled On the Trail of the Morning Star: Psychosis as Self-Discovery.

In 2011, she created the Dorothea Buck Foundation for mutual support of psychiatric patients.

Buck introduced an approach called "trialogue" with the head of the Special Outpatient Clinic for Psychosis at the University Medical Center Hamburg-Eppendorf and colleagues, which "gives equal weight to the experience of the mental health professional, the mental health service user, and the patient's family". Buck pushed the German psychiatric profession to confront the role its members had played under the Nazi regime. The German Association for Psychiatry, Psychotherapy and Psychosomatics created a travelling exhibition about it.

Buck died in Hamburg in October 2019 at the age of 102.

Alexandra Pohlmeier made a documentary film about Buck, entitled The Sky and Beyond - On The Trail of Dorothea Buck.

== Awards ==
- Order of Merit of the Federal Republic of Germany – 2008
- Hamburg Senate recognition – 2017
