= Yang Enze =

Chinese telecommunications engineer (1919–2019)

- Traditional Chinese: 楊恩澤
- Simplified Chinese: 杨恩泽
Transcriptions
Standard Mandarin
- Hanyu Pinyin: Yáng Ēnzé
- Wade–Giles: Yang^{2} Ên^{1}-tsê^{2}
- IPA: [jǎŋ ɤn.tsɤ̌]

Yang Enze (Chinese: 杨恩泽; 20 October 1919 – 9 October 2019) was a Chinese telecommunications engineer who served as Chief Engineer of Wuhan Post and Telecommunications Institute and President of the Institute of Fiber-Optic Technology at Tianjin University. He led the development of the "82 Project", China's first fiber-optic communication system that was approved for practical use. He won the National Science Congress Award in 1978 and the State Science and Technology Progress Award (Second Class) in 1985.

== Early life and education ==
Yang was born on 20 October 1919 in Raoping County, Guangdong, Republic of China. He was admitted to Wuhan University in 1937, shortly before the outbreak of the Second Sino-Japanese War. Before Wuhan fell to the invading Japanese Army, the university evacuated to Leshan in Sichuan province, where Yang and his fellow students studied in between Japanese bombing raids. He earned his bachelor's and master's degrees in telecommunications in 1941 and 1943, respectively.

== Career ==
After graduation, Yang taught at Wuhan University, Sun Yat-sen University, Nankai University, Tianjin University, and Beijing Institute of Posts and Telecommunications. In 1974, he transferred to Wuhan Post and Telecommunications Institute, where he led the research project of "quasi-millimeter-wave spatial telecommunication system". It won the 1978 National Science Congress Award. He later became chief engineer of the institute.

In 1978, Yang was appointed chief engineer of the "82 Project" and tasked with building China's first fiber-optic communication system. The system, spanning 13.6 kilometres (8.5 mi), would link the districts of Wuchang and Hankou of Wuhan, which are separated by the Yangtze river. Fiber-optic communication was a new technology at the time and there had been no prior research in the field in China. Yang and his colleagues overcame many technical difficulties, including the loss of signals and limitation in the length of the optical fibre. The system was approved by the Chinese government for practical use in 1982, the first in the country. The project laid the foundation for the rapid development of the fiber-optic industry in China, and fiber-optic communication systems were subsequently built in many other cities. The project won the State Science and Technology Progress Award (Second Class) in 1985, as well as provincial and ministerial awards.

Yang returned to Tianjin University in 1985 to serve as President of the Institute of Fiber-Optic Technology, where he built the first fiber-optic laboratory in the city of Tianjin. He retired from the position in 1988, but kept teaching at the university until the age of 99 (100 in East Asian age reckoning).

In 2005, Yang donated 300,000 yuan to construct a science building at the central primary school of his hometown Raoping County. Over his remaining years, he also donated about 500,000 yuan to help needy students in Raoping.

== Personal life ==
Yang played tennis until he was 93 and taught till the last year of his life. He attributed his longevity to exercise and persistence. He had a son, Yang Shi (杨石).

Yang died from cerebral hemorrhage on 9 October 2019, 11 days before his 100th birthday.
