= Ed Maley =

American judoka

Personal information
- Occupation: Judoka

Sport
- Sport: Judo
- Rank: 9th dan black belt

Ed Maley was a 9th dan judoka from the United States. He was featured in Black Belt Magazine multiple times.

== Judo career ==
Maley was born in Brooklyn, New York City. He was inducted into the Black Belt Magazine Hall of Fame in 1980. Ed Maley taught judo for 65 years, starting judo as a teenager in New York city and continuing while in the Air Force. From 1959-1965, he was the Florida State Champion. Maley taught in Florida, his school opened in 1963. He trained many national champions during his training. Maley died on October 2, 2019, at the age of 87.
