= William Timberlake =

Ethological psychologist

William D. Timberlake
- Born: November 19, 1942
- Died: October 17, 2019 (aged 76)

William D. Timberlake (19 November 1942 – 17 October 2019) was a psychologist and animal behavior scientist. His work included behavioral economics, contrast effects, spatial cognition, adjunctive behavior, time horizons, and circadian entrainment of feeding and drug use. He is best known for his theoretical work: Behavior Systems Theory and the Disequilibrium Theory of reinforcement.

== Education and Career ==
Timberlake earned his PhD in experimental psychology at University of Michigan in 1969 under the supervision of David Birch. He joined the Indiana University psychology faculty the same year, where he remained for the rest of his career, becoming adjunct member of the biology department, and member of the cognitive science programme.

Timberlake was the key mover behind the establishment of the interdepartmental animal behavior programme and Center for the Integrative Study of Animal Behavior (CISAB) at Indiana University (co-founded with biologist Ellen Ketterson). CISAB is a cross-disciplinary research and training unit designed to engender cross-disciplinary cooperation, for which its independence from any department was considered important. The animal behavior programme was among the world's first academic entities to issue degrees specifically in animal behavior.

Timberlake established (with co-chair, James Holland) an ethics committee to oversee animal research on the Bloomington campus (the ancestor of today's BIACUC, Bloomington Institutional Animal Use and Care Committee). Timberlake also established research ethics courses and assured that they remained a part of core curricula of the animal behaviour programme at Indiana University. He served on the Campus Committee on Teaching Ethics in Science from 1989, then on the Board of Fellows of the Poynter Center for the Study of Ethics from 1993.

Timberlake coined the term theriomorphic. A theriomorphic approach is species-centred, one that is based on an explicit model of the animal studied.

=== Behaviour systems ===
Timberlake's behaviour systems approach rejects the separation of functional capacities, such as learning, from the particulars of performance, and begins by modelling performance in a given species and environment. The resultant model is then used to frame an understanding of the focal construct in a specific context.

=== Disequilibrium theory ===
Timberlake's disequilibrium approach to reinforcement (also known as: behaviour regulation theory, response deprivation theory, molar equilibrium theory, and disequilibrium theory) resituates the locus of behaviour change from a response strengthening power of particular environmental stimuli envisioned in mainstream views, like food, to constrained activities, like eating. Reinforcement is attributed to the animal's correcting deficits in relative activity rates.

== Legacy ==
Timberlake's work continues to be highly influential. His work features in multiple chapters of field textbooks (e.g. Domjan's "Principles of learning and behavior"; Sara Shettleworth's "Cognition, evolution, and behavior"). Timberlake's scientific contributions have been recognised with awards, including the Pavlovian Society's Research Award. He served on the editorial boards of all the field's major journals. Timberlake was a fellow of the American Association for the Advancement of Science, was a fellow and held multiple offices of three APA (American Psychological Association) divisions, and served as president of APA's Division 6. In 2019, a special issue of Behavioural Processes dedicated to Timberlake's influence was published.
