= William W. Outerbridge =

United States Navy Rear admiral

William Woodward Outerbridge
- Born: April 14, 1906; Victoria, Hong Kong
- Died: September 20, 1986 (aged 80); Tifton, Georgia
- Military career
- Allegiance: United States
- Branch: United States Navy
- Service years: 1927–1957
- Rank: Rear Admiral
- Commands: Ward (DD-139); O'Brien (DD-725); Destroyer Division Forty-Two; Destroyer Squadron Four; Los Angeles (CA-135)
- Conflicts: World War II
- Awards: Navy Cross, Legion of Merit

William Woodward Outerbridge (14 April 1906 – 20 September 1986) was a Rear Admiral in the United States Navy. He held the distinction of firing the first shots in defense of the United States during World War II.

== Biography ==
Outerbridge was born in Victoria, Hong Kong, and was raised in Middleport, Ohio. He attended Middleport High School and graduated from Marion Military Institute in Alabama. He was then appointed to the United States Naval Academy from which he graduated in 1927. He served in various capacities on ships and ashore, including 3½ years on the China Station (1937–40) aboard the heavy cruiser Augusta (CA-31). In 1940-41 he was Executive Officer of the destroyer Cummings (DD-365), and on December 5, 1941 he was appointed as the captain of the destroyer Ward (DD-139), stationed at Pearl Harbor, Hawaii.

=== December 7, 1941 ===
Early in the morning of December 7, 1941, the Ward, while on patrol near the entrance to Pearl Harbor, was alerted by the cargo ship Antares (AG-10) to the presence of a Japanese midget submarine attempting to infiltrate into the harbor entrance. The Ward opened fire with her number three deck gun, then dropped depth charges, and sank the submarine. Outerbridge's radio reports were discounted by senior officers at naval headquarters despite his efforts to emphasize that there could be no mistake, sending a second report with more explicit detail: "We have attacked, fired upon, and dropped depth charges upon submarine operating in defensive sea area." This happened just 70 minutes before the Japanese naval air forces commenced their attacks on Pearl Harbor. The action by the Ward's crew was thus the first naval action against the Japanese by U.S. forces in World War II, and the gun that fired the first shot was installed as a memorial at the Minnesota State Capitol in Saint Paul, Minnesota. The midget submarine the Ward sank that morning was finally located in August 2002 in 1,300 feet (400 m) of water just outside Pearl Harbor.

For this action Outerbridge was subsequently awarded the Navy Cross.

=== World War II ===
From 1942 Outerbridge worked at the Office of the Chief of Naval Transportation in Washington, D.C., before being given command of the destroyer O'Brien (DD-725) in June 1944.

On D-Day the O'Brien stood off the coast of Normandy, and helped protect Allied forces landing on the beaches, by using her guns to attack German defenses near the landing zones. Later the O'Brien performed a similar action off the French port of Cherbourg as Allied ground forces captured the city.

Outerbridge and the O'Brien were then reassigned to the Pacific Fleet to participate in the liberation of the Philippines. In a strange twist of fate, on December 7, 1944, during the landings at Leyte Gulf, Outerbridge was ordered to use the O'Brien's deck guns to sink the Ward, which had been severely damaged in a Japanese kamikaze attack.

=== Post-war ===
After World War II Outerbridge continued in his naval career, serving as the commander of Destroyer Division 42 in 1945–46, before joining the staff of the Naval War College. In 1949 he returned to sea in command of Destroyer Squadron Four, and served as Chief of Staff and Aide to the Commander of Destroyer Flotilla Four in 1950–51. He was on the staff of the Industrial College of the Armed Forces in 1951–52, and served as Assistant Chief of Staff for Plans, Operations and Intelligence, Naval Forces, Far East in 1952–53.

Outerbridge commanded the cruiser Los Angeles (CA-135) from 1953 to 1955, then served as Head of the Transportation and Petroleum Branch in the Office of the Chief of Naval Operations (Logistics, Plans). He retired in 1957, receiving promotion to rear admiral.

Outerbridge taught school in the area of science in the late 1960s at an elementary and junior high private school, Gulfstream School, located in the town of Gulf Stream, Florida (near Delray Beach). He also taught biology at the Sidwell Friends School in Washington, D.C. for one year, 1965–1966.

Outerbridge died at his home in Tifton, Georgia on 20 September 1986.

Outerbridge was portrayed by Jerry Fogel in the 1970 film Tora! Tora! Tora!.
