= USS Condor (AMc-14) =

Minesweeper of the United States Navy

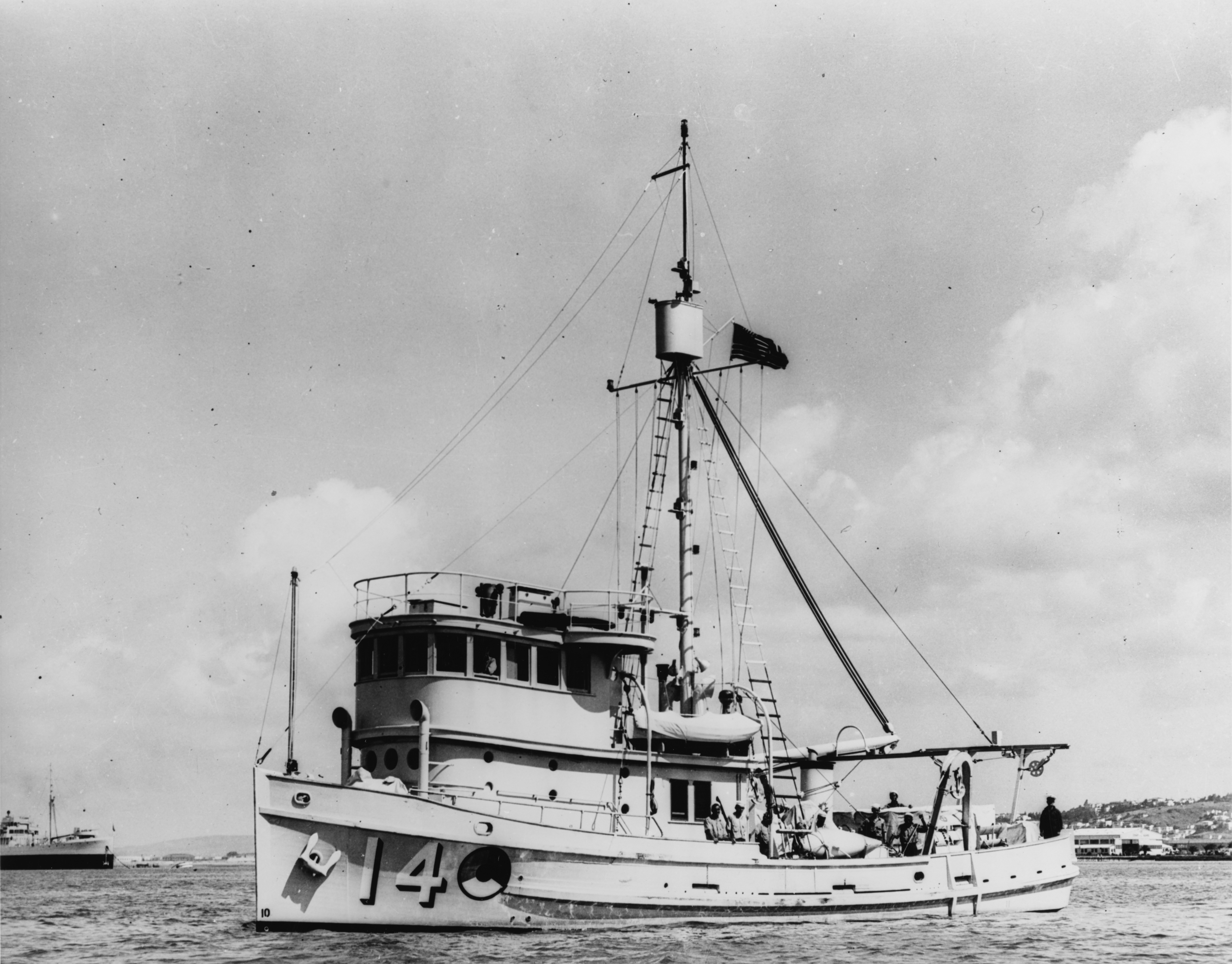
- USS Condor (AMc-14) Photographed in 1941, probably off San Diego, California

History

United States
- Name: USS Condor
- Namesake: Condor
- Launched: 1937, as New Example
- Acquired: 28 October 1940
- In service: 18 April 1941
- Out of service: 17 January 1946
- Stricken: 7 February 1946
- Fate: Transferred to the Maritime Commission, 24 July 1946

General characteristics
- Type: Coastal minesweeper
- Displacement: 185 long tons (188 t)
- Length: 85 ft 11 in (26.19 m)
- Beam: 24 ft 9 in (7.54 m)
- Draft: 9 ft 4 in (2.84 m)
- Depth of hold: 10 ft (3.0 m)
- Propulsion: 1 × 200 bhp (149 kW) Enterprise DMW-6 diesel engine, one shaft
- Speed: 9 knots (17 km/h; 10 mph)
- Complement: 17
- Armament: 2 × .30 cal (7.62 mm) machine gun

USS Condor (AMc-14) was a coastal minesweeper of the United States Navy. (Note: Naval records of the time refer to Condor as "the U.S.C.G. Condor" instead of USS Condor. Condor was USCG crewed under Navy command during wartime and the vessel was "in service" rather than commissioned for naval service.) The ship was constructed as the wooden-hulled purse seiner New Example at Tacoma, Washington in 1937. Acquired by the U.S. Navy on 28 October 1940, converted into a coastal minesweeper and placed in service on 18 April 1941.

== U.S. Navy career ==
The Coast Guard manned Condor departed for Hawaii 14 May 1941 arriving on 28 May for service in Hawaiian waters. Condor was in Pearl Harbor on the day the attack occurred and is believed to have made the first enemy contact at 0350 and at 0357 notified USS Ward by visual signals of a periscope sighting whereupon Ward began searching for the contact. At about 0637 Ward sighted a periscope apparently tailing USS Antares whereupon she attacked the target, thus firing the first shots of the Pacific War. They later found out that they spotted the periscope of a Japanese midget submarine attempting to get into the harbor. Condor spent the war in or near Hawaii with the U.S. Navy.

Condor was placed out of service at San Diego on 17 January 1946, struck from the List of District Craft in February 1946 and transferred to the Maritime Commission for disposal on 24 July 1946. Her fate is unknown.

== Bibliography ==
- Commander in Chief, Pacific Fleet (15 February 1942). "Pearl Harbor Attack: 7 December 1941, Online Action Reports: Commander in Chief, Pacific Fleet, Serial 0479 of 15 February 1942". Naval History And Heritage Command. Archived from the original on 21 June 2001.
- Historical Section—Public Information Division—U.S. Coast Guard Headquarters (15 March 1946). "Appendix B: Coast Guard Manned Ships Entitled to Operation and Engagement Stars—Asiatic and Pacific Area". The Coast Guard at War. U.S. Coast Guard (digital transcription hosted by HyperWar).
- Naval History And Heritage Command. "Condor". Dictionary of American Naval Fighting Ships. Naval History And Heritage Command. Archived from the original on 25 June 2004.
