= Jerry Fogel =

American actor (1936–2019)

- Born: Jerome Fogel; January 17, 1936; Rochester, New York, U.S.
- Died: October 21, 2019 (aged 83); Kansas City, Missouri, U.S.
- Education: Wesleyan University and United States Military Academy
- Occupation: Actor/Radio Broadcaster

Jerome Fogel (January 17, 1936 – October 21, 2019) was an American actor.

He is best remembered for portraying Jerome "Jerry" Buell on a television situation comedy, The Mothers-in-Law, from 1967 to 1969. Following the cancellation of The Mothers-in-Law, Fogel appeared in the movie Tora! Tora! Tora! and guest starred in various television shows such as The Big Valley, That Girl, Love American Style, Barnaby Jones, Room 222, and Here's Lucy. He hosted an unsold pilot for a kids' game show called The Word Machine in 1973. Fogel had a recurring role in the television series The White Shadow playing the brother of Ken Howard's character, Coach Ken Reeves. After The White Shadow was cancelled, Fogel moved to Kansas City, Missouri where he hosted a local-issues radio show. In 2008 he was diagnosed with Non-Hodgkin lymphoma. He died in Kansas City, Missouri on October 21, 2019.

== Partial filmography ==
Year	Title	Role	Notes
1970	Tora! Tora! Tora!	Lt. Commander William Outerbridge	
1975	The Day of the Locust	Apprentice	
