= USS Ward =

Wickes-class destroyer

Coordinates: 10°51′N 124°33′E

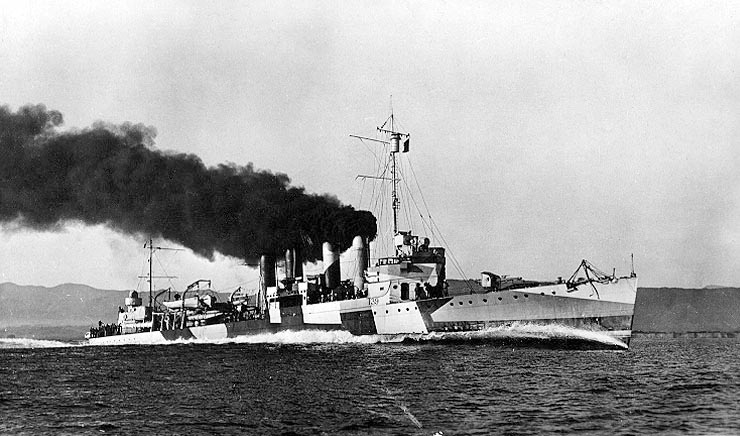
- Ward in dazzle camouflage in 1918 (as DD-139)

History

United States
- Name: Ward
- Namesake: James H. Ward
- Builder: Mare Island Navy Yard
- Laid down: 15 May 1918
- Launched: 1 June 1918
- Commissioned: 24 July 1918
- Decommissioned: 21 July 1921
- Recommissioned: 15 January 1941
- Reclassified: High-speed transport, APD-16, 6 February 1943
- Fate: Sunk by kamikaze 7 December 1944

General characteristics
- Class & type: Wickes-class destroyer
- Displacement: 1,247 long tons (1,267 t)
- Length: 314 ft 4 in (95.8 m)
- Beam: 30 ft 11 in (9.4 m)
- Draft: 9 ft 10 in (3.0 m)
- Propulsion: 2 × geared steam turbines; 2 × shafts
- Speed: 35 knots (65 km/h; 40 mph)
- Complement: 231 officers and enlisted
- Armament: 4 × 4 in (102 mm)/50 cal guns; 2 × 3 in (76 mm)/23 cal anti-aircraft guns; 12 × 21 in (533 mm) torpedo tubes (4x3)

USS Ward was laid down as a 1,247-long-ton (1,267 t) Wickes-class destroyer (designated DD-139) in the United States Navy during World War I, later converted to a high speed transport (designated APD-16) in World War II. She was responsible for the first American-caused casualties in the Pacific in World War II when she engaged and sank a Japanese midget submarine before Japanese aircraft arrived in the attack on Pearl Harbor, killing both crewmen on board.

== Design and construction ==
Ward was named in honor of Commander James Harmon Ward, USN, (1806–1861), the first U.S. Navy officer to be killed in action during the American Civil War. Ward was built at the Mare Island Navy Yard, California in a record of 17½ days. Under the pressure of urgent World War I needs for destroyers, her construction was pushed rapidly from keel laying on 15 May 1918 to launching on 1 June and commissioning on 24 July 1918.

== Service history ==
Ward transferred to the Atlantic late in the year and helped support the trans-Atlantic flight of the Curtiss NC flying boats in May 1919. She came back to the Pacific a few months later, and remained there until she was decommissioned in July 1921. She had received the hull number DD-139 in July 1920.

The outbreak of World War II in Europe brought Ward back into active service. She was recommissioned in January 1941 and assigned for duty with the newly-constituted United States Pacific Fleet, the headquarters and ships of which had been moved from various ports on the West Coast to Naval Station Pearl Harbor amid increasing tensions with the Empire of Japan. Four officers and eighty sailors of the crew were Naval Reservists from the Minnesota Naval Militia's 47th Division, 11th Battalion, chiefly hailing from St. Paul.

=== Pearl Harbor ===
On the morning of 7 December 1941, under the command of LCDR William W. Outerbridge, Ward was conducting a precautionary patrol off the entrance to Pearl Harbor when she was informed at 03:57 by visual signals from the coastal minesweeper Condor of a periscope sighting, whereupon Ward began searching for the contact. At about 06:37, she sighted a periscope apparently tailing the cargo ship Antares whereupon she attacked the target. Though unconfirmed at the time, her guns holed a Japanese Ko-hyoteki-class, two-man midget submarine. The deaths of its two-man crew were the first American-caused casualties in the Pacific Theatre of World War II, occurring a few hours before Japanese carrier aircraft attacked Pearl Harbor. The submarine was attempting to enter the harbor by following Antares through the antisubmarine nets at the harbor entrance. By entering territorial waters of a neutral country without signalling any intent to stop, the submarine was not entitled to "innocent passage" protections and the neutral party had a right to use whatever means to protect its territory. Ward fired several rounds from its main guns, hitting the conning tower of the submarine, and also dropped several depth charges during the attack.

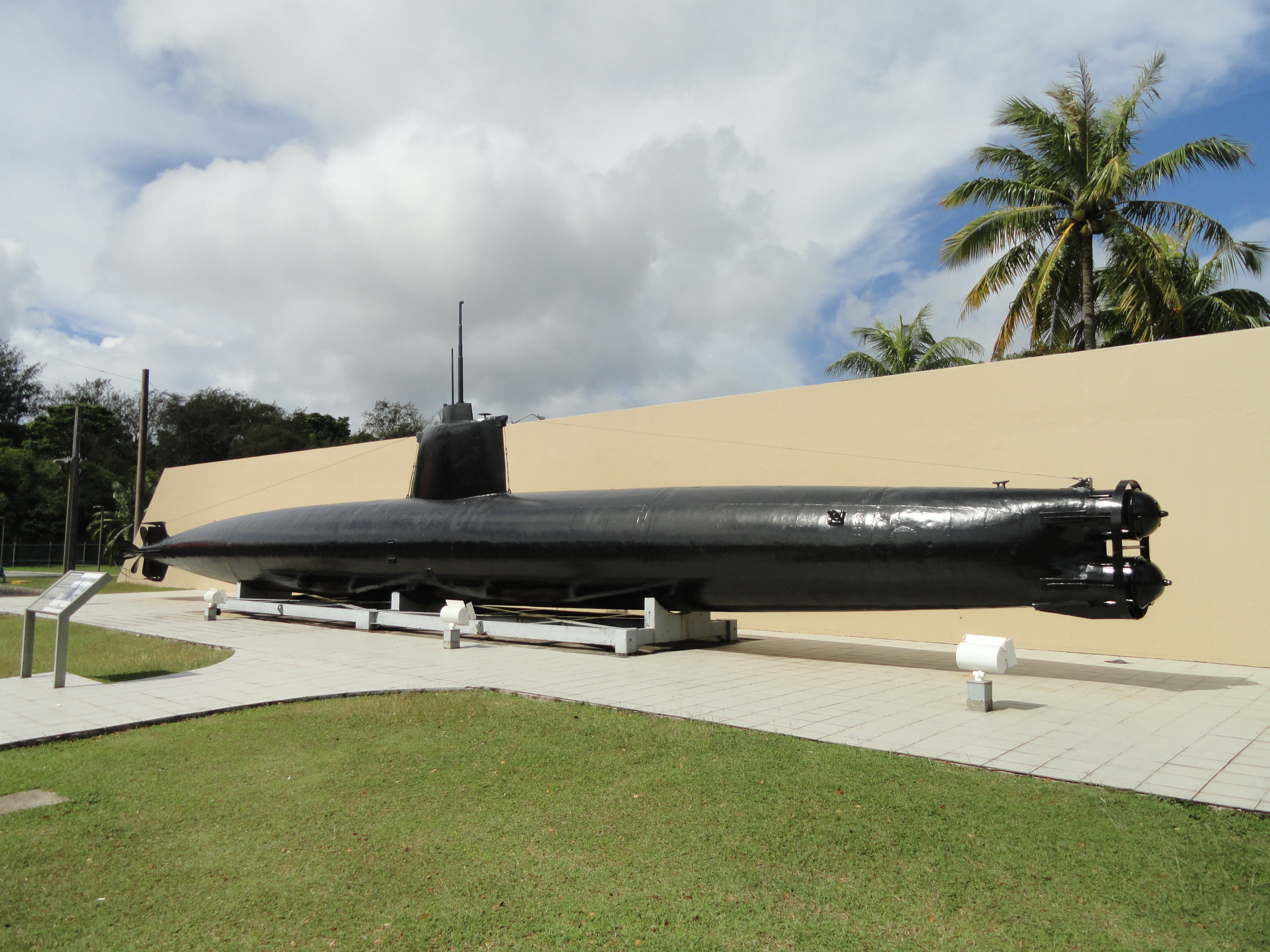
A Ko-hyoteki-class two-man submarine

Debate over whether Ward had really sunk a Japanese midget submarine or had been involved in a simple false alarm persisted for decades until University of Hawaiʻi scientists found the sunken remains of the Japanese vessel on 28 August 2002. The wreck was found in American waters 1,200 ft (366 m) beneath the sea about 3–4 mi (3–3 nmi; 5–6 km) outside Pearl Harbor. The starboard side of the Japanese submarine's conning tower has one shell hole, evidence of damage from Ward's number-three gun. Ward's depth charges did no apparent structural damage to the 46-long-ton (47 t), 78 ft (24 m) craft, which sank due to water flooding in from the shell hole.

=== After Pearl Harbor ===
In 1942, Ward was sent to the West Coast of the United States for conversion to a high-speed transport. Redesignated APD-16 in February 1943, she steamed to the South Pacific to operate in the Solomon Islands area. She helped fight off a heavy Japanese air attack off Tulagi on 7 April 1943, and spent most of the rest of that year on escort and transport service. In December, she participated in the Cape Gloucester invasion. During the first nine months of 1944, Ward continued her escort and patrol work and also took part in several Southwest Pacific amphibious landings, among them the assaults on Saidor, Nissan Island, Emirau, Aitape, Biak, Cape Sansapor, and Morotai.

== Fate ==
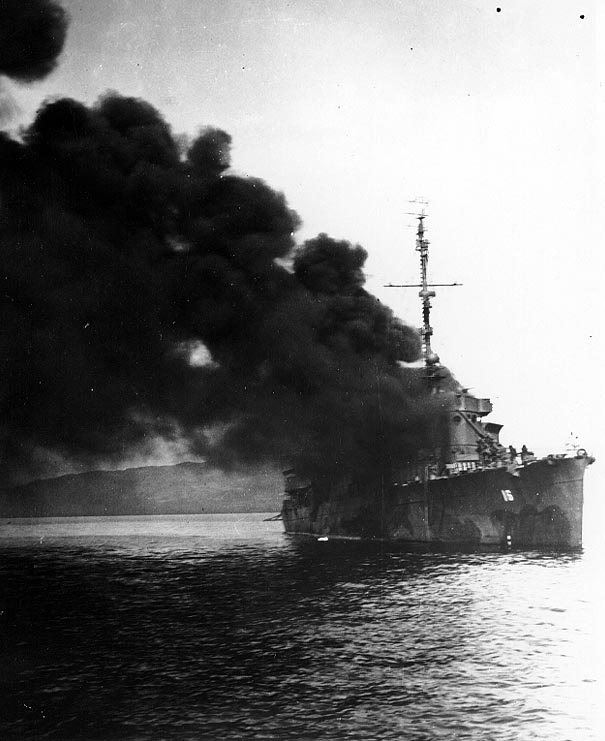
Ward, after being hit by a kamikaze on 7 December 1944. She was sunk by U.S. Navy fire later the same day

As the Pacific War moved closer to Japan, Ward was assigned to assist with operations to recover the Philippine Islands. On 17 October 1944, she put troops ashore on Dinagat Island during the opening phase of the Leyte invasion. After spending the rest of October and November escorting ships to and from Leyte, in early December, Ward transported Army personnel during the landings at Ormoc Bay, Leyte. On the morning of 7 December, three years to the day after she fired the opening shot of the Pearl Harbor attack, she came under attack by several Japanese kamikazes while patrolling off the invasion area. One bomber hit her hull amidships, bringing her to a dead stop. When the resulting fires could not be controlled, Ward's crew was ordered to abandon ship, and she was sunk by gunfire from O'Brien, whose commanding officer, William W. Outerbridge, had been in command of Ward during her action in Hawaii three years before.

In early December 2017, Ward's wreckage was located by RV Petrel in 686 ft (209 m) of water.

In the movie Tora! Tora! Tora!, Ward was portrayed by USS Finch, an Edsall-class destroyer escort.

== Awards ==
- World War I Victory Medal
- American Defense Service Medal with "FLEET" clasp
- Asiatic-Pacific Campaign Medal with nine battle stars
- World War II Victory Medal
- Philippine Liberation Medal with two stars

== Memorial ==
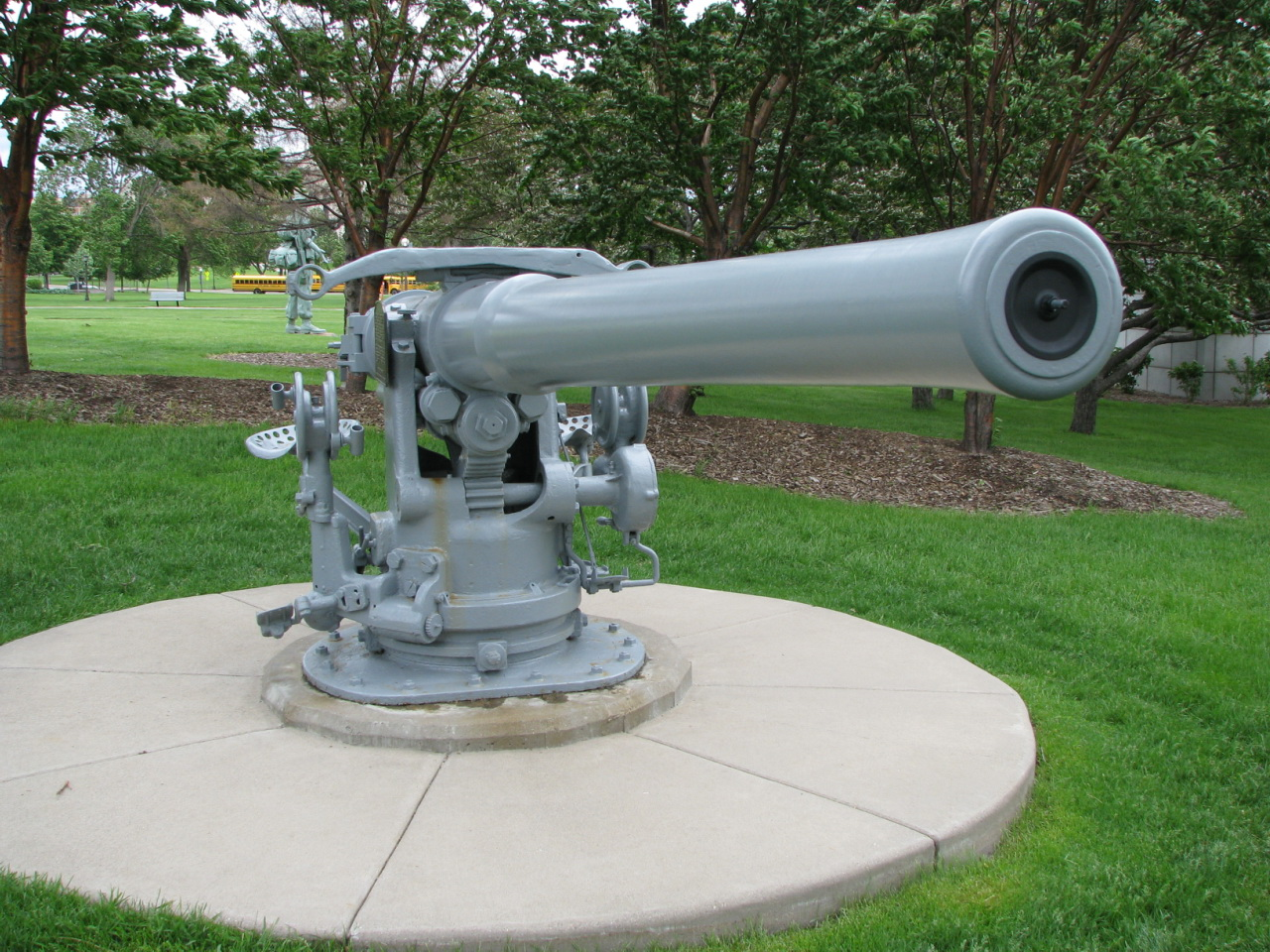
Ward's 4-inch gun at the Minnesota State Capitol

Ward's number-three 4"/50 caliber gun was removed when she was converted to a high speed transport. In 1958, the year of Minnesota's centennial, it was installed as a memorial at the Minnesota State Capitol in St. Paul. as the men who had fired it on 7 December 1941 hailed from the city. A plaque listing the Naval Reservists from St. Paul who served aboard Ward is now displayed in the St. Paul City Hall on the third floor between the council and mayoral offices, in an area also containing the ship's bell from the cruiser Saint Paul. The last surviving member of the gun crew from the morning of 7 December, Alan Sanford, died on January 10, 2015, at the age of 91. In December 2025, the gun was relocated from the state capitol grounds to an indoor exhibit in the new facility of the Minnesota Military and Veterans' Museum, outside Camp Ripley along the east side of Minnesota State Highway 371.

As of 2012, no other ship in the United States Navy has borne this name, although sometimes confusion occurs with the three destroyers named Aaron Ward.
