= The Mothers-in-Law =

American sitcom (1967–1969)

- DVD cover, with Kaye Ballard (left) and Eve Arden
- Genre: Sitcom
- Created by: Bob Carroll, Jr. Madelyn Davis
- Directed by: Desi Arnaz; Elliott Lewis
- Starring: Eve Arden; Kaye Ballard; Herbert Rudley; Roger C. Carmel; Richard Deacon; Jerry Fogel; Deborah Walley
- Theme music composer: Jeff Alexander
- Composers: Jeff Alexander; Wilbur Hatch
- Country of origin: United States
- Original language: English
- No. of seasons: 2
- No. of episodes: 56 (list of episodes)

Production
- Executive producer: Desi Arnaz
- Producers: Al Lewis; Elliott Lewis
- Camera setup: Multi-camera
- Running time: 22–24 minutes
- Production companies: Desi Arnaz Productions; United Artists Television

Original release
- Network: NBC
- Release: September 10, 1967 – April 13, 1969

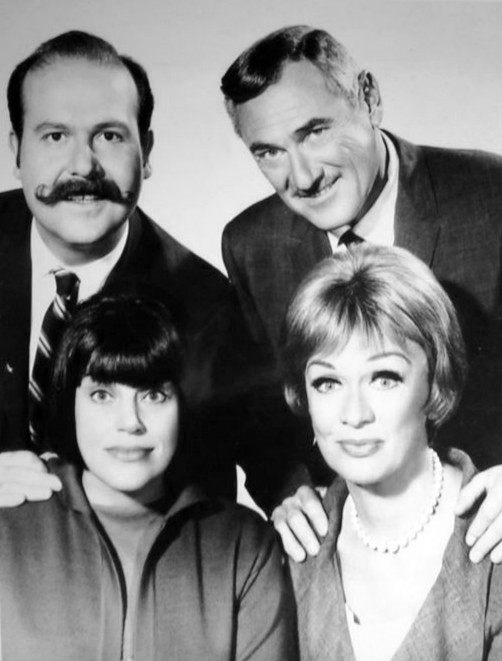
Clockwise from top right: Herbert Rudley, Eve Arden, Kaye Ballard, and Roger C. Carmel

The Mothers-in-Law is an American sitcom starring Eve Arden and Kaye Ballard as two women who were friends and next-door neighbors until their children's elopement made them in-laws. Airing on NBC from September 1967 to April 1969 and executive produced by Desi Arnaz, the series was created by Bob Carroll, Jr., and Madelyn Davis.

== Premise ==
Eve (Eve Arden) and Herb Hubbard (Herbert Rudley) have lived next door to Kaye (Kaye Ballard) and Roger Buell (played first by Roger C. Carmel and later by Richard Deacon) for over 20 years. Herb is a successful lawyer, while Roger is a television writer who works at home. The Hubbards are very straitlaced, while the Buells are off-the-wall and fun-loving. Despite the two couples' differences, including an age disparity of about fifteen to twenty years, they are best friends. In spite of their friendship, though, they do tend to get into more than their share of squabbles.

The Buells' son Jerry (Jerry Fogel) and the Hubbards' daughter Suzie (Deborah Walley) fall in love while in college, marry, and set up house in the Hubbards' garage apartment. The two sets of parents have different ideas of how their children should live their lives, and the constant meddling of the mothers-in-law provides the premise for the series. One of the differences between the two couples is that Kaye allowed Suzie to call her Mother Buell, but Eve forbade Jerry to call her Mother Hubbard, as it was reminiscent of Old Mother Hubbard, the English nursery rhyme. During the second season, the young couple become the parents of fraternal twins, a boy named Joey and a girl named Hildy — from the new grandmas' middle names.

== Episodes ==
Season	Episodes	Originally released	
Season	Episodes	First released	Last released
1	30	September 10, 1967	April 28, 1968
2	26	September 15, 1968	April 13, 1969

== Characters ==
- Eve Arden as Eve Hildegarde Hubbard (née Windsor), homemaker wife of attorney Herb Hubbard and mother of Suzie Hubbard Buell. Her and Kaye's tendency to meddle and interfere with the kids' marriage and lives serves as the show's premise. When she gets annoyed with her husband or her male in-laws, she coldly utters "Beast!" She would also mock sarcastically in a high voice when shown something she finds unbelievable, especially something voiced by Herb or Kaye. The name of her granddaughter Hildy, whom she dotes on and spoils, comes from her middle name.
- Kaye Ballard as Katherine "Kaye" Josephina Buell (née Balotta), wife of Roger Buell and overprotective mother of Jerry Buell. She is known for being less-than-thrilled to be a homemaker, for speaking Italian, and for smacking her husband when she's annoyed with him (smacking his back when they're in bed). She once had a showbusiness career, singing with bands like Ozzie Snick and Charlie Banks and His Ten Tellers. She can be overly emotional; her catch phrases include "Oh, reeeeally?", "Good luck with your MOUTH!", "This, THIS, is the thanks I get!", "Rats!" (usually uttered when she and Eve are thwarted in their schemes), and "Yes, YES, I am!" (Ballard notes that the catchphrases were inspired by her mother and she used them in her performance shows before and after the series’ run). She is affectionately nicknamed "Cookie". The name of her grandson Joey, whom she dotes on and spoils as she does his father, comes from her middle name.
- Herbert Rudley as Herb Hubbard, a successful attorney who gets very exasperated with the wives' constant meddling and interfering with the kids and their marriage. He can be very temperamental in general. When he and Eve argue, they invariably repeat the other's words in anger.
- Roger C. Carmel (season 1) and Richard Deacon (season 2) as Roger C. Buell, a bombastic television scriptwriter who often worked from home. Like Herb, he gets exasperated with the wives' constant interference with the kids. When annoyed with Kaye, he'd call her Katherine and announce "Now you hear this...". He is affectionately nicknamed "Cutes", is sometimes a target of Kaye's wrath, and is known for being a miserly cheapskate.
- Jerry Fogel as Jerome "Jerry" Buell, a college student married to Suzie Hubbard and father of twins Hildy and Joey. Eve didn't think that Jerry was good enough, or financially-stable enough, for Suzie to marry. Although she likes Jerry, she refused to let him call her "Mother Hubbard." He is overly-protected by his doting mother Kaye, who calls him her "darling baby boy". Jerry and Suzie had grown up together and known one another all their lives.
- Deborah Walley as Susan "Suzie" Buell (née Hubbard), a college student married to Jerry and mother of twins Hildy and Joey. Kaye didn't think Suzie was good enough for Jerry to marry, and she wanted him to marry an Italian girl. But she does love Suzie enough to let her call her "Mother Buell." Like her mother, Suzie would utter "Beast!" at her husband when annoyed with him. She could also become overemotional. (Actress Kay Cole portrayed the "Suzie" character in the unaired pilot episode only. In that episode, scenes with Cole were later reshot with Walley.)

Desi Arnaz, who produced and directed the show, appeared in four episodes as a matador named Raphael Delgado y de Acha III, whom the wives had called as a result of a wrong number, and became somewhat of a family friend.

This is one of the rare occasions in which the characters had the same first names as the actors portraying them. In the first season, the notable exception was Deborah Walley who played Suzie. In the second season, Richard Deacon played Roger C. Buell – replacing Roger C. Carmel – and joined Deborah in that distinction.

As well, Kaye Ballard's real name was Catherine Gloria Balotta; the maiden name of the character she played on this show was Katherine Josephina Balotta.

== Production ==
The majority of the episodes were written by series creators Madelyn Davis and Bob Carroll, Jr., who had worked with series producer Desi Arnaz on I Love Lucy. Unlike most sitcoms of the era, The Mothers-in-Law was filmed before a live audience; standard practice at the time was to film an episode on a closed set and add a laugh track during post-production. However, a laugh track was still used to “sweeten” audience reactions or fill in gaps of missed punchlines.

When choosing the two lead roles, executive producer Desi Arnaz approached two longtime friends Eve Arden and Ann Sothern. Both actresses had been friends of Arnaz and his former wife Lucille Ball since the 1930s while working at RKO Pictures and MGM. Arden achieved television stardom in the hit CBS-TV sitcom Our Miss Brooks as high school teacher Connie Brooks from 1952 to 1956 and won an Emmy for Best Actress in a Comedy Series. The show was produced by Desilu. Sothern also had great success on television with her two popular sitcoms Private Secretary (as Susie MacNamara) from 1953 to 1956 and the Desilu-produced The Ann Sothern Show as (Katy O'Connor) from 1958 to 1961. She had also guest starred on the 1957 premiere episode of The Lucy–Desi Comedy Hour entitled "Lucy Takes a Cruise to Havana" (reprising her role of Susie MacNamara) and on seven episodes of The Lucy Show (as the Countess Framboise - née Rosie Harrigan). However, NBC found Sothern and Arden's comedic style too similar and passed on casting Sothern. Singer-comedienne Kaye Ballard, another old friend, auditioned for and got the part of the neighbor, Kaye Buell.

Actress Kay Cole, who would later appear on Broadway in the original cast of A Chorus Line, portrayed the role of Suzie Hubbard in the unaired pilot; however, after the series was picked up, Cole was replaced by actress Deborah Walley who would remain with the series for its entire two-year run. The scenes featuring Cole were re-filmed for the aired version of the pilot, “On Again, Off Again, Lohengrin”, but Cole can be briefly glimpsed in the final shot before the end credits.

== Ratings ==
Despite being sandwiched between Walt Disney's Wonderful World of Color and Bonanza, the show never garnered the ratings NBC had hoped for. The first season ranked 37th with an 18.8 rating and the second season ranked 40th with a 19.4 rating. The network considered canceling the show after the first season, but agreed to renew it for the same price as the first season (after sponsor Procter & Gamble had announced plans to move the series to another network). All cast members agreed to do the second season for the same salary as the first season, except for Carmel, who was replaced with Richard Deacon. The Season 2 ratings were somewhat lower than Season 1, leading to the show's cancellation. On The Doris Day Show Season 4 DVD, Ballard remarked that the network and sponsor wanted The Bill Cosby Show to replace The Mothers-in-Law during the 1969–70 season.

== Home video release ==
MPI Home Video (under license from Desilu, Too (not to be confused with the original Desilu Productions, later Paramount Television, now CBS Studios) released the complete series of The Mothers-in-Law on DVD in Region 1 on July 27, 2010. This release includes a new introduction from Desi Arnaz, Jr., who appeared in two episodes as Tommy, a drum playing friend of Jerry and Suzie Buell; an interview with Kaye Ballard; the original unaired pilot episode (consists of the same footage as the first episode, "On Again, Off Again, Lohengrin," except with Kay Cole as Suzie instead of Deborah Walley; only Suzie's scenes would be reshot for the aired version); original sponsor tags; cast commercials; scripts for unproduced episodes; The Carol Channing Show, a comedy pilot which starred Carol Channing, Jane Dulo and Richard Deacon; and Land's End, a dramatic pilot starring Rory Calhoun. The latter were two failed pilots from Desi Arnaz Productions.

== See also ==
- 1967 in television
- 1968 in television
- 1969 in television
