= USS Antares (AG-10) =

Cargo ship built in 1919

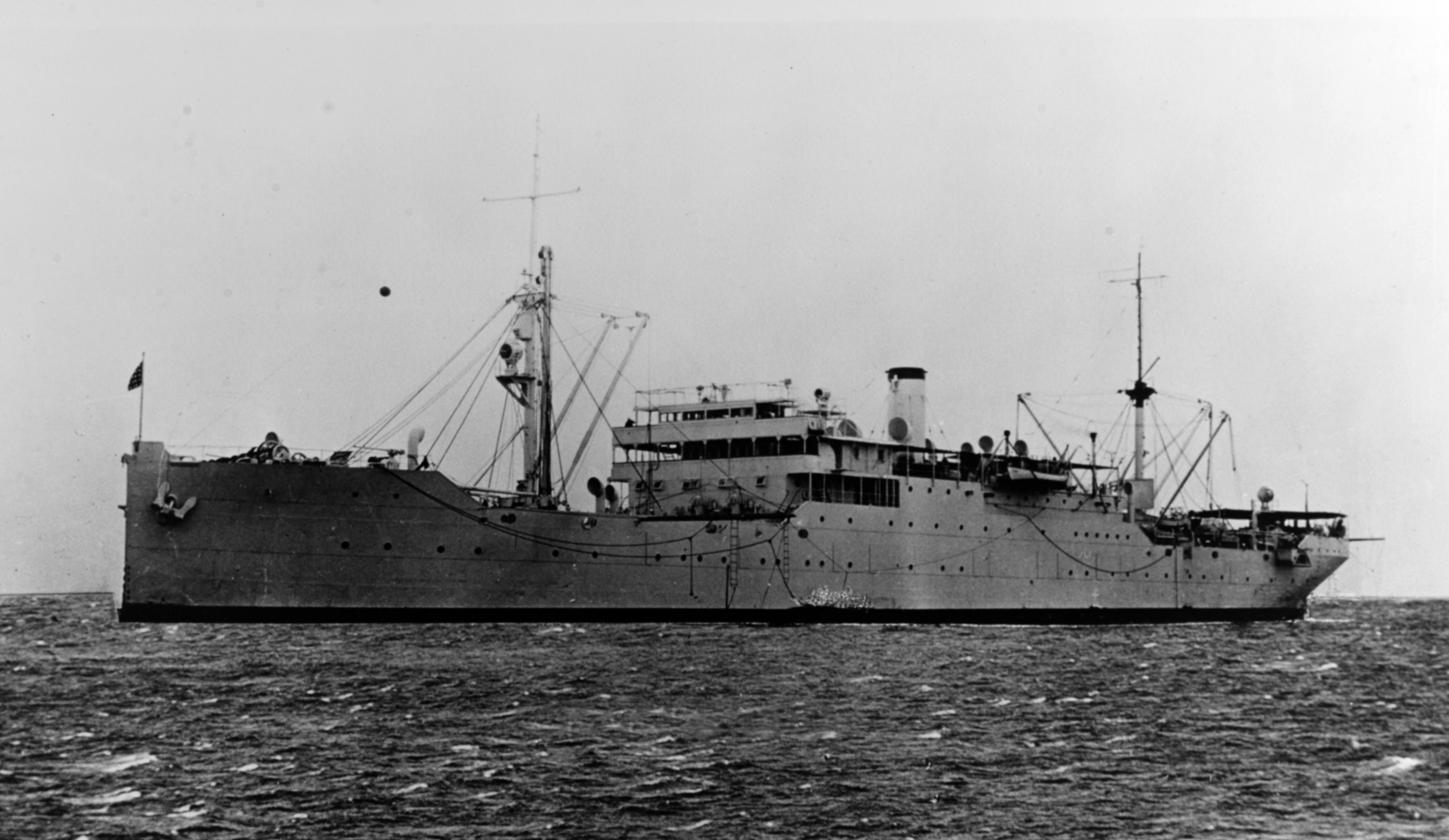
- USS Antares at anchor.

History

United States
- Laid down: 3 July 1918
- Launched: 30 May 1919
- Completed: 26 July 1919
- Acquired: 14 November 1921
- Commissioned: 23 February 1922
- Decommissioned: 2 August 1946
- Stricken: 25 September 1946
- Honors and awards: 2 battle stars
- Fate: Sold for scrapping, 18 September 1947

General characteristics
- Displacement: 11,450 long tons (11,630 t)
- Length: 401 ft (122 m)
- Beam: 54 ft (16 m)
- Draft: 24 ft 5 in (7.44 m)
- Speed: 11.5 kn (13.2 mph; 21.3 km/h)
- Complement: 197
- Armament: 2 × 5 in (130 mm) guns; 4 × 3 in (76 mm) guns; 2 × 6-pounder guns (authorized but not installed at time of commissioning)

USS Antares (AG-10/AKS-3) was an Antares-class cargo ship acquired by the U.S. Navy after World War I for use in transporting cargo. The cargo ship was named after Antares, the brightest star in constellation Scorpius. She earned two battle stars in service during World War II.

== Early career ==
Antares was originally built under Shipping Board contract as the steel-hulled freighter Nedmac, and constructed by the American International Ship Building Corp.; acquired by the Navy on 14 November 1921 under the terms of Executive Order No. 3570 (29 October 1921) which authorized her transfer from the Shipping Board, she was renamed Antares and classified as a "miscellaneous auxiliary", AG-10. She was commissioned at the Philadelphia Navy Yard on 23 February 1922.

After fitting out, Antares joined the Fleet Train, replacing the old auxiliary Nanshan. In March 1923, the ship became flagship for the Train, Scouting Fleet, a squadron of auxiliaries that supported those elements of the Fleet operating along the U.S. East Coast. Though her unit was later administratively incorporated into the Fleet Base Force as Squadron 1, Antares continued to wear the flag of the officer who commanded the auxiliaries on the Atlantic coast. Throughout that period, the ship also served as the fleet target repair and photographic ship, a vital auxiliary to the fleet's gunnery training in the 1920s.

Employed at East Coast ports and operating areas, ranging from the Southern Drill Grounds to the Caribbean, Antares, like other naval vessels, occasionally gathered oceanographic data in the course of her voyages; she re-plotted landmarks for range finder and compass calibration charts, furnishing the Hydrographic Office with data needed to complete the calibration chart of Culebra, Puerto Rico, during the fiscal year 1924. During this time period, Antares participated in fleet concentrations and maneuvers in Cuban waters and in the Panama Canal Zone. Antares brought the planes of Utility Squadron 2 (VJ-2) back to Naval Air Station (NAS), Hampton Roads, following the winter maneuvers in 1925, and for the winter maneuvers of 1926, transported three assembled and one crated plane from VJ-2 to Guantanamo Bay Naval Base, where they towed sleeve targets for the Scouting Fleet's cruisers. Antares then transported VJ-2 to Coco Solo, and from there back to Guantánamo Bay. She again served as an aviation transport that summer, returning to Cuban waters in company with the repair ship Vestal.

From 1 January 1934, Antares served as a supply ship for the Special Service Squadron and, from January to March 1935, as a Mobile Base for the Fleet Marine Force. She then operated in the Caribbean until 1 June 1936 under orders of the Chief of Naval Operations. Placed in reduced commission as of 4 June, Antares served as receiving ship at the Philadelphia Navy Yard.

On May 6, 1937, seven crew members from the USS Antares were dispatched to provide security at the Naval Air Station Lakehurst after the LZ 129 Hindenburg airship disaster.

Placed in full commission on 17 May 1937 at Philadelphia, Pennsylvania, Antares was assigned temporary duty with the Naval Transportation Service (a forerunner of the later Military Sea Transportation Service and the Military Sealift Command), and operated on both east and west coasts. She also operated with the Training Detachment, United States Fleet, and while assigned to this unit participated in Fleet Landing Exercise No. 4 in February 1938. In his report of the evolution, Rear Admiral Alfred Wilkinson Johnson—Commander, Training Detachment—considered that Antares—which had acted as a "utility auxiliary"—had proved "indispensable". He commended her performance of duty, which had been performed in spite of a "crammed schedule, allowing little or no time for upkeep." Antares was the only ship available that could handle the experimental tank lighter, artillery lighter, and other heavy marine equipment. "Her design," Johnson wrote, "except for speed, is ideal for the type of duty performed, and without her services, serious curtailment of the operations would have been necessary."

The planned conversion of the ship to a general stores issue ship caused consternation at Headquarters, Marine Corps, General Thomas Holcomb pleading with the Chief of Naval Operations—Admiral William D. Leahy—to leave Antares in her current configuration, since she had proved so invaluable in the development of equipment and tactics in landing on a hostile shore. Ultimately, however, the conversion was carried out despite the marines' earnest entreaties.

Resuming her work with the Base Force, United States Fleet, from mid-June 1938, Antares operated principally out of San Pedro, California, but later expanded her area of operations to the Hawaiian Islands and changed her base to Pearl Harbor. On 30 November 1940, the ship was reclassified to a general stores issue ship, AKS-3. During 1941, Antares operated between Pearl Harbor and the U.S. West Coast (San Pedro, Mare Island Navy Yard, and San Francisco, California), and Pacific islands such as Palmyra and Canton.

== World War II ==
Antares was provided as transport to the Hawaiian Department, U.S. Army, during the urgent program to develop an air ferry route through the southern Pacific to the Philippines that would avoid the Japanese mandated islands of the central Pacific. On 3 November 1941 she left Oahu for Canton Island with three hundred and eight military (components of the 804th Engineer Battalion) and civilian personnel, supplies and towing a 500-ton barge with 804th Engineer Battalion construction equipment and two small barges that foundered en route.

On 7 December 1941, Antares stood toward the entrance to Pearl Harbor at 06:30 with a 500 long tons (510 t) steel barge in tow, having arrived from Canton and Palmyra and expecting to transfer the barge to a tug and then proceed into Pearl. Not sighting the tug at the appointed time, Antares altered course, turning slowly to the east, when her watch suddenly spotted a suspicious object about 1,500 yd (1,400 m) on the auxiliary's starboard quarter. Antares notified the destroyer Ward, on patrol off the harbor entrance, and the latter altered course toward the object which proved to be a midget submarine. A PBY Catalina from Patrol Squadron 14 showed up almost simultaneously and dropped smoke floats in the vicinity; meanwhile, Ward went to general quarters and attacked, sinking the intruder.

While the report of this incident off the harbor entrance was making its way up the chain of command with glacial slowness, Antares spotted the tug Keosanqua at 07:15. At 07:58, Antares spotted explosions in Pearl Harbor and Japanese planes; two minutes later an enemy aircraft strafed the ship, and soon thereafter, bomb and shell fragments (perhaps American "overs" or unexploded antiaircraft shells) hit the water nearby. As Antares' captain—Captain Lawrence C. Grannis—subsequently reported of events at that point, "As this vessel is not armed, no effective offensive or defensive tactics appeared possible." Passing the tow to Keosanqua at 08:35, Antares zigzagged and turned to a position between the restricted waters of the entrance to Pearl Harbor and the entrance to Honolulu harbor, inshore of the warships beginning to sortie. "As it was apparent that the continued presence of the Antares offshore was placing the ship and personnel in constant jeopardy," Grannis later reported, he requested permission to enter Honolulu. With permission granted at 10:54, Antares stood in and moored at 11:46 to berth 5-A.

Although the work necessary to repair the damaged ships there took precedence, Antares underwent an availability at Pearl Harbor. During this period of alterations, she received her authorized main and secondary battery: two 5 in (130 mm) guns, four 3 in (76 mm) guns and eight 20 mm (0.79 in) anti-aircraft autocannons. Her alterations completed by 27 April 1942, the ship held brief trials and then began loading stores. Then, her holds full, she sailed for Pago Pago, Samoa, on 20 May, arriving 11 days later.

Proceeding thence to Tongatapu, in the Tonga (or Friendly) Islands, soon thereafter, Antares reached her destination on 7 June. She remained there as a general stores issue ship until 1 September, when she shifted to Noumea, New Caledonia. She issued stores to fleet units at Noumea until 5 February 1943, when she sailed to the Fiji Islands and Auckland, New Zealand, ultimately returning to New Caledonia on 7 March. During March 1943, Antares took part in the successful salvaging of Delphinus—which had run aground on Garanhua Reef, off New Caledonia, on the 17th of that month—before being sent to Samoa, and from there to San Francisco, California, where she arrived on 6 May 1943.

Following drydocking and general repairs, Antares returned to Samoa on 10 June, and proceeded from there to Espiritu Santo, arriving there on 18 June. A week later, she sailed for Efate, and thence to New Caledonia, arriving there on 5 July. Ordered back to the United States, Antares reached San Francisco on 1 August and, after reloading supplies and undergoing voyage repairs, again sailed for the South Pacific on 10 September, arriving at her destination, Espiritu Santo, on 4 October. Moving to Tulagi, in the Solomons, a week later, Antares replenished ships there until 24 October, when she returned to Espiritu Santo, and from there set course for the U.S.

Reloading at San Francisco, Antares returned to Efate on New Year's Day 1944, but, eight days later, moved to Espiritu Santo and the Guadalcanal-Tulagi area. Expending her stores there, the ship proceeded from there to Auckland, and thence to the New Hebrides and Solomons, operating and issuing general stores in these areas until January 1945. Assigned then to Ulithi, in the Carolines, Antares arrived there on 10 January and issued stores until returning to Espiritu Santo in late January. She remained there until returning to the Carolines, reaching Ulithi on 11 April.

Ten days later, the ship moved to Guam, and from there to Saipan for further routing to Okinawa to support the ongoing operations there. Antares reached her destination—Kerama Retto—on 10 May, and issued stores in that forward area until she was ordered to Pearl Harbor, via Saipan. Antares sailed alone from Saipan on 25 June 1945, bound for Pearl Harbor. At 13:29 on the 28th, Antares' lookouts reported a periscope and wake 100 yd (91 m) on her starboard quarter. Going to general quarters, the ship increased speed; her captain—Lieutenant Commander N. A. Gansa, USNR—took the conn and maneuvered the ship hard right; the torpedo missed astern, but a close-range battle soon ensued. Simultaneously, lookouts observed what looked like a human-controlled torpedo (kaiten) in the port wake, turning to the right. At 13:31, the ship commenced firing at a periscope wake while she commenced an erratic zig-zag maneuver to avoid the kaiten on the port quarter, close at hand. While Antares' stern swung to starboard, the No. 2 2 in gun, firing down the side of the ship, scored a hit on the kaiten and it disappeared.

Another periscope soon appeared at 13:44; Antares after a 5 in gun opened fire, the concussion dazing the crew of one of the 3 in guns nearby (a severed phone connection had prevented them from getting the word to secure) and ripping open the ready-use boxes for the 3 in guns. Simultaneously, the stores issue ship's call for help was being answered; YMS-468 and the destroyer Sproston closed the scene of the battle to lend a hand. At 14:14, Antares sighted what appeared to be a large submarine commencing to surface; her 5 in gunfire, however, or the timely arrival of help, soon forced what looked like a quick dive. At 1418, Antares' captain ordered "cease fire", but maintained the evasive action he had begun at the outset of the action.

During the action, Antares expended 11 rounds of 5 in, 35 rounds of 3 in, and 130 rounds of 20 mm. She suffered four men wounded when a 20 mm shell hit a splinter shield; seven men suffered broken ear drums from the concussion of the 5 in gun going off directly over the 3 in gun they manned. Postwar records reveal Antares' assailants to be I-36, whose torpedoes missed their target, and the kaiten-carrying I-165, which had departed Hikari on 15 June 1945 for the waters east of the Marianas as part of the "Todoroki" squadron—a special kaiten attack unit. Navy planes flying out of Saipan subsequently sank the latter on 29 June.

Antares brought her eventful voyage to a close at Pearl Harbor on 9 July. She sailed for Ulithi on the 28th, and arrived there on 12 August as the war in the Pacific was coming to a close. Sailing for Okinawa on the 14th, she arrived there on the 19th. The ship subsequently supported the occupation of Korea and China, issuing stores and clothing to forces at Jinsen (now Inchon), Korea; Taku Bay, Weiheiwei and Qingdao, China into the spring of 1946, departing Qingdao on 18 April for Guam. Reaching that port a week later, on 25 April, Antares sailed for the U.S. on 2 May. Ultimately reaching San Francisco, California, late in May, the ship completed discharging her remaining goods and commenced inactivation.

Decommissioned on 2 August 1946 at the Mare Island Naval Shipyard, Antares' name was struck from the Naval Vessel Register on 25 September 1946. On 18 September 1947, she was sold to Kaiser and Co. for scrapping.

== Military awards and honors ==
Antares was awarded two battle stars for her World War II service.
