= USS Aaron Ward =

USS Aaron Ward may refer to the following ships of the United States Navy:

- USS Aaron Ward (DD-132), a destroyer that served between 1919 and 1940 and then became HMS Castleton.
- USS Aaron Ward (DD-483), a destroyer that served between 1942 and her sinking by Japanese bombers in 1943.
- USS Aaron Ward (DM-34), a destroyer minelayer that served in 1944 and 1945.

== See also ==
- USS Ward, named after James Harmon Ward, which fired the first American shot of World War II at the entrance to Pearl Harbor on 7 December 1941.
