= Todoroki =

Todoroki (written: 轟 or 轟木 or 等々力) is a Japanese surname. Notable people with the surname include:

- Kenjiro Todoroki (轟 賢二郎; born 1975), Japanese sailor
- Toshiharu Todoroki (轟木 利治; born 1960), Japanese politician
- Yu Todoroki (轟 悠), Japanese actress
- Yukiko Todoroki (轟 夕起子; 1917–1967), Japanese actress
- Todoroki Buhē (轟 武兵衛; 1818–1873), Japanese swordsman and kokugakusha
- Todoroki Hajime (轟はじめ), Japanese VTuber

== Fictional characters ==
- Enji Todoroki (轟 炎司), a character in the manga series My Hero Academia also known as Endeavor
- Kakeru Todoroki (轟 駆流), protagonist of the anime series Chō Soku Henkei Gyrozetter
- Licht Jekylland Todoroki (リヒト・ジキルランド・轟), a character in the manga series Servamp
- Raichi Todoroki (轟 雷市), a character in the manga series Ace of Diamond
- Shoto Todoroki (轟 焦凍), a character in the manga series My Hero Academia
- Shu Todoroki, a character in the film Cars 2
- Yachiyo Todoroki (轟 八千代), a character in the manga series Working!!
- Takaya Todoroki (轟鷹也) - From the Anime Arrow Emblem: Hawk of the Grand Prix (アローエンブレム・グランプリの鷹)

== See also ==
- Todoroki Station (disambiguation), multiple railway stations in Japan
