= List of The Mothers-in-Law episodes =

This is a list of episodes for the television series The Mothers-in-Law.

== Series overview ==
Season	Episodes	Originally released	
Season	Episodes	First released	Last released
1	30	September 10, 1967	April 28, 1968
2	26	September 15, 1968	April 13, 1969

== Episodes ==
=== Season 1 (1967–68) ===
No. overall	No. in season	Title	Directed by	Written by	Original release date
1	1	"On Again, Off Again, Lohengrin"	Desi Arnaz	Bob Carroll Jr. & Madelyn Davis	September 10, 1967
Kaye and Roger Buell come over to Eve and Herb Hubbard's home to watch one of Roger's TV scripts on their color TV. Kaye and Roger insult Eve and Herb, who are hiding in their closet and overhear everything. The two couples begin to quarrel with one another. To further complicate matters, their children, Jerry Buell and Suzie Hubbard, get engaged. The families then argue about the size of the wedding and how to bring in the Buells' piano during a rain storm. The piano, which Kaye is obsessively protective of, falls into an adjacent neighbor's swimming pool. To top it all off, Jerry and Suzie announce that their engaged friends, the Beesmeyers, wanted to make it a double wedding, so they got married as well. (Note: The episode's title refers to the literary character Lohengrin, a knight sent to rescue a maiden.)
2	2	"Everybody Goes on a Honeymoon"	Desi Arnaz	Bob Carroll Jr. & Madelyn Davis	September 17, 1967
The Hubbards and the Buells meet by chance at the same golf resort, much to the couples' mutual dismay, as both Kaye and Eve are still upset about their children getting married. When Jerry and Suzie arrive at the same venue to begin their honeymoon (after their previous honeymoon venue proved to be cold and rainy), the families think it would help to give the kids one of the rooms. As a result, the parents wind up rooming together and adding two roll-away beds. Chaos ensues as the close quarters prove unnerving to the couples and an unruly motorcycle gang loudly parties right by their window during the night.
3	3	"All Fall Down"	Desi Arnaz	Allan Manings & Hugh Wedlock Jr.	September 24, 1967
While Kaye and Roger are on a ski trip with the kids, she breaks her ankle by slipping on a throw rug at the ski lodge. During this episode, Kaye uses her real-life trademark line, "Good luck, with your MOUTH!" as a retort toward Roger revealing the real reason of what happened. The Buells convince a reluctant Herb to serve as their lawyer and sue the ski lodge on their behalf. This agreement leads to Eve breaking her ankle in a reenactment of the accident and then to Herb breaking his ankle when he visits the ski lodge to negotiate a settlement. The action culminates in Roger breaking his hand when he tries to slug the cowardly ski lodge manager. (Note: The episode's title refers to the final line of a well-known nursery rhyme, "Ring Around the Rosie".)
4	4	"A Night to Forget"	Maury Thompson	Bob Carroll Jr. & Madelyn Davis	October 1, 1967
The husbands forbid Kaye and Eve from constantly interrupting the kids' honeymoon with their unnecessary and repeated telephone calls. While in a local department store, Young and Robbins, the wives notice public telephones and seize the opportunity to circumvent their husbands' restrictions and to once again call the kids. The call goes on for such a long time that the store closes and the two women find themselves locked in after hours. After much distress, they realize they can call their husbands to come rescue them. Using Kaye's last dime, Eve dials a wrong number and connects with bullfighter Raphael Del Gado (Desi Arnaz) in Barcelona, Spain. With a combination of Eve's high school Spanish and Raphael's bad English, they manage to convince him to call their husbands back in Los Angeles. When they are later found by Roger and Herb, the two couples are arrested and jailed for being in the store after hours. (Note: The episode's title refers to the 1958 film A Night to Remember, about the sinking of the Titanic.)
5	5	"The Newlyweds Move In"	Desi Arnaz	Bob Carroll Jr. & Madelyn Davis	October 8, 1967
Eve and Kaye go and get the deposit back on the apartment that the kids had found, and convince the husbands, who are furious at what the wives did, to allow them to move into the Hubbards' garage apartment (at first, Herb and Roger were not thrilled with the idea, because they were too close for the mothers to interfere, but when it was revealed that the kids could save money, the husbands agreed). Kaye and Eve sneak into the apartment to meddle, and they end up hiding in the newlyweds' shower when they are caught by the kids. Jerry and Suzie then have their first dinner party with their friends, fellow married couples Paul and Cynthia and Peggy and John, which the parents are not invited to. The indefatigable wives peer through the windows and are trapped on the garage door when it is opened. The husbands catch them and once again, "Eve and Kaye made fools of themselves!!!"
6	6	"The Career Girls"	Desi Arnaz	Fred S. Fox & Seaman Jacobs	October 15, 1967
The wives are told to find something to do to prevent them from always interfering with the kids, so they become a singing duo, "The Marvys," which the family goes to see and are actually impressed with. Rob Reiner (later Mike Stivic of All in the Family fame) plays the club's director, who is at first amused by Eve and Kaye, but concedes to allow them in the show, which closes soon after.
7	7	"Who's Afraid of Elizabeth Taylor?"	Desi Arnaz	Bob Carroll Jr. & Madelyn Davis	October 22, 1967
After a movie date, the Buells get into a heated argument about whether Roger would date Elizabeth Taylor, and Kaye furiously throws him out of the house; Herb and Eve also get into an argument over the same subject, and Eve storms over to Kaye's house. The couples eventually reunite after the boys stage a fight and the girls feign being poisoned. To cause more confusion, Suzie and Jerry get into a similar argument about Ann-Margret!
8	8	"My Son, the Actor"	Desi Arnaz	Bob Carroll Jr., Madelyn Davis & Peggy Elliott	October 29, 1967
Jerry takes an aptitude test and finds that he is good as an actor. Kaye, at first disappointed of losing the chance of Jerry becoming a doctor, and her having been in show business, is rather keen on the idea, but Eve, upset that he will not be a lawyer, bursts into tears at the suggestion. However, they both come to terms with it, and then all six perform a musical sketch called Marvin against the Mob, written by Roger, about life in the Roaring '20s. Kaye, Eve and Suzie play flappers; Jerry, Herb and Roger play mobsters. Despite the successful audition, Jerry doesn't choose Theater as a major, but Political Science.
9	9	"How Do You Moonlight a Meatball?"	Desi Arnaz	Fred S. Fox & Seaman Jacobs	November 5, 1967
A despondent Jerry loses his job at the University Bookstore with one more payment to make on Suzie's engagement ring. The wives want to help, but the husbands put a stop to it by cutting off their money and credit cards while they go hunting. In retaliation for that, they pawn Herb and Roger's golf clubs. They use the money to start a catering business, specializing in Kaye's spaghetti and meatballs, out of the kids' apartment. While making meatballs, Suzie's engagement ring is thought to be lost in the hamburger mix, so the wives try to take their meatballs from a big University function. It was recovered, after she discovered that she had left it on the window ledge, and when the husbands return from a fruitless hunting trip, they get a welcome of meatballs and spaghetti sauce dumped on top of them.
10	10	"I Thought He'd Never Leave"	Elliott Lewis	Ronald Axe & Sydney Zelinka	November 12, 1967
Eve is forbidden to order any more magazines by Herb, but that argument is made insignificant when a poetry-reciting bank robber (Larry Storch) barges into the Hubbards home and holds the parents hostage. Thanks to Suzie and Jerry's getting the message to call the police in a chocolate cake, the robber is apprehended, but not before Roger gets knocked on the head.
11	11	"The Great Bicycle Race"	Elliott Lewis	Bob Carroll Jr. & Madelyn Davis	November 19, 1967
The couples realize that they are out of shape, so they join a bicycle club that the kids belong to, which becomes yet another attempt between the Buells and Hubbards to outdo each other.
12	12	"Through the Lurking Glass"	Desi Arnaz	Bob Carroll Jr., Madelyn Davis & Howard Ostroff	November 26, 1967
Kaye, Eve and the kids have plans to attend a children's hospital function, with the wives dressing as insects, a very annoyed Jerry dressed as a kangaroo, and Suzie as an owl. Kaye thinks Roger is having an affair...with Eve, because she spies on him as he takes a walk. Then to make matters worse, on one of his walks, Roger, dressed in a superhero outfit, ends up in jail on loitering charges. Everyone, dressed in costume, comes to try to get matters straightened out, which drives the desk sergeant (Alan Reed) near crazy. (Note: The title was a parody of the book title, Through the Looking Glass.)
13	13	"Divorce: Mother-in-Law Style"	Elliott Lewis	Bill Idelson & Harvey Miller	December 3, 1967
Eve receives a phone call from Carter Case (Roger Ewing), a wealthy former boyfriend of Suzie's, and conveniently fails to tell him that she had married Jerry. This angers Kaye, who tells Eve they are no longer speaking. Herb is also annoyed with Eve for failing to tell Carter that Suzie was now married. Kaye demands a divorce and then retaliates by untruthfully telling Jerry's former girlfriend, Anna Maria DiBello (Adrienne Hayes), that he was no longer married to Suzie. The irate newlyweds (with the help of their fathers and Carter) decide that it is time that their interfering mothers are taught a hard lesson. The kids decide to play a gag on Kaye and Eve by announcing they were divorcing and remarrying (Jerry to Anna Maria, Suzie to Carter). The wives, in an attempt to get the kids back together, sabotage Carter's boat engine with sugar. To pay for the damage they caused to Carter's yacht, the wives lose their clothing allowance for two years plus a trip to Hawaii.
14	14	"The Not-Cold-Enough War"	Desi Arnaz	Bill O'Hallaren	December 10, 1967
The Buell's refrigerator has no freezer and does not keep anything cold. As if that weren't bad enough, they are entertaining a television star who is coming to dinner to talk over a script that Roger wants to sell to him. Jerry and Suzie have only a small refrigerator, which they are lending to their friends John and Cynthia, while the Hubbards get a new refrigerator from a client as barter for a case. Kaye and Roger attempt to steal the Hubbards' new refrigerator after the old one they were given by Eve and Herb breaks down. This causes the in-laws to engage in more bickering and utter confusion when the police are brought into the insanity.
15	15	"You Challenge Me to a What?"	Desi Arnaz	Bob Carroll Jr. & Madelyn Davis	December 17, 1967
It's another round in the Hubbards vs. Buells feud. During a barbecue at the Hubbards, Roger's script for Eve's garden club gets insulted by both Eve and Suzie. Roger, furious at this insult, plays on his script's Three Musketeers theme and demands satisfaction by challenging Herb to a duel, and even wrangling Jerry and Suzie as their seconds. Both wives are concerned (with Kaye threatening Roger with "I'll KILL YOU!!!!" if he hurt Jerry!). It is up to Kaye and Eve to stop their headstrong husbands from dueling.
16	16	"Everybody Wants to Be a Writer"	Desi Arnaz & Elliott Lewis	Bill O'Hallaren	December 31, 1967
Eve and Kaye want to learn how to write stories as yet another diversion to get them away from bothering the children and their marriage, so they enlist Roger's help. He declines at first, but ultimately decides to help. He savages their first attempt at writing, to the wives' fury, but their second script was very well done (unknown that they committed forgery). The wives attempt to get the forged script back from Terrence Archibald, a writer that Roger knew, and both of them wind up playing singing extras (singing "Because," of course) on their favorite soap opera.
17	17	"The Kids Move Out"	Elliott Lewis	Bob Carroll Jr. & Madelyn Davis	January 7, 1968
Fed up with their mothers' continual (and often unwanted) interference, Jerry and Suzie move out of the garage apartment and into a ramshackle apartment which was sublet by friends of theirs. Later on, the two relent their rash decision and move back "home". One of the big features was a borrowed big wardrobe, in which all four of the parents hide and are taken clear across town.
18	18	"The Hombre Who Came to Dinner: Part 1"	Desi Arnaz & Elliott Lewis	Bob Carroll Jr. & Madelyn Davis	January 14, 1968
Raphael Del Gado, the bullfighter from Barcelona whom Eve had called by mistake, and who was known for never having been gored by a bull, comes to Los Angeles to meet the rest of the families. After being humiliated and injured by Roger, who ends his no-gore streak by goring him with a pair of Viking horns, Raphael stays at the Hubbards to recuperate.
19	19	"The Hombre Who Came to Dinner: Part 2"	Desi Arnaz & Elliott Lewis	Bob Carroll Jr. & Madelyn Davis	January 21, 1968
Jerry and Suzie's drum-playing friend Tommy (Desi Arnaz, Jr.) meets the Hubbards' houseguest Senor Raphael Del Gado, who puts him and the families into a big musical number in Mexico City.
20	20	"Don't Give Up the Sloop"	Elliott Lewis	Bill Idelson & Harvey Miller	January 28, 1968
Kaye wins a sloop on a game show, which provokes another fight between her and Eve which the husbands get dragged in on. After finally agreeing to share the boat on alternate weekends, and arguing about who would be captain, they all discover that the ship requires assembly. The husbands think that the project will help bond their families, but Eve does not believe it will happen and says, "I Christen thee, the Fat Chance!"
21	21	"I'd Tell You I Love You, But We're Not Speaking"	Desi Arnaz	Robert Daniel & Mark Howard	February 4, 1968
Suzie and Jerry wind up having their first major quarrel about whether either Eve or Kaye was most interfering, which leads to all three couples engaging in a cold war. Professor Hutton (Brooks West, Eve Arden's real-life husband), Jerry's Psychology professor, comes over to hold a sensitivity training session which reunites everyone.
22	22	"Herb's Little Helpers"	Elliott Lewis	Bob Carroll Jr. & Madelyn Davis	February 11, 1968
Herb's partner's secretary, Elaine, gets the flu (his own secretary also has the flu), allowing Eve and an untried Kaye to take her place. They also secretly help a young couple marry, by singing "Because", the song they would have sung at their own children's wedding. Unfortunately, the bride is the daughter of Herb's client Mr. Hedgyes (Jerome Cowan), who is at first dead set against his daughter marrying, but after being unable to find an argument forbidding it, allows it to occur.
23	23	"Bye, Bye Blackmailer"	Elliott Lewis	Bob Carroll Jr. & Madelyn Davis	February 25, 1968
Roger owes Herb money, and Herb, not wanting to give him another extension, forecloses on his new electric typewriter. When Roger pays him $100, what he owes on the typewriter, Herb is stunned, and then realizes that his emergency fund was broken into by Eve. Eve and Kaye come up with some elaborate (and phony) blackmail to throw the husbands off the trail, but their duplicity is exposed in the end.
24	24	"The Wig Story"	Desi Arnaz	Michael Morris	March 3, 1968
After borrowing Eve's blonde wig and driving Roger wild with it, Kaye fears Roger would rather be in love with a blonde and not her, making her depressed. When Herb and Eve try to help the Buells, with Eve dressing in a red wig, a la Lucy, the situation brings Kaye and Roger back together, but causes Eve and Herb to have the same argument.
25	25	"It's Only Money"	Elliott Lewis	Sydney Zelinka	March 10, 1968
Herb becomes annoyed with Roger's splitting the dinner check right down the middle all the time, so he challenges Buell to golf and gin, and loses big time. Desperate to get some revenge on Roger, he buys some stock from him, only to lose on that too!
26	26	"I Haven't Got a Secret"	Desi Arnaz	Peggy Chantler Dick	March 17, 1968
Kaye tries to prove that she is not a blabbermouth, but fails when she blabs about Roger's proposed television soap opera deal to Eve, who shares it with everyone. Sure enough, the deal falls through because "she jinxed it when she blabbed!" (Note: The title is a play on the long-running television game show, I've Got a Secret)
27	27	"Jerry's Night Out with the Boys"	Desi Arnaz & Elliott Lewis	Bob Carroll Jr. & Madelyn Davis	March 24, 1968
Jerry wants to play poker with the guys, but Suzie believes that he should want to spend all his time with her. So Suzie puts her foot down to Jerry and orders him to cancel his poker night. Egged on by the fathers, Jerry has his poker night anyway, so Suzie and the mothers decide to get a poker night together themselves. However, nobody has any fun, especially when Jerry is thinking of Suzie and vice versa.
28	28	"The Long, Long Weekend"	Elliott Lewis	Bob Carroll Jr. & Madelyn Davis	March 31, 1968
The families congregate at a rented cabin in the mountains, after telling the others that they would not be there, and immediately everyone begins to get on one another's nerves. A snowstorm which closes the road only makes things worse, and when they shoot a hole through the roof, they cause an avalanche to snow over the just cleared road.
29	29	"Jealousy Makes the Heart Grow Fonder"	Elliott Lewis	Bob Carroll Jr. & Madelyn Davis	April 7, 1968
Eve becomes jealous of Herb's old girlfriend Audrey Fleming, who is visiting them. Kaye and Roger help Eve pretend that she has a new lover...in Roger, disguised as her French teacher. (Note: The title is a play on the old adage "Absence makes the heart grow fonder.")
30	30	"How Not to Manage a Rock Group"	Desi Arnaz	Don Nelson	April 28, 1968
Jerry and Suzie manage a band called the Warts (played by The Seeds) and convince their parents to help back them. The parents meddle in everything and nearly ruin the deal, but the Generation Gap was spanned, with the aid of a Salvation Army-esque band, and the Warts accompany the band to play "Some Enchanted Evening." Joe Besser guests as the leader of the Salvation Army-esque band who helps everyone. This was the final episode with Roger C. Carmel as Roger Buell.

=== Season 2 (1968–69) ===
No. overall	No. in season	Title	Directed by	Written by	Original release date
31	1	"Here Comes the Bride, Again"	Desi Arnaz	Bob Carroll Jr. & Madelyn Davis	September 15, 1968
Jerry's great grandmother Gabriela Balotta (Jeanette Nolan) from Italy, known for fainting when she does not get her own way, comes to town to see Jerry and Suzie get married (remarried), which gives Herb reason, although reluctantly, to throw a wedding at the Hubbard's home. This also finally allows Kaye and Eve to sing their song, "Because" for the kids, although this time, they, along with Grandma Balotta, sing it in Italian. Jerry and Suzie then discover that they are going to be parents. First episode with Richard Deacon as Roger.
32	2	"The Match Game"	Elliott Lewis	Bob Carroll Jr. & Madelyn Davis	September 22, 1968
Jerry's job at a match maker agency, which is in jeopardy due to lack of people needing to be matched up, brings the families into more trouble when the girls are matched with the other's spouses! Paul Lynde guests as Jerry's boss.
33	3	"A Little Pregnancy Goes a Long Way"	Elliott Lewis	Bob Carroll Jr. & Madelyn Davis	September 29, 1968
Kaye and Eve once again try to interfere with Suzie and her pregnancy; plying her with stories about their cravings and queasiness (which Suzie herself picks up on, not to mention her emotional outbursts). The wives also begin to argue about what sex the baby would be (Kaye wants a grandson; while Eve wants a granddaughter). This causes Jerry to explain the situation to the fathers, who put their foot down to the wives once again in an attempt to stop their constant interfering with Suzie and her pregnancy. When their neighbors, the Cornells go on a cruise to Hawaii with the Trumbulls, another set of neighbors, Kaye and Eve think the husbands (who really want to take them to a cabin called Ho-No-Lulu, which is owned by their friend, Homer) are going to do the same thing, but once again the wives are caught in a web of their own devising. They are allowed to go on the cruise, only on the condition that they stop interfering in Jerry and Suzie's lives, but they refuse to do so.
34	4	"Love Thy Neighbor... if You Can't Make Them Move"	Elliott Lewis	Fred S. Fox & Seaman Jacobs	October 6, 1968
Eve and Herb remember, via flashback, the first time that they met Kaye and Roger almost 15 years previously, and how the stage was set for their current interactions. Kaye and Roger drive Eve and Herb near crazy with their incessant borrowing; and Herb and Eve insult Kaye's heritage and Roger's writing. However, at the end, Jerry and Suzie mention that no matter what had happened, the two of them would have found their way to one another.
35	5	"I Didn't Raise Myself to Be a Grandmother"	Elliott Lewis	Bob Carroll Jr. & Madelyn Davis	October 13, 1968
Kaye and Eve set off Suzie into another bout of tears with their being overbearing about the baby's names, which upsets Jerry, Herb and Roger. After their argument, the couples are faced with the realization that they will be grandparents. At their annual talent show, the parents do a wonderful rendition of "You Make Me Feel So Young", with their heads in a backdrop with puppet bodies.
36	6	"Even Mothers-in-Law Have Mothers-in-Law"	Elliott Lewis	Fred S. Fox & Seaman Jacobs	October 20, 1968
Jerry and Suzie, after more unwanted interference from their mothers, are fed up enough to call in their paternal grandmothers to help them keep busy and to leave them in peace. Eve and Kaye, unhappy that their mothers-in-law are visiting and keeping them away from interfering with Jerry and Suzie, try to make the best of it showing their in-laws the sights of Los Angeles, but they scheme to bring their garden club band in to drive them out. After their in-laws leave, Kaye and Eve go right back over to the kids' apartment, as usual.
37	7	"The Matador Makes a Movie"	Desi Arnaz	Bob Carroll Jr. & Madelyn Davis	October 27, 1968
In Desi Arnaz's last appearance as Raphael Del Gado, the matador comes to town to make a movie called The Sheik of Araby, and the families are hired into the movie.
38	8	"It's a Dog's Life"	Elliott Lewis	Bob Fisher & Arthur Marx	November 10, 1968
Both Eve and Kaye deny the fact that they need glasses after they continually crash the family cars; whilst Jerry and Suzie decide to choose a dog that they can raise with the baby. The newlyweds wanted a cocker spaniel, but, once again, the mothers interfere and Eve gets a Yorkie named Ellsworth and Kaye gets a basset named Lasagna. John Byner guests as an animal control officer.
39	9	"The First Anniversary Is the Hardest"	Desi Arnaz	Bob Carroll Jr. & Madelyn Davis	November 24, 1968
Jerry is depressed that he cannot get Suzie a first anniversary gift, so the parents, unbeknownst to one another, help him out with forty dollars, hidden in an old coat of his; but Suzie gives it to a thrift shop (after getting the money out for Jerry, of course) and Kaye and Eve wind up getting arrested after trying to pick the pocket of a bum who got the coat!
40	10	"The Birth of Everything But the Blues"	Elliott Lewis	Elaine Di Bello Bradish	December 1, 1968
Suzie becomes a pet sitter to earn some extra money to buy a crib, but after bringing in too much business, the girls are hauled into the business for themselves. Complications arise when the pets themselves all give birth.
41	11	"Nome, Schnome, I'd Rather Have It at Home"	Desi Arnaz	Henry Garson	December 8, 1968
The husbands both find jobs for a jobless Jerry, but Jerry has a friend who gets him a job at an air freight agency. The trouble is that the job is in Nome, Alaska, to the mothers' dismay, and both Kaye and Eve have nightmares of their children living in an igloo near Nome.
42	12	"Hail, Hail, the Gang's Still Here"	Elliott Lewis	Bob Carroll Jr. & Madelyn Davis	December 15, 1968
When Roger's scripts for the (fictitious) soap opera "Green Valley, USA" are shown on TV, everyone in the neighborhood descends on the Hubbards to watch it on their color TV set, which infuriates the Hubbards.
43	13	"Didn't You Use to Be Ozzie Snick?"	Desi Arnaz	Fred S. Fox & Seaman Jacobs	December 22, 1968
Herb invites Owen Sinclair, a former band leader to do a variety show, and it shocks Kaye to discover that he is Ozzie Snick, whom she had sung with, for all of ten days. Ozzie Nelson guest stars as Ozzie Snick, and Kaye and Eve sing his song, "North Dakota Moon".
44	14	"Make Room for Baby"	Elliott Lewis	Bob Carroll Jr. & Madelyn Davis	January 5, 1969
The couples try to build a room onto the garage apartment for the baby which they eventually do, despite all the arguing the couples do.
45	15	"Haven't You Had That Baby Yet?"	Elliott Lewis	Bob Carroll Jr. & Madelyn Davis	January 12, 1969
The Buells finally graduate from college, and at the same time, Suzie goes into labor and prepares to give birth to her child. During the confusion, in which the mothers would be taking her to the hospital, they run out of gas in the car. Dr. Butler, Suzie's OB/GYN comes to check on her, and drives her to the hospital himself.
46	16	"And Baby Makes Four"	Elliott Lewis	Bob Carroll Jr. & Madelyn Davis	January 19, 1969
Suzie gives birth to fraternal twins, Joey (after Kaye's middle name) and Hildy (after Eve's middle name) which gives the wives what each one wanted: a grandson for Kaye to spoil and a granddaughter for Eve to spoil. But not before the wives try everything humanly possible, even going so far as to disguising themselves as two nuns and two doctors, to see her. Alice Ghostley guests as the harried maternity nurse, Mrs. Irene Wiley, who is charged with the unenviable task of keeping Kaye and Eve out of Suzie's room.
47	17	"Nanny, Go Home"	Elliott Lewis	Elaine Di Bello Bradish	January 26, 1969
A Scottish nanny named Annie MacTaggart (Jeanette Nolan in her second guest starring role), who was hired by the husbands to keep Kaye and Eve from their continual butting-in, does her job well...perhaps a bit too well. She keeps everyone away from the newborns, including Jerry and Suzie. The families scheme to get her to go back to Scotland, by staging something for a made-up show, and then, fortuitously, a real show is set up for her to work in, which allows the grandmothers to dote on their grandchildren.
48	18	"Double Trouble in the Nursery"	Elliott Lewis	Bruce Howard	February 2, 1969
After convincing a worn-out Jerry and Suzie to take a weekend vacation, the parents decide to take care of the twins, which also sparks an argument of whether the husbands or the wives could take care of the twins better, especially when the husbands are getting ignored by the wives.
49	19	"Void Where Prohibited by In-Laws"	Elliott Lewis	Skip Webster	February 9, 1969
The couples argue about where the twins could end up going to college, and then they also begin to argue about the costs. Jerry informs the mothers to stay out of it, since he and Suzie are the ones who will help the twins with their college education when it comes to that time. Of course, Kaye and Eve choose not to listen and enter a contest to count the pieces in a box of Blimpo cereal. While doing that, the wives fix the plumbing and do some painting, while their husbands go golfing! In the end, disaster ensues, when all they win for their pains is a lifetime supply of Blimpo (the grand prize went to two little old ladies who used a Ouija board to get the right total)!
50	20	"Guess Who's Coming Forever"	Elliott Lewis	Bob Fisher & Arthur Marx	February 23, 1969
When the kids threaten to move out again after more unwanted interference by their mothers, Kaye and Eve call their bluff, by putting the place up for rent, with an African American lawyer (Scoey Mitchell) very interested in renting. (Note: The title is a parody on the title of the 1967 film, Guess Who's Coming to Dinner)
51	21	"Every In-Law Wants to Get Into the Act"	Elliott Lewis	Bruce Howard	March 2, 1969
Jimmy Durante guests with the Hubbards and the Buells at the Garden Club show. (Note: The title is a play on one of Jimmy Durante's most frequently used catchphrases, "Everybody wants ta get inta de act!")
52	22	"Two on the Aisle"	Elliott Lewis	Sydney Zelinka	March 16, 1969
The parents argue about two play tickets given to them by a friend. The two couples are fighting over the aisle seats, which gets them into trouble, and thrown out of the theater, but that is only the beginning, because whilst the couples are out, the Hubbards are robbed!
53	23	"Take Her, He's Mine"	Elliott Lewis	Bob Carroll Jr. & Madelyn Davis	March 23, 1969
Roger hires a beautiful secretary (Joi Lansing) whom Herb wants to work with as well; and Eve and Kaye try to convince her not to work with either one of them.
54	24	"Show Business Is No Business"	Elliott Lewis	Bob Fisher & Arthur Marx	March 30, 1969
Herb and Roger bring a surprise guest to host their lodge show, and Kaye and Eve are surprised at who it is. They then try to worm their way into the act. Don Rickles guests as himself. In the second half, Rickles begins ad-libbing, and both Arden and Ballard are visibly cracking up. This may be the earliest instance of a filmed sitcom leaving crack-ups in, as normally such scenes would be reshot.
55	25	"The Charge of the Wife Brigade"	Elliott Lewis	Bob Fisher & Arthur Marx	April 6, 1969
After Kaye and Eve are confronted on their rampant charging by their irate husbands who destroy their credit cards, they are told to get jobs. Jerry also scolds Suzie for charging a wiglet and false eyelashes with her mother's card, using forgery to get said wiglet and false eyelashes. The girls gain employment at the local department store, Young and Robbins, but are fired on their first day for goofing off and annoying their superior, Mr. Finch. The girls decide to pawn their beaver coats as a cover for their being fired, but the husbands discover the pawn tickets and their duplicity. However, all ends well, when Herb relents and decides to get Eve a new credit card, while Roger gets bitten (literally) by Kaye for not replacing her card! (Note: The title is a parody of the famous poem "The Charge of the Light Brigade".)
56	26	"The Not-So-Grand Opera"	Elliott Lewis	Elaine Di Bello Bradish	April 13, 1969
The annual Ladies Club opera is German, for a change of pace, and not Italian. This fact really irks Kaye who vies with Eve for the leading role. Marni Nixon guest stars as a hopeful for the lead role.
