= USS O'Brien (DD-725) =

Allen M. Sumner-class destroyer

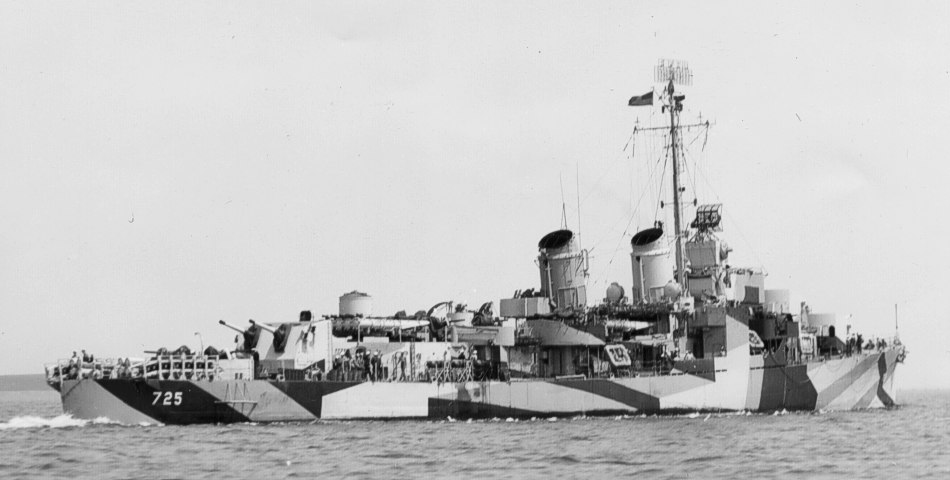
- USS O'Brien (DD-725), off Boston, Massachusetts, 3 May 1944

History

United States
- Name: O'Brien
- Namesake: Jeremiah O'Brien
- Builder: Bath Iron Works
- Laid down: 12 July 1943
- Launched: 8 December 1943
- Commissioned: 25 February 1944
- Decommissioned: 18 February 1972
- Stricken: 18 February 1972
- Fate: Sunk as target off California on 13 July 1972

General characteristics
- Class & type: Allen M. Sumner-class destroyer
- Displacement: 2,200 tons
- Length: 376 ft 6 in (114.76 m)
- Beam: 40 ft (12 m)
- Draft: 15 ft 8 in (4.78 m)
- Propulsion: 60,000 shp (45,000 kW); 2 propellers
- Speed: 34 knots (63 km/h; 39 mph)
- Range: 6,500 nmi (12,000 km; 7,500 mi) at 15 kn (28 km/h; 17 mph)
- Complement: 336
- Armament: 6 × 5 in (127 mm)/38 cal. guns, 12 × 40 mm AA guns, 11 × 20 mm AA guns, 10 × 21 inch (533 mm) torpedo tubes, 6 × depth charge projectors, 2 × depth charge tracks

USS O'Brien (DD-725), an Allen M. Sumner-class destroyer, was the fourth ship of the United States Navy to be named after Captain Jeremiah O'Brien and his five brothers, Gideon, John, William, Dennis and Joseph, who captured HMS Margaretta on 12 June 1775 during the American Revolution.

The fourth O'Brien (DD-725) was laid down by Bath Iron Works, Bath, Maine, 12 July 1943 and launched on 8 December 1943; sponsored by Miss Josephine O'Brien Campbell, great-great-great-granddaughter of Gideon O'Brien. The ship was commissioned at Boston Naval Shipyard on 25 February 1944.

== Service history ==
=== World War II ===
After shakedown out of Bermuda, British West Indies and Norfolk, Virginia O'Brien joined convoy forces 14 May 1944 en route to Scotland and England. Following patrol and escort duty near England, she participated the invasion of Normandy and in-shore Bombardment of Cherbourg. On 25 June while supporting minesweepers well inshore of the battleship Texas, which was engaging German shore batteries at Cape Levi, near Cherbourg, O'Brien's own gunfire was so accurate that enemy gunnery positions shifted from Texas to O'Brien. She received a direct hit just abaft the bridge, but was able to stay on station long enough to lay a smoke screen for Texas. Thirteen men were killed and nineteen wounded. Following temporary repairs on the Isle of Portland, England, O'Brien escorted a convoy to the Boston Naval Shipyard where she underwent extensive work.

After training in the Boston and Norfolk areas, she escorted the aircraft carrier Ticonderoga to the Pacific via the Panama Canal and San Diego for carrier operations with the 3rd Fleet east of the Philippines. In early December, she joined 7th Fleet assault forces at Ormoc Bay, Philippines. While under continuous air attack, O'Brien crewmen attempted to extinguish oil fires in Ward, caused by Japanese kamikazes, until ordered to sink the stricken transport by gunfire. O'Brien's commanding officer, Commander W. W. Outerbridge, had been in command of Ward when she had sunk a Japanese submarine off Pearl Harbor on 7 December 1941. On 15 December 1944, O'Brien fought fires in USS LST-472 caused by kamikazes, and rescued 198 survivors.

Following a brief patrol period in the Mindoro Strait she proceeded to Lingayen Gulf for the invasion of Luzon. On 6 January 1945, a Japanese aircraft crashed into the port side of her fantail causing slight damage. After several days of escort duty and shore bombardment during the landing of Army assault troops, she proceeded to Manus Island, for repairs. She joined fleet carrier forces 10 February 1945 for air strikes against Tokyo, Iwo Jima, and the Bonin Islands.

She was assigned to Task Force 54 (TF 54) for the invasion of Okinawa. Aircraft attacked her off Kerama Retto on 27 March while U.S. forces secured an advance logistics base for the Okinawa attack. One plane crashed into the water as a result of gunfire while another, an Aichi D3A "Val" carrying a 500-pound (230 kg) bomb, crashed into the port side amidships exploding a magazine. Fifty were killed or missing and seventy-six wounded.

During the summer, the ship underwent repairs at Mare Island Naval Shipyard and training at San Diego, California. As the war ended in mid-August 1945, she returned to the 3rd Fleet for patrol duty in Japanese waters. The O'Brien was assigned to Task Group 1.7 in support of Operation Crossroads, the first post-war atomic bomb testing, which took place at Bikini Atoll from June through July, 1946. O'Brien continued to operate in the eastern Pacific, Hawaii, the Marianas, and Australia through the first half of 1947. She returned to the west coast in the summer and decommissioned at San Diego on 4 October 1947.

=== Korea ===
Three years later she recommissioned at San Diego, on 5 October 1950, Commander Chester W. Nimitz Jr. in command, and became the flagship of Destroyer Division 132.

During the Korean War she first joined the TF 77 carrier group in early March 1951. Later that month she joined TF 95, the United Nations Blockading and Escort Force, and participated in the siege of Songin. On 17 July 1951, at Wonsan harbor, shore batteries opened on O'Brien, Blue and Alfred A. Cunningham from three sides in an attempt to drive UN vessels from the harbor. The ships went at once into the "War Dance", an evasive maneuver in which ships steamed in an ellipse at 22 knots (41 km/h; 25 mph) firing on batteries in each sector as their guns came to bear. This four and a half hour engagement became known as the Battle of the Buzz-saw.

In July and August O'Brien provided covering fire for LSMR bombardment, and coordinated rescue operations which saved three downed Navy pilots and one Air Force pilot. Although both Radio Moscow and Radio Peking reported O'Brien sunk by the North Korean People's Army, she returned to San Diego for repairs in late September 1951. On 23 July 1952, she returned to Korea as part of TF 95 and participated in shore bombardment, interdiction and patrol duties near Wonsan Harbor. Ordered to the 7th Fleet with the cruiser Helena, she provided search and rescue protection for carrier aircraft and shore bombardment fire on the east coast of Korea in September. The ship joined Operation "Feint", a mock invasion of Kojo from 12 to 16 October 1952, in which UN forces attempted to lure the enemy into the open. At the end of the month, she left the Korean area for exercises and repairs in Japan before returning to San Diego in mid January 1953.

=== Chinese involvement ===
From the end of the Korean action through 1960, O'Brien made annual operational cruises to the western Pacific. In late January and early February 1955, she operated with the aircraft carrier Wasp when the 7th Fleet discouraged People's Republic of China resistance to the Nationalist Chinese evacuation of the Tachen Islands off mainland China.

February to October 1961 was spent in Mare Island Naval Shipyard, Vallejo, California for FRAM II conversion. The ship now specialized in antisubmarine warfare (ASW) procedures and periodically deployed to the western Pacific. In May 1965, operating with Antisubmarine Warfare Group 1, she was one of the first ships successfully to refuel a helicopter inflight. In June O'Brien successfully refueled a helicopter from the aircraft carrier Hornet off San Francisco while it made a pioneer non-stop helicopter flight from Seattle, Washington to Imperial Beach, California.

The ship sailed for 7th Fleet duty in August and was assigned to Taiwan patrol. On 14 November 1965, while patrolling the Taiwan Straits, the ship was involved in the Battle of East Chongwu and ordered to the aid of a Chinese Nationalist patrol craft under attack by Chinese Communist torpedo boats near Wuqiu (Wuchiu), Kinmen County, Fujian Province, Republic of China (Taiwan) Arriving after the vessel had sunk, she rescued all fifteen survivors, and was praised by the Commander in Chief of the Nationalist Chinese Navy.

=== Vietnam ===
A week later 22 November 1965, more than 600 miles from the rescue, O'Brien saw her first action in the Vietnam War. Called to the aid of a surrounded outpost at Thach Ten, Quảng Ngãi Province, the ship's fire helped turn back a North Vietnamese regiment. In January and early February 1966, she supported carrier operations, conducted search and rescue missions in the Tonkin Gulf, and provided gunfire support for the amphibious landing near Cape Batangan, Operation Double Eagle.

O'Brien returned to her homeport March 1966 and operated on the west coast for the next eight months. During a port visit to The Dalles, Oregon, in July O'Brien became the largest vessel to use the locks at the Bonneville Dam and to transit the Columbia River to The Dalles.

The destroyer got underway again for the Western Pacific 5 November 1966. Following antisubmarine warfare exercises in Hawaii and the eastern South China Sea, O'Brien became flagship for Operation Sea Dragon, the surface action task unit off North Vietnam. With Maddox, she was ordered to interdict enemy coastal traffic. More than twenty vessels carrying enemy war supplies to the Viet Cong were sunk or damaged by O'Brien. On 23 December 1966, the ship received three direct hits from coastal batteries north of Đồng Hới. Two crewmen were killed and four wounded. After repairs at Subic Bay, Philippines, she provided support for air strikes from Tonkin Gulf while guarding five different carriers in January 1967. In February and March, she was assigned to Taiwan patrol. The ship returned to the Tonkin Gulf in late March first as a carrier escort and then on "Sea Dragon" operations. Again as flagship for Commander, Destroyer Division 232, she was instrumental in significantly slowing coastal supply traffic. She was taken under fire by shore batteries seven times during this period.

The ship returned to her homeport of Long Beach, California, in May 1967. In July she made a second trip to The Dalles, Oregon, before entering Long Beach Naval Shipyard for overhaul. Following refresher training at San Diego, she was assigned to destroyer squadron 29 on 1 February 1968. She returned to the 7th Fleet operations in the spring of 1968.

She put to sea for 7th Fleet operations on 30 April 1968, arriving in Japan via Pearl Harbor on 29 May. Following an ASW exercise in the Sea of Japan with Japanese warships, the destroyer sailed south for operations in the Gulf of Tonkin, beginning shore bombardment duties upon arrival on 24 June. Over the next four weeks, O'Brien supported U.S. Army and Marine operations, engaging enemy forces ashore with 5-inch gunfire. After a short port visit to Singapore in early August, the destroyer returned to Japan for a two-week upkeep period alongside tender Hector. Returning to the Gulf of Tonkin in late August, O'Brien escorted carriers at Yankee Station for the next month. On one evening, the destroyer was alerted by USS America that two men from the carrier had fallen overboard. The destroyer quickly retraced the carrier's path and rescued one sailor who had stayed afloat for over five hours. After another naval gunfire support period off South Vietnam in mid-October, O'Brien turned for home. She arrived in Long Beach on 28 November after a long southern cruise that took her to Subic Bay, Philippines; Brisbane, Australia; Pago Pago, American Samoa; and Pearl Harbor.

Following a post-deployment stand down, O'Brien conducted local training operations out of Long Beach through the summer of 1969, the highlight of which was a major warfare exercise off Hawaii in mid-March. After pre-deployment exercises in July and August, the destroyer got underway for the Far East on 8 October.

Like her previous deployment, O'Brien primarily served in Vietnamese waters, conducting carrier escort duties at Yankee Station and naval gunfire support operations through the end of the year. In January 1970, however, the destroyer steamed north to Okinawa, there joining a task group built around USS Ranger for winter exercises in the Sea of Japan. Returning to Vietnam in February, the warship spent the next two months supporting the carriers on Yankee Station before returning to Long Beach on 15 April. Once home, the destroyer underwent a quick turnaround, with a yard period and refresher training preparing the warship for another deployment starting on 6 November.

During what proved to be her last deployment, O'Brien was plagued by material and equipment problems. Before departing Pearl Harbor for Japan, for example, the destroyer suffered an evaporator failure that required a week of repairs. After arrival on the gun line off Vietnam on 13 January 1971, the warship conducted gunnery operations until a 6-foot (1.8 m) crack in her hull forced her into dry dock at Subic Bay on 2 February. Following those repairs, O'Brien commenced a seven-week period at Yankee Station and on search and rescue duty. She put in at Subic Bay for repairs again on 17 April and sailed for home at the end of the month, arriving home on 29 May after stops at Manus Island; Brisbane, Australia; Auckland, New Zealand; and Pago Pago, American Samoa.

== End of career ==
O'Brien decommissioned at Long Beach on 18 February 1972 and was struck from the Navy List that same day. The hulk was towed out to sea by tug USS Sioux and sunk as a target off California on 13 July 1972.

O'Brien (DD-725) received six battle stars for World War II service, five battle stars for Korean War service, and three battle stars for Vietnam service (1967).
