= USS Keosanqua (AT-38) =

Tugboat of the United States Navy

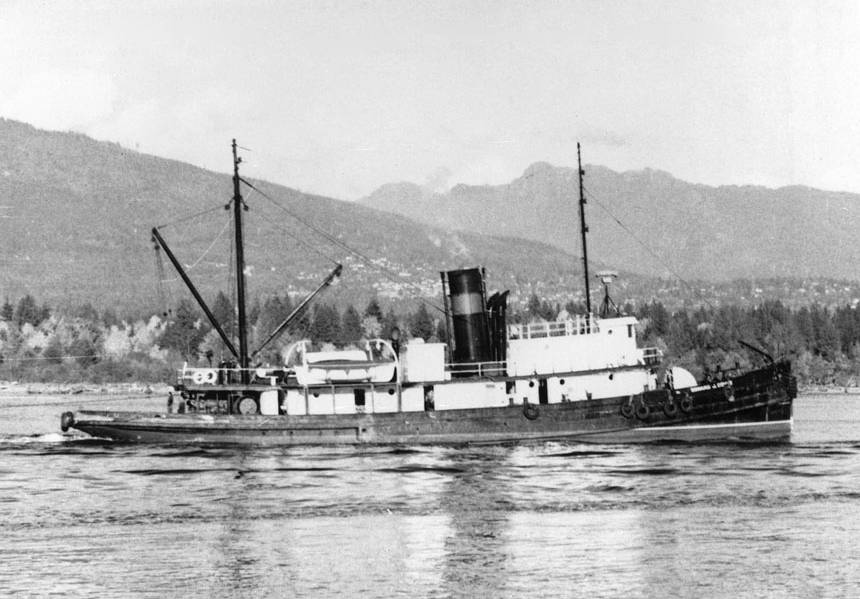
- Ex-Keosanqua in Canadian waters as Edward J. Coyle.

History

United States
- Name: Keosanqua
- Builder: Staten Island Shipbuilding Company
- Launched: 26 February 1920
- Commissioned: 9 December 1920
- Recommissioned: 1 July 1934
- Decommissioned: 8 June 1922; 6 May 1946
- Stricken: 7 February 1947
- Fate: Transferred to the Maritime Commission for disposal, 11 July 1947

General characteristics
- Class & type: Bagaduce-class fleet tug
- Displacement: 969 long tons (985 t)
- Length: 156 ft 8 in (47.75 m)
- Beam: 30 ft 2 in (9.19 m)
- Draft: 14 ft 7 in (4.45 m)
- Speed: 13 kn (15 mph; 24 km/h)
- Complement: 61
- Armament: 2 × 3 in (76 mm) guns

The first USS Keosanqua (AT-38) was launched 26 February 1920 by Staten Island Shipbuilding Company, Port Richmond, New York; and commissioned 9 December 1920 at New York Navy Yard.

Departing New York on 2 February 1921, Keosanqua sailed for Hawaii via Charleston, the Panama Canal, and San Diego. Arriving Pearl Harbor on 16 April 1921, the tug was based at the Navy Yard there, towing ships and targets until she decommissioned on 8 June 1922.

Keosanqua recommissioned at Pearl Harbor on 1 July 1934. During the remainder of 1934, she operated with Submarine Squadron 4 (SubRon 4), towing targets and retrieving torpedoes; she provided similar services for SubRon 9 the following year. Duty with submarines continued until January 1938, when she commenced towing operations with the Pacific Fleet, participating in joint Army-Navy maneuvers off Oahu during May 1939. She was assigned to the Navy Yard, Pearl Harbor, on 29 January 1940 for harbor tug duty.

On 7 December 1941, Keosanqua was taking over a tow from Antares southwest of the entrance to Pearl Harbor when the infamous Japanese raid began. Attacked by enemy planes which bombed and strafed the ship, she promptly opened fire with her machine guns. During the attack, she coolly completed the transfer of the tow and proceeded to Honolulu unharmed. After the raid, she operated as a salvage tug, swept for mines, and searched for enemy submarines. She departed on 21 December 1943 for towing duty in the central Pacific.

Assigned to ServRon 4, she arrived Funafuti, Ellice Islands, on 4 January 1944 for harbor duty. Proceeding in convoy en route to the Marshalls on 28 February, she reached Kwajalein on 8 March and joined ServRon 10 on 17 March; then departed on 1 April for Eniwetok with a barge of aviation gasoline in tow. She arrived on 4 April and commenced operations as harbor tug, station ship, and harbor pilot-training ship.

Redesignated ATO-38 on 15 May, she operated out of Eniwetok until 25 November 1945, and then proceeded via Kwajalein, Johnston Island, and Pearl Harbor for the West Coast, arriving San Francisco on 24 December for towing duty along the California coast. Keosanqua sailed for Seattle on 25 February 1946; and, arriving Blake Island on 1 March, she decommissioned on 6 May. Her name was struck from the Navy List on 7 February 1947.

Transferred to the Maritime Commission on 11 July 1947 for disposal, she was sold the same day to Puget Sound Tug & Barge Co., Seattle, Wash. Resold to a Canadian shipping firm in 1948, she was renamed Edward J. Coyle. In 1960, she was renamed Commodore Straits.
