= Todoroki Station =

Todoroki Station is the name of two train stations in Japan:

- Todoroki Station (Aomori) (驫木駅) in Fukaura Town, Aomori Prefecture
- Todoroki Station (Tokyo) (等々力駅) in Tokyo
