= USS Delphinus (AF-24) =

Cargo ship of the United States Navy

History

United States
- Name: USS Delphinus
- Builder: Workman, Clark and Co., Ltd., Belfast
- Laid down: 1915, as SS San Mateo
- Launched: 5 May 1915
- Acquired: 11 August 1942
- Commissioned: 11 August 1942
- Decommissioned: 8 May 1946
- Renamed: Delphinus, 22 August 1942
- Fate: Returned to the War Shipping Administration, 8 May 1946

General characteristics
- Type: Store ship
- Displacement: 5,230 long tons (5,314 t) full load
- Length: 328 ft (100 m)
- Beam: 44 ft 2 in (13.46 m)
- Draft: 23 ft (7.0 m)
- Propulsion: Reciprocating engines, single screw, 2,500 shp (1,864 kW)
- Speed: 12.5 knots (23.2 km/h; 14.4 mph)
- Complement: 107
- Armament: 1 × 4"/50 caliber guns; 1 × 3"/50 caliber guns; 6 × 20 mm guns

USS Delphinus (AF-24) was built in 1915 as SS San Mateo by Workman Clark and Co., Ltd., Belfast, Northern Ireland; acquired by the U.S. Navy 11 August 1942; and commissioned the same day as San Mateo. She was assigned the name Delphinus on 22 August 1942.

== World War II Pacific operations ==
Departing San Francisco, California, 12 September 1942, Delphinus arrived at Auckland, New Zealand, 4 October. She operated from this base until the end of 1945, carrying chilled and frozen provisions to forward bases in the South Pacific and to the Society, Fiji, and Samoan Islands.

After calling at Manila in January 1946, Delphinus sailed for the west coast, arriving at San Francisco, California, 23 February. For a brief period she carried cargo along the west coast and to Pearl Harbor, then sailed to New Orleans, Louisiana.

== End-of-War Decommissioning ==
Delphinus was decommissioned on 8 May 1946 in New Orleans, and was delivered to the War Shipping Administration the same day.
