= Guild of St. John, Deritend =

Medieval guild in England

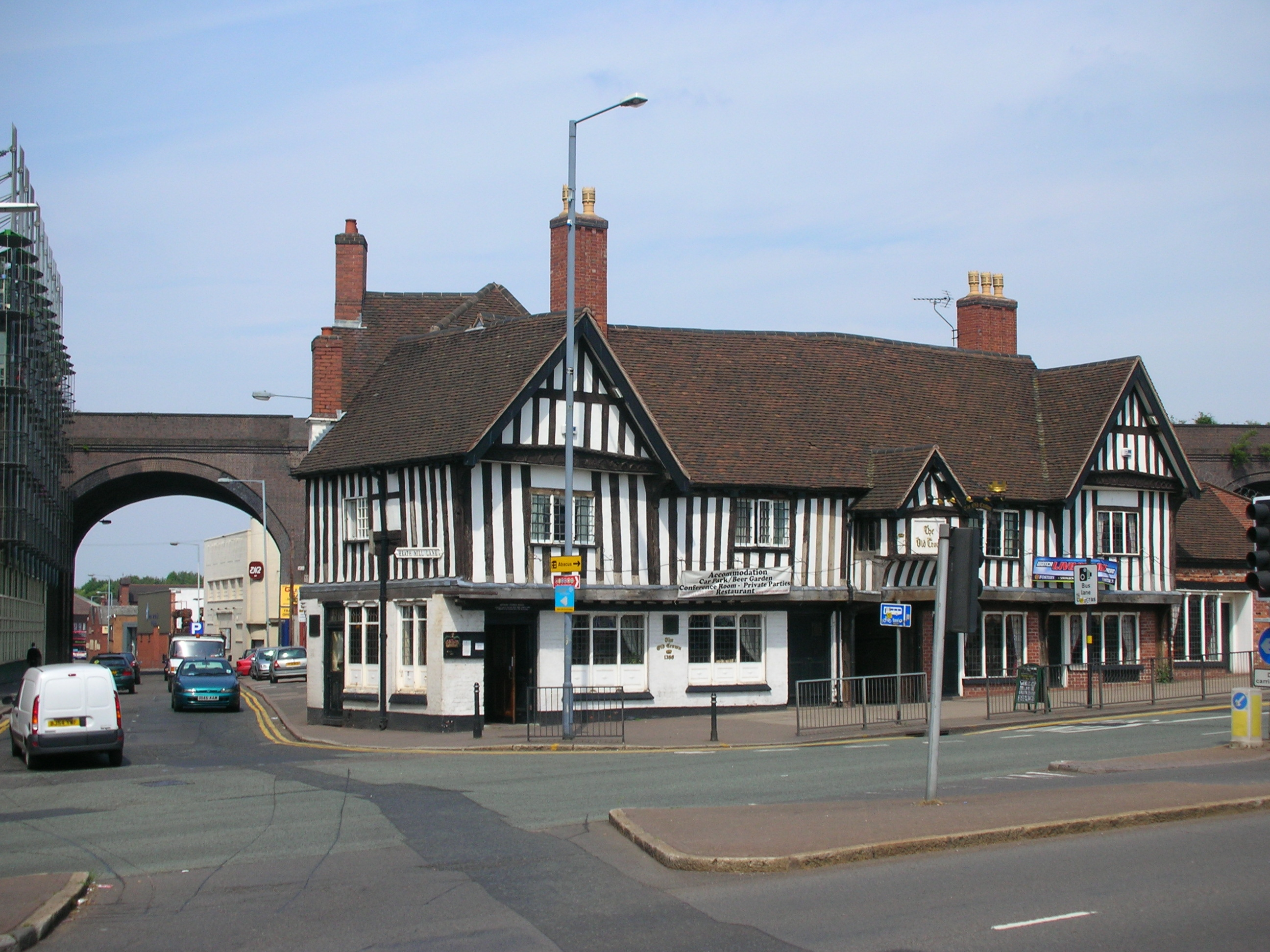
The Old Crown, originally the hall of the Guild of St John

The Guild or Gild of St John the Baptist was an English medieval religious guild in Deritend - an area of the manor of Birmingham within the parish of Aston. It maintained the priest of St John's Chapel, Deritend as its own chaplain, paying his stipend of £5 per year, and also supported a grammar school with its own schoolmaster.

The Guild survived the investigations of the commissioners established by Henry VIII in 1545 to examine the religious endowments that remained after the dissolution of the monasteries, but was suppressed along with its associated chantry under Edward VI in 1547. All of the guild's property was sold in 1549, except for the chapel itself. The late 14th-century guildhall survives as the Old Crown Inn, the oldest remaining building of medieval Birmingham.

The order also built the Guildhall in nearby Henley in Arden.

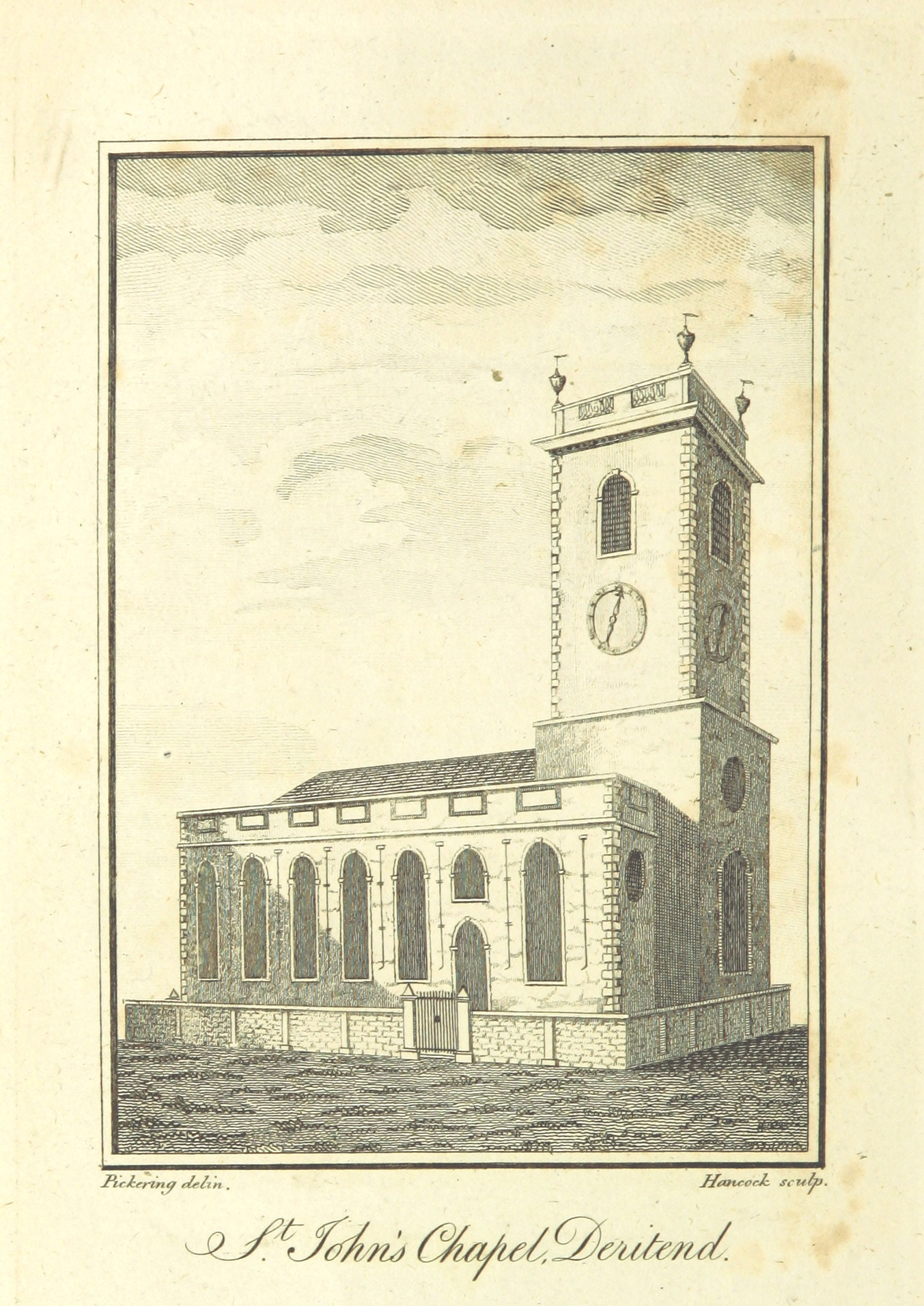
St John's chapel, c1809

== Bibliography ==
- Gill, Conrad (1952), Manor and borough to 1865, History of Birmingham, vol. 1, London: Oxford University Press
