= Literature of Birmingham =

American literary tradition

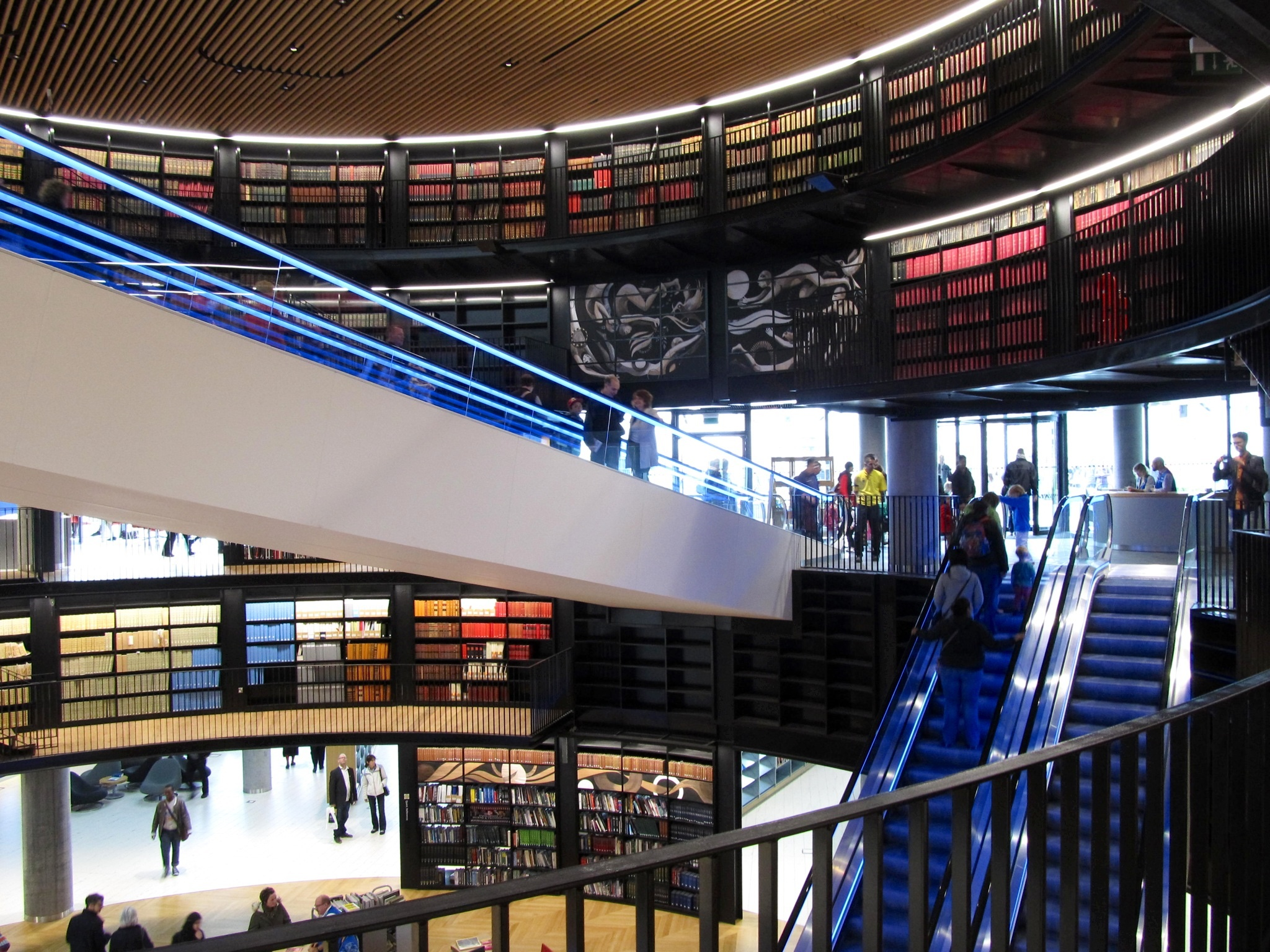
The interior of the Library of Birmingham

The literary tradition of Birmingham originally grew out of the culture of religious puritanism that developed in the town in the 16th and 17th centuries. Birmingham's location away from established centres of power, its dynamic merchant-based economy, and its weak aristocracy gave it a reputation as a place where loyalty to the established power structures of church and feudal state were weak, and saw it emerge as a haven for free-thinkers and radicals, encouraging the birth of a vibrant culture of writing, printing, and publishing.

The 18th century saw the town's radicalism widen to encompass other literary areas, and while Birmingham's tradition of vigorous literary debate on theological issues was to survive into the Victorian era, the writers of the Midlands Enlightenment brought new thinking to areas as diverse as poetry, philosophy, history, fiction, and children's literature. By the Victorian era Birmingham was one of the largest towns in England and at the forefront of the emergence of modern industrial society, a fact reflected in its role as both a subject and a source for the newly dominant literary form of the novel. The diversification of the city's literary output continued into the 20th century, encompassing writing as varied as the uncompromising modernist fiction of Henry Green, the science fiction of John Wyndham, the popular romance of Barbara Cartland, the children's stories of the Rev W. Awdry, the theatre criticism of Kenneth Tynan, and the travel writing of Bruce Chatwin.

Writers with roots in Birmingham have had an international influence. John Rogers compiled the first complete authorised edition of The Bible to appear in the English Language. Samuel Johnson was a leading literary figure of 18th century England and produced A Dictionary of the English Language. J. R. R. Tolkien is a dominant figure in the genre of fantasy fiction and one of the bestselling authors in the history of the world. W. H. Auden's work has been called the greatest body of poetry written in the English Language over the last century. Other notable contemporary writers from the city include David Lodge, Jim Crace, Roy Fisher, and Benjamin Zephaniah.

The city also has a tradition of distinctive literary subcultures including the Puritan writers who established the first Birmingham Library in the 1640s, the 18th century philosophers, scientists, and poets of the Lunar Society and the Shenstone Circle, the Victorian Catholic revival writers associated with Oscott College and the Birmingham Oratory, and the politically engaged 1930s writers of Highfield and the Birmingham Group. This tradition continues today with notable groups of writers associated with the University of Birmingham, the Tindal Street Press, and the city's burgeoning crime fiction, science fiction, and poetry scenes.

== Medieval and early modern literature ==
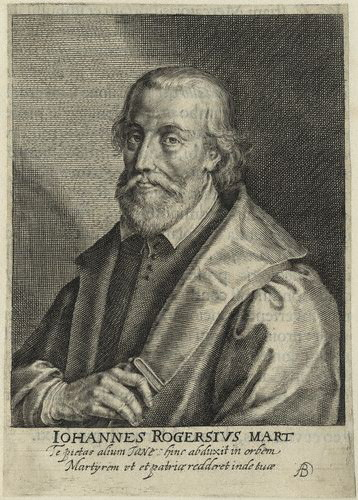
John Rogers, editor of the first complete authorised version of the Bible to be printed in the English language

Little evidence remains of the culture of medieval Birmingham, but with a priory and two chantries in the town itself, another priory in Aston, grammar schools in Deritend, Yardley and King's Norton, and the religious institutions of the Guild of the Holy Cross and the Guild of St. John, Deritend, the area would have supported a substantial community of learned religious men from the 13th century onwards.

The first Birmingham literary figure of lasting significance was John Rogers, who was born in Deritend in 1500 and educated at the Grammar School of the Guild of St. John, and who compiled, edited and partially translated the 1537 Matthew Bible, the first complete authorised version of the Bible to be printed in the English language. This was the most influential of the early English printed Bibles, providing the basis for the later Great Bible and Authorized King James Version. Rogers' translation of Philipp Melanchthon's Weighing of the Interim probably took place between Rogers' return to Deritend from Wittenberg in 1547 and his move to London in 1550, and is the earliest book written by a Birmingham author known to have been printed in England. Rogers' profile as a prominent figure in the Protestant church led to his arrest after the restoration of Roman Catholicism by Mary I, and on 14 February 1555 he became the first Protestant to be burned at the stake in the Marian Persecutions, leaving behind a written account of his three interrogations that was to establish him as an icon of martyrdom and the refusal to recant one's individual conscience. The poem he left to his children at his death, exhorting them to a Godly life and including his famous instruction for them to "Abhor that arrant Whore of Rome", was included in The New England Primer of 1690, becoming a major influence on the Puritan educational outlook of 18th century Colonial America.

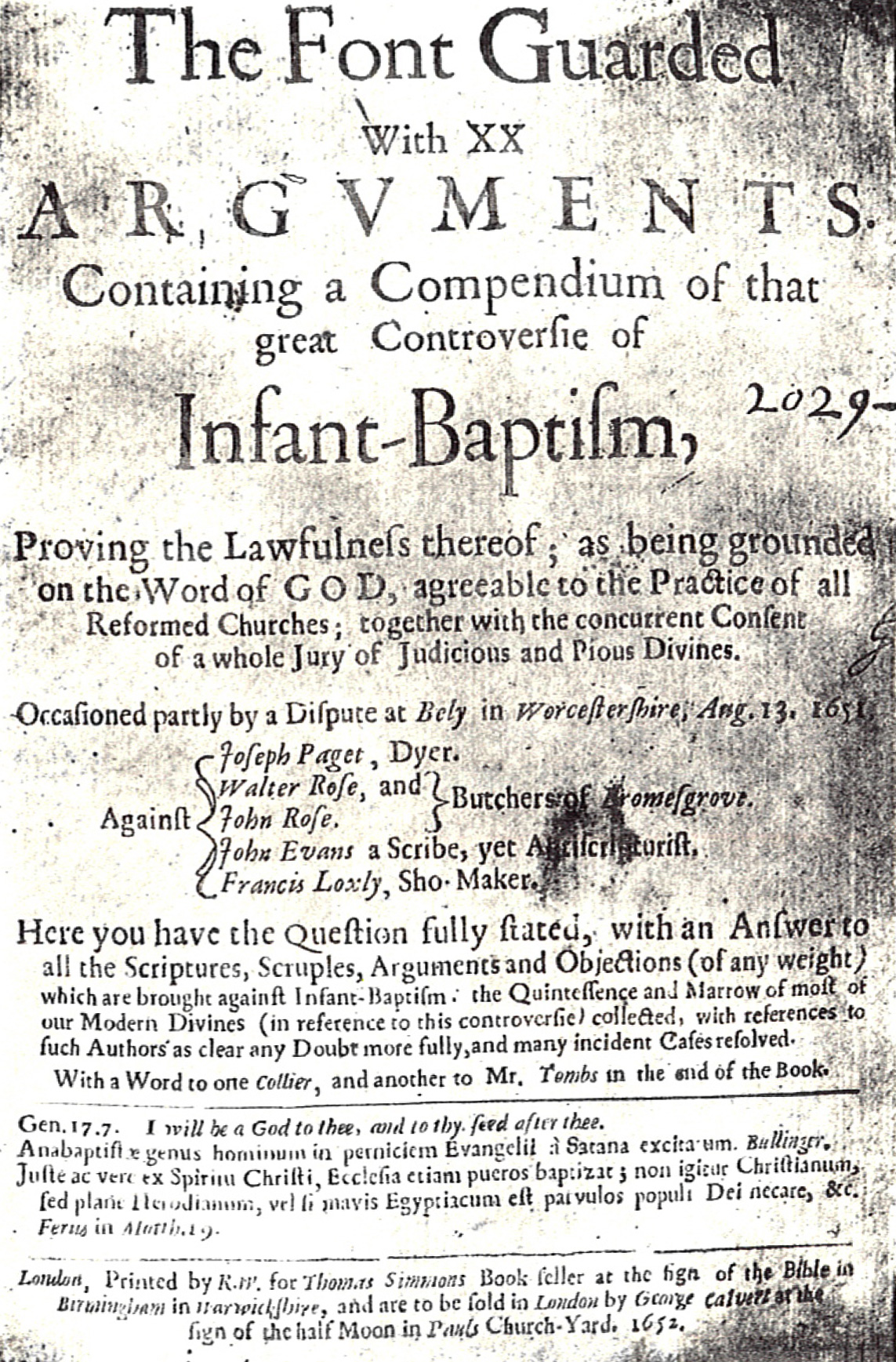
Thomas Hall's The Font Guarded of 1652 – the first known Birmingham-published book

It is in the mid 17th century that the first evidence of a distinctive and sustained literary culture emerges within Birmingham, based around a group of writers working at the heart of the town's growth as a centre of religious puritanism and political radicalism. John Barton, the headmaster of King Edward's School, was the author of The Art of Rhetorick in 1634 and The Latine Grammar composed in the English Tongue in 1652, but is best known for Prince Rupert's burning love for England, discovered in Birmingham's flames – a widely circulated, influential and vitriolic anti-Royalist tract that documented the sacking of the town by Prince Rupert of the Rhine at the Battle of Birmingham of 1643. Anthony Burgess wrote numerous sermons and theological works while the rector of Sutton Coldfield between 1635 and 1662, entering into a prolonged if amicable theological dispute in print with Richard Baxter that culminated in a face-to-face debate in Birmingham in September 1650. Francis Roberts was similarly prolific during his tenure as vicar of Birmingham's St Martin in the Bull Ring, with many of his works of popular or scholarly theology becoming nationally known and running through numerous editions. Thomas Hall was the master of the King's Norton Grammar School from 1629, and the minister of the adjacent St Nicolas' Church from 1650, but from the 1630s onwards was drawn into the radical circles of nearby Birmingham. He was the author of a long series of polemical works, combining both populist and erudite writing on religious and social matters. His 1652 volume The Font Guarded – a defence of the practice of infant baptism – was the first book known to have been published as well as written in Birmingham, and provides the first definite evidence of booksellers operating within the town. Between 1635 and 1642 Roberts, Hall and Barton were involved in establishing the first Birmingham Library, one of the earliest public libraries in England.

This culture of radical writing grew with the influx of Nonconformists and ejected ministers seeking asylum in Birmingham following the Act of Uniformity 1662 and the Five Mile Act 1665, which forbade dissenting ministers from living within five miles of a chartered borough but didn't apply to highly populous but unincorporated Birmingham. A vast number of essays and printed sermons on issues of religious controversy were produced by these radical clerics and their opponents over the following decades, in turn encouraging the further growth of the town's book trade. The era also saw the birth of a Birmingham street literature, with broadside ballads on Birmingham subjects surviving from the middle years of the 17th century. An Act of Parliament restricting the number of master printers in England meant that literature written and published in Birmingham could not be printed in the town, however, being produced only in London until the Act was repealed in 1693.

== Literature of the Midlands Enlightenment ==
Birmingham during the 18th century lay at the heart of the English experience of the Age of Enlightenment, as the free-thinking dissenting tradition developed in the town over the previous century blossomed into the cultural movement now known as the Midlands Enlightenment. Birmingham's literary infrastructure grew dramatically over the period. At least seven booksellers are recorded as existing by 1733 with the largest in 1786 claiming a stock of 30,000 titles in several languages. Books could be borrowed from the eight or nine commercial lending libraries established over the course of the 18th century, and from more specialist research-driven libraries such as the Birmingham Library and St. Philip's Parish Library. Evidence of printers working in Birmingham can be found from 1713, and the rise of John Baskerville in the 1750s saw the town's printing and publishing industry achieve international significance. By the end of the century Birmingham had developed a highly literate society, and it was claimed that the town's population of around 50,000 read 100,000 books per month.

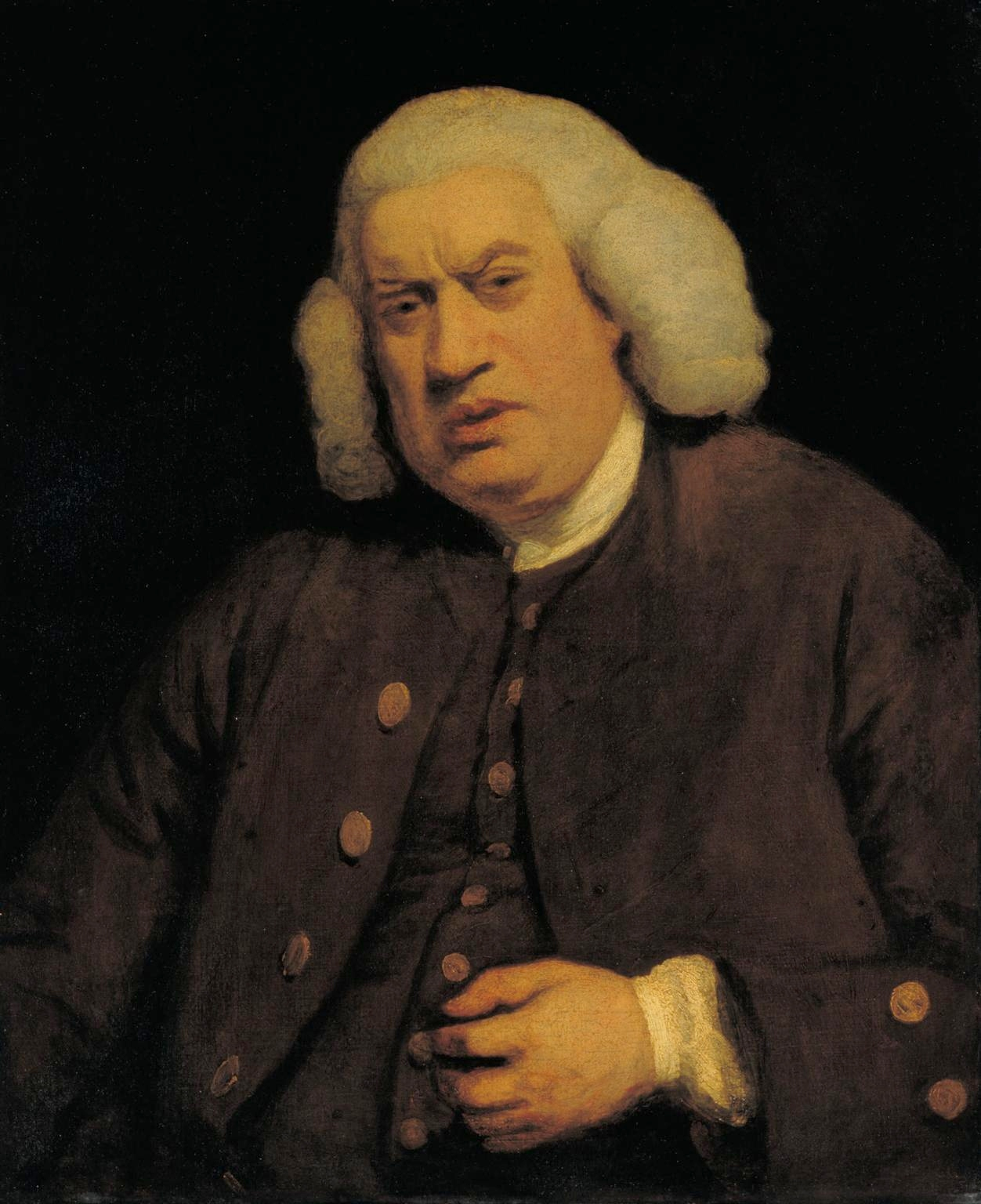
Samuel Johnson, whose literary career started in Birmingham in 1732

The most significant author associated with Birmingham during the Enlightenment era was Samuel Johnson—poet, novelist, literary critic, journalist, satirist and biographer; the author of A Dictionary of the English Language; the leading literary figure of the 18th century; and "arguably the most distinguished man of letters in English history". Johnson's background was closely tied to Birmingham and its book trade: his father maintained a bookstall on the Birmingham Market, his uncle and brother were both booksellers in the town, his mother was a native of King's Norton, and his wife Elizabeth ("Tetty"), whom he married when both were living in the town in 1735, was the widow of Henry Porter, a Birmingham merchant. Johnson's own literary career started in Birmingham where he lived for three years from 1732 after failing to establish himself as a teacher in his native Lichfield. His essays for Thomas Warren's Birmingham Journal were his first published writing, and it was in Birmingham – also for Warren – that he wrote and had published his first book: a translation of Jerónimo Lobo's A Voyage to Abyssinia. This "combination of the travelogue and religious polemic", with a preface written by Johnson himself, was pitched towards the dissenting culture of the Birmingham area and its widespread suspicion of religious fanaticism, but also aligned Johnson with the empirical and Renaissance humanist tradition of the post-reformation European intellectual elite, themes that would emerge repeatedly throughout his following work. This early work also established Johnson's practice of building his literary output around adapting and responding to the work of others – "a sort of rhetoric applied to the print world" – that was to form the basis of his prodigious output over the course of his career. Johnson maintained an extensive set of social and business connections in Birmingham throughout his lifetime and continued to visit the town regularly until a month before his death in 1784.

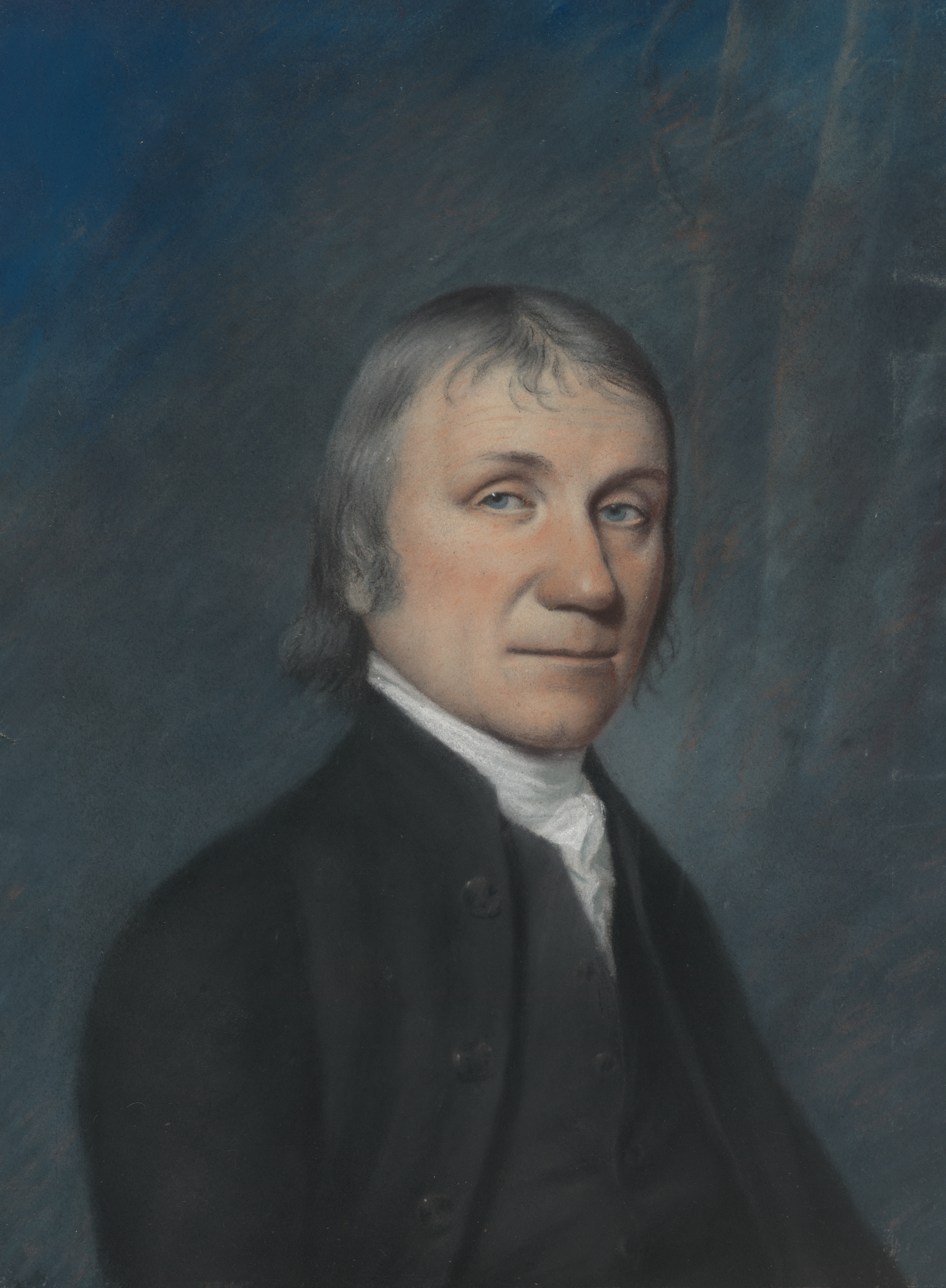
Joseph Priestley

Although the Lunar Society of Birmingham is best known for its scientific discoveries and its influence on the Industrial Revolution, it also included several members notable as writers. Erasmus Darwin's 1791 poem The Botanic Garden established him for a period as the leading English poet of his day, and was a major influence on the Romantic poetry of William Blake, William Wordsworth, Samuel Taylor Coleridge, Percy Bysshe Shelley, and John Keats. Thomas Day – an ardent follower of the French philosopher Jean-Jacques Rousseau – wrote an early series of radical poems including the anti-slavery work The Dying Negro (with John Bicknell) in 1773, and a passionate defence of the American Revolution The Devoted Legions in 1776. He is however best known for his books for children, particularly his 1789 work Sandford and Merton, which remained the most widely read and influential children's book for a century after its publication, and whose proto-socialist outlook was "to play a crucial role in moulding the ethos of nineteenth-century England". Joseph Priestley wrote voluminously on an exceptionally wide range of subjects including theology, history, education and rhetoric. As a philosopher he had considerable contemporary influence, arguing for materialist, determinist and scientific realist viewpoints and influencing the thought of Richard Price, Thomas Reid and Immanuel Kant. His political writings centred around the ideas of providentialism and the importance of individual liberty, while his work The Rudiments of English Grammar established him as "one of the great grammarians of his time."

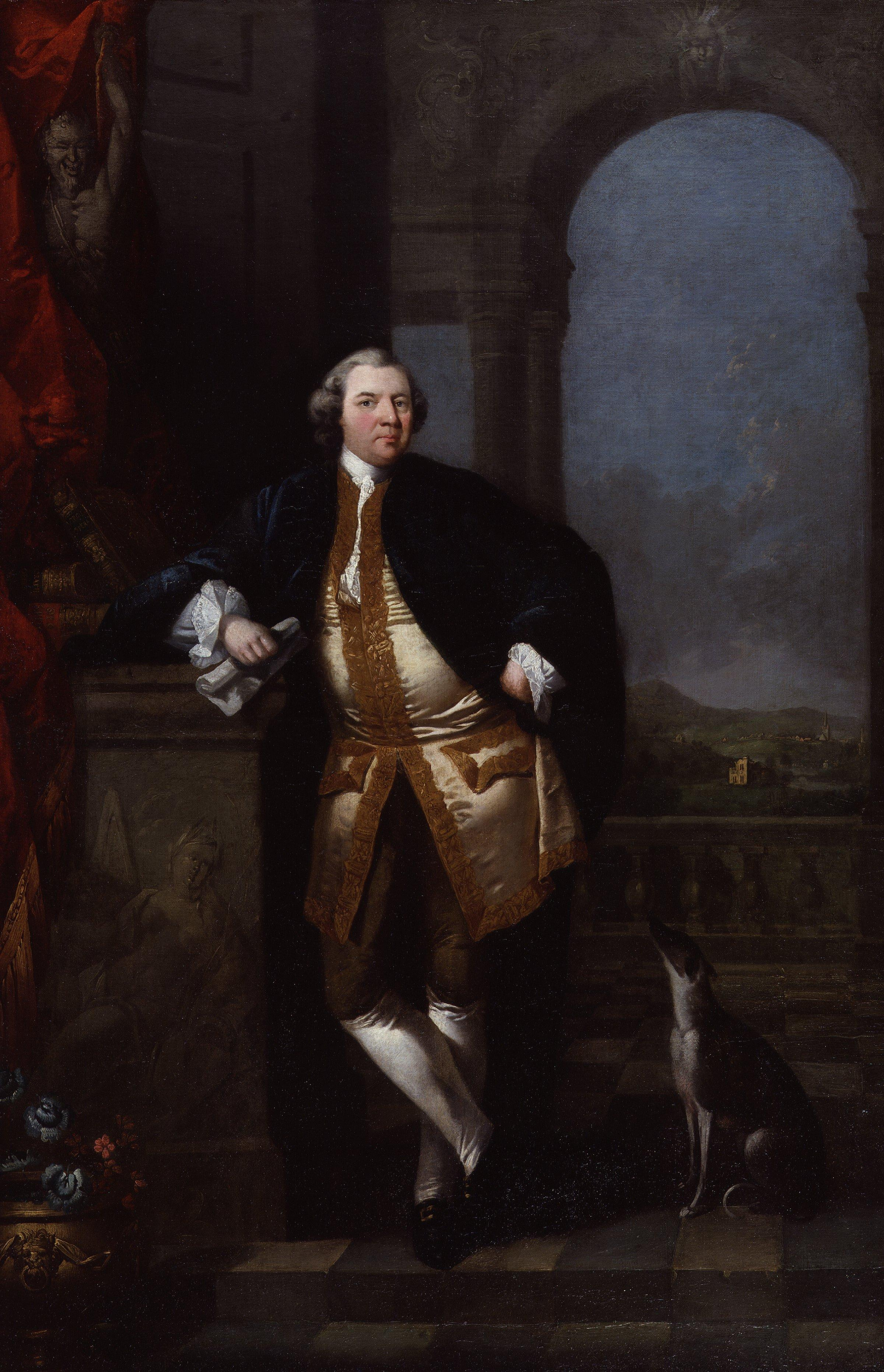
William Shenstone

The 18th century saw Birmingham's written output diversify further from its earlier focus on religious polemic. William Hutton, though born in Derby, became Birmingham's first historian, publishing his History of Birmingham in 1782. The rationalist philosopher William Wollaston – best known for his 1722 work The Religion of Nature Delineated – was a master for a period at the Birmingham Grammar School. The poet Charles Lloyd was born in Birmingham, the son of one of the partners in Lloyds Bank. Noted for his radicalism, he was a friend of Samuel Taylor Coleridge, Charles Lamb, William Wordsworth, Robert Southey and Thomas de Quincey; and was widely attacked by conservative publicists in the aftermath of the French Revolution for poems such as his 1798 Blank Verse, celebrating "the promis'd time … when equal man / Shall deem the world his temple". Henry Francis Cary, a translator best known for his version of Dante's Divine Comedy, was educated at grammar schools in Sutton Coldfield and Birmingham during the 1780s and published a volume of Odes & Sonnets in 1788 while at the latter. The poet William Shenstone had houses in Birmingham and Quinton as well as his famous estate The Leasowes to the west of Birmingham near Halesowen. He lay at the centre of the Shenstone Circle – a group of writers and poets from the Birmingham area that included Richard Jago, John Scott Hylton, John Pixell, Richard Graves, Mary Whateley and Joseph Giles – a role that saw him described as the "Maecenas of the Midlands".

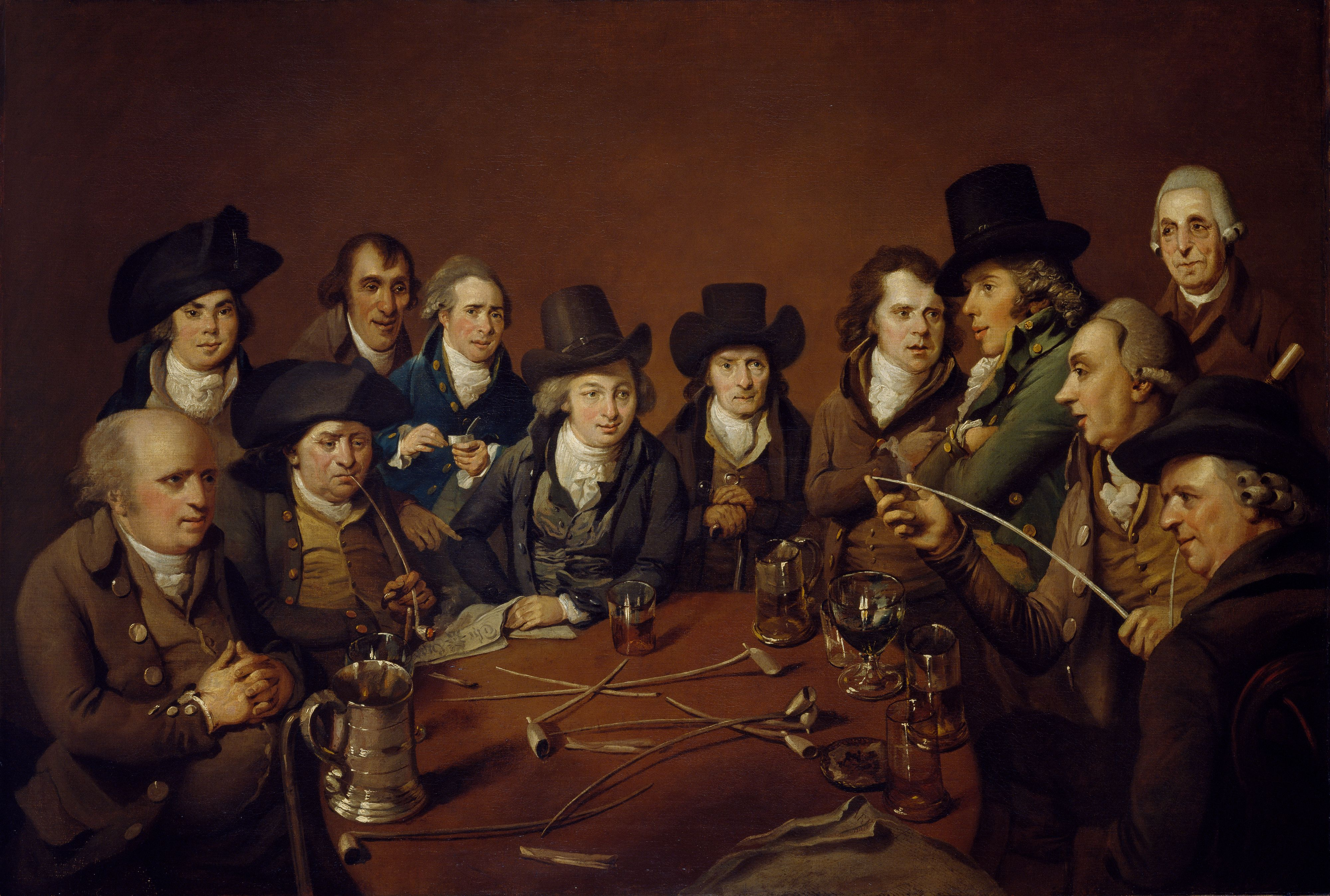
John Freeth and his Circle – the radical Birmingham Book Club, which met at Freeth's Coffee House

The century also saw Birmingham emerge as the centre of a vibrant and sophisticated culture of popular street literature, as the town's printers produced increasing numbers of the broadsides and chapbooks that formed the primary reading matter of the poor. Cheaply printed and carrying traditional songs, newly written ballads on topical matters, simple folk-tales with wood-cut illustrations, and news – particularly salacious coverage of gruesome crimes, executions, riots and wars – broadsides and chapbooks were sold or exchanged by itinerant chapmen – also called "patterers" or "ballad-mongers" – who often displayed their goods in the street on a small table or pinned to a wall. Although much of this work was by its nature ephemeral and low in literary quality, Birmingham was unusual in that the town's high level of social mobility meant that printers of street literature often overlapped with printers of weightier material, some writers of street literature were highly educated and of respectable social standing, and several writers of Birmingham broadside ballads had a lasting influence on the town's literary culture. Job Nott – probably a pseudonym of Theodore Price of Harborne – was a largely conservative figure who produced a wide range of pamphlets and broadsides on topical matters, attracting imitators as far afield as Bristol. John Freeth's influence was even greater: nearly 400 of his political ballads were published and distributed nationally in a dozen separate collections between 1766 and 1805, the best-known being his 1790 collection The Political Songster. An outstanding figure in the radical circles of the late-Georgian town, he hosted the Birmingham Book Club at John Freeth's Coffee House, giving him a national political importance and placing him at the heart of Birmingham's developing political self-consciousness during the upheavals of the American Revolution.

== Regency and Victorian literature ==
=== 19th century fiction ===
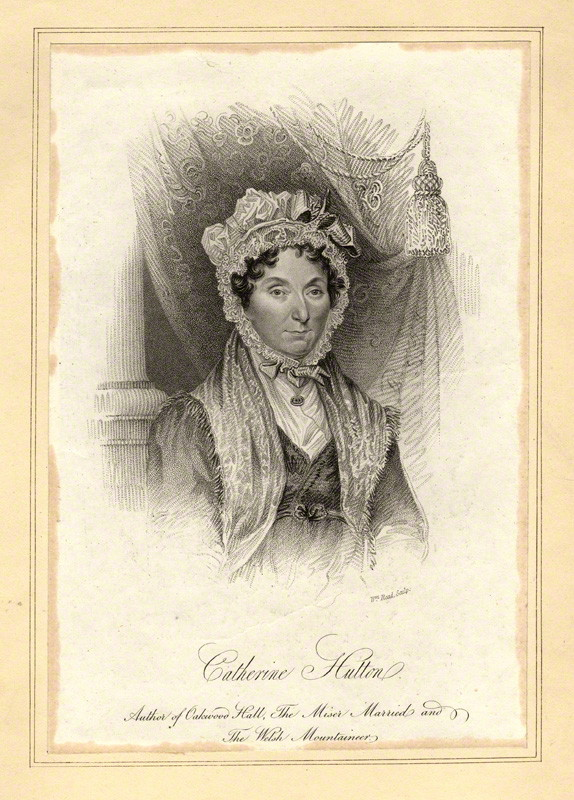
Catherine Hutton

The 19th century saw the short story and the novel emerge as major features of Birmingham's literary output. A transitional figure was Catherine Hutton, the daughter of Birmingham historian William Hutton, who was first notable as a correspondent of many of the leading literary figures of the late 18th century, but who published her first novel The Miser Married in 1813. This was itself written as a series of 63 letters discussing personal, social and literary issues among the fictional correspondents, and was followed by two further epistolary novels – The Welsh Mountaineers in 1817 and Oakwood Hall in 1819.

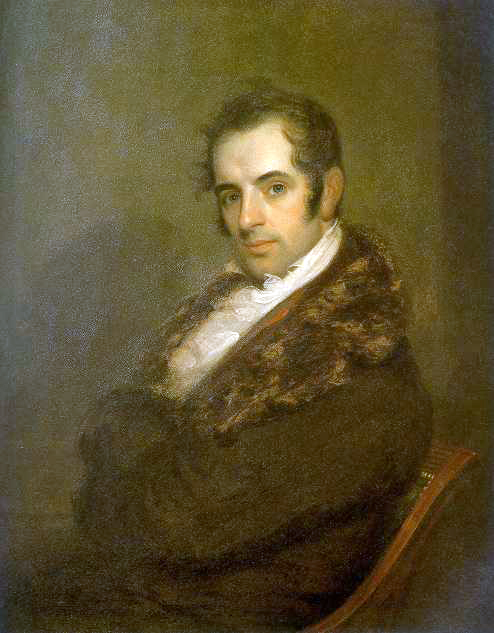
Washington Irving

Washington Irving, who was born in New York City and is regarded as the United States' first successful professional man of letters, spent many years in Birmingham after his first visit to the town in 1815, living with his sister and her husband in Ladywood, the Jewellery Quarter and Edgbaston. His best-known works – the short stories "The Legend of Sleepy Hollow" and "Rip Van Winkle" – were both written in Birmingham, as was his first and best-known novel Bracebridge Hall of 1821, whose setting was loosely based on Birmingham's Aston Hall. Many of his later works, including Tales of the Alhambra and Mahomet and His Successors, were completed in Birmingham after being drafted on his wider European travels. Thomas Adolphus Trollope worked as a schoolteacher in Birmingham before establishing himself as a successful novelist, journalist and travel writer and moving to Florence in Italy, where his house became a magnet for British literary figures such as Charles Dickens, George Eliot and Elizabeth Barrett Browning. Isabella Varley Banks was born in Manchester and is best known for her 1876 novel The Manchester Man, but her career as a novelist started only after she moved to Birmingham in 1846 after marrying local journalist, poet and playwright George Linnaeus Banks. Her twelve novels were set in a variety of locations including Birmingham, Yorkshire, Wiltshire, Durham, Chester, and Manchester; each book being particularly notable for its faithful reproduction of local dialect and pronunciation. West Bromwich-born David Christie Murray received his training as a writer as a journalist under George Dawson on the Birmingham Daily Post. Several of his novels were set in Birmingham including A Rising Star of 1894 – the story of a Birmingham reporter with literary aspirations – with many more set in surrounding areas such as the Black Country and Cannock Chase.

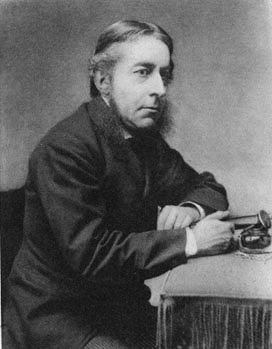
Joseph Henry Shorthouse

Protestant religion remained a theme common to much of Birmingham's literary output during the 19th century. John Inglesant – the "philosophical romance" that was the first and best-known work of the Birmingham novelist Joseph Henry Shorthouse – became a publishing triumph in the atmosphere of highly charged religious controversy of the 1880s, seeing its author "fêted throughout the literary world", the object of admiration from writers as varied as Charlotte Mary Yonge, T. H. Huxley and Edmund Gosse, and the subject of an invitation to breakfast at 10 Downing Street by William Gladstone. The result of 30 years of study and over 10 years of writing, the novel told the story of a 17th-century English soldier and diplomat, his travels through England and Italy and his excursions through the principal religious philosophies of the time – Puritanism, Anglicanism, Roman Catholicism, Quietism and Humanism – as a recreation of Shorthouse's own intellectual journey from Quakerism to the Church of England . Shorthouse wrote four other novels and a book of short stories over subsequent years, all of which catalogued their protagonists "protracted torments of conscience". Emma Jane Guyton published over fifty popular and oft-reprinted novels between 1846 and 1882, most of which used their commonplace domestic settings to communicate an ecumenical Protestant or strongly anti-Catholic message. Ashted-born George Mogridge started writing for children on religious and moral issues in 1827 after a varied early life that included periods working as a japanner in Birmingham's metal trades and living as a tramp in France. He eventually wrote 226 successful and widely marketed books, including stories, collections, verse and plays; anonymously and under more than 20 pseudonyms including Old Humphrey, Ephraim Holding, Old Father Thames, Peter Parley, Grandfather Gregory, Amos Armfield, Grandmamma Gilbert, Aunt Upton, and X.Y.Z. At the time of his death in 1854 it was estimated that his books had sold a total of over 15 million copies across Britain and America.

The Victorian era also saw Birmingham featuring as a setting for novelists from outside the town, placing it at the forefront of the fictional representation of industrial England's major urban centres. Five years before Elizabeth Gaskell's 1848 portrayal of Manchester in Mary Barton, and nine years before Charles Dickens' Hard Times was loosely set in Preston, Charlotte Elizabeth Tonna gave a graphic depiction of working life in Birmingham in her 1843 four-part novel The Wrongs of Woman, emphasising the exploitation of women in backstreet factories and the corrosive influence of industrial employment. The anonymously written 1848 novella How to Get on in the World: The Story of Peter Lawley presented a more optimistic view, showing the positive consequences of learning to read for the poverty-stricken son of a Birmingham nailer. George Gissing's Eve's Ransom of 1894 presented Birmingham as a bustling metropolis of questionable values, with traffic "speedily passing from the region of main streets and great edifices into a squalid district of factories and workshops and crowded by-ways", while Mabel Collins used Birchampton – a thinly disguised Birmingham – as the setting for her gothic novel The Star Sapphire of 1896. Passing references in more widely set fiction also provide evidence of Birmingham's growing significance in the culture of Victorian England. Benjamin Disraeli's 1845 novel Sybil uses Birmingham as a background political barometer – "They're always ready for a riot in Birmingham… The sufferings of '39 will keep Birmingham in check", while Charlotte Brontë's 1849 Shirley sees the town at the root of the changes sweeping England – "In Birmingham I considered closely, and at their source, the causes of the present troubles of this country".

=== Crime fiction, science fiction and other genre fiction ===
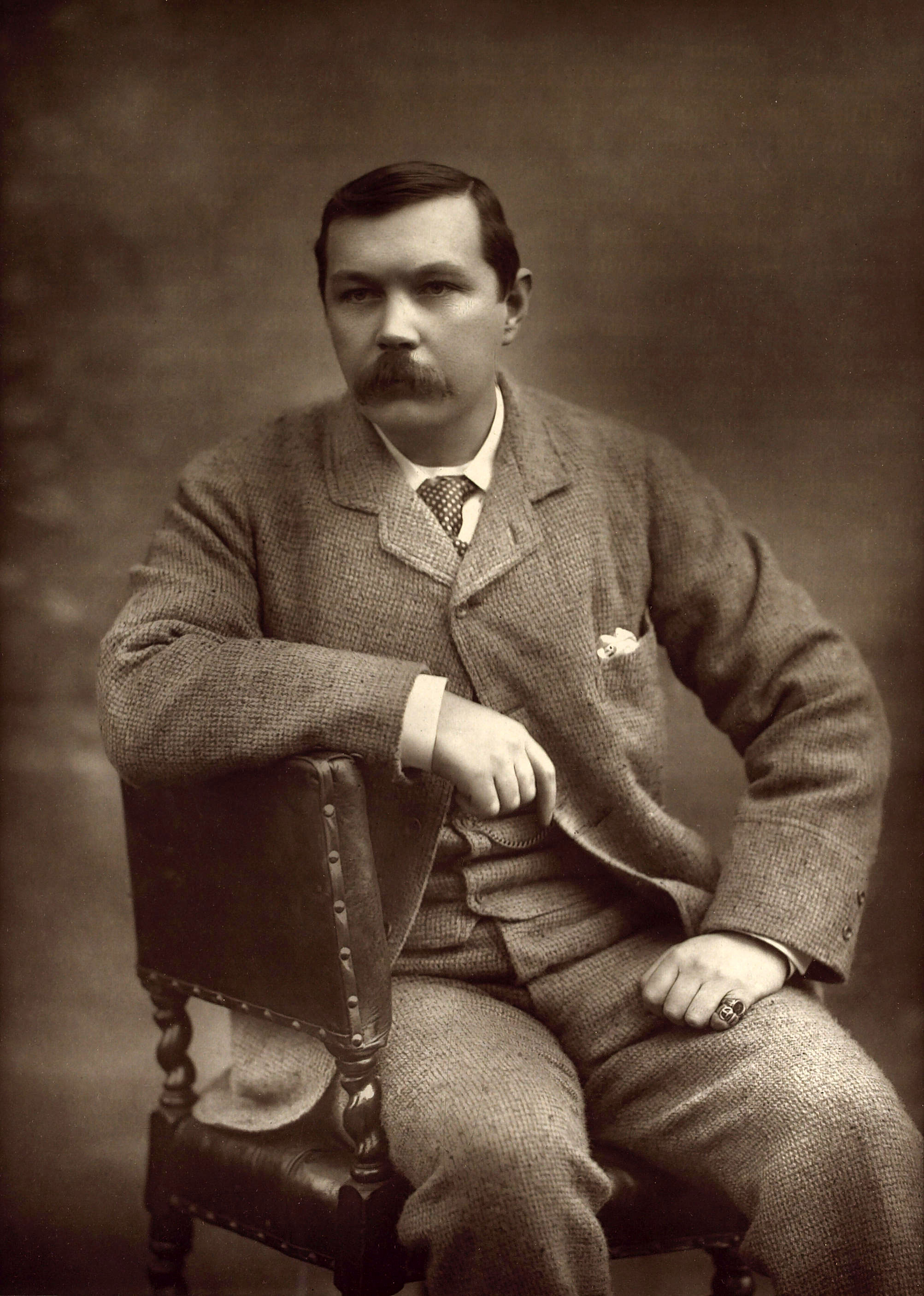
Arthur Conan Doyle

The Victorian period also saw authors with a Birmingham background produce fiction in a far broader range of genres. Arthur Conan Doyle, the creator of the fictional detective Sherlock Holmes, started his career as a writer in Birmingham. His first story "The Mystery of Sasassa Valley" was written and published in 1879 while he was working as a medical assistant in Aston, as was his second "The American's Tale", whose success led his editor to advise him to give up medicine and pursue a full-time literary career. Birmingham appears in Conan Doyle's early stories as Birchespool, and several of Conan Doyle's later Sherlock Holmes stories, including "The Adventure of the Stockbroker's Clerk" and "The Adventure of the Three Garridebs", have explicit Birmingham settings.

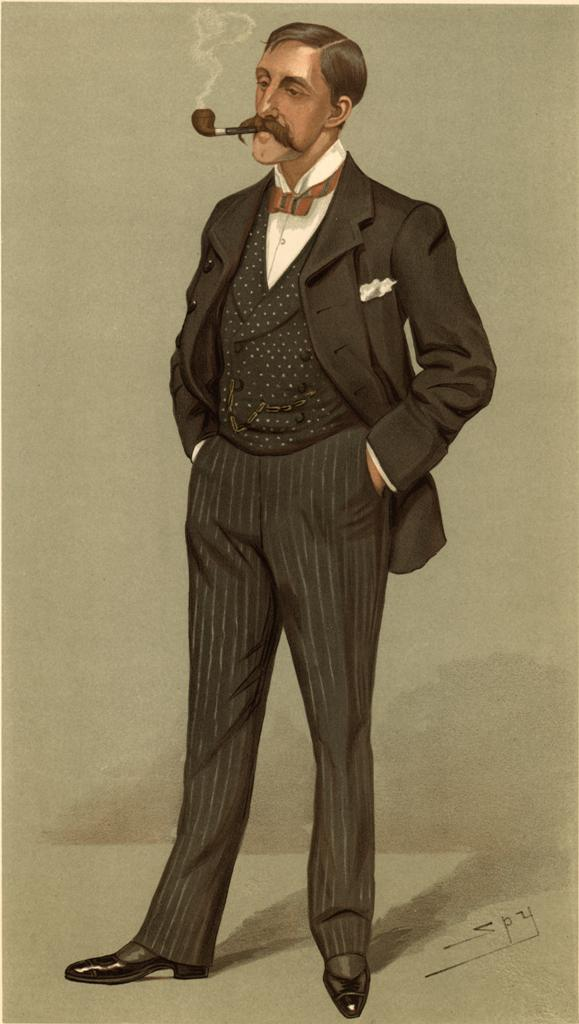
The adventure novelist Max Pemberton caricatured in Vanity Fair in 1897

Edwin Abbott Abbott, who worked for a period as a schoolmaster at Birmingham's King Edward's School, was the author of a wide range of writings dominated by his highly imaginative theological works. He is best known, however, for the classic early science fiction work Flatland: A Romance of Many Dimensions, which combined a satirical treatment of contemporary social class structures and gender roles, a deep expression of his own religious principles, and a speculative exploration of geometrical dimensions that anticipates Albert Einstein's General Theory of Relativity. Louisa Baldwin wrote poetry, two collections of children's stories and four novels for adults; but is most highly regarded for her gothic ghost stories, which were originally published in literary magazines but were collected together and published as The Shadow on the Blind by John Lane in 1895.

The imaginative adventure novels of Max Pemberton, the Edgbaston-born son of a Birmingham brass foundry owner, sold vastly well, from The Iron Pirate of 1893, a seafaring tale of ironclad buccaneers, to The Garden of Swords, an 1899 story of the Franco-Prussian War. This swashbuckling genre was also represented by the highly successful 1884 novel The Adventures of Maurice Drummore (Royal Marines) by Land and Sea, which claimed to be written by Linden Meadows and illustrated by F. Abell, though both in fact were pseudonyms of the Birmingham-born Charles Butler Greatrex.

The literary output of the Canadian-born author Grant Allen, who was brought up in Birmingham from the age of 13 and attended King Edward's School, was prodigious and varied even by Victorian standards. The Scottish critic Andrew Lang called him "the most versatile, beyond comparison, of any man in our age". Allen is best known for his best-selling but controversial 1895 novel The Woman Who Did, whose tragic plot combined support for free love with opposition to the institution of marriage, and whose success scandalised Victorian society. He is also noted for innovations in detective fiction, creating independent-minded female detectives modelled on the feminist ideal of the New Woman in Miss Cayley's Adventures; and for playing with the conventions of the crime genre in An African Millionaire, where the criminal is the hero, and the short story "The Great Ruby Robbery", where the culprit turns out to be the detective investigating the crime. Allen's incorporation of his own scientific preoccupations into novels such as the time travel-based The British Barbarians also made him an important early pioneer of science fiction. H. G. Wells later wrote to him, acknowledging that "this field of scientific romance with a philosophical element that I am trying to cultivate, properly belongs to you."

=== Oscott, Newman and the Catholic literary revival ===
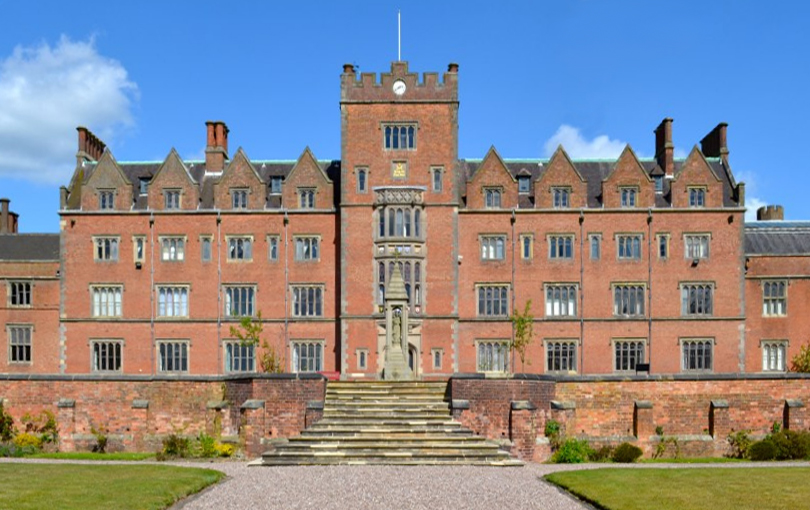
Oscott College

Although Victorian Birmingham was known as a stronghold of Protestant Nonconformism, St. Mary's College, Oscott in the north of the city lay at the heart of the mid-19th century revival of English Catholicism. The college built a reputation for Catholic literary scholarship after Thomas Walsh brought major collections of Renaissance scholarship including the Harvington Library and the Marini Library to the college in the 1830s, and in 1840 Nicholas Wiseman was appointed the college's rector. As a man of wide cultural achievements and a prolific author himself, Wiseman established the college as the favoured educational establishment of the country's Catholic social and intellectual elite, attracting many students who would become leading figures of the Catholic literary revival that would follow. William Barry, who was educated at Oscott as a boy and later returned as Professor of Theology, has been dubbed "the creator of the English Catholic novel". His provocative, controversial and often witty books varied from The New Antigone of 1887 – a cutting attack on socialism, atheism, free love and the cult of the New Woman – to the more overtly Catholic The Two Standards of 1898, and The Wizard's Knot of 1901 – a satire on the Celtic Revival. Alfred Austin, who studied at Oscott in the 1840s, succeeded Tennyson as Poet Laureate in 1896, though it was widely believed that this had more to do with his support for the Tory Party than for his literary merit. Lord Acton became the editor of the Catholic monthly The Rambler, a trusted advisor to William Gladstone and one of the leading liberal historians of the 19th century, best known for his editorship of the monumental Cambridge Modern History. The "first great modern philosopher of resistance to the state", he was the originator of the famous aphorism "Power tends to corrupt, and absolute power corrupts absolutely". An Oscott student under Wiseman, Acton later remarked on the international influence of the college at the time: "apart from Pekin, Oscott was the centre of the world".

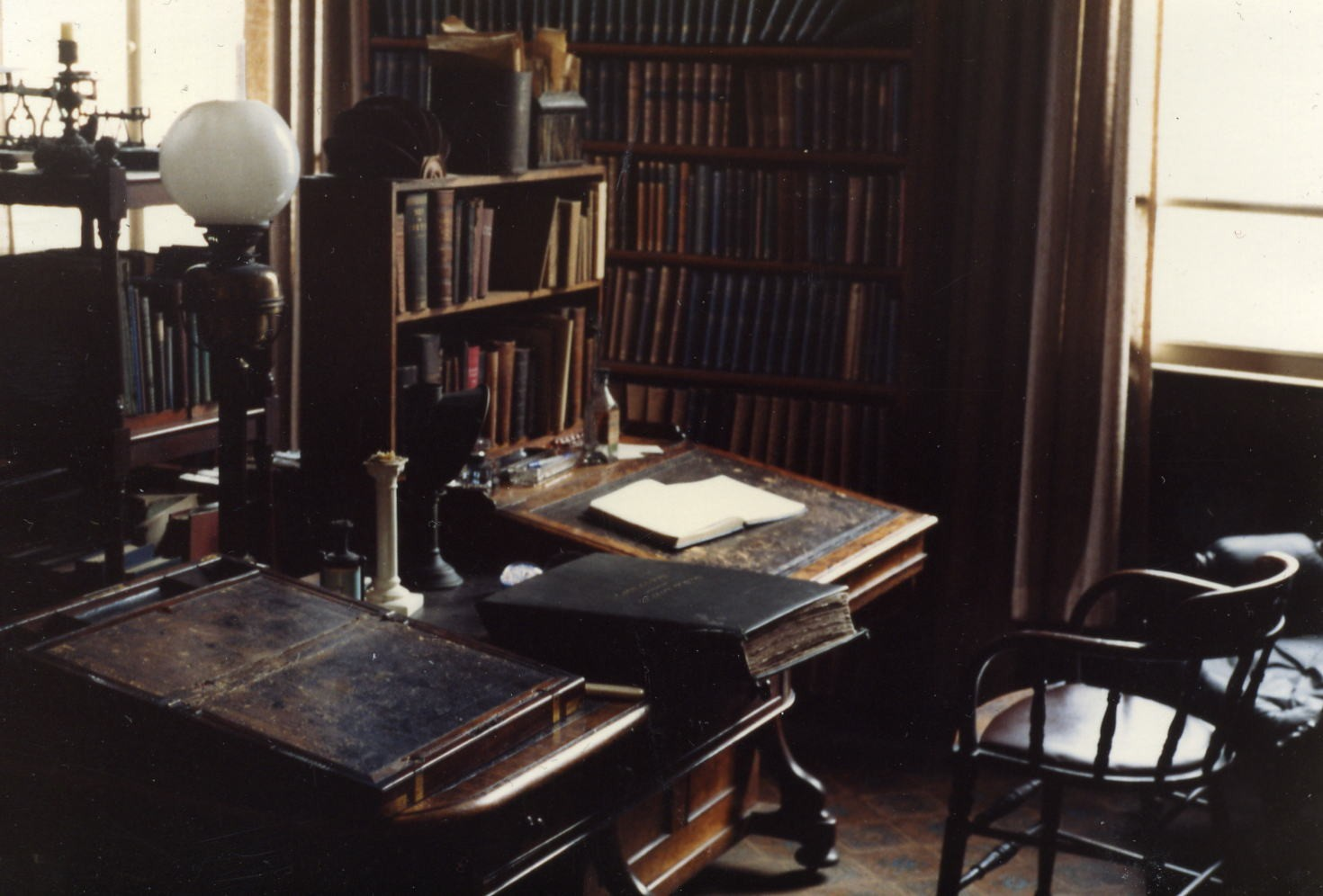
John Henry Newman's writing desk at the Birmingham Oratory

The most influential writer to be attracted to Oscott by Wiseman however was John Henry Newman, who was to become the outstanding Catholic literary figure of 19th century England and the major influence on the Catholic literary revival that was to follow. Newman moved to Birmingham shortly after his conversion from the Church of England in 1845, staying initially at Oscott before founding the Birmingham Oratory in Edgbaston in 1849. Living at the Oratory almost continuously until his death in 1890, his major works written in Birmingham include the autobiographical Apologia Pro Vita Sua, the novel Loss and Gain, his principal philosophical work Grammar of Assent, and the poem The Dream of Gerontius, later set to music by Edward Elgar. Under Newman the Oratory became the focus of a literary culture itself, attracting further Catholic writers of note. The poet Gerard Manley Hopkins taught at The Oratory School when he graduated and converted to Catholicism in 1867; it was here that he was to first develop the ideas of inscape and instress that were to prove central to his poetic practice. The novelist, poet and polemicist Hilaire Belloc came from a long line of Birmingham radicals – his mother was Bessie Rayner Parkes, his grandfather Joseph Parkes and his great-great-grandfather Joseph Priestley. He studied at the Oratory School from 1880 to 1886, and it was there he wrote his first published work Buzenval. The poet Edward Caswall lived at the Oratory from 1852 until his death in 1878, writing his major works Lyra Catholica and The Masque of Mary and other Poems.

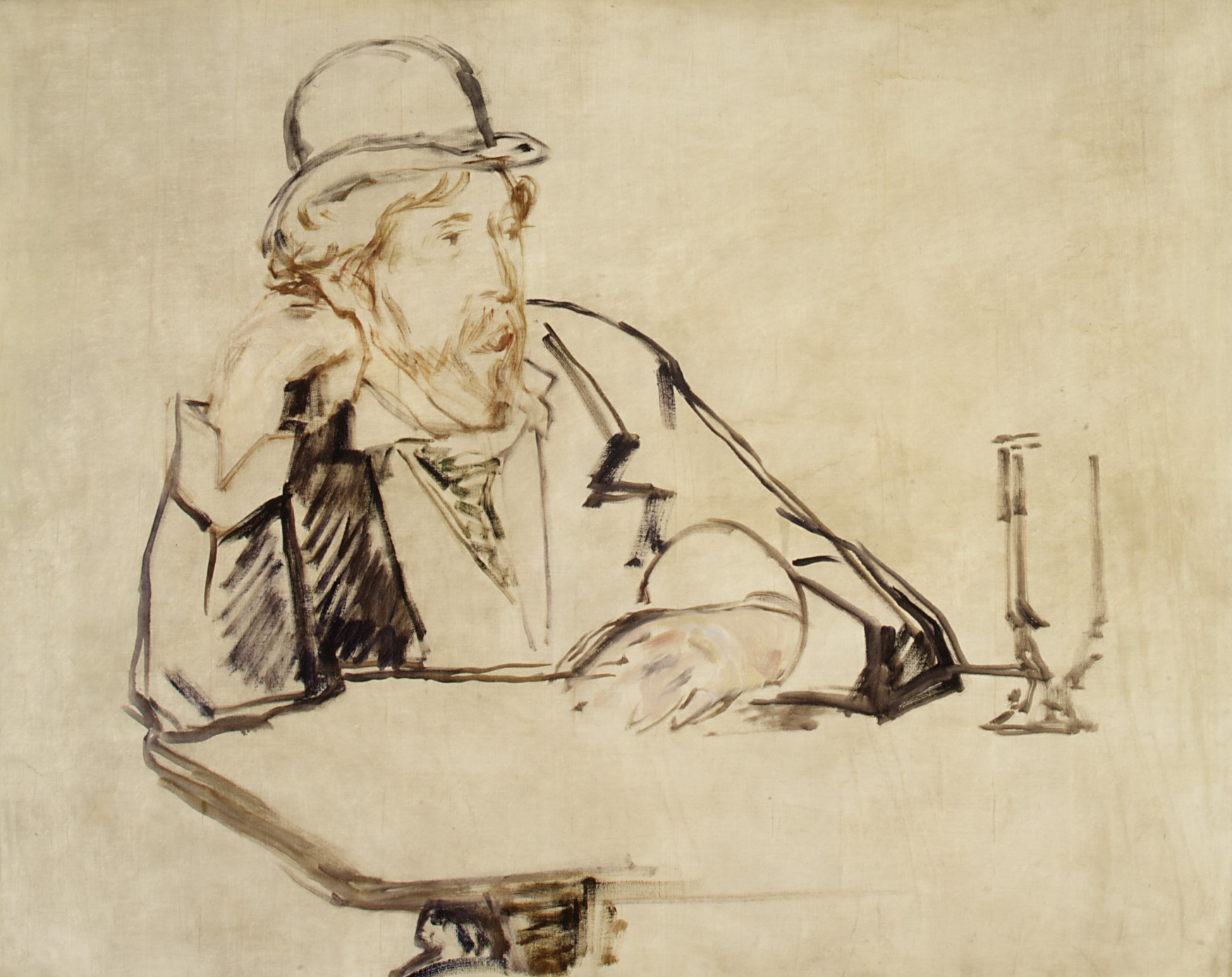
George Moore

Oscott also produced writers whose relationship with their Catholic background was ambiguous or actively hostile, and who – often writing from exile – were to become leading figures of the decadent literature of the close of the 19th century. The Irish-born George Moore was provoked into becoming a writer by his seven years at Oscott, which he called "a vile hole, a den of priests", turning to Byron and Shelley and noting that "it pleased me to read 'Queen Mab' and 'Cain' amid the priests and ignorance of a hateful Roman Catholic college". His early novels – particularly his 1885 work A Mummer's Wife, which dealt with alcoholism and the seedy underside of theatrical life – "opened up new possibilities for the novel in English", being the first to break away from the literary conventions of the Victorian style under the influence of the naturalism of Émile Zola. Moore constantly developed the form of his literary self-expression, with his later novels having a more fragmented, tapestry-like structure. He was a pivotal figure in the transition from Victorian to modern fiction, and a particular influence on James Joyce: the critic Graham Hough wrote that "neither the title nor the content of Joyce's Portrait of the Artist as a Young Man would have been quite the same in 1916 if it had not been for the prior existence of George Moore's Confessions of a Young Man in 1886." "The Dead", the final story of Joyce's Dubliners, was directly inspired by Moore's 1891 novel Vain Fortune. The eccentric novelist and artist Frederick Rolfe studied at Oscott from 1887, but left after it was decided he was an unsuitable candidate for the priesthood. Despite his open homosexuality he strongly felt himself to have a vocation for the priesthood throughout his lifetime. His most famous work was the decadent semi-autobiographical wish-fulfilment novel Hadrian the Seventh, published under his self-styled title Baron Corvo, in which he imagined himself as the Pope, but he also wrote short stories, poetry and essays. Wilfrid Scawen Blunt was inspired to become poet by the metaphysical teachings of Oscott's professor of philosophy during the 1850s, but embarked upon a succession of affairs during his subsequent career as a diplomat, becoming a self-confessed hedonist. He is best known for his erotic verse, and for his anti-imperialist opposition to British policy in Ireland, Egypt, Sudan and India. In 1914 a group of poets including W. B. Yeats, Ezra Pound, and Richard Aldington entertained Blunt to a lunch of roast peacock, paying tribute to him as the first poet to relate poetry to real life. Pound wrote of Blunt's "unconquered flame", though Yeats was more ambivalent, confiding in T. Sturge Moore that "only a small part of his work is good but that is exceedingly fine".

=== 19th century poetry and drama ===
Although writing and, particularly, playwrighting were still not considered respectable activities for women throughout much of the period, 19th century Birmingham featured a notable concentration women poets and dramatists. Constance Naden, who was born in Edgbaston and lived most of her life in Birmingham, published two well-received volumes of poetry in the 1880s while studying science at Mason Science College. She has been celebrated as the foremost female poet to hail from Birmingham. Sarah Anne Curzon was born and educated in Birmingham, where she began writing and contributing essays and fiction to periodicals at an early age.

"At any one time there must be five or six supremely intelligent people on the earth," The New Yorker poetry editor Howard Moss wrote shortly after Auden's death, "Auden was one of them". Auden's family roots were strongly tied to the West Midlands and he grew up from the age of six months in the Birmingham area, first in Solihull and then in Harborne, the son of George Augustus Auden, the Schools Medical Officer for Birmingham City Council. Auden's early poetry carried strong social, political and economic overtones, reflecting an interest in the thought of Marx and Freud inherited from his father, but his later work was characterised by a greater interest in religious and spiritual issues. The huge range of form, style and subject exhibited by his work, the variety of its outlook and its accessibility and emotional directness initially provoked scepticism amongst modernist critics who placed greater value on consistency and objectivity, but his reputation grew as modernist orthodoxy waned, and he has since increasingly come to be viewed as the first writer of the postmodern era. By 2011 the American critic Edward Mendelson could write: "at the start of the twenty-first century Auden's stature had reached the point where many readers thought it not implausible to judge his work the greatest body of poetry in English of the previous hundred years or more".

Birmingham remained Auden's principal home for three decades, until he left for the United States in 1939 (he was noted for going shopping for cigarettes in Harborne in his dressing gown) and he identified with the city throughout his lifetime. Birmingham also featured widely in his work. "As I Walked Out One Evening", one of his best-known early poems, moves a ballad constructed from a series of allusions to folksong and popular culture into the decidedly 20th century context of Bristol Street in Birmingham City Centre. In "Letter to Lord Byron" he rejects the Lake District idyll of William Wordsworth in favour of a decisive if irony-tinged commitment to the contemporary urban landscape of the Midlands, declaring "Clearer the Scafell Pike, my heart has stamped on / The view from Birmingham to Wolverhampton"; before continuing "Tramlines and slagheaps, pieces of machinery / That was, and still is, my ideal scenery". The wider influence of the city on Auden's outlook and work was noted in 1945 by the American critic Edmund Wilson who observed that Auden "in fundamental ways ... doesn't belong in that London literary world – he's more vigorous and more advanced. With his Birmingham background ... he is in some ways more like an American. He is really extremely tough – cares nothing about property or money, popularity or social prestige-does everything on his own and alone."

Auden lay at the forefront of the Auden Group that dominated English poetry of the 1930s and also included the Birmingham-born Rex Warner and the Birmingham-based Louis MacNeice, who had moved to the city from Oxford in 1930 to teach classics at the University of Birmingham. MacNeice's experience of Birmingham's urbanity lay behind the major advances in his poetry in the early 1930s, as his work increasingly reflected the city with the sympathetic detachment that was to become his distinctive poetic voice. His 1935 collection Poems established him as one of the leading new poets of the time, being described by Cecil Day-Lewis as "in some ways the most interesting of the poetical work produced in the last two years" – a particularly significant comparison for a period that included major publications by T. S. Eliot, Auden, Stephen Spender and Day-Lewis himself. As well as marking a high point in his poetic practice, MacNeice's period in Birmingham was one of domestic happiness, abruptly shattered in 1934 when his wife left him and his son to move to the United States with an American football player. In response MacNeice "began to go out a great deal and discovered Birmingham. Discovered that the students were human; discovered that Birmingham had its own writers and artists who were free of the London trade-mark." With his mentor E. R. Dodds leaving the city, however, he came to feel increasingly isolated and in 1936 accepted a lectureship at Bedford College, London.

Early 20th century Birmingham also featured several notable poets who were not associated with the Auden circle. John Drinkwater was one of the originators of the Georgian Poetry movement in 1912, and one of only five poets whose work was to feature in all of the Georgian Poetry anthologies. Later editions of the series also included the work of the Halesowen-born, Birmingham-educated writer Francis Brett Young. Charles Madge, later the founder of Mass-Observation and Professor of Sociology at Birmingham University, was a leading Surrealist poet during the 1930s. His poetry featured regularly in the London Bulletin, and his 1933 article "Surrealism for the English" advocated that English surrealist poets would need to combine knowledge of "the philosophical position of the French surrealists" with "a knowledge of their own language and literature" two or three years before most people in England had even heard of the movement. Henry Treece, who was born in Wednesbury and educated at the University of Birmingham, led the neo-romantic reaction against Auden Group in the late 1930s and 1940s as one of the founders of the New Apocalyptics, describing the movement in his 1946 work How I See Apocalypse: "In my definition, the writer who senses the chaos, the turbulence, the laughter and the tears, the order and the peace of the world in its entirety, is an Apocalyptic writer. His utterance will be prophetic, for he is observing things which less sensitive men may have not yet come to notice; and as his words are prophetic, they will tend to be incantatory, and so musical."

=== Highfield and the Birmingham Group ===
W. H. Auden and Louis MacNeice also formed part of the remarkable wider group of writers and artists that formed in Birmingham in the 1930s around the Edgbaston home of the poet and classicist E. R. Dodds; the Birmingham Film Society; and Highfield, the rambling Selly Park home of the economist Philip Sargeant Florence and his wife, the journalist and radical Lella Secor Florence. United by their broadly left wing views, this group included a diverse range of writers. The Erdington-born poet and dramatist Henry Reed became involved as an undergraduate studying under MacNeice, later becoming well known for "The Naming of Parts" – one of the best-known poems of the Second World War – and establishing a reputation as a noted radio dramatist. Another radio dramatist associated with the group through MacNeice was Lozells-born R. D. Smith, who later married the novelist Olivia Manning. The architectural writer and critic Nikolaus Pevsner first visited Highfield in 1933 as a refugee from Nazi Germany. From 1934 he lived at the Ladywood home of Francesca Wilson, which housed a varied group of international political refugees, while he conducted the study at the University of Birmingham for Sargeant Florence that led to the publication of Pioneers of the Modern Movement in 1936 and An Inquiry into Industrial Art in England in 1937: pivotal works in the study of modern design. Also living at Duchess Road was the emigre Russian linguist, classicist and cultural critic Nicholas Bachtin, whom Wilson had met in Paris in 1928 and who was a former member of the "Bakhtin Circle" that had formed in Russia around his brother Mikhail Bakhtin. The literary critic and poet William Empson took refuge at Highfield after his expulsion from Cambridge, living in the city for 6 months and unsuccessfully seeking a post at the university. George Thomson associated with the group after his move to Birmingham in 1937. A classical scholar and Marxist philosopher, he wrote on an extraordinarily wide range of subjects – "kinship, poetry, land tenure, textual criticism, word order, linguistics, religion, Marxism, Thomas Hardy, communist political strategy, and much else".

The philosopher Ludwig Wittgenstein was also closely associated with the Highfield group: although living in Cambridge he found Birmingham's intellectual culture more outward-looking and made the city the focus of his primary social circle, being particularly close to Thomson and Bachtin, whom he visited frequently. He had had earlier links with Birmingham, visiting the city regularly in the years leading up to World War I to stay with his friend David Pinsent in Selly Park. It was in Paradise Street opposite Birmingham Town Hall in 1913 that Wittgenstein had dictated the typescript that would become Notes on Logic, his first philosophical work.

Also connected with Highfield were Walter Allen and John Hampson, who formed a link to the separate group of novelists and short story writers known as the Birmingham Group, which formed in 1935 after the American critic Edward O'Brien announced of "a new group of writers emerging in the Midlands, chiefly in and near Birmingham". Despite their reputation as working class novelists, the Birmingham Group had the varied social backgrounds characteristic of highly socially mobile Birmingham. John Hampson was born into a prosperous middle-class family impoverished by the collapse of the family business, living a chequered existence including spending time imprisoned in Wormwood Scrubs for book theft. His first published novel Saturday Night at the Greyhound was set in a pub in Derbyshire but featured flashbacks to the protagonists' Birmingham backgrounds, proving an unexpected success for the Hogarth Press in 1931 and bringing Hampson fame and literary friendships with Leonard and Virginia Woolf, William Plomer, John Lehmann and E. M. Forster. The Woolfs published Hampson's second novel O Providence – a bleaker semi-autobiographical story of the descent into poverty of a boy born into luxury in Five Ways, written in a sparse, angular style of short unconnected sentences – but they baulked at the explicit homosexual content of Go Seek a Stranger, the stylistically sophisticated portrait of the dilemmas facing a Birmingham-born homosexual man in the 1930s that is considered Hampson's finest work. Hampson published two further Birmingham-set works: 1936's Family Curse and the 1939 short story Good Luck. Walter Allen was born the son of a silversmith in Lozells, but went on to study at the University of Birmingham, becoming a friend of Louis MacNeice and John Hampson while an undergraduate. He established himself as a successful author in the late 1930s with a series of realist novels – including Innocence is Drowned of 1938, Blind Man's Ditch of 1939 and Living Space of 1940 – set in Birmingham and depicting the political and social tensions of working class life. After the war he became well known as a journalist and critic and in 1959 wrote All in a Lifetime, also set in Birmingham and his most highly regarded novel.

The most authentically working class of the Birmingham Group authors was Leslie Halward, who was born over a butchers shop in Selly Oak and worked as a plasterer and toolmaker. Halward's major works were his short stories, collected in the two anthologies To Tea on Sundays and The Money's Alright and Other Stories, which captured an ambience "peculiarly appropriate to Birmingham" and were commended by E. M. Forster for their "good humour, the sureness and lightness of touch, the absence of any social moral" In contrast to Halward's origins Peter Chamberlain was the grandson of Birmingham architect J. H. Chamberlain and of the city's first Lord Mayor James Smith. He was born in Edgbaston and educated at the private Clifton College. A notable motorcycle journalist and writer of short stories for the New Statesman, his novel Sing Holiday is a tale of motor racing set in Birmingham and the Isle of Man. Two further members of the group – Walter Brierley and Hedley Carter – were from Derbyshire and had few connections with Birmingham, attending meetings of the group irregularly.

Despite their variety of style, purpose and genre, the writers of 1930s Birmingham from Auden through Highfield to the Birmingham Group shared some distinctive characteristics – particularly their high level of political engagement and their use of cinematic narrative techniques such as montage in their writing. These were to form their greatest collective influence as, passed on through Hampson, Auden and MacNeice, they were to be adopted by Virginia Woolf and through her much of 1930s literary London.

=== Early 20th century novelists ===
The best-known early to mid 20th century novelist associated with Birmingham was J. R. R. Tolkien, whose books The Hobbit and The Lord of the Rings are two of the world's four best-selling books of all time, with over 100 million and over 150 million copies in print respectively. Although Tolkien was born in Bloemfontein in South Africa, he later called this a "fallacious fact" claiming that he "happened to be born there by accident". Both of his parents were from Birmingham and he was brought up in the city from the age of three, living in Sarehole – an area of Hall Green then on the semi-rural southern edge of the city – and in Moseley, Kings Heath, Edgbaston and Rednal. Tolkien later remembered his time in Hall Green in particular as "the longest-seeming and most formative part of my life" and numerous connections have been made between his Birmingham upbringing and features of his work: Sarehole Mill has been seen as the inspiration for the "Great Mill" of The Hobbit; Moseley Bog as the basis of the "Old Forest" of Book One of The Lord of the Rings; and the gothic brick towers of Perrott's Folly and Edgbaston Waterworks – dominating the skyline from the bedroom window of Tolkien's home in Stirling Street, Edgbaston – as the inspiration for "The Two Towers" of Book Two of The Lord of the Rings.

The relationship between Birmingham and Tolkien's universe is a broader one, however. Tolkien's cultural outlook was deeply influenced by the Arts and Crafts Movement, whose origins lay with the Birmingham Set of the 1850s and of which Birmingham was a key hub. He was unambiguous that The Shire of the Lord of the Rings was based on a pre-industrial Birmingham area, claiming "I lived, for my early years, in the Shire, in a pre-mechanical age", and his earliest tales of Middle Earth explicitly related it to the wider West Midlands region. The language that underlies his imaginary worlds was also strongly tied to the Birmingham area: "I am a West-midlander by blood" he wrote to W. H. Auden in 1955, "and took to early west-midland Middle English as a known tongue as soon as I set eyes on it." Tolkien's entire legendarium has been seen both as a lament for the lost world of his childhood, and as an imaginary reconstruction of the mythology of the rural Forest of Arden landscape that underlay the West Midlands' advancing modernity.

Another novelist to take inspiration from the landscape of the early 20th century West Midlands was Francis Brett Young. Born just west of Birmingham in Halesowen, Young was educated in Sutton Coldfield, at Epsom in Surrey and at the University of Birmingham before training as a doctor in the city; but he only started writing the stories of Midlands life that were to make his name after leaving Birmingham in 1907. His first published novel was Undergrowth of 1913, but it was not until the late 1920s that he became firmly established as a best-selling writer with the resounding commercial success of 1927's Portrait of Clare, which won the James Tait Black Memorial Prize and was later being adapted into a film; and 1928's My Brother Jonathan, also made into a film and later serialised for BBC Television. 27 of Young's novels – from Undergrowth of 1913 to Wistanslow of 1956 – are set in "North Bromwich", a historically and geographically detailed portrayal of Birmingham and its suburbs that collectively forms the city's most extensive fictional representation.

Like Tolkien, Young saw Birmingham's man-made urbanity and its mechanically driven economy as despoiling influences on the natural beauty and simple lifestyle of the rural Midlands, but other writers took a less nostalgia-driven approach. Hardware: a novel in four books was written in 1914 and is recognised as the major work of the Birmingham-educated author Kineton Parkes. It is set in the Midlands town of "Metlingham", which it depicts in prodigious detail and which is very obviously based on Birmingham. Parkes, like Tolkien, was influenced by the Arts and Crafts Movement but his writing also reflected the urbanist values of the Civic Gospel ideology with which the movement in Birmingham was closely associated, concluding "at heart Metlingham was sound: the City and its Council… the life of the City and of its suburbs…". The structure of Hardware was also innovative and progressive, reflecting the fragmentation of urban life through its division into 4 books, 40 chapters and nearly 300 sections in a form that anticipated James Joyce's later work Ulysses.

The most influential modernist novelist of early 20th century Birmingham however was Henry Green, whose oblique approach to writing – "displacing the centrality of plot, undermining the integrity of character, silencing the narrative voice and questioning the authenticity of the self" – has seen him described by the critic Edward Stokes as "one of the most elusive, tantalizing and enigmatic of novelists", though the novelist Sebastian Faulks has also written that Green's writing brings "a pleasure more intense, more original, more rewarding than that offered by any of his contemporaries". Green's 1929 novel Living – set in a Birmingham foundry – was one of the earliest of the novels of working class life that would become common during the 1930s. It was more notable, however, for its experimental prose style, defamiliarised through the avoidance of the use of the articles "the" and "a", and the removal of adjectives from descriptive passages, both as a reflection of the local accent and as a conscious rejection of the residual romanticism of the psychological realist and stream of consciousness styles of James Joyce and Virginia Woolf.

=== Genre fiction ===
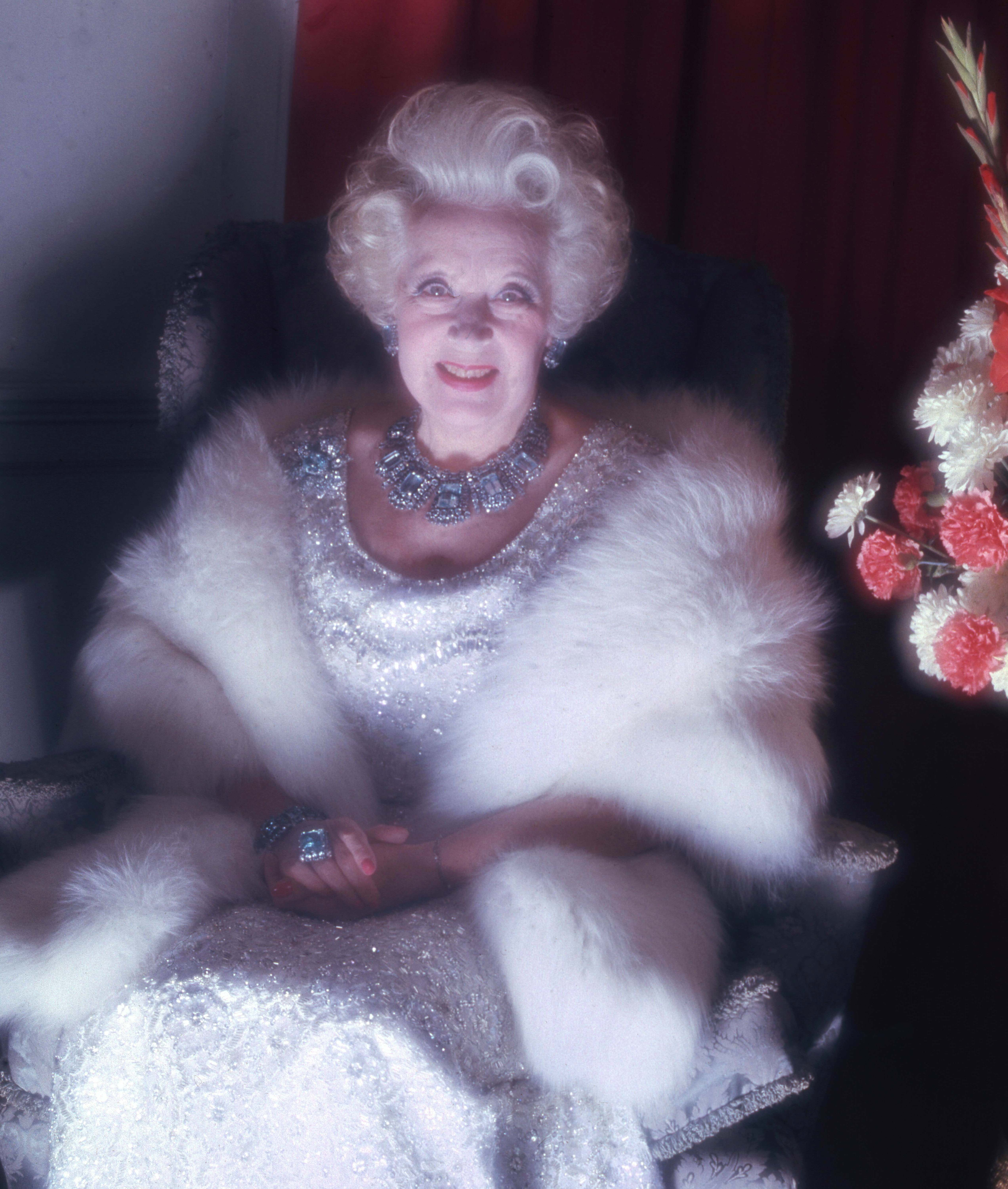
Barbara Cartland

The romantic novelist Barbara Cartland, who was born in Edgbaston in 1901, was cited by the Guinness Book of Records at the time of her death as the world's bestselling living author, with over 700 books to her name having sold 900 million copies. Also notable as a romantic novelist was Jeffery Farnol, who was born in Aston in 1878 and first found work as a Birmingham brass-founder. He wrote over 40 novels that combined regency romance with swashbuckling adventure, becoming an influence on George MacDonald Fraser, Jack Vance and Georgette Heyer, and forming "a link between the major writers of the 19th century and the popular romancers of the present".

- Charles Talbut Onions: Birmingham born and educated, he was a prominent etymologist who worked on the Oxford English Dictionary and was general editor of its shorter version.
- Sax Rohmer, author of the Fu Manchu thrillers, was the pseudonym of Arthur Henry Ward, who was born in Birmingham but pursued his writing career in London and then New York.

== Post-war and contemporary literature ==
=== Literary fiction ===
The University of Birmingham continued as one of the main points of focus for the city's literary culture in the post-war era. The novelist and critic Anthony Burgess worked in the university's extramural department between 1946 and 1950. Of longer lasting influence on Birmingham literature were David Lodge and Malcolm Bradbury – the two leading late-20th century practitioners of the campus novel – who both joined the staff of the English Department in the early 1960s, collaborating on the 1963 satirical revue Between these Four Walls for the Birmingham Repertory Theatre and becoming lifelong friends. Bradbury wrote his second novel Stepping Westward in the city but moved to the University of East Anglia in 1965, while Lodge remained in Birmingham, retiring in 1987 to concentrate on writing. Many of Lodge's novels are set in Rummidge, "an imaginary city ... which occupies, for the purposes of fiction, the space where Birmingham is to be found on maps of the so-called real world". These include Nice Work, described by Arthur Marwick as "the novel of life in Thatcherite Britain", and the Booker Prize shortlisted Small World: An Academic Romance. Lodge's novels use parody and pastiche, formal experiments such as chapters composed entirely of newspaper clippings, and ironic allusions to other literary genres, to examine moral dilemmas and document changes in British society.

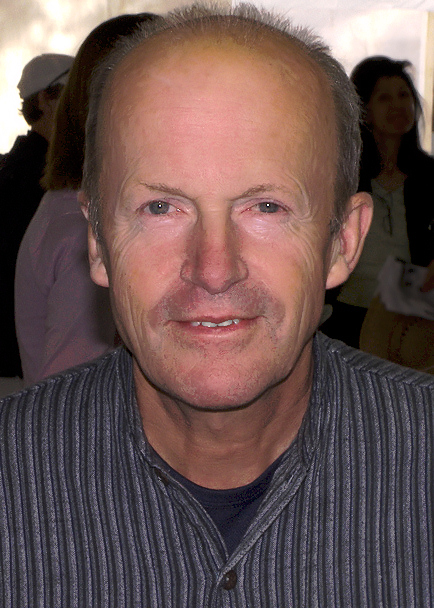
Jim Crace

Jim Crace moved to Birmingham in 1965 to study at what is now Birmingham City University, where his contemporaries included the novelist and journalist Gordon Burn, whose later writing blurred the lines between fact and fiction to examine the trauma, spectacle and dysfunction of contemporary celebrity, and new gothic psychological novelist Patrick McGrath. Crace wrote short stories from the early 1970s and published his first novel Continent in 1986. Still living in Moseley in the south of the city, his reputation unusually combines both a broad popular readership and substantial acclaim among critics and academics. His work sits outside the social realist mainstream of English novelists, having more in common with European and South American authors such as Italo Calvino, Vladimir Nabokov, Franz Kafka, W. G. Sebald, Jorge Luis Borges or Gabriel García Márquez. Although his novels have settings as diverse as the Bronze Age, the Judaean Desert in the time of Christ, an 1830s Cornish fishing village and an invented eighth continent, Crace claims that the subject of all of his books is present-day Birmingham, seen through "some idea or inspiration that would allow me to take the subject and dislocate it to another place and time to see if it cracks, if it bends."

Jonathan Coe – described by Nick Hornby as "the best English novelist of his generation" – was born and raised in Lickey on the southern edge of Birmingham and educated at King Edward's School, where he wrote his first novel at the age of 15. Coe's largely satirical novels combine the techniques of postmodern fiction with a focus on the more traditional values of humour and plot. His novel The Rotters' Club was set in Birmingham and satirised the city's society in the 1970s, with its sequel The Closed Circle taking a similar approach to Birmingham society of the first decade of the 21st century. The novelist Susan Fletcher, who was born in Birmingham in 1979, won both the Betty Trask Prize and the Whitbread First Novel Award for her 2004 debut novel Eve Green, which used the forced relocation of an 8-year-old girl from Birmingham to rural Wales to explore themes of loss, loneliness and guilt.

Another focus of literary culture within Birmingham is the Tindal Street Press, which grew out of a Balsall Heath-based group of writers in 1998. The city's most notable publisher of literary fiction, Tindal Street Press has built a remarkable record of bringing West Midlands writers to wider attention: of the 48 titles published in its first ten years, 12 were nominated for one or more national or international prizes. Astonishing Splashes of Colour was the first novel by Quinton-based music teacher Clare Morrall. Set in Birmingham and featuring a lead character with synesthesia, it was shortlisted for the Booker Prize in 2003, and subsequently translated into twelve languages, becoming Tindal Street's bestselling title. The Birmingham area also provides settings for several of Morrall's subsequent novels, including 2008's The Language of Others , and 2012's The Roundabout Man. In 2007 Tindal Street published What Was Lost, the debut novel by Hall Green shopworker Catherine O'Flynn. Part ghost story and part mystery, it used the story of the disappearance of a 10-year-old girl from a Birmingham shopping centre to illustrate the changes in an industrial community over two decades, being nominated for both the Booker Prize and the Orange Prize for Fiction in 2007, and winning the first novel award at the 2007 Costa Book Awards. O'Flynn's 2010 second novel The News Where You Are led Fay Weldon to describe her as the "J. G. Ballard of Birmingham", noting how O'Flynn "deals with her particular city, finding poetry and meaning where others see merely boredom and dereliction ... as if the lonely dead of the city's past and present were determined to be heard". Other local writers who've seen notable success with Tindal Street include the Edgbaston-based social worker Gaynor Arnold and the Black Country writers Raphael Selbourne and Anthony Cartwright. The impact of Tindal Street on promoting the city's writers was summed up by The Observer in 2008: "The company has an ability to mine local talent, even when their authors' biographies don't ooze glamour ... There are aspiring authors all over the country writing stories between night shifts, but only in Birmingham, it seems, does anyone pay attention."

=== Crime fiction, thrillers and science fiction ===
John Wyndham, who was born to a Birmingham family in Knowle to the south-east of the city and brought up in Edgbaston, was the most significant single writer in the post-war rebirth of science fiction in Britain, becoming the founding figure of a school of writers that would include John Christopher, Charles Eric Maine, J. G. Ballard, and Christopher Priest. 1951's The Day of the Triffids marked the first of a series of novels – including The Chrysalids, The Midwich Cuckoos and Chocky – that "with a skilful anatomy, laid bare the abyss beneath the comfortable lives of his audience". Wyndham is one of the few science fiction writers to have successfully crossed over to mainstream appeal, with his post-apocalyptic novels capturing the British mood of unease in the 1950s and making him one of the most important British writers of the early post-war era.

Ian Watson was one of the leading British figures of the New Wave science fiction that emerged in the late 1960s and early 1970s. Watson wrote highly imaginative narratives that explored the relationships between consciousness, language, and reality and taught one of the United Kingdom's first academic courses in science fiction at Birmingham Polytechnic. His first novel, The Embedding of 1973, remains his most respected single title and formed a searching exploration of the Whorfian hypothesis and the nature of communication through language, with his many subsequent novels and over 170 short stories also often taking the form of thought experiments on the nature of perception. The science fiction critic David Pringle wrote that "British SF in the 1970s belonged to Ian Watson" with the author Brian Stableford concluding that "There is no other writer in the field who provides such a bold challenge to the imagination". Also influential within the New Wave was Birmingham-born Barrington J. Bayley, whose work focused on metaphysical and absurdist themes and was to prove influential on M. John Harrison, Iain M. Banks, William Gibson and Bruce Sterling.

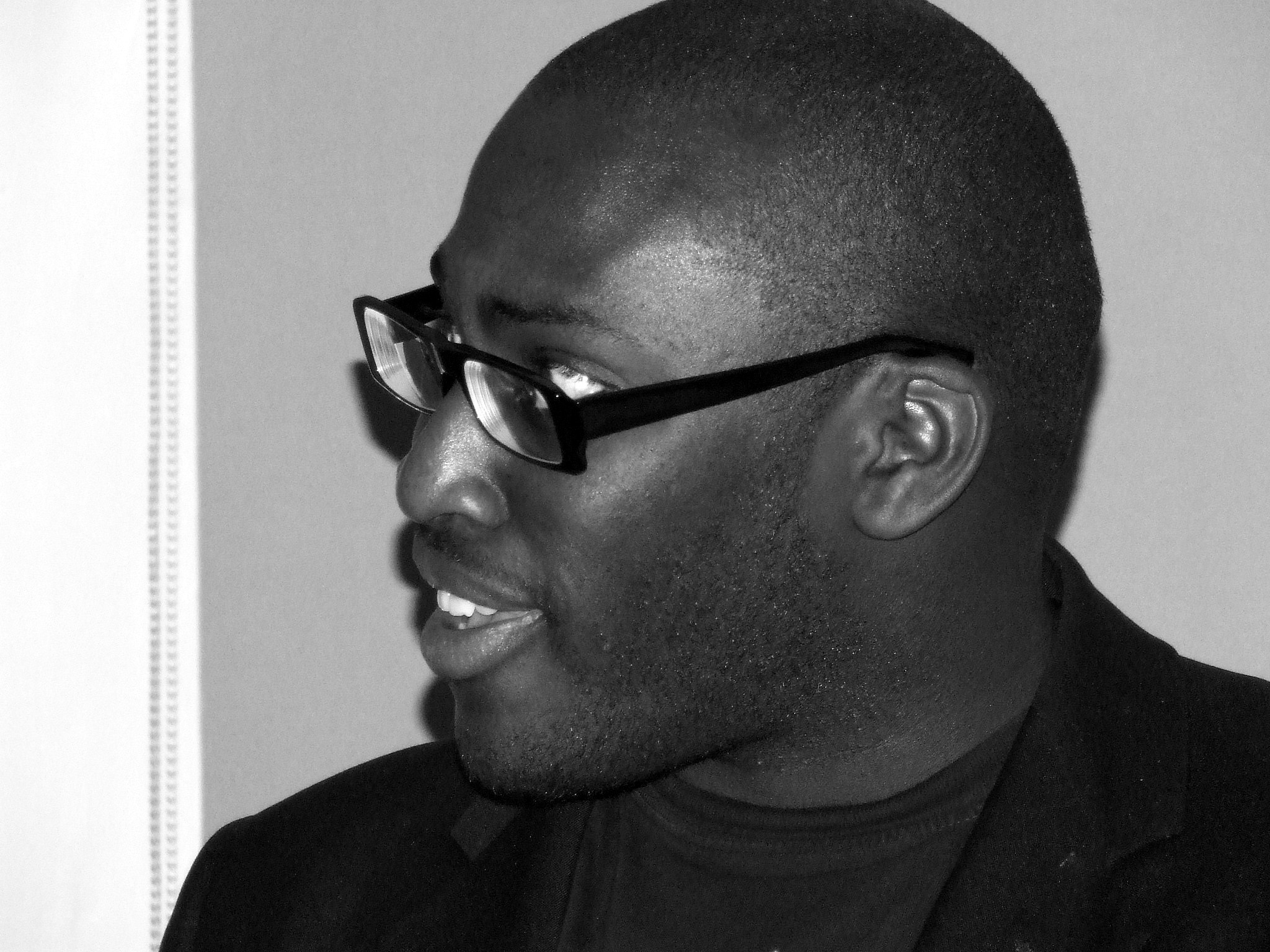
Mike Gayle

Harborne-based Mike Gayle is one of the key exemplars of lad lit, a genre of fiction that developed in the 1990s exploring "unheroic" tales of masculinity. Many of his books have Birmingham settings, including Turning Thirty of 2000, telling the story of its hero's return from New York City to Kings Heath, and His 'n' Hers of 2004, a tale of students in Selly Oak. Also exploring the life of the contemporary urban male is the fiction of John McCabe, who combines a career as a best-selling novelist with one as a geneticist. His 1998 debut novel Stickleback used Birmingham's Number 11 Outer Circle bus route as a metaphor for unproductive routine and futility.

- Maureen Carter's Bev Morriss crime novels are set in present-day Birmingham.
- Judith Cutler's crime novels are set in present-day Birmingham.
- W.V. Awdry wrote his first Thomas the Tank Engine in Kings Norton and remained in the city until 1965.

=== Poetry ===
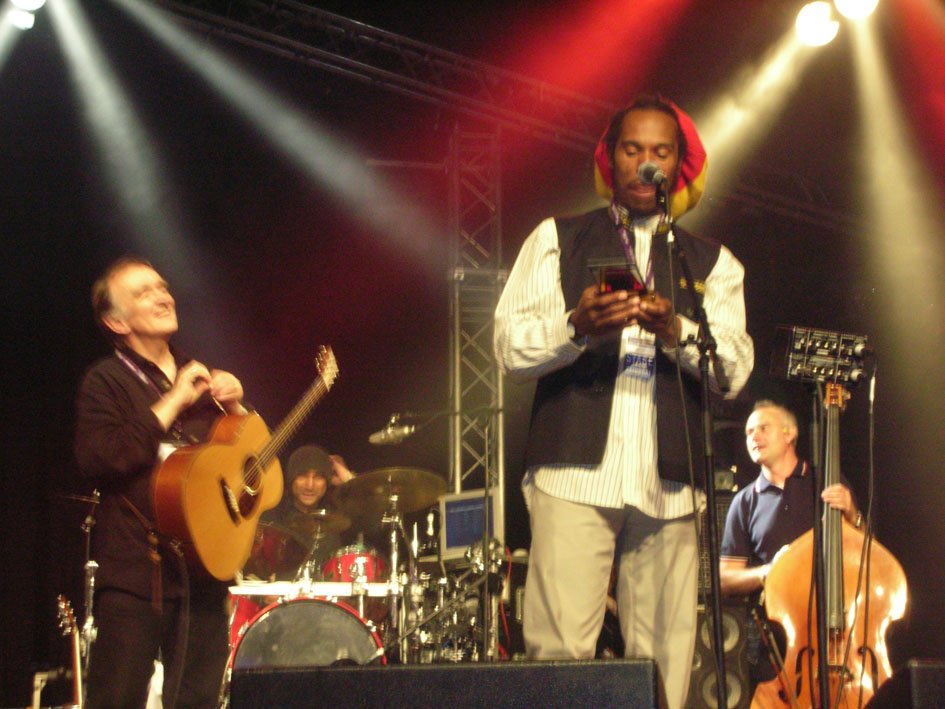
Benjamin Zephaniah

- D. J. Enright (born in Leamington Spa) was an Extramural Tutor at Birmingham University between 1950 and 1953. There are references to the city and Black Country in his early poetry.
- Edward Lowbury came to work as a microbiologist at Birmingham Accident Hospital in 1949. Between then and his departure from the city in 2001 he wrote his most distinguished poetry, as well as the topographical collection Birmingham! Birmingham!
- Lenrie Peters, the Gambian surgeon and poet, worked at Birmingham Accident Hospital in the early 1960s, during which his early poetry and one novel were written.
- Enoch Powell was born and raised in Birmingham, and was a poet as well as a politician.
- Gavin Bantock, born in Barnt Green in 1939 and educated at King's Norton Boys' School and Birmingham Theatre School. He has lived in Japan since 1969.
- Roshan Doug became the fifth Birmingham Poet Laureate in October 2000.
- Julie Boden became the seventh Birmingham Poet Laureate in October 2002.
- Roy Fisher was born, educated and taught in Birmingham, before moving to the Department of American Studies at Keele University in 1971. Also a poet, his first significant work was City, an evocation of Birmingham. Other local references occur in the "Handsworth Liberties" sequence.
- Roi Kwabena (1956–2008) lived continuously in the city from 1995 and was its sixth Birmingham Poet Laureate (2001–02). He was also a story-teller, drummer and cultural ambassador.
- Femi Oyebode, professor of psychiatry at the Queen Elizabeth Psychiatric Hospital, has published seven poetry volumes in Nigeria.
- Nick Toczek, performance poet and children's writer, studied industrial metallurgy at Birmingham University between 1969 and 1972 and lived in the city again between 1974 and 1979, when he began publishing poetry and prose.
- Benjamin Zephaniah was a black dub poet from Handsworth who wrote about prejudice, poverty and injustice.

=== Non fiction ===
Kenneth Tynan – described by Daily Telegraph drama critic Charles Spencer as "undoubtedly the greatest dramatic critic of the 20th century, probably the greatest since Hazlitt" – was born in Hall Green in South Birmingham and educated at King Edward's School.

Bruce Chatwin was born in Sheffield into a long line of "Birmingham worthies" and brought up in the Birmingham area in West Heath, Edgbaston and Tanworth in Arden. His 1977 book In Patagonia effectively redefined the genre of travel literature and was described by the travel writer William Dalrymple in 2011 as "probably the most influential travel book written since the war". Nicholas Shakespeare called Chatwin's work "the most glamorous example of a genre in which so-called 'travel writing' began to embrace a wider range: autobiography, philosophy, history, belles lettres, romantic fiction".

- Leonard Cottrell was a Brummie author, archaeologist, commentator, and producer for the British Broadcasting Corporation. He also worked as a war correspondent for the Royal Air Force, and later wrote many work on ancient history became the editor of the Concise Encyclopaedia of Archaeology (1965).

== See also ==
- List of libraries in Birmingham, West Midlands

== Bibliography ==
- Feigel, Lara (2007), "Buggery and Montage: Birmingham and Bloomsbury in the 1930s", in Burrells, Anna; Ellis, Steve; Parsons, Deborah; Simpson, Kathryn (eds.), Woolfian Boundaries, Clemson, SC: Clemson University Digital Press, pp. 51–57
- Hall, Michael (2008), Francis Brett Young's Birmingham: North Bromwich – City of Iron (PDF), Birmingham: University of Birmingham, OCLC 690664991
- Hentea, Marius (2011), Social reality and narrative form in the fiction of Henry Green (PDF), Coventry: University of Warwick
- Hill, Joseph (1907), The book makers of old Birmingham; authors, printers, and book sellers, Birmingham: Printed at the Shakespeare Press for Cornish Bros., OCLC 3773421
- Jones, Trevor (1970), Street literature in Birmingham: a history of broadside and chapbook, Oxford: Oxford Polytechnic, ISBN 090269202X
- Money, John (1977), Experience and identity: Birmingham and the West Midlands, 1760–1800, Manchester: Manchester University Press, ISBN 0719006724
- Southworth, Helen (2007), ""Outside the Magic (and Tyrannical) Triangle of London-Oxford-Cambridge": John Hampson, the Woolfs and the Hogarth Press", in Burrells, Anna; Ellis, Steve; Parsons, Deborah; Simpson, Kathryn (eds.), Woolfian Boundaries, Clemson, SC: Clemson University Digital Press, pp. 43–50
