= Birmingham Library =

Birmingham Library may refer to:

== Libraries in Birmingham, England ==
- Birmingham Library (17th century)
- Birmingham Central Library (1971–2013)
- Library of Birmingham, opened 2013

== Libraries in Birmingham, Alabama, USA ==
- Birmingham Public Library
