= St. Philip's Parish Library =

Coordinates: 52.4817°N 1.8976°W

St. Philip's Parish Library, also known as the Higgs Library, was a public library attached to St Philip's Church in Birmingham, England between 1733 and 1927.

The library was founded in 1733 by St. Philip's first rector William Higgs and was based around his own collection of books, supplemented by purchases paid for from a bequest of £200. Unlike Birmingham's earliest public library, founded between 1635 and 1642, or the later Birmingham Library of 1779 – both of which were largely dissenting institutions – Higgs' Library was associated with the established Church of England. Advertised as "free to all clergymen in the town and neighbourhood", it was also open to laymen with the permission of the rectors of St. Philips or of Birmingham's original parish of St Martin in the Bull Ring.

The library moved in 1792 to a room adjoining the parsonage in St. Philip's churchyard. A catalogue of 1795 shows that by then the library had acquired a wide range of books on philosophy, history, economics, education and literary criticism, as well as the expected range of theological and ecclesiastical literature.

The library was closed in 1927, with 300 volumes from its collection being presented to Birmingham Central Library and 150 volumes being presented to Queen's College, Edgbaston.

== See also ==
- List of libraries in Birmingham, West Midlands
