= Aston Library =

Public library in Aston, West Midlands, England

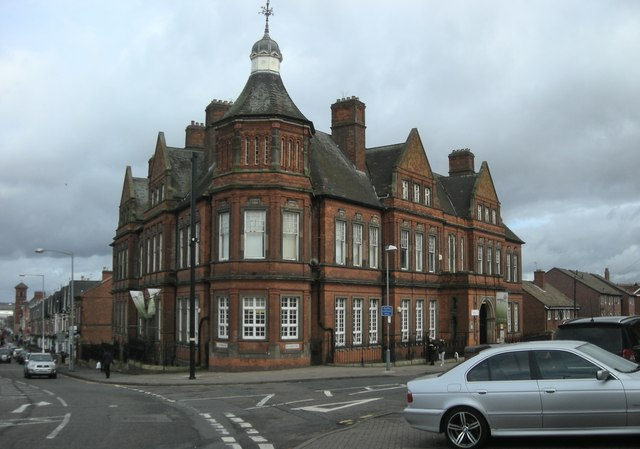
- The building on the corner of Witton Road (on the left) and Albert Road
- Interactive map of the Aston Library area

General information
- Status: Grade II listed
- Location: Aston, West Midlands, United Kingdom
- Coordinates: 52°30′13.784″N 1°53′44.516″W grid reference SP 07171 89551
- Completed: 1881

Design and construction
- Architect: William Henman

Website
- www.birmingham.gov.uk/astonlibrary

Aston Library is a public library in Aston, West Midlands, England, built in 1881. It is a Grade II listed building.

== History and description ==
The building, designed by William Henman, was erected in 1880–81. It was slightly smaller than had been originally planned; the original intention, to house the offices of Aston Manor, with a separate building for the library, was amended so that the library was on the ground floor, and the boardroom and offices were on the first floor.

The Manor of Aston became a borough in 1903, with council offices in the building. From 1911, Aston was part of the city of Birmingham. The building is now a public library of Birmingham City Council.

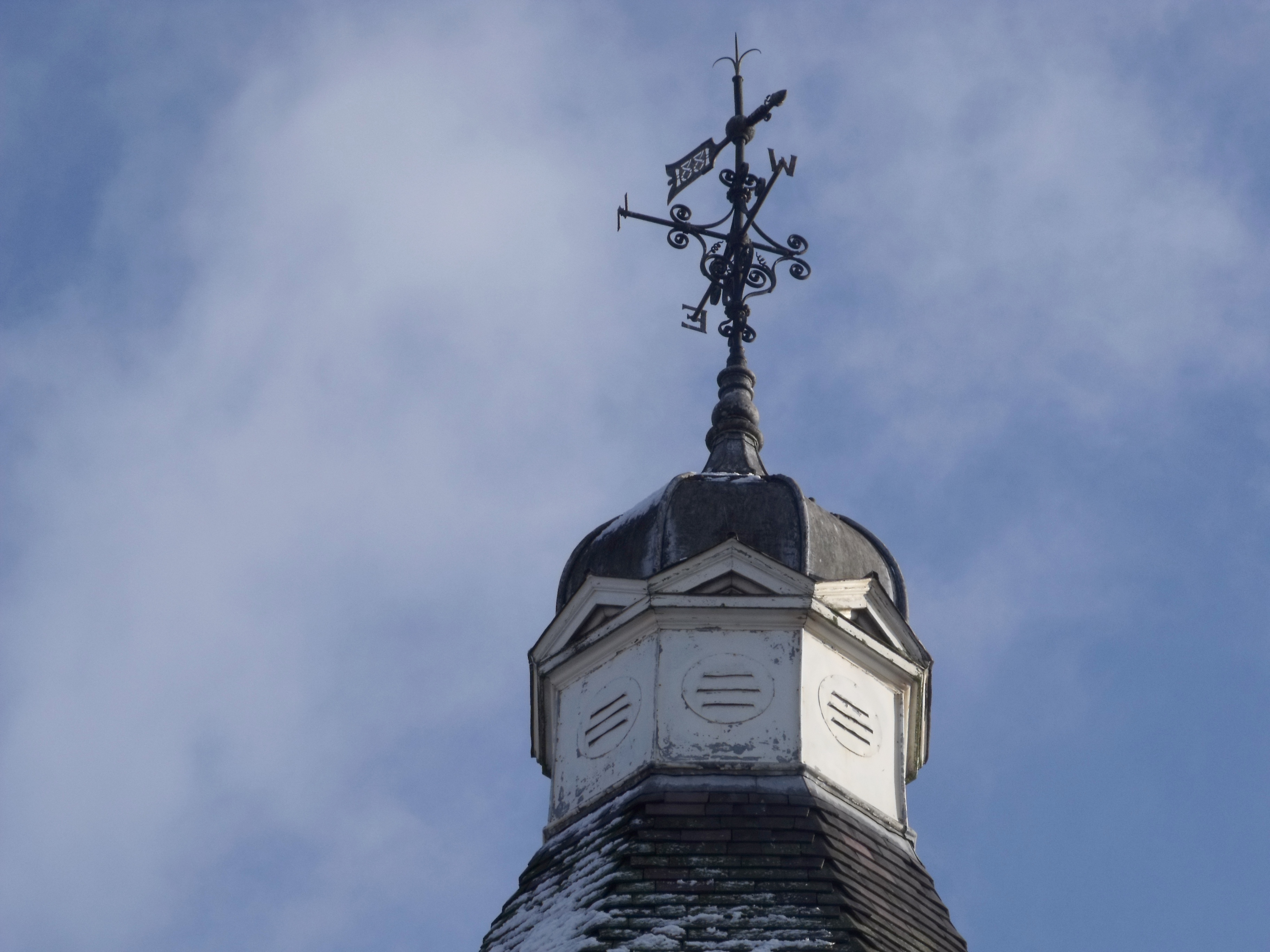
The weather vane at the top of the corner turret

It is described in the listing text as designed in "a loosely Jacobean style". The building, on the corner of Witton Road and Albert Road, is nearly symmetrical. It has an octagonal corner turret at the centre, surmounted by a weather vane bearing the date 1881.

There are fifteen bays on either side of the turret, divided into clusters of three bays. Above the Witton Road entrance is a stone pediment and a tablet which reads "FREE LIBRARY". The Albert Road entrance has an arched portal, leading to a porch where there is a granite foundation stone showing the name of the architect.

== See also ==
- List of libraries in Birmingham, West Midlands
