= Northfield Library =

Coordinates: 52.414753°N 1.967317°W

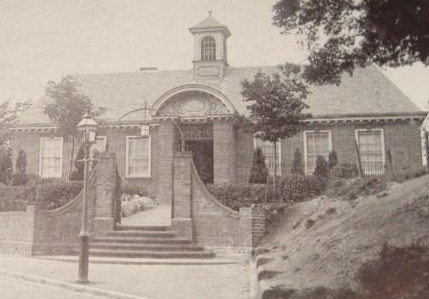
Northfield Library

Northfield Library is a Carnegie library in Northfield, Birmingham, England which in 1914 became the first open-access lending library in Birmingham.

== History ==
Northfield Library was opened in 1906. The land was provided by the Cadbury family and the building constructed with funds of £750 (equivalent to £101,898 in 2023) donated by Andrew Carnegie. The foundation stone was laid by Alderman T. R. Bayliss.

On 12 February 1914 the library burnt to the ground. Suspicion fell on local suffragettes.

It was rebuilt in the same year by the Free Libraries Committee and became the first open-access lending library in Birmingham The façade remains the same; however, in 1984, the library building was doubled in size and a project was undertaken to remove asbestos at the same time.

== See also ==
- List of libraries in Birmingham, West Midlands
