= List of libraries in Birmingham, West Midlands =

This is a list of libraries in the city of Birmingham, West Midlands, England, United Kingdom, including research, subscription, public, and other types of libraries. Some have changed names during their history, or ceased operating, or merged with other organizations.

Notably, the Birmingham City Council operates some 36 public library branches around the city as of 2026.

Current professional librarianship fora include the Midlands group of the UK's Chartered Institute of Library and Information Professionals, among others. Similar groups in the past included the Birmingham and District Library Association (est.1895).

== Libraries ==
- Acocks Green Library
- Adderley Park Branch public library, opened in 1864
- Assay Office Library
- Aston Library
- Aston University Library
- Balsall Heath Library
- Bartley Green Library
- Birchfield Library
- Birmingham and Midland Institute library
- Birmingham Central Library, 1865-2013
  - Shakespeare Memorial Library, opened in 1868
- Birmingham City University libraries
- Birmingham Library (17th century)
- Birmingham Library, est.1779
- Bloomsbury Library
- Boldmere Library
- Boots Book Lovers' Circulating Library
- British Cast Iron Research Association library
- Castle Vale Library
- Church of the Messiah library
- Council House, Handsworth
- Druids Heath Library
- Erdington Library
- Exchange Library
- Frankley Library
- Friends' Library
- Glebe Farm Library
- Gosta Green public library, opened in 1868
- Green Lane Public Library, built in 1902
- Hall Green Library
- Handsworth library
- Harborne Library
- Hawthorn House Library
- Kents Moat Library
- King Edward's School library, est.1642
- Kings Heath Library
- Kings Norton Library
- Kingstanding Library
- Law Society Library
- Library of Birmingham building, opened in 2013
- Mason College Library
- Medical Library and Institute
- Mere Green Library
- Natural History and Philosophical Society library
- New Library, est.1794
- Northfield Library
- Oratory Library, Edgbaston
- Oscott College Library
- Perry Common Library
- Polytechnic Institute Library
- Queen's College Library
- Quinton Library
- St. Philip's Parish Library, Birmingham
- Selly Oak Library
- Shard End Library
- Sheldon Library
- Small Heath Library
- Smith's Circulating Library
- South Yardley Library
- Sparkhill Library
- Spring Hill Library, 1893–2022
- Stirchley Library
- Sutton Coldfield Library
- Technical School library
- Tower Hill Library
- University of Birmingham Libraries
  - Cadbury Research Library
- Walmley Library
- Ward End Library
- Weoley Castle Library
- West Heath Library
- Woodbrooke College Library
- Yardley Wood Library

== See also ==
- Birmingham#Library services
- List of libraries in the United Kingdom
- Literature of Birmingham
- Media in Birmingham
