= Birmingham Book Club =

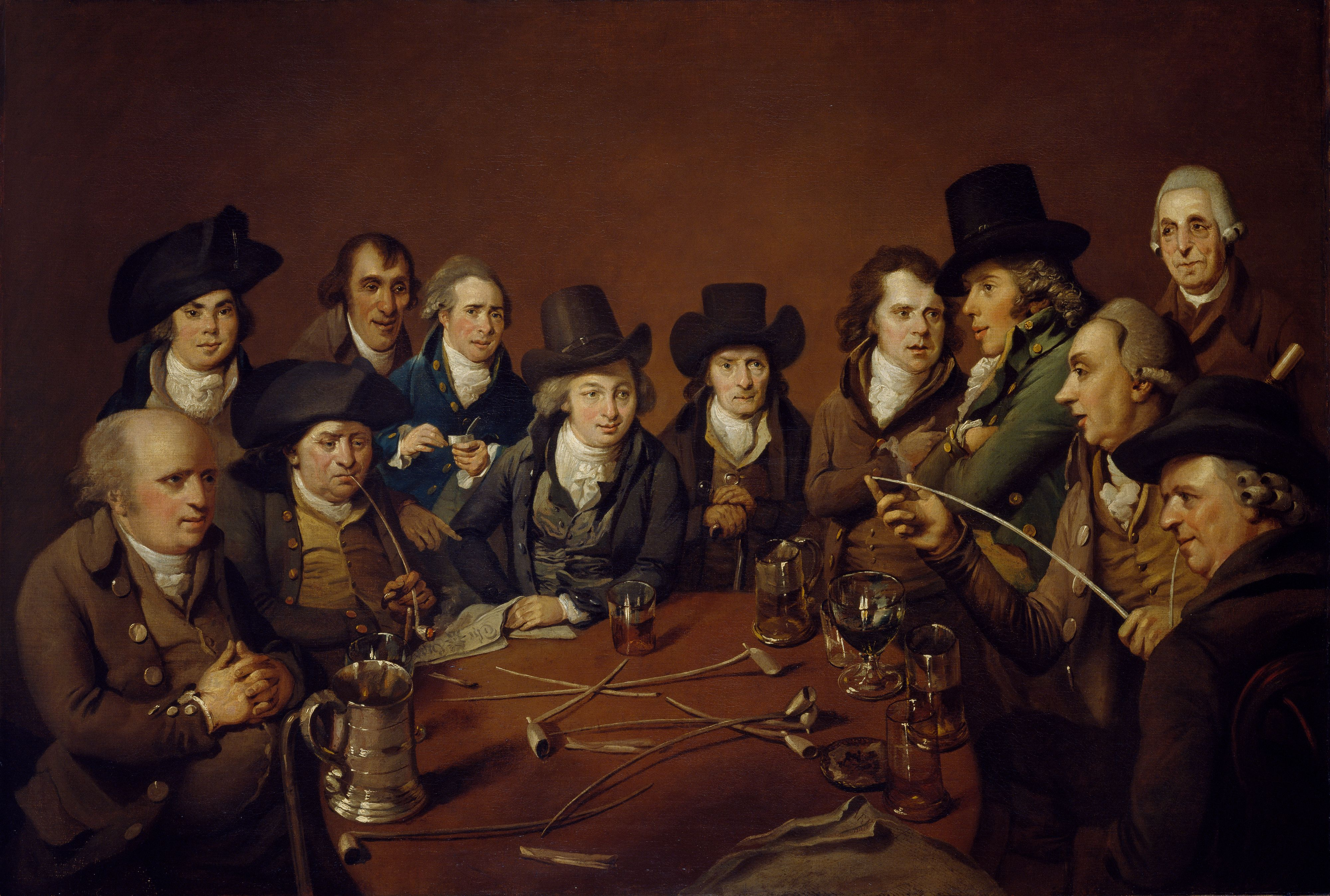
John Freeth and his Circle or Birmingham Men of the Last Century - members of the Birmingham Book Club pictured in 1792 by John Eckstein.

The Birmingham Book Club, known to its opponents during the 1790s as the Jacobin Club due to its political radicalism, and at times also as the Twelve Apostles, is a book club and debating society based in Birmingham, England founded in the 18th century. At that time Midlands Enlightenment, the Radical and Unitarian allegiance of its members give it a national significance.

Little is known of the club's origins, but surviving records suggest that it was in existence by 1745. The club met at Freeth's Coffee House at the Leicester Arms on the corner of Bell Street and Lease Lane in Birmingham from at least 1758. John Freeth announced club dinners to its members with rhyming invitations. 24 members were listed in 1775. Liberal and radical, as much concerned with politics as with books, the club formed a focus for local support for John Wilkes between 1768 and 1774, and for opposition to the Ministry of Lord North during the 1770s and 1780s.

The society held an annual sale of its books, and its members provided the nucleus of subscribers to the Birmingham Library which was founded in 1779.

Most recently, Birmingham Book CLub has coooperated with an initiative by the Grand Hotel in Birmingham (which hosted the club from 1886 to 1954) to provide its guest with an overnight library. Birmingham Book Club currently meets monthly at the Edgbaston Golf Club, the former home of William WIthering.

== Bibliography ==
- Kaufman, Paul (1964), "English Book Clubs and Their Role in Social History", Libri: International Journal of Libraries and Information Services, 14 (1): 1–31, doi:10.1515/libr.1964.14.1.1, ISSN 0024-2667, S2CID 145464179
- Money, John (1977), Experience and identity: Birmingham and the West Midlands, 1760-1800, Manchester University Press, ISBN 0-7190-0672-4
