= Francis Roberts =

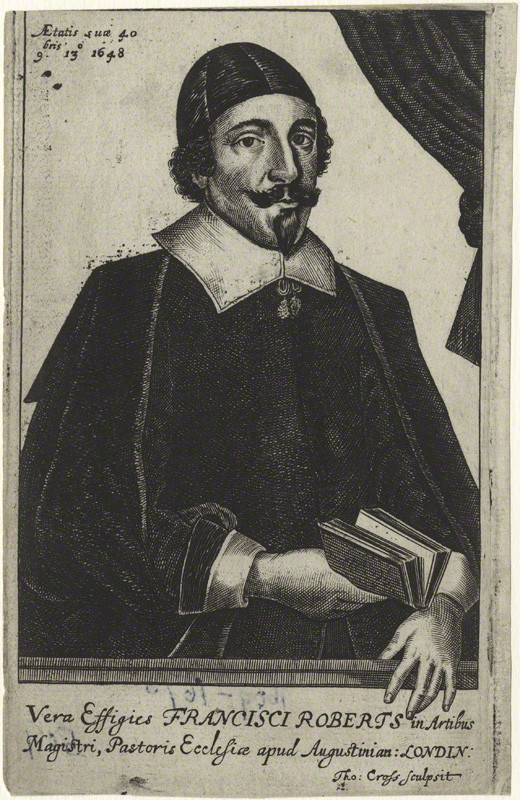

Francis Roberts (1609–1675) was an English puritan Anglican clergyman, author and librarian.

Born in Methley, near Leeds, Roberts was educated at Trinity College, Oxford between 1625 and 1632. He studied as a curate under John Burges in Sutton Coldfield, and by 1635 was established as the resident minister at St Martin in the Bull Ring, the parish church of Birmingham, where he married in 1635 and where two of his children – Mary and Elizabeth – were baptised in 1637 and 1638. While in Birmingham he founded the first Birmingham Library, one of the first public libraries in England, and developed a reputation as a "famed lecturer". During the Battle of Birmingham of April 1643, when the town – noted for its Parliamentarian and puritan support – was attacked by the Royalist Prince Rupert of the Rhine, Royalist troops attacked a minister reported to be a lunatic, "whereupon they supposing him to be Mr. Roberts, Minister of Birmingham, did most cruelly mangle and hack him to death"

Roberts escaped, and was appointed minister of St Augustine Watling Street in the City of London the same year. Under Roberts, the parish became one of the city's most strongly presbyterian, and Roberts himself was a confidant of Robert Baillie and kept in daily touch with Simeon Ashe, Thomas Edwards, and Cornelius Burges.

In 1650 Roberts was appointed rector of Wrington in Somerset, where he was to spend the remainder of his life. Following the Restoration he conformed to the Church of England and in 1673 he was the first chaplain to the Lord Lieutenant of Ireland, Arthur Capell, 1st Earl of Essex.

Roberts was a notable author, writing both scholarly and popular works including Synopsis of Theology or Divinity (1645), Mysterium & medulla bibliorum, the Mysterie and Marrow of the Bible (1657), and Clavis bibliorum; the Key of the Bible (1665) – written for "the help of the weakest capacity in the understanding of the whole Bible".

== Bibliography ==
- Hill, Joseph (1907), The book makers of old Birmingham: authors, printers, and book sellers, New York: B. Franklin (published 1971), ISBN 0-8337-1706-5
- Keene, Nicholas (2004), "Roberts, Francis (1609–1675), Church of England clergyman and author", Oxford Dictionary of National Biography (Online ed.), Oxford University Press
- Liu, Tai (1986), Puritan London: a study of religion and society in the city parishes, Newark, DE: University of Delaware Press, ISBN 0-87413-283-5
