= Freeth's Coffee House =

English tavern and coffee house (1736–1832)

Coordinates: 52.4768°N 1.8954°W

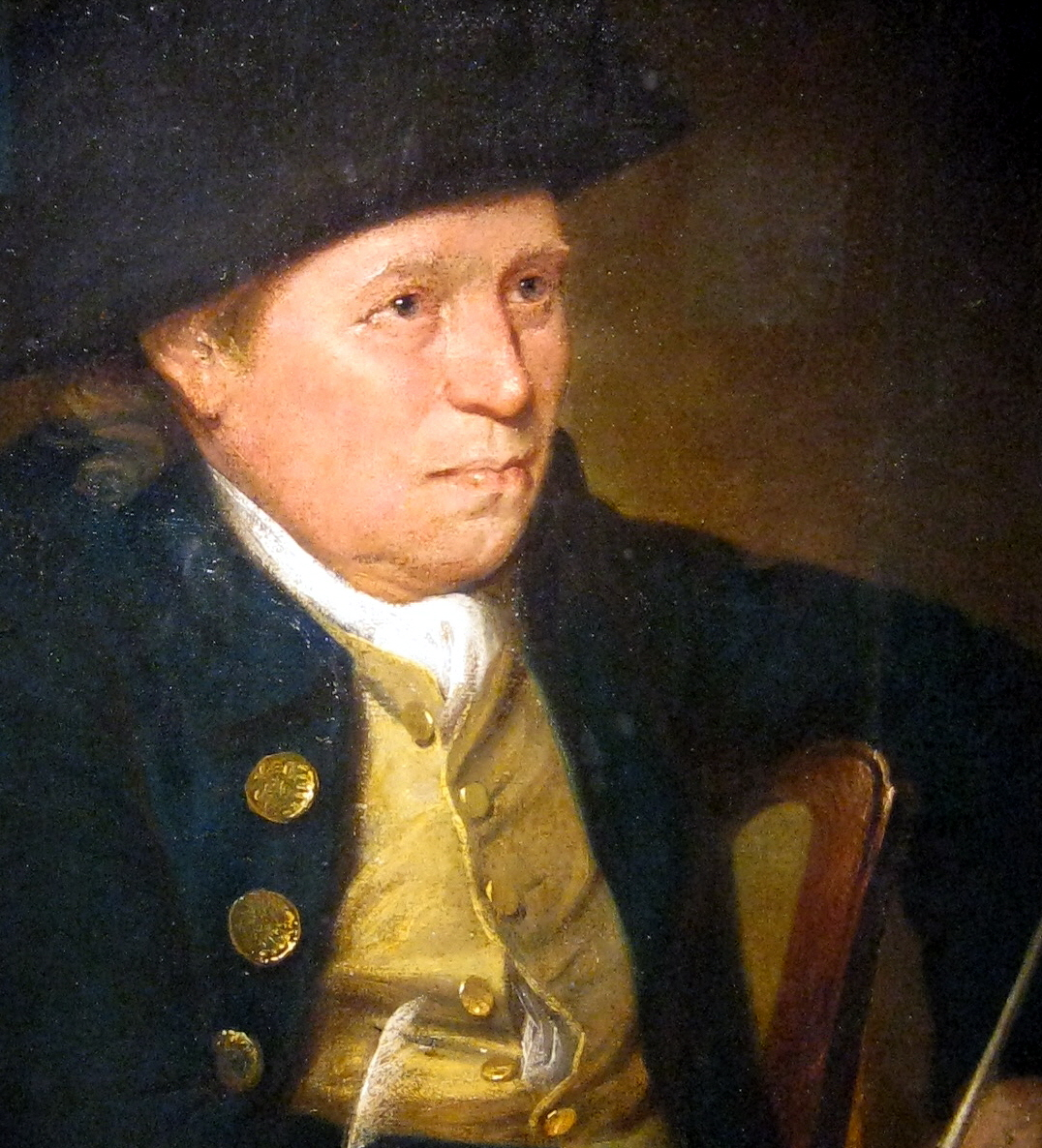
Landlord John Freeth

Freeth's Coffee House, the popular name for the Leicester Arms on the corner of Bell Street and Lease Lane in Birmingham, England, was a tavern and coffee house that operated from 1736 until 1832.

One of the most celebrated meeting places of Georgian England, it was already known during the early eighteenth century as a place for small businessmen and lawyers to conduct business. During the second half of the century, when its landlord was the topical ballad-writer John Freeth, it was at the forefront of the emergence of popular political consciousness in Birmingham, as the host of radical groups such as the Birmingham Book Club, and as the focus for local opposition to the governments of Lord North.

== Bibliography ==
- Horden, John (1993), John Freeth (1731-1808): Political Ballad Writer and Innkeeper, Oxford: Leopard's Head Press, ISBN 0-904920-19-4
- Benbow, Nicholas (2013) [2004]. "Freeth, John [pseud. John Free](1731–1808)". Oxford Dictionary of National Biography (online ed.). Oxford University Press. doi:10.1093/ref:odnb/37433. (Subscription or UK public library membership required.)
- Money, John (1977), Experience and identity: Birmingham and the West Midlands, 1760-1800, Manchester University Press, ISBN 0-7190-0672-4
