= Thomas Hall (minister, born 1610) =

English clergyman and ejected minister

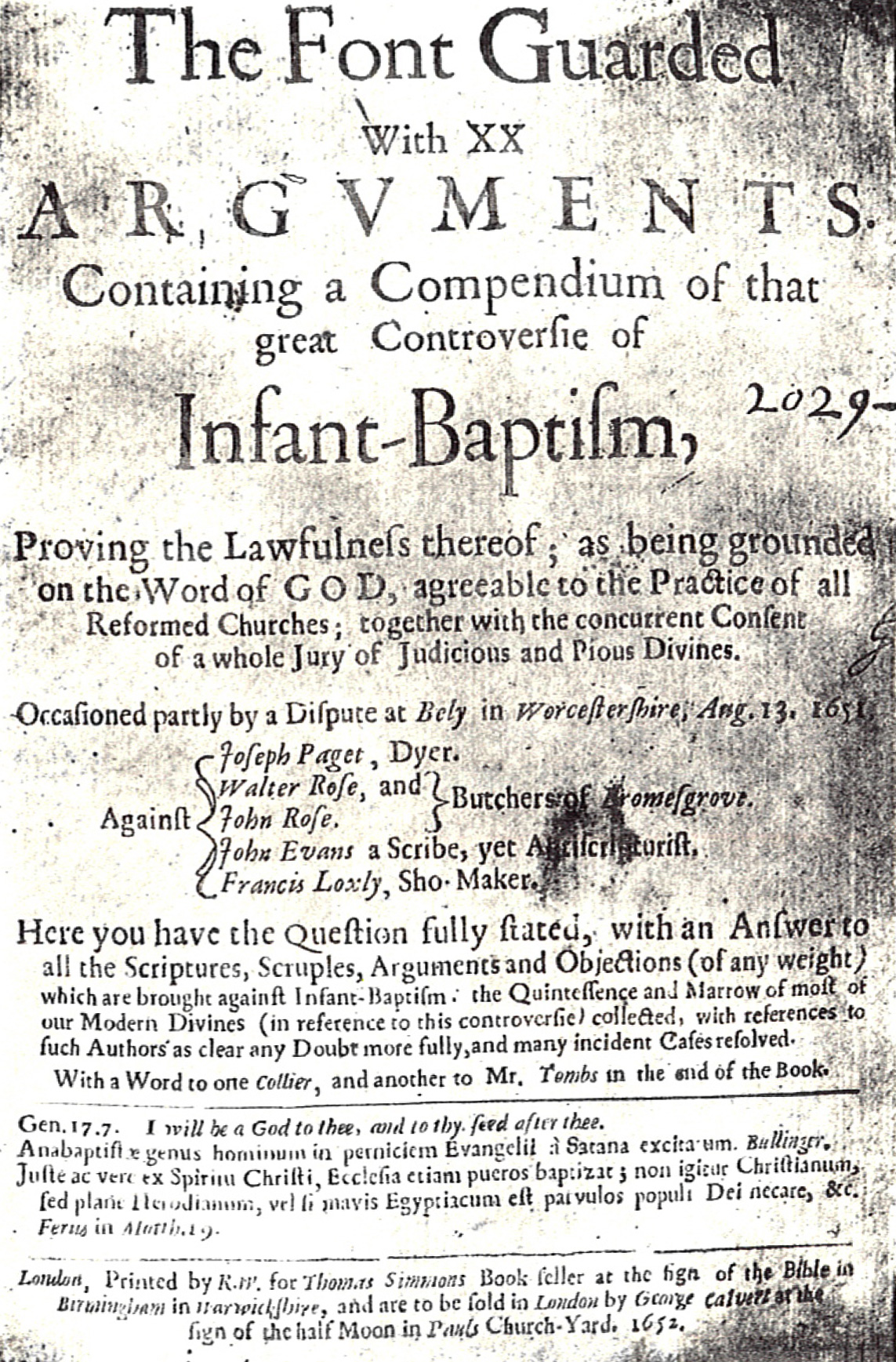
Frontispiece of Hall's 1652 work The Font Guarded

Thomas Hall (1610–1665) was an English clergyman and ejected minister.

== Life ==
He was the son of Richard Hall, clothier, by his wife Elizabeth (Bonner), and was born in St. Andrew's parish, Worcester, about 22 July 1610. He was educated at the King's School, Worcester, under Henry Bright, one of the most celebrated schoolmasters of the day. In 1624 he entered Balliol College, Oxford, as an exhibitioner. Finding himself under 'a careless tutor,' he moved to the newly founded Pembroke College as a pupil of Thomas Lushington. He graduated B.A. on 7 February 1629. Returning to Worcestershire, he became a teacher at a private school. He preached in the chapels of several hamlets in the parish of Kings Norton, of which his brother, John Hall, vicar of Bromsgrove, was perpetual curate. At this period he conformed, but attendance at the puritan lecture, maintained at Birmingham, contributed to making him a presbyterian. He became curate at Kings Norton under his brother, who soon resigned the living in his favour. The living was of little value, but Hall obtained the mastership of the Grammar School, founded by Edward VI.

During the civil war he was 'many times plundered, and five times imprison'd', according to Edmund Calamy. He refused preferment when his party was in power. In June 1652 he 'had liberty allow'd him by the delegates of the university' to take the degree of B.D. on the terms of preaching a Latin and an English sermon. His presbyterian principles prevented him from joining Richard Baxter's Worcestershire agreement in 1653; and he became a member of the presbytery of Kenilworth, Warwickshire (see Obadiah Grew). He, however, signed Baxter's Worcestershire petition for the retention of tithe and a settled ministry.

Hall was a 'plain but fervent' preacher, and 'a lover of books and learning'. When the first Birmingham library was established in connection with the Birmingham grammar school he contributed many books, and collected others from his friends. Subsequently, he founded a similar library at Kings Norton; the parish at his instance erected a building, and Hall transferred to it all his books for public use. After his ejection by the Uniformity Act (1662) he was reduced to great poverty, but his friends did not allow him to want. He died on 13 April 1665, and was buried at Kings Norton.

== Views ==
He was a "high" Presbyterian, concerned to put in place a national church.

Histrio-mastix, or A Whip for Webster, starts from a clear mistake of the identity of John Webster the physician, for the dead dramatist John Webster; Hall argues from an "unyielding Aristotelian" point of view, and for no change in the educational system. It was a companion to the Vindiciae literarum (1654), which Christopher Hill calls "hysterical".

He was an opponent of astrology, associating it in Histrio-mastix with the 'Familistical-Levelling-Magical temper'.

== Family ==
John Hall (1633–1710), Bishop of Bristol, was his nephew.

== Works ==
Hall wrote:

- Wisdoms Conquest. &c. 1651, translation of the contest of Ajax and Ulysses, Ovid, Metamorphoses. xiii.
- The Pulpit Guarded with XVII. Arguments, &c., against unlicensed preachers; with appendix, also found separately, Six Arguments to prove our Ministers free from Antichristianisme, &c., 1651.
- The Font Guarded with XX. Arguments, &c., 1651 (i.e. 1652), against indiscriminate baptism; has appendix, The Collier and his Colours, &c., 1662, against Thomas Collier, a General Baptist preacher, of Unitarian views; and second appendix, Praeecursor Praecursoris: or a Word to Mr. Tombs, &c., 1652, against John Tombes (1603–1666), Baptist preacher.
- The Beauty of Holiness, 1653; Wood gives 1656; perhaps a second edition.
- Comarum Ἀκοσμία. The Loathsomnesse of Long Haire. ... Appendix ... against & Painting, &c.,1654.
- Centuria Sacra ... Rules for ... understanding of the Holy Scriptures, 1654, 8vo.
- Rhetorica Sacra ... Tropes and Figures contained in the Sacred Scriptures, &c., 1654.
- Histrio-mastix. A Whip for Webster, &c., 1654, against an "examen of academies" appended to John Webster's Saint's Guide, 1654.
- Vindiciae Literarium; the Schools Guarded, &c., 1654 (i.e. 1655); makes all learning a handmaid to divinity.
- Phaetons Folly, &c., 1655, translations of Ovid, Metamorphoses ii. and Tristia eleg. i.
- A Scriptural Discourse of the Apostacy of Antichrist, &c., 1655.
- Chiliastomastix Redivivus, sive Homesus Enervatus. A Confutation of the Millenarian Opinion .., with a Word to our Fifth-monarchy Men, &c., 1657, (Wood); 1658, against The Resurrection Revealed, 1654, by Nathaniel Holmes, D.D.
- A Practical and Polemical Commentary, on 2 Tim. iii. iv., &c., 1658.
- Tὸ ὅλος τῆς γῆς: sive Apologia pro Ministerio Evangelico, &c., Frankfort, 1658; in English, Apology for the Ministry, &c., 1660, (Smith).
- Samaria's Downfall, &c., 1659, 4to; commentary on Hosea xiii. 12–16, supplementary to the Exposition of Jeremiah Burroughes; 1660; 1843; appended is an attack on Solomon Eccles, the Quaker.
- The Beauty of Magistracy, &c., 1660, written with George Swinnocke.
- Funebria Florae. The Downfall of May-games, &c., 1660; 1661, two editions.
- An Exposition: [Amos, iv–ix.], &c., 1661.

== Sources ==
- Thomas, Denise, ed. (2015). The Autobiography and Library of Thomas Hall, B.D. (1610-1665). New series. Vol. 26. Worcestershire Historical Society.
- Thomas, Denise (2013). "The Pastoral Ministry of Thomas Hall (1610–1665) in the English Revolution". Midland History. 38 (2): 169–193. doi:10.1179/0047729X13Z.00000000025.
- Calamy, Edmund (1713), "King's Norton, Mr Thomas Hall B.D.", An account of the ministers, lecturers, masters, and fellows of colleges and schoolmasters: who were ejected or silenced after the Restoration in 1660, by or before, the Act of Uniformity., vol. 1, London: Printed for J. Lawrence, pp. 765–7
- Gilbert, C. D. (2004). "Hall, Thomas". Oxford Dictionary of National Biography (online ed.). Oxford University Press. doi:10.1093/ref:odnb/11990. (Subscription, Wikipedia Library access or UK public library membership required.)
- Gordon, Alexander (1917), Freedom after ejection: a review (1690-1692) of Presbyterian and Congregational nonconformity in England and Wales, Manchester: University Press
