= John Freeth =

English poet

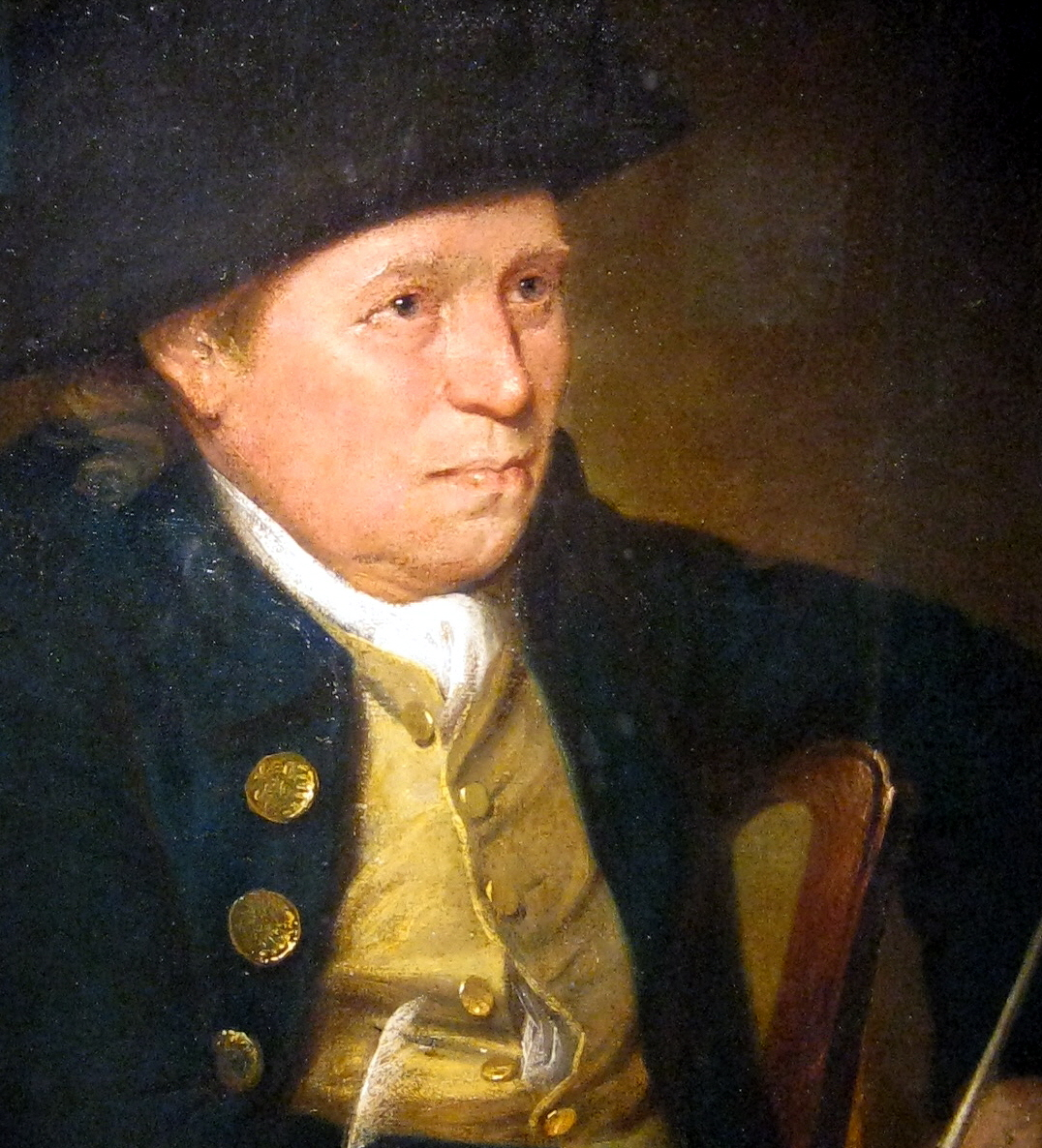
John Freeth by unknown artist circa 1800

John Freeth (1731 – 29 September 1808), also known as Poet Freeth and who published his work under the pseudonym John Free, was an English innkeeper, poet and songwriter. As the owner of Freeth's Coffee House between 1768 and his death in 1808, he was a major figure in the political and cultural life of Birmingham during the Midlands Enlightenment.

== Bibliography ==
- Horden, John (1993), John Freeth (1731-1808): Political Ballad Writer and Innkeeper, Oxford: Leopard's Head Press, ISBN 0-904920-19-4
- Money, John (1977), Experience and identity: Birmingham and the West Midlands, 1760-1800, Manchester University Press, ISBN 0-7190-0672-4

== See also ==
- List of 18th-century British working-class writers
