= Birmingham Library (17th century) =

Library in Birmingham, England

The first Birmingham Library was founded between 1635 and 1642 in Birmingham, England by the puritan minister Francis Roberts. A letter to the Viscount Conway, surviving in the state papers of Charles I and dated 7 August 1637, possibly refers to a catalogue of the library:

I have spoken with Mr. Bellers for the catalogue of books he promise to send your Lordship and he tells me he did send for one but there is none drawne as yett, for that Mr. Burges (who oweth them) is little time where is bookes are and that Mr. Roberts, who was a curate to his father and one upon whose assistance and iudgemt in the drawing of a Catalogue Mr. Burgiss doth much rely, is now resideing nere Burmingeham, that is much infected with the sickenes and therefore doth not stir from thence but Mr. Bellers is very confident that the first catalogue that is delivered shall be to yr L'rp.

A building was erected for the library between 1655 and 1656, and the accounts of the High Bailiff of Birmingham for 1655 include 3 pounds, 2 shillings and 6 pence paid to "Thomas Bridgens towards buildinge ye library", with £126 2s 9d following in 1656 "For buildinge the library, repayreing the Schoole and schoole-masters' houses". The library's puritan tradition continued in 1656 when Thomas Hall left the finest examples from his book collection to "the library at Birmingham"; the rest, "being ordinary books and not fit for so publick a library" were left to the clergymen and schoolmasters of Moseley, King's Norton and Wythall.

Although the library was one of the first public libraries in England, its puritan origins meant that its collection was dispersed after the Restoration of 1660.

== See also ==
- List of libraries in Birmingham, West Midlands

== Bibliography ==
- Hill, Joseph (1907), The book makers of old Birmingham: authors, printers, and book sellers, New York: B. Franklin (published 1971), ISBN 0-8337-1706-5
- Money, John (1977), Experience and identity: Birmingham and the West Midlands, 1760-1800, Manchester University Press, ISBN 0-7190-0672-4
