= Birmingham (disambiguation) =

Birmingham is the second-most populous city in England and the United Kingdom.

Birmingham may also refer to:

== Places ==
=== Canada ===
- Birmingham, Saskatchewan, an unincorporated community

=== United States ===
- Birmingham, Alabama, a large city in Alabama
- Birmingham, Connecticut, now Derby, a city
- Birmingham, Indiana, an unincorporated community
- Birmingham, Iowa, a city
- Birmingham, Kansas, an unincorporated community
- Birmingham, Kentucky, a sunken town
- Birmingham, Michigan, a city
- Birmingham, Missouri, a village
- Birmingham, New Jersey, an unincorporated community
- Birmingham, Coshocton County, Ohio, a ghost town
- Birmingham, Erie County, Ohio, an unincorporated community
- Birmingham, Guernsey County, Ohio, an unincorporated community
- Birmingham, Chester County, Pennsylvania, a township
- Birmingham, Huntingdon County, Pennsylvania, a borough
- Birmingham, Pittsburgh, Pennsylvania, the former name of Pittsburgh's South Side neighborhood
- Birmingham Township (disambiguation), several places

== Education ==
=== United Kingdom ===
- University of Birmingham, Birmingham, England (founded 1900)

=== United States ===
- Birmingham–Southern College, Birmingham, Alabama
- Birmingham High School, Los Angeles, California

== People ==
- Birmingham (surname), including a list of people with the name
- De Birmingham family, which held the lordship of Birmingham in England

== Ships ==
=== Royal Navy ===
- HMS Birmingham (1913), a Town-class light cruiser launched in 1913 and sold in 1931
- HMS Birmingham (C19), a cruiser launched in 1936 and broken up in 1960
- HMS Birmingham (D86), a Type 42 destroyer in service from 1976 to 1999

=== United States Navy ===
- USS Birmingham (CL-2), a light cruiser in service from 1908 to 1923
- USS Birmingham (CL-62), a light cruiser, in service from 1943 to 1946 and involved in heavy fighting in the Pacific Ocean during World War II
- USS Birmingham (SSN-695), a Los Angeles class nuclear attack submarine in service from 1978 to 1997

== Songs ==
- "Birmingham" (1974), a song by Randy Newman from the album Good Old Boys
- Birmingham (Amanda Marshall song), 1996
- "Birmingham" (2001), a song by Drive-By Truckers from the album Southern Rock Opera
- "Birmingham" (2012), a song by Shovels & Rope
- "Birmingham (We Are Safe)", a song by the David Crowder*Band from the album Church Music
- “Birmingham” (2021), a song by the American Punk rock band NOFX from the album Single Album

== Sport ==
- Birmingham Barons, a minor league baseball team
- Birmingham Bulls (WHA), a defunct professional ice hockey team
- Birmingham Bullets, a defunct basketball team
- Birmingham City F.C., an English football club that currently play in the EFL Championship
- Birmingham City L.F.C., an English ladies' football club
- Birmingham Football Club, a defunct English football club
- Birmingham (horse), a British Thoroughbred racehorse
- Birmingham Stallions, an American football team that plays in the United Football League (UFL)

== Transportation ==
=== Air travel ===
- Birmingham Airport, Birmingham, England
- Birmingham–Shuttlesworth International Airport, Birmingham, Alabama
- G-BDXJ, the former British Airways Boeing 747-200 City of Birmingham

=== Railroads ===
- Birmingham railway (disambiguation)
- Birmingham station (disambiguation)
- LMS Coronation Class (4)6235 City of Birmingham, an LMS Coronation Class steam railway locomotive

=== Other transportation ===
- Birmingham Motors, U.S. automobile brand of the 1920s

== Other uses ==
- Birmingham, a star in the constellation Cygnus
- Birmingham, a style of home described in the song Paint Me a Birmingham
- Birmingham (crater), a lunar crater
- Birmingham (HM Prison), a prison in Birmingham, England
- Birmingham (UK Parliament constituency), constituency 1832–1885

== See also ==
- New Birmingham, County Tipperary, Ireland
- New Birmingham, Texas, United States
- Bermingham
