= Bermingham =

Bermingham is a surname, and may refer to:

- Alan Bermingham (born 1944), English former professional footballer
- Ann Bermingham (born 1948), American art historian
- Anne Bermingham (1925–2006), Australian chemist
- Brendan Bermingham (born 1956), Irish retired sportsperson
- Brendon Bermingham (1914–1975), Australian rules footballer
- Brian Bermingham, former Irish Fine Gael politician and former Cork City Council member
- David Bermingham (born 1962), English banker, part of the Natwest Three
- Debra Bermingham (born 1953), American artist
- Edward Bermingham, 13th Baron Athenry (died 1709), Anglo-Irish lord
- Edward J. Bermingham (1887–1958), American investment banker
- Ellis Bermingham, Countess of Brandon (1708–1789)
- Erin Bermingham (born 1988), New Zealand cricketer
- Francis Bermingham (fl. 1652), Irish Franciscan friar and scholar
- Gerry Bermingham (1940–2023), British politician
- Ian Bermingham (born 1989), Irish footballer
- James Bermingham, Bishop of Killala
- James Bermingham (1849–1907), Member of the Irish Republican Brotherhood (IRB)
- Jennifer Bermingham, American professional golfer
- Jimmy Bermingham, Irish soccer player
- John Michael Bermingham (1905–1942), US Navy officer
- John Bermingham (1923–2020), American politician
- Joseph Bermingham (1919–1995), Irish politician
- Joseph Bermingham (priest) (1801–1874), Irish Anglican priest
- Karl Bermingham (born 1985), Irish footballer
- Margaret Ball (born Margaret Bermingham, 1515–1584), Irish Catholic martyr
- Mick Bermingham, Irish hurler
- Paddy Bermingham (athlete) (1886–1959), Irish police officer and sportsman
- Paddy Bermingham (footballer) (1904–1970), Irish footballer
- Philip Bermingham (c. 1420–1490), Irish judge
- Rachael Bermingham, Australian entrepreneur, author, public speaker
- Thérèse Bermingham, Irish former Vice-Chairman of the World Scout Committee
- Thomas Bermingham (priest) (1918–1998), American Jesuit priest, teacher and scholar
- Thomas Bermingham, 1st Earl of Louth (1717–1799), Anglo-Irish politician and peer
- Willie Bermingham (1942–1990), Irish firefighter and campaigner, who founded A.L.O.N.E.

== See also ==
- Bermingham (surname), for an article about the name
- Bermingham Castles of Ireland
- Birmingham (disambiguation)
