= Wholesaling =

Sale of goods or merchandise to retailers rather than end consumers

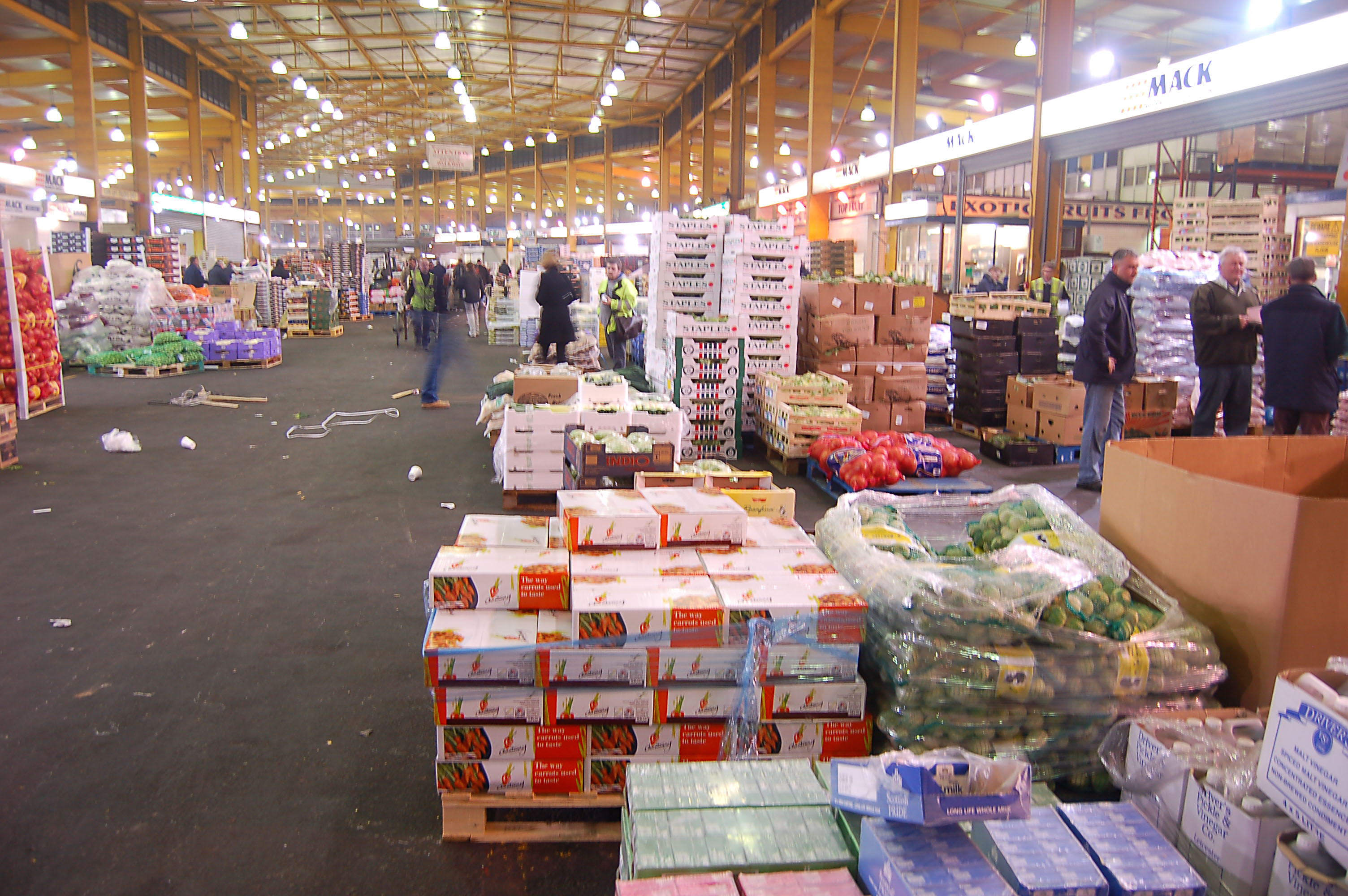
The Birmingham Wholesale Markets

Wholesaling or distributing is the sale of goods or merchandise to retailers; to industrial, commercial, institutional or other professional business users; or to other wholesalers (wholesale businesses) and related subordinated services. In general, it is the sale of goods in bulk to anyone, either a person or an organization, other than the end consumer of that merchandise. Wholesaling involves purchasing goods in bulk, usually directly from the manufacturer or source, at a discounted rate. Retailers then sell these goods to end consumers at a higher price, generating a profit.

Traditionally, wholesalers were closer to the markets they supplied than the source from which they got the products. However, with the advent of the internet and e-procurement there is an increasing number of wholesalers located nearer to the manufacturers in China, Taiwan, and Southeast Asia. The profit margins of wholesalers depend largely on their ability to achieve market competitive transaction costs.

== Definition ==
According to the United Nations Statistics Division, wholesale is the resale of new and used goods to retailers, to industrial, commercial, institutional or professional users, or to other wholesalers, or involves acting as an agent or broker in buying merchandise for, or selling merchandise to, such persons or companies. Wholesalers frequently physically assemble, sort, and grade goods in large lots, break-bulk, repack, and redistribute in smaller lots. While wholesalers of most products usually operate from independent premises, wholesale marketing for foodstuffs can take place at specific wholesale markets where all traders are congregated. In the International Standard Industrial Classification (ISIC Rev.4), wholesale trade is primarily Division 46 ("Wholesale trade, except of motor vehicles and motorcycles"). In the NAICS, wholesale trade is Sector 42, commonly separated into merchant wholesalers and agents/brokers (including electronic markets).

A common way to distinguish wholesale from retail is by the main customer:

- Wholesale trade: mainly sells to organizations that will resell or use goods in operations (business-to-business).
- Retail trade: mainly sells to households/consumers.

=== Direct selling and "disintermediation" ===
The alternative to selling wholesale to distributors or retailers is to sell to retail customers either through company-owned stores or online. Advantages include receiving a larger slice of the price paid by the consumer; disadvantages include difficulty in reaching consumers. Direct selling is usually discussed as a model where products are sold through person-to-person selling outside a fixed retail establishment. The U.S. FTC uses this "outside a retail establishment" framing in its business guidance materials regarding multi level marketing.

=== Other uses of the word "wholesale" ===
In the banking industry "wholesale" usually refers to wholesale banking, providing tailored services to large customers, in contrast with retail banking, providing standardized services to large numbers of smaller customers.

In real estate, wholesaling is the act of contracting to purchase real property, and assigning that contract to an investor.

== Commercial role and core functions ==
Wholesalers exist because they can reduce friction between many producers and many buyers. They often:

- Assemble and consolidate supply from multiple sources.
- Sort, grade, and create assortments that match buyer needs.
- Break bulk (split large shipments into smaller lots), repack, and redistribute.
- Store and handle goods (including cold chain), and may deliver, install, or provide after-sales services in some categories.

In international trade, wholesalers and other intermediaries can also lower market-entry barriers for smaller producers and buyers by providing networks, compliance know-how, and market search capabilities. OECD notes that the broader distribution sector (which includes wholesale and retail) can represent a sizable share of commercial activity in OECD countries.

=== Types of wholesalers and distribution models ===
==== Merchant wholesalers ====
These firms take ownership of inventory and earn a margin by buying and reselling. They can specialize by product (food, pharmaceuticals, industrial inputs) or by customer segment (construction trades, hospitality, public sector).

==== Large organized wholesale markets ====
Some countries operate huge, centralized wholesale markets that serve as key price-formation and distribution points for food and consumer goods. Examples:

- Central de Abasto (Mexico City), described as the world's largest wholesale market by land area in a major regional publication, with very large daily merchandise volumes.
- Birmingham Wholesale Markets are the largest combined wholesale fresh produce markets in the United Kingdom, with 90 trading units totalling 31,000 m^{2} (330,000 sq ft).
- Yiwu International Trade City (China), often described as the world's largest wholesale market for small commodities and a major node in global supply chains.

==== Agents, brokers, and commission merchants ====
These firms typically do not take title to goods. Instead, they earn a commission or fee for matching buyers and sellers, negotiating terms, or arranging logistics.

==== Cash-and-carry wholesale ====
A "cash-and-carry" operator sells from a warehouse-style site where business customers generally pay at purchase and transport goods themselves. This model is common for small retailers and food service buyers in many countries.

==== Import/export wholesalers and regional distribution hubs ====
Many wholesalers focus on cross-border flows, including import consolidation, local warehousing, and re-export to nearby markets. Free zones and logistics clusters can support these models (for example, large hubs in the Gulf used for regional distribution).

==== Digital wholesale and B2B platforms ====
Wholesale is increasingly supported by e-procurement, B2B marketplaces, and automated order-to-cash processes (catalogs, electronic orders, invoicing, and payments).

UNCTAD reports that "business e-commerce" sales grew strongly from 2016 to 2022 (with trillions of dollars in value across measured economies), reflecting the growing role of digital channels in business purchasing and selling.

Artificial Intelligence (AI) has been used in B2B sourcing and procurement more recently but can still be considered in its infancy. When AI is used to address business issues, the main features of AI include increasing human efficiency and automation.

=== Regulation and Taxes ===
==== Resale exemptions and sales tax (United States) ====
Often, in the United States, wholesalers are not required to charge their buyers sales tax, if the buyer has a resale license in the state the wholesaler is located. Out-of-state buyers are not charged sale tax by wholesalers. Documentation requirements vary by state.

==== VAT systems ====
In Europe, Value-Added Tax (VAT) rates vary among member states, with a standard rate that cannot be less than 15%. Countries like Hungary, Croatia, Denmark, and Sweden have higher standard VAT rates, while Luxembourg, Malta, Cyprus, Greece, Germany, and Romania have lower rates.

In China, wholesalers were subject to a Value-Added Tax (VAT) of either 9% or 13% on imported goods, depending on the type of product. Additionally, consumption tax is levied on products such as tobacco, alcohol, and luxury goods. These taxes are part of China's broader strategy to promote domestic consumption and regulate imports. A recent set of summaries of China's VAT law changes describes a maintained multi-rate VAT structure, including 13% for many goods sales/imports and other rates for specific categories.

On the other hand, Vietnam imposed a standard VAT rate of 10% on most goods and services, with exemptions for certain agricultural products and essential services. In recent years, Vietnam has used a temporary VAT reduction policy with an extension of an 8% rate for many goods and services (with notable exclusions) through the end of 2026.

== History ==
=== Early roots ===
Long before modern companies existed, economies still needed people and firms that could bridge distance, timing, and risk between producers and buyers. Economic historians describe the rise of merchants and other intermediaries as a recurring feature of market development, including in ancient trade and later market commerce.

=== Medieval to early modern era ===
In medieval Europe, merchant guilds organized long-distance commerce and also participated in local wholesale trade. These guilds protected members, negotiated privileges, and in some places influenced city government and rules that shaped how goods were distributed and sold. In many regions, food distribution also relied on wholesale markets where trade concentrated in one place. Over time, wholesale markets became important for matching supply with demand and supporting price formation in urban food systems.

=== Modern era till 1900 ===
Wholesaling was central to economic development, especially in periods when manufacturing and retail were still small-scale. Before 1850s, wholesale merchants were multipurpose connectors who often provided financing, warehousing, information, freight coordination, and risk-taking, and who helped establish broader market systems. As transport and communication improved, wholesaling expanded and professionalized. From the mid-1850s, national markets began to take shape "due in part to the telegraph, the railroad and maritime transportation," increasing the separation between producers and buyers and creating larger "market gaps." As mass production emerged toward the end of the 19th century and producers clustered near inputs and transport, market gaps widened further, and a broader class of middlemen grew to close those gaps.

=== First half of 20th century ===
In the 20th century, many cities built or reorganized formal wholesale market systems for food distribution. For example, Osaka's municipal government documents that its Central Wholesale Market opened in November 1931, following licensing and consolidation steps earlier in the century, and that the wholesale system resumed after wartime disruption. At the same time, the role of wholesale markets changed in many countries as retail formats evolved. FAO notes that the characteristics of wholesale markets have changed "considerably over the last century," in part due to urban growth and the rising role of supermarkets, which changed how food distribution needed to work.

=== Second half of 20th century ===
Several operational breakthroughs reshaped wholesaling and distribution globally. Large-scale distributors regained more control over distribution in many categories.:

- Containerization (1956): The container ship Ideal X sailed in April 1956 carrying standardized containers, a milestone that helped cut loading time and supported the rise of modern global supply chains.
- Cash-and-carry wholesale (1960s): The launch of METRO Cash & Carry in 1964 in Germany as a model where professional customers selected goods under one roof, paid, and took items directly, a format that spread internationally.
- Distribution centers (early 1970s): Walmart's first distribution center and home office opened in Bentonville, Arkansas in 1971, reflecting the broader shift toward centralized warehousing and controlled replenishment.
- Barcodes (1974): Multiple credible historical sources report that the first UPC scan occurred on June 26, 1974, at a Marsh supermarket in Troy, Ohio, using a pack of Wrigley's gum, helping enable faster receiving, inventory control, and checkout across supply chains.

As supply chains scaled, businesses invested in electronic document exchange. EDI is widely described as a way to replace paper documents (such as purchase orders and invoices) with standardized electronic messages, with origins traced back to the 1960s and wider adoption later.

=== 21st century ===
In the 21st century, wholesaling has increasingly combined physical networks (ports, warehouses, cold chain) with digital coordination (catalogs, online ordering, forecasting, and platform-based matching).

UN Trade and Development (UNCTAD) reports that business e-commerce sales grew strongly in recent years, reaching about $27 trillion in 2022 (across the economies included in its measurement work), highlighting how digital channels have become central to business purchasing and selling.

== See also ==
- Business-to-business
- Cash and carry (wholesale)
- Distribution (marketing)
- Jobbing house
- Supply chain
- Supply network
- Retail
