= Birmingham (surname) =

Birmingham is a surname. Notable people with the surname include:

- Billy Birmingham (born 1953), Australian humorist
- Brenton Birmingham (born 1972), American-Icelandic basketball player
- Christian Birmingham, British illustrator
- Dan Birmingham, American boxing trainer
- DeCori Birmingham (born 1982), American football player
- Edward de Birmingham (died bef. 1538), last member of the Birmingham family to hold the lordship of Birmingham
- George Birmingham (born 1954), Irish politician and judge
- Gil Birmingham (born 1953), American actor
- Joe Birmingham (1884–1946), American baseball player
- John Birmingham (various)
- Kevin M. Birmingham (1971–2023), American Roman Catholic bishop
- Leo Birmingham (1893–1936), American politician
- Peter de Birmingham (12th century), founder of Birmingham as a regional economic centre
- Ray Birmingham (born 1955), American college baseball coach
- Richard Birmingham (died c. 1726), Justice of the Colonial Delaware Supreme Court
- Simon Birmingham (born 1974), Australian politician
- Stephen Birmingham (1929–2015), American author
- Tom Birmingham (1949–2023), American politician

== See also ==
- De Birmingham family
- Bermingham
