= Xie Gaohua =

Chinese politician (1931–2019)

- 谢高华

Communist Party Secretary of Yiwu
- In office April 1982 – December 1984

Personal details
- Born: December 17, 1931 Henglu Township, Quzhou, Zhejiang
- Died: 23 October 2019 (aged 87)
- Party: Chinese Communist Party
- Occupation: Politician

Chinese name
- Simplified Chinese: 谢高华
- Traditional Chinese: 謝高華
Transcriptions
Standard Mandarin
- Hanyu Pinyin: Xiè Gāohuá
- Wade–Giles: Hsieh⁴ Kao¹-hua²

Xie Gaohua (Chinese: 谢高华; 17 December 1931 – 23 October 2019) was a Chinese politician. When serving as Party Secretary of Yiwu County in 1982, he pioneered free-market policies and established the Yiwu Market, which has since grown into the world's largest small commodities market. He later served as Executive Vice Mayor of Quzhou and was elected a delegate to the 8th National People's Congress. In 2018, the Chinese government awarded him the honorary title of "Reform Pioneer".

== Early life and career ==
Xie was born in November 1931 in Henglu Township (横路乡), Quzhou, Zhejiang, Republic of China, and received a middle school-level education. After joining the Chinese Communist Party in May 1953, he served as a low-level official in Quzhou. During the Cultural Revolution, he was persecuted from 1966 to 1972. After being politically rehabilitated, he was appointed Party Secretary of Longyou Town in Longyou County and later Party Secretary of Qu County.

== Establishing the Yiwu Market ==
In April 1982, Xie was transferred to Yiwu to serve as its Party Secretary. Yiwu, then an impoverished rural county, was historically known for its small traders, who mostly bartered sugar for chicken feathers during the Qing dynasty. However, the Communist Party banned the practice as "capitalist activity" after taking power in 1949. Although the Chinese government initiated the reform and opening policy in 1978, private citizens were still in practice banned from selling goods for profit.

A month after Xie arrived in Yiwu, a street vendor named Feng Aiqian (冯爱倩) complained to him that her goods had been repeatedly confiscated by county authorities and questioned why she was not allowed to sell goods to support her poor family. After their conversation, Xie travelled to Wenzhou, the first Chinese city to allow private enterprises, to conduct research, and concluded that building a free market was compatible with national policies.

In September 1982, Xie announced the establishment of Huqingmen Market (湖清门市场) in Yiwu under the guideline of "four permissions": permissions for farmers to enter the city, to conduct business, to engage in long-haul trading, and to compete with both state enterprises and private individuals. For the first time, a local government in the People's Republic of China legalized a free market for farmers and vendors.

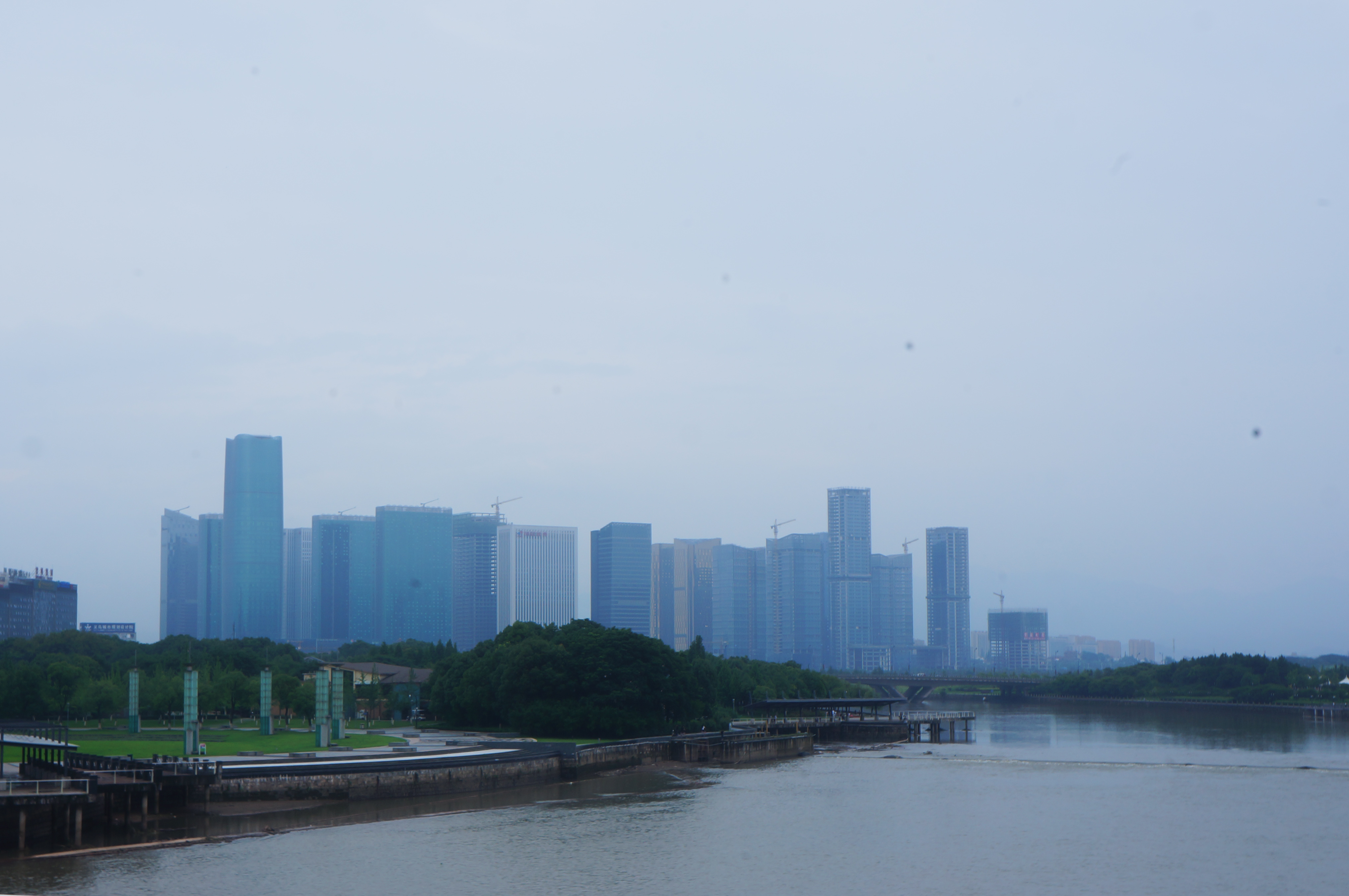
Yiwu International Trade City in 2017

When the market was opened in November 1982, it merely consisted of a few hundred sheds and stalls, but proved highly popular. In 1983, the county government spent 580,000 yuan (US$293,567) to build a new market consisting of booths. By the end of that year, there were more than 1,000 vendors selling over 3,000 products, most of them from outside of Yiwu.

In October 1984, Xie proposed a new development strategy for Yiwu, with market trading as its pillar industry. Although he was transferred out of the county soon afterwards, the Yiwu Market continued its rapid growth and was rebuilt and expanded multiple times. The number of market booths exceeded 10,000 in 1991. In 2005, the United Nations, the World Bank and Morgan Stanley jointly published a report calling it the world's largest small commodities market. By 2013, the market attracted more than 20,000 customers daily from all over the world and sold US$11 billion of goods annually.

== Later life and career ==
After serving in Yiwu for less than three years, Xie was transferred to the prefectural government of Jinhua in December 1984. In 1985, he was appointed Executive Vice Mayor of Quzhou and later served as Vice Chairman of the Quzhou People's Congress. He was elected a delegate to the 8th National People's Congress in 1993. He oversaw the construction of the Wuxi River Irrigation Project (乌溪江引水工程), which benefited numerous farmers in Quzhou and Jinhua. Xie retired in May 1995 and lived in Quzhou.

During China's celebration of the 40th anniversary of the reform and opening era in December 2018, Xie was awarded the honorary title of "Reform Pioneer" by the national government.

Xie died on 23 October 2019, aged 87.
