= Birmingham, Ohio =

There are multiple places named Birmingham in the U.S. state of Ohio:

- Birmingham, Coshocton County, Ohio
- Birmingham, Erie County, Ohio
- Birmingham, Guernsey County, Ohio
