= Birmingham Wholesale Markets =

Produce market in England

Coordinates: 52.5156°N 1.8913°W

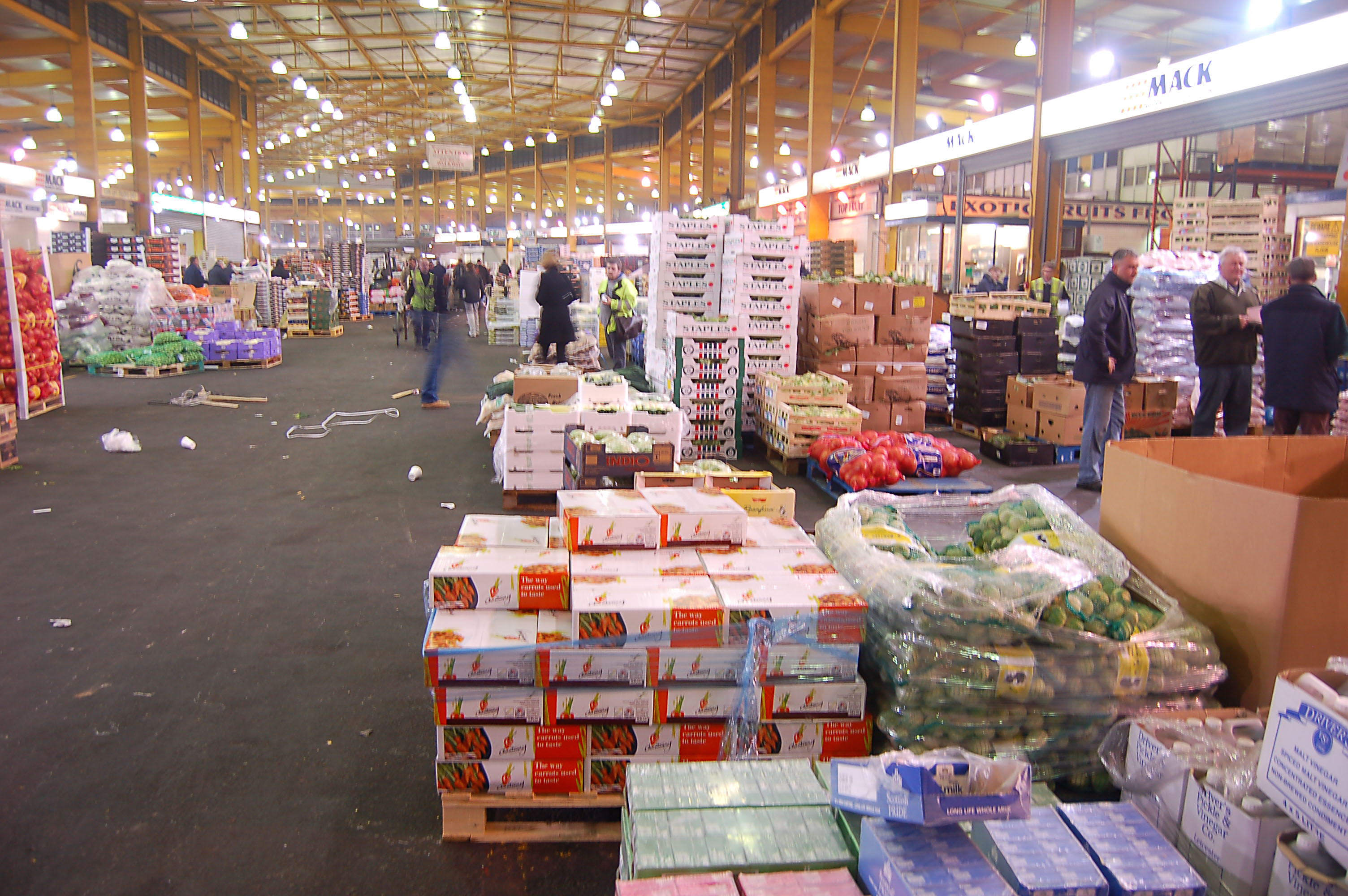
The fruit and vegetable section of the wholesale fresh produce markets at 4am

The Birmingham Wholesale Markets are the largest combined wholesale fresh produce markets in the United Kingdom, with 90 trading units totalling 31,000 m^{2} (330,000 sq ft). Located at The Hub in Witton and easily accessible to the M6 Motorway, they include markets selling meat, fish, poultry, fruit, vegetables and flowers and are run by Birmingham Wholesale Market Company a joint venture between the tenants represented by the Birmingham Wholesale Fresh Produce Association and Birmingham City Council as landlords.

== History ==
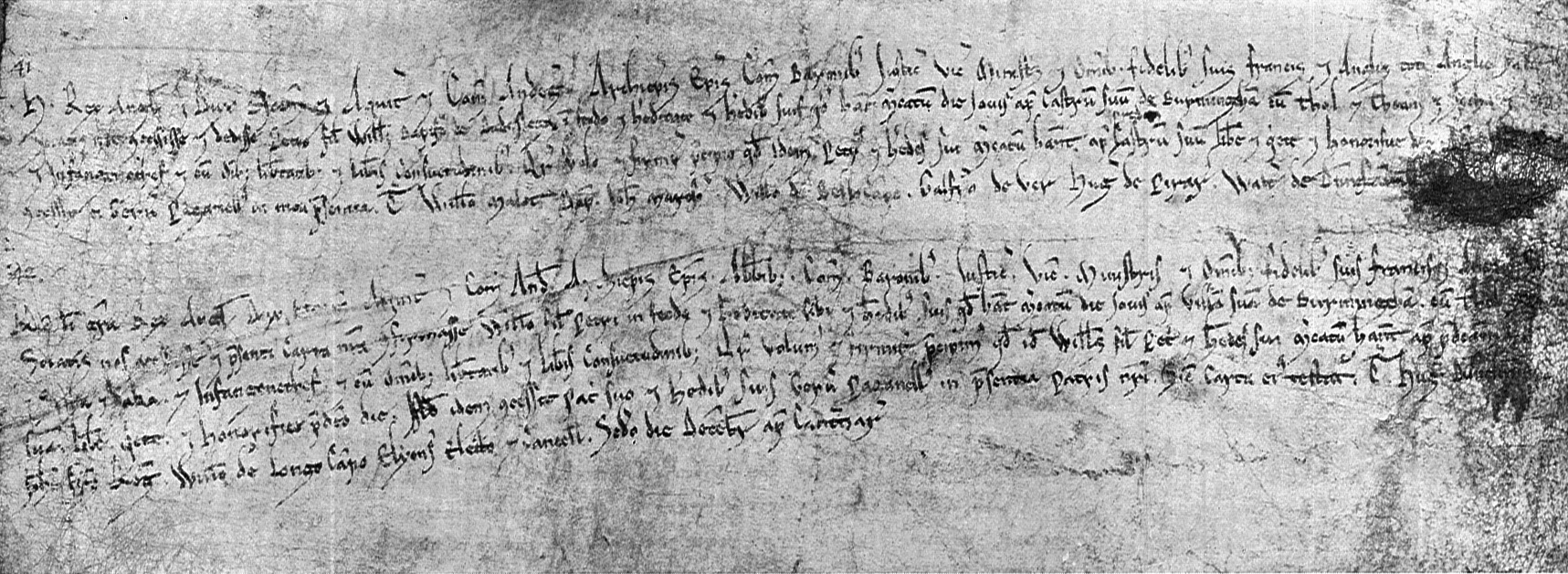
Enrolment of the charters of 1166 and 1189 granting and confirming Birmingham's right to hold a market

Birmingham's wholesale food markets date from 1166, when the Lord of the manor Peter de Birmingham obtained a royal charter permitting him to hold a market at "his castle at Birmingham", though later members of the de Birmingham family claimed that markets in Birmingham had been held since before the Norman Conquest. It was this market that provided the first impetus to the growth of Birmingham as a commercial town from the twelfth century onwards. Until the nineteenth century the markets were held throughout the streets of the centre of the town: a cornmarket and Welsh and English markets selling cattle are recorded in 1553, with butchers shambles and a fish market recorded from the eighteenth century.

The organisation of the market was one of the main concerns of the Birmingham Street Commissioners following their establishment in 1769, with the body taking on responsibility for the collection of tolls in 1806 and buying the marketing rights outright from the Lord of the manor in 1824, before handing responsibility to the Birmingham Corporation in 1854. In the early nineteenth century the clearance of buildings from the Bull Ring allowed the concentration of the markets on the site. In 1817 the Street Commissioners opened the Smithfield market on the site of the Birmingham Manor House, new wholesale fruit and vegetable markets opened on Moat Row in 1883, and the pig and cattle trades moved to a new market in Montague Street between 1892 and 1898. The wholesale fish market in Bell Street was opened in 1869 and extended in 1883, while in 1897 a new meat market with an attached slaughterhouse was opened in Bradford Street.

Increasing congestion in the markets area, coupled with the demolition of the Fish Market for the construction of the Bull Ring Centre in 1958 and the increasing inadequacy of the Smithfield and City Meat markets, led to post-war plans to develop a new wholesale market complex. The first phase of the market buildings opened in February 1974. The building comprised the largest integrated wholesale fresh produce market in the U.K. and the wholesale markets traded on that site until May 2018, when they moved to new purpose built premises at The Hub in Witton, Birmingham B6 7EU. Demolition commenced later.

== Current markets ==
The current market includes a 25,300 m^{2} (272,000 sq ft) horticultural market, a 3,500 m^{2} (38,000 sq ft) meat market and a 3,000 m^{2} (32,000 sq ft) fish and poultry market. The markets are open from 3.30am every day apart from Sunday and receive 13,000 customer visits per week.
