= Birmingham railway =

Birmingham railway may refer to:

== United Kingdom ==
- Grand Junction Railway
- London and Birmingham Railway
- Manchester and Birmingham Railway
- Birmingham and Gloucester Railway
- Shrewsbury and Birmingham Railway
- Birmingham and Derby Junction Railway
- Birmingham West Suburban Railway
- Atlantic and Birmingham Railway
- Birmingham and Bristol Railway
- Atlanta, Birmingham and Atlantic Railway
- Birmingham and Oxford Junction Railway
- Birmingham Railway Carriage and Wagon Company

== United States ==
- Birmingham Terminal Railway
- Birmingham Street Railway
- Birmingham Railway and Electric Company
- Macon and Birmingham Railway
- Atlanta and Birmingham Air Line Railway

== See also ==
- Birmingham railway station (disambiguation)
- Transport in Birmingham (UK)
