= Birmingham Manor House =

Manor building in Birmingham, England

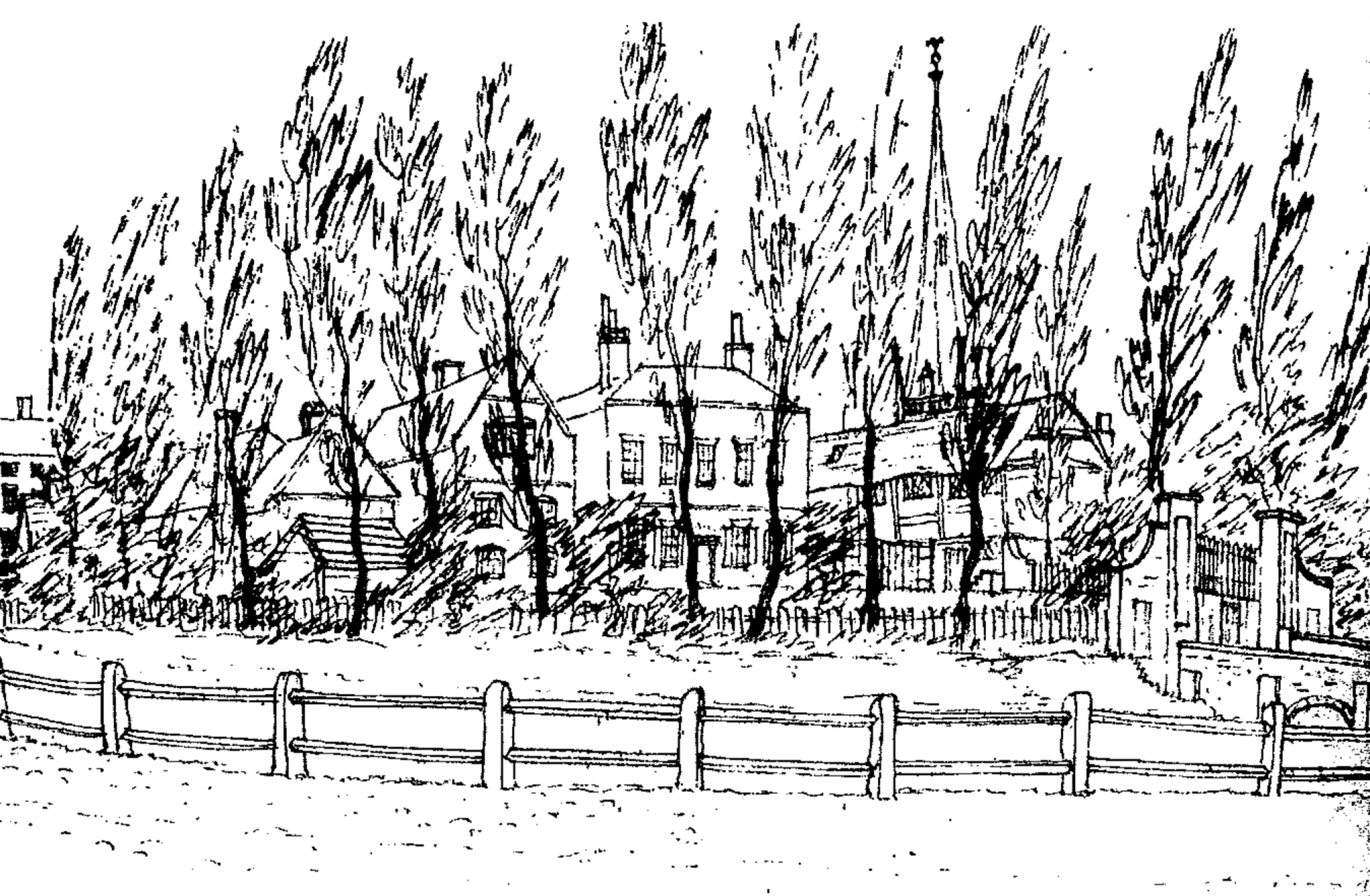
- Birmingham Manor House in 1814 by William Harper
- Former names: Birmingham Moat

General information
- Status: Ruined
- Type: Manor house
- Location: Birmingham Wholesale Markets, Birmingham, United Kingdom
- Coordinates: 52.4747°N 1.8924°W
- Construction started: c. 1166
- Estimated completion: c. 13th century
- Renovated: 16th century
- Closed: 1815
- Demolished: 1816

Design and construction
- Architect: Peter de Birmingham

Renovating team
- Architect: Francis family

The Birmingham Manor House or Birmingham Moat was a moated building that formed the seat of the Lord of the manor of Birmingham, England during the Middle Ages, remaining the property of the de Birmingham family until 1536. The buildings were demolished and the moat filled-in in 1815–16, but the remains of medieval stone structures excavated in 1973–75 survive intact beneath the buildings of the Birmingham Wholesale Markets.

== History ==
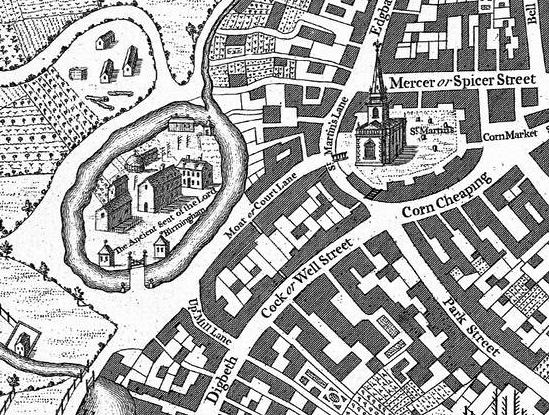
"The Ancient Seat of the Lord of Birmingham", shown with Digbeth and St Martin in the Bull Ring on William Westley's 1731 map of Birmingham

The date of the first settlement of the site is unknown. Although Birmingham's origins lie in the Anglo-Saxon period and the manor of Birmingham definitely existed at the time of the Domesday Book in 1086, no evidence from earlier than the medieval period was found during the archaeological investigations of the site in the 1970s and 2000s. The circular form of the moat suggests 11th or 12th century origins, while the earliest surviving buildings were from the 12th century.

The moat was associated with the castrum mentioned in the royal charter of 1166 that granted Peter de Birmingham the right to hold a market in Birmingham and the entrance to the site pointed away from the centre of the medieval town at the site now known as the Bull Ring, suggesting that it preceded the 12th century development of the town around the marketplace. It was first mentioned in a survey of Birmingham which was undertaken around 1529 when the Medieval moated building was described as being in ruins near the “Bulrynge”, with an outer court also existing at the time.

The Francis family acquired the ruins during 1536 and they demolished the ruins during the Late 16th century and built the second Birmingham Manor House using four buildings on the foundations of the first house using a north to south plan; they kept the dovecote as it was present in 1731. William Harper visited the manor house in 1814, and Birmingham Manor House was demolished in 1815 to allow for the increasing concentration of markets on the site. The moat was filled in by 1816 and the Smithfield market was opened on the site in 1817.

== Excavations ==
Excavations during the construction of the Birmingham Wholesale Markets between 1973 and 1975 discovered the location of Birmingham Manor House, and they also revealed a sandstone wall that included a moulding similar to those found on other sites in the West Midlands such as Sandwell Priory, probably dating it to the 12th century. This wall had been incorporated into a later structure about 11m long and 4m wide with chamfered ashlar stonework – possibly a tower, an oriel window, the base of a stair or the end of a building – with a buttress that indicates a likely thirteenth century date. Further excavations as part of the redevelopment of the Bull Ring in 2000 showed that the moat was 2.5m deep.

== Bibliography ==
- Buteux, Simon (2003), Beneath the Bull Ring: The Archaeology of Life and Death in Early Birmingham, Brewin Books, ISBN 1-85858-242-3
- Hodder, Michael A. (2004), Birmingham: the hidden history, Tempus, ISBN 0-7524-3135-8
- Watts, Lorna (1980), "Birmingham Moat, its History, Topography and Destruction", Transactions, Birmingham and Warwickshire Archaeological Society, 89: 1–77, ISSN 0140-4202
