= John Birmingham (disambiguation) =

John Birmingham (born 1964) is an Australian author.

John Birmingham may also refer to:

- John Birmingham (fl. 1379), MP for Nottinghamshire
- John Birmingham (astronomer) (1816–1884), Irish astronomer
- John Birmingham (politician) (born 1953), Falkland Islands politician

== See also ==
- John Bermingham (1923–2020), American politician
