= Zhejiang Chouzhou Commercial Bank =

Urban commercial bank in China

- Company type: Joint-stock company
- Industry: Financial services
- Founded: 1987
- Headquarters: Yiwu, China
- Area served: Yangtze River Delta Economic Zone

Zhejiang Chouzhou Commercial Bank (Chinese: 浙江稠州商业银行; pinyin: Zhèjiāng Chóuzhōu Shāngyè Yínháng) is an urban commercial bank headquartered in the international trade city of Yiwu, Zhejiang Province, China. The bank also sponsors the Zhejiang Golden Bulls professional basketball team.

== History ==
Established in 1987 as the Yiwu Chouzhou Credit Cooperative, it transitioned into a joint-stock company in 2005 and was formally renamed Zhejiang Chouzhou Commercial Bank in 2006.

As of 2024, the bank reported total assets of approximately RMB 340 billion and operated 276 branches and rural outlets. It provides financial services primarily to small and medium enterprises in the Yangtze River Delta Economic Zone and, in 2023, established the China-Africa Cross-Border RMB Settlement Center in Yiwu to enhance RMB-based trade settlement with African markets.

== China–Africa Cross-Border RMB Settlement Center ==
In May 2023, Zhejiang Chouzhou Commercial Bank established the China–Africa Cross-Border Renminbi Settlement Center in Yiwu. The center aims to expand the use of the Renminbi (RMB) in China–Africa trade, reducing reliance on the United States dollar and decreasing exchange rate risks and costs for traders. The settlement center provides banking services specifically tailored to African merchants in Yiwu, facilitating direct RMB settlements, foreign currency exchange, and trade financing.
