= Yiwu International Trade City =

Chinese wholesale market

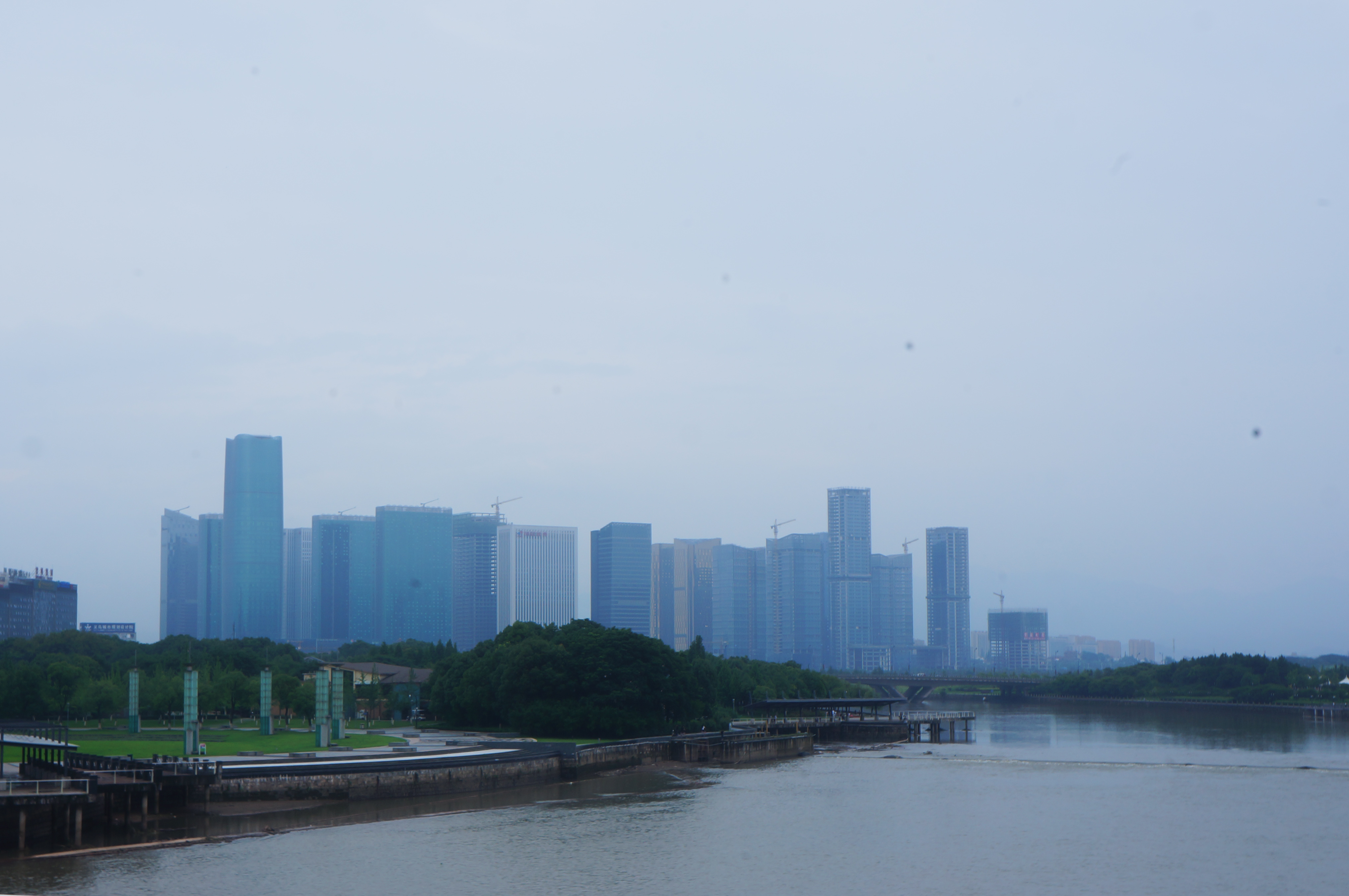
- Yiwu International Trade City in 2017

- Location within China
- Alternative names: China Commodity City

General information
- Type: Wholesale market
- Location: Yiwu, Zhejiang, China
- Coordinates: 29°20′23″N 120°06′40″E
- Inaugurated: 22 October 2002
- Owner: Yiwu Municipal Government

Technical details
- Floor count: 5
- Floor area: 5,500,000 m^{2} (59,000,000 sq ft)

Other information
- Number of stores: 75,000+

Website
- https://yiwugo.com (Chinese) https://g.yiwugo.com (English)

Yiwu International Trade City (Chinese: 义乌国际商贸城), also known as the Yiwu Market, is the world's largest wholesale market for small commodities, located in Yiwu, Zhejiang, China. The market serves as a vital node in global supply chains.

== History ==
In the early 1890s, Yiwu was an impoverished rural county historically known for its small traders, who mostly bartered sugar for chicken feathers during the Qing dynasty. However, the Chinese Communist Party banned the practice as "capitalist activity" after taking power in 1949. Although the Chinese government initiated the reform and opening policy in 1978, selling things for profit by private citizens was still banned in practice.

In April 1982, Xie Gaohua was appointed Party Secretary of Yiwu. A month after his arrival, a street vendor named Feng Aiqian (冯爱倩) complained to him that her goods were repeatedly confiscated by county authorities and questioned why she was not allowed to sell goods to support her poor family. After their conversation, Xie travelled to Wenzhou, the first Chinese city to allow private enterprises, to conduct research, and decided that building a free market was compatible with national policies.

In September 1982, Xie announced the establishment of Huqingmen Market (湖清门市场) in Yiwu under the guideline of "four permissions": permissions for farmers to enter the city, to conduct business, to engage in long-haul trading, and to compete with both state enterprises and private individuals. This was the first time in the People's Republic of China that a local government legalized a free market for farmers.

When the market was opened in November 1982, it merely consisted of a few hundred sheds and stalls, but proved highly popular and grew quickly. In 1983, the county government spent 580,000 yuan (US$293,567) to build a new market consisting of booths. By the end of that year, there were more than 1,000 vendors selling over 3,000 products, most of them from outside of Yiwu.

In October 1984, Xie proposed a new development strategy for Yiwu, with market trading as its pillar industry. Although he was transferred out of the county soon afterwards, the Yiwu Market continued its rapid growth and was rebuilt and expanded multiple times. The number of market booths exceeded 10,000 in 1991. In 2005, the World Bank called it "the world's largest small commodities market", and by 2013, it attracted more than 20,000 customers daily from all over the world and sold US$11 billion of goods annually.

== Layout ==
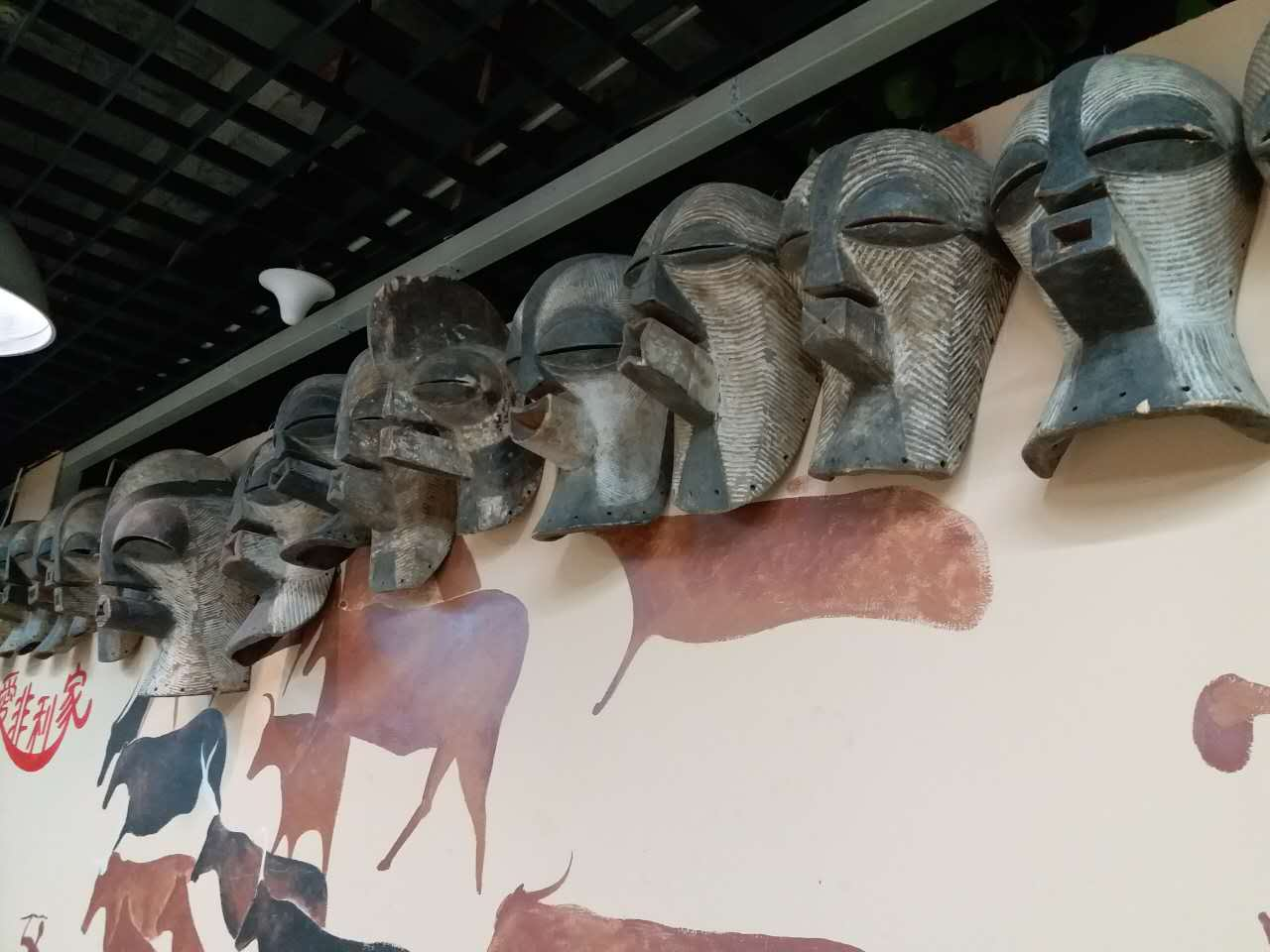
Congolese masks in the Yiwu Africa Products Exhibition Center in District 5

Yiwu International Trade City is a large wholesale market with a complex layout that can take days to explore. A photographer documenting the market told CNN: "I spent a total of four days constantly walking around Yiwu and wouldn't say I got near to seeing all of the stalls."

=== District 1 ===
Opened in 2002, District 1 covers 420 mu with 340,000 m^{2} and over 8,000 booths. It mainly sells toys, plush and inflatable items, jewelry, hair and flower accessories, festival and wedding crafts, porcelain, crystals, and photo frames. Floors are organized by product type, from toys and flowers on Floor 1 to home décor and larger distributors on Floor 4. Services include banks, post offices, logistics, and registration. Around 70% of products are exported.

==== District 1–East ====
[sic]

=== District 2 ===
District 2 opened in 2004, covering 483 mu with 600,000 m^{2} and over 8,000 booths. It specializes in bags, suitcases, umbrellas, hardware, kitchenware, electronics, auto parts, and telecommunication equipment. Floors are organized by product category, with factory outlets and specialty pavilions on upper levels. The district also includes the Innovative Products Display Center and China Commodities History Museum, offices, a hotel, and a shuttle service.

==== District 2 - East ====
[sic]

=== District 3 ===
Opened in 2005, District 3 has 460,000 m^{2} and over 8,000 businesses. It sells buttons, zippers, cosmetics, glasses, pens, paper, office supplies, sporting goods, and arts. Floors 1–3 have smaller booths, while floors 4–5 contain larger showrooms and factory outlets. Services include logistics, e-commerce, Wi-Fi, catering, and accommodation.

=== District 4 ===
District 4 covers 1,080,000 m^{2} with 16,000 booths and 20,000 businesses. Products include daily necessities, knitwear, footwear, belts, scarves, towels, and undergarments. Floors are organized by category, with a tourism shopping and factory outlet center on Floor 5. The district provides logistics, e-commerce, finance, catering, parking, and energy-saving features such as solar power and rainwater recycling.

=== District 5 ===
Opened in 2011, District 5 spans 266.2 mu with 640,000 m^{2} over five floors above ground and two underground. It focuses on imported goods, bedding, fabrics, auto and motorcycle accessories, hotel and festival supplies, and e-commerce services. Floor 5 hosts the National E-commerce Demonstration Base. Facilities include logistics, finance, central air-conditioning, data centers, and parking, combining wholesale trade with some retail and e-commerce functions.
