= Yiwu =

City in Zhejiang, China

Yiwu 义乌市 Iwu
- County-level & Sub-prefectural city
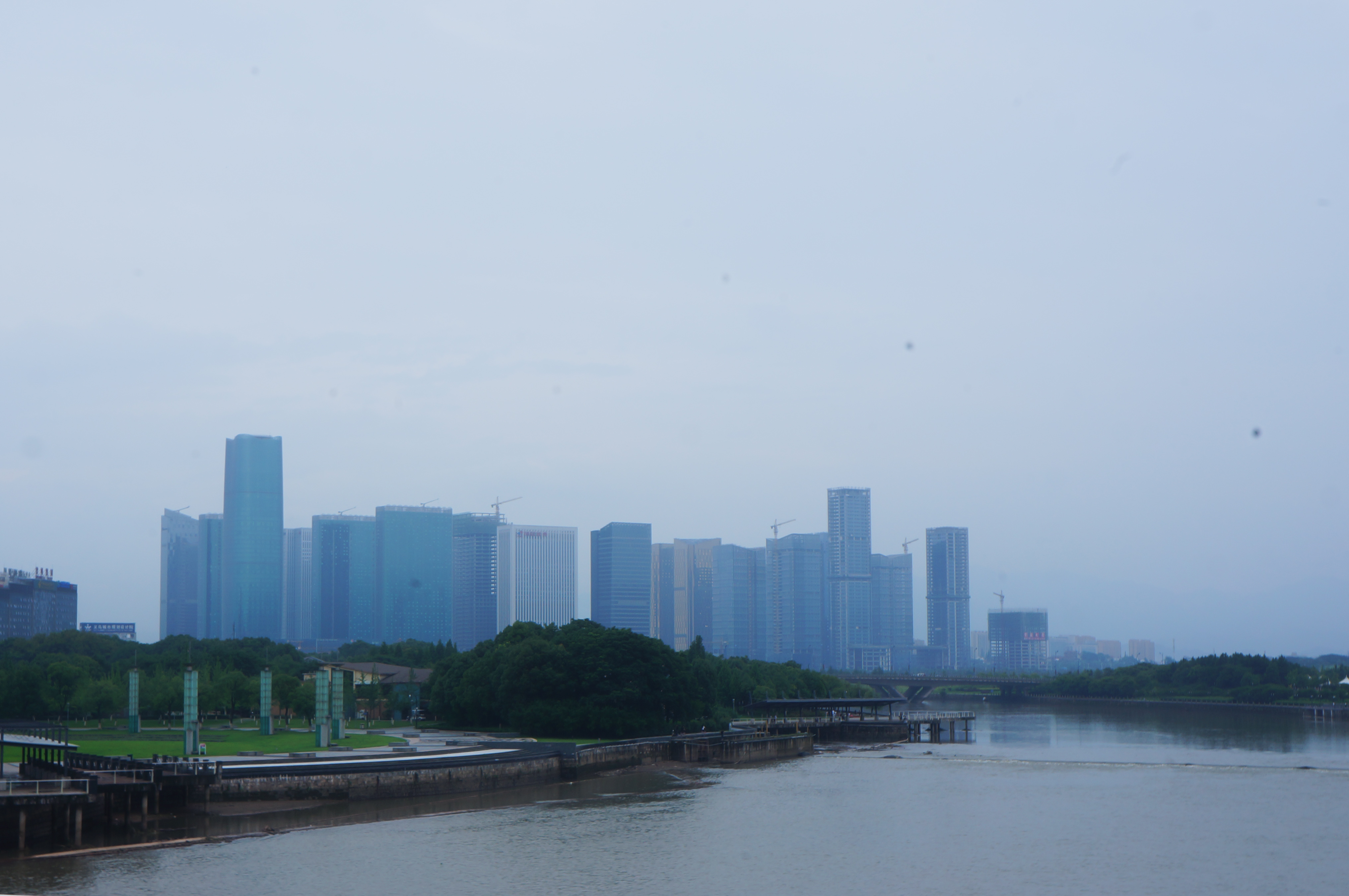
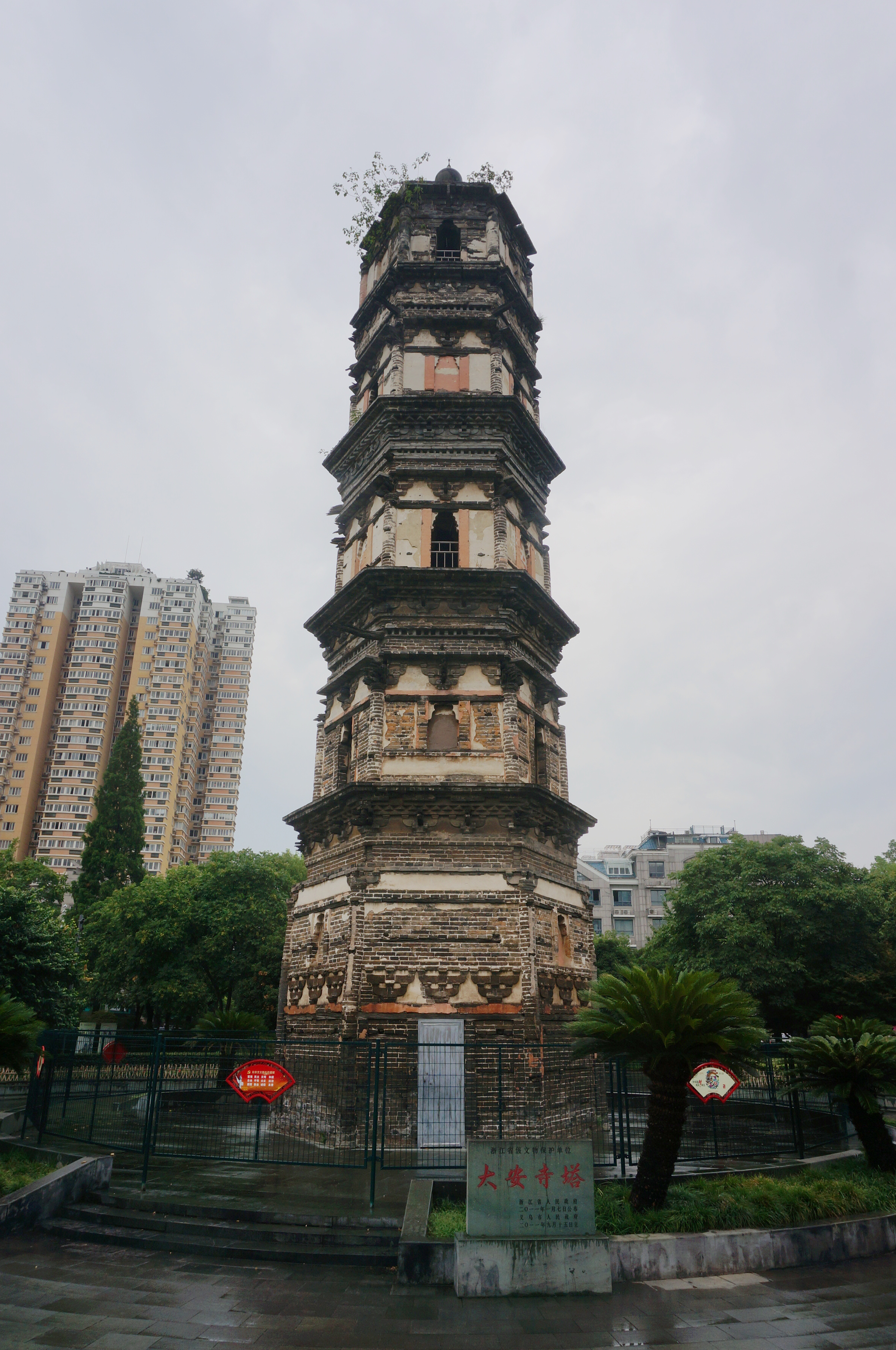
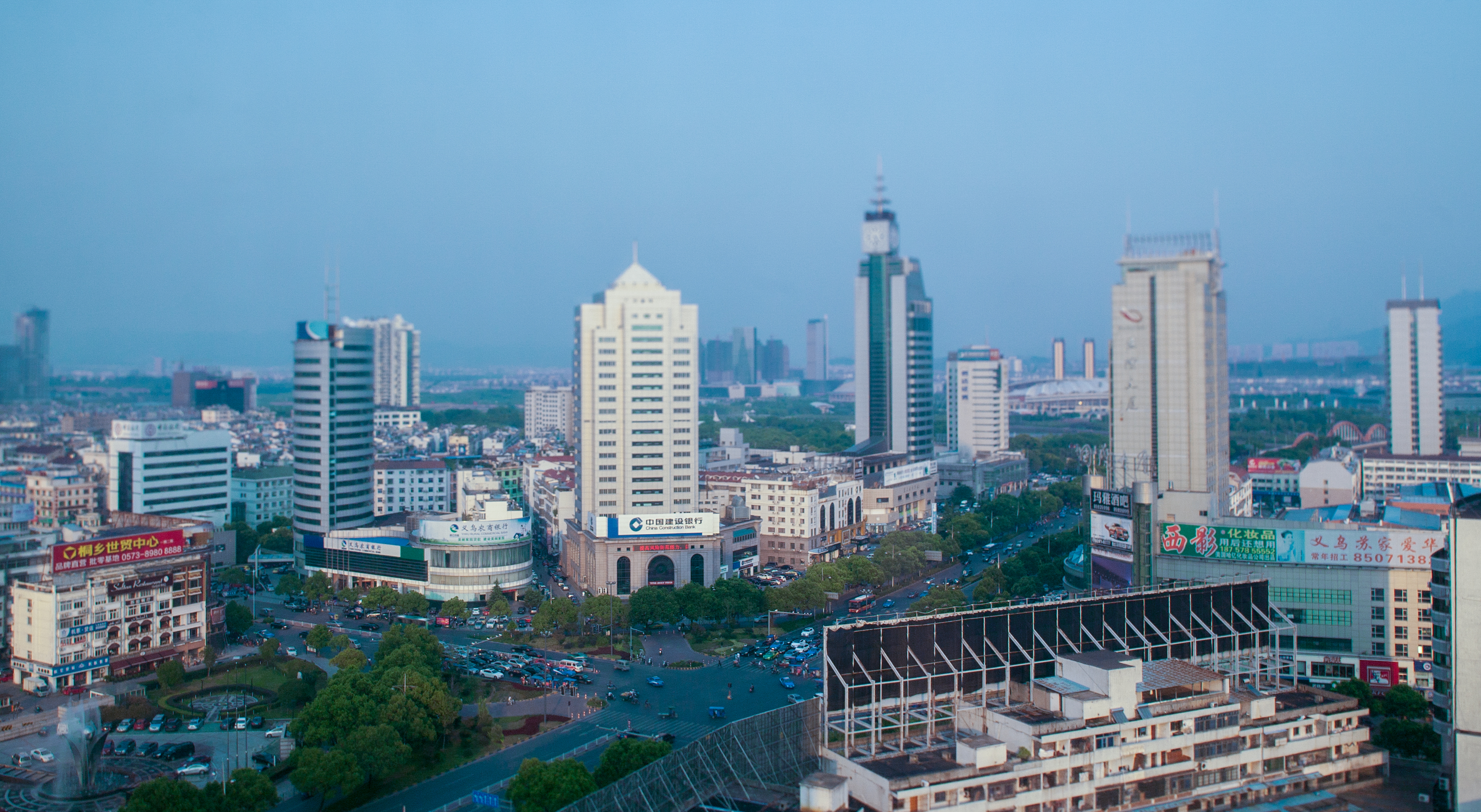
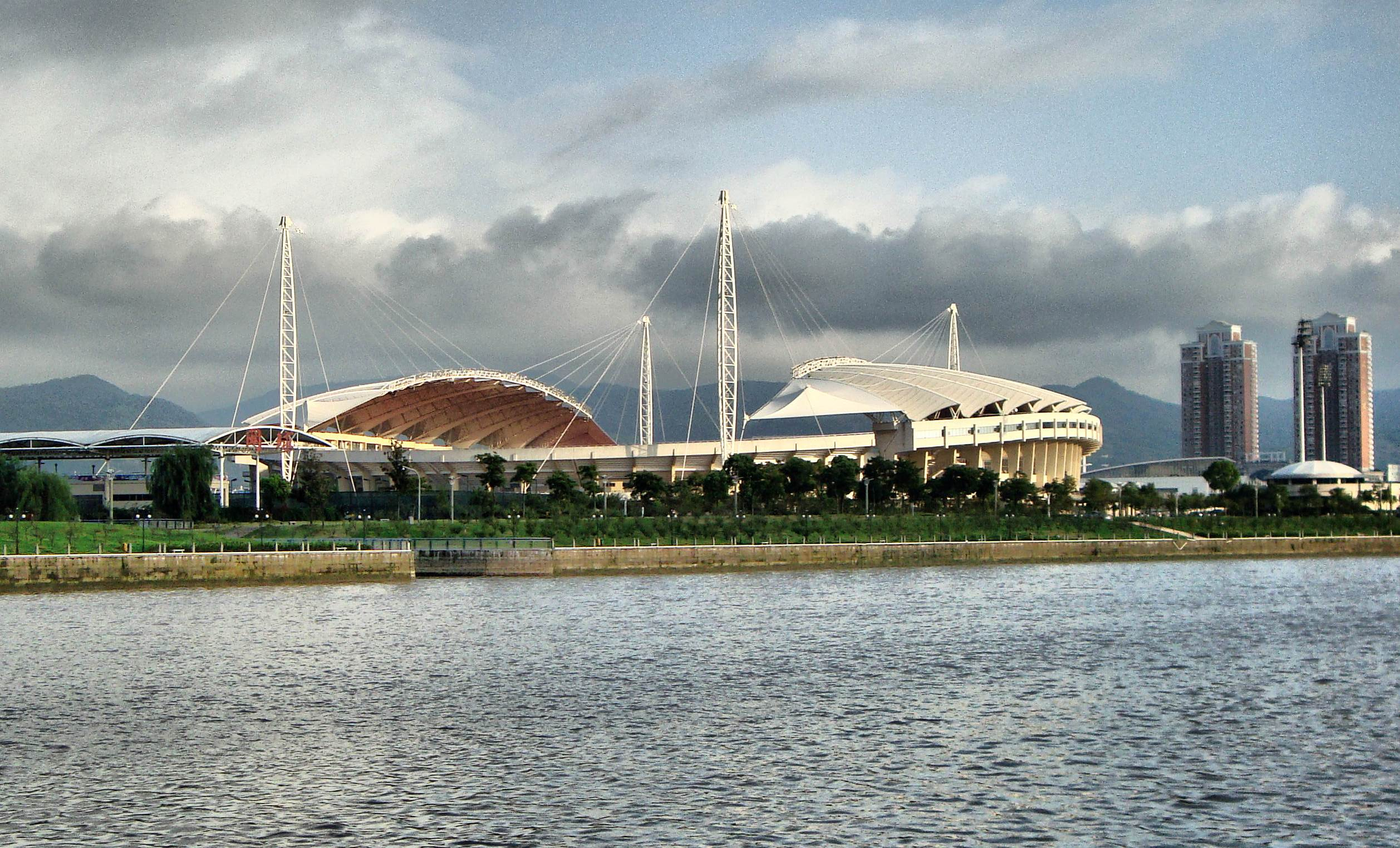
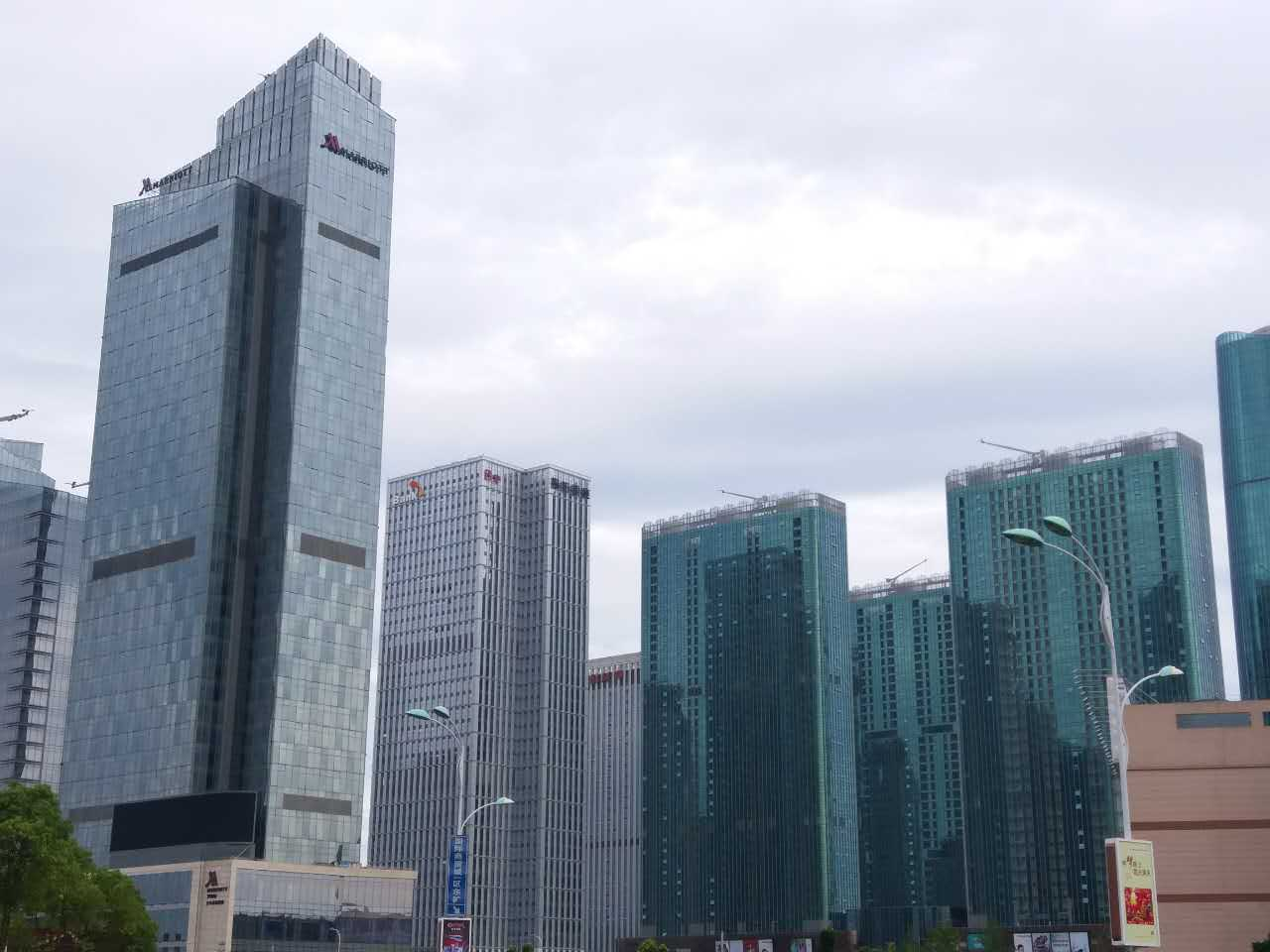
- From top, left to right: Yiwu International Trade City, Da'an Temple pagoda, Downtown Yiwu, Meihu Sports Center, Marriott Hotel Yiwu

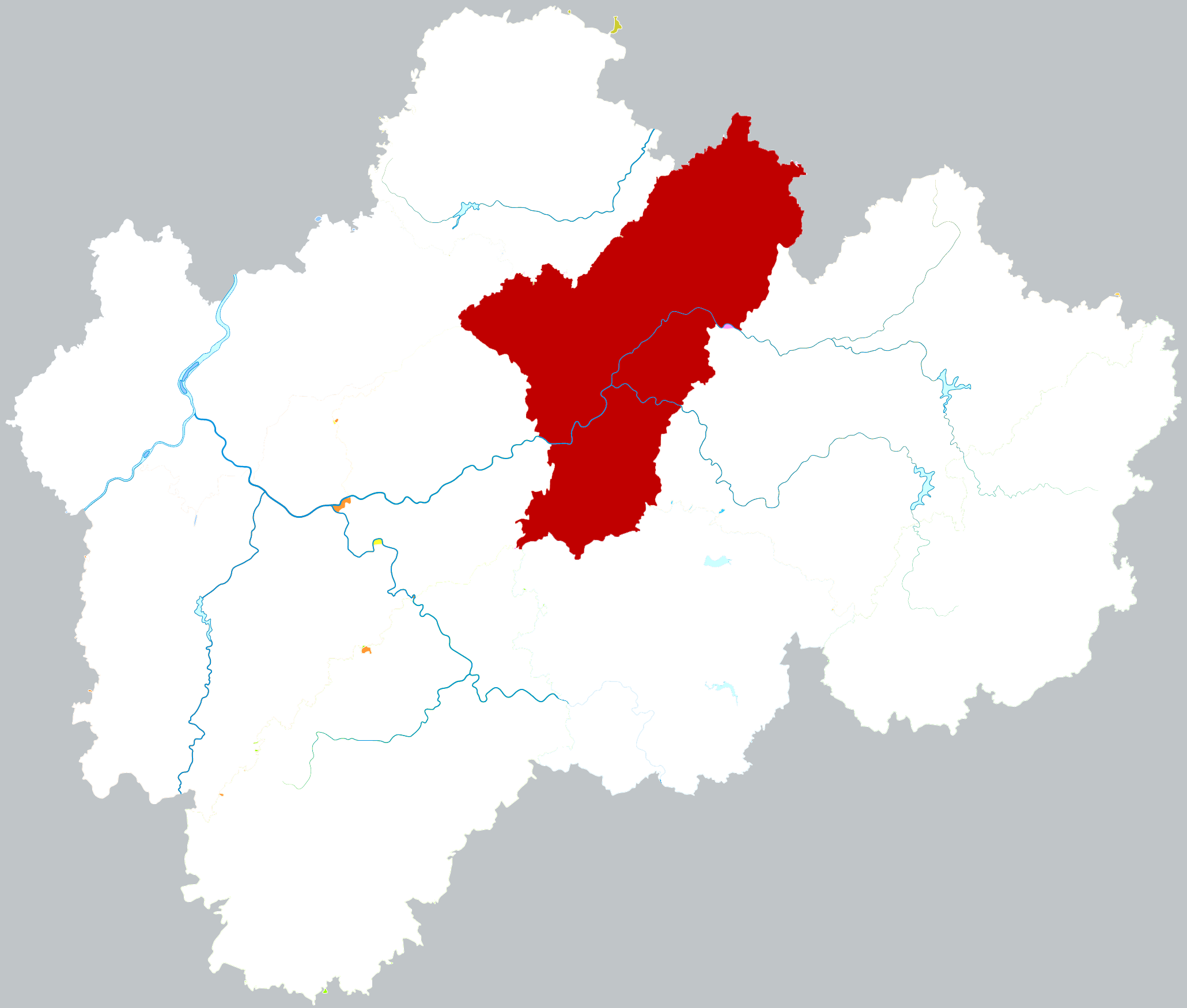
- Location of Yiwu in Jinhua

- Location of Yiwu in Zhejiang Yiwu (China)
- Coordinates: 29°18′25″N 120°04′31″E
- Country: People's Republic of China
- Province: Zhejiang
- Prefecture-level city: Jinhua
- City incorporation: May 1988

Government
  - CCP Secretary: Wang Jian (王健)
  - Mayor: Lin Yi (林毅)

Area
  - Total: 1,105.48 km^{2} (426.83 sq mi)

Population (2020 census)
  - Total: 1,859,390
  - Density: 1,681.98/km^{2} (4,356.30/sq mi)
- Time zone: UTC+8 (China Standard Time)
- Postal code: 322000
- Area code: 0579
- Website: www.yw.gov.cn

Yiwu
- Simplified Chinese: 义乌
- Traditional Chinese: 義烏
- Postal: Iwu
Transcriptions
Standard Mandarin
- Hanyu Pinyin: Yìwū
- Wade–Giles: I-wu

Yiwu is located in southeastern China, in the central part of Zhejiang Province, with Guangdong and Fujian provinces to the south. It is approximately 260 km from Shanghai, China's largest city and economic centre, and 120 km from Hangzhou, the capital of Zhejiang Province. Yiwu trades with more than 200 countries and regions worldwide.

Yiwu is one of China's most economically developed cities. In 2005, the United Nations, World Bank, and Morgan Stanley recognized Yiwu as hosting "the world's largest small commodities market". The city's development has been attributed to a spirit of innovation and exploration among its people, contributing to the growth of its internationally recognized small commodities market.

Its the only international inland port city in East China and its characterized by large-scale infrastructure, including wholesale markets, warehouses, and logistics centers. These facilities make it a hub along the "backroads of globalization". Over the past decade, Yiwu's logistics industry has developed from a local hub into an international node within the global logistics network. During this period, the Belt and Road Initiative (BRI)² and the growth of e-commerce have contributed to changes in the city's spatial configuration and social fabric by influencing transportation corridors (including ports, airports, and intermodal transport facilities), market accessibility, market size, and the region's growth potential.

== History ==
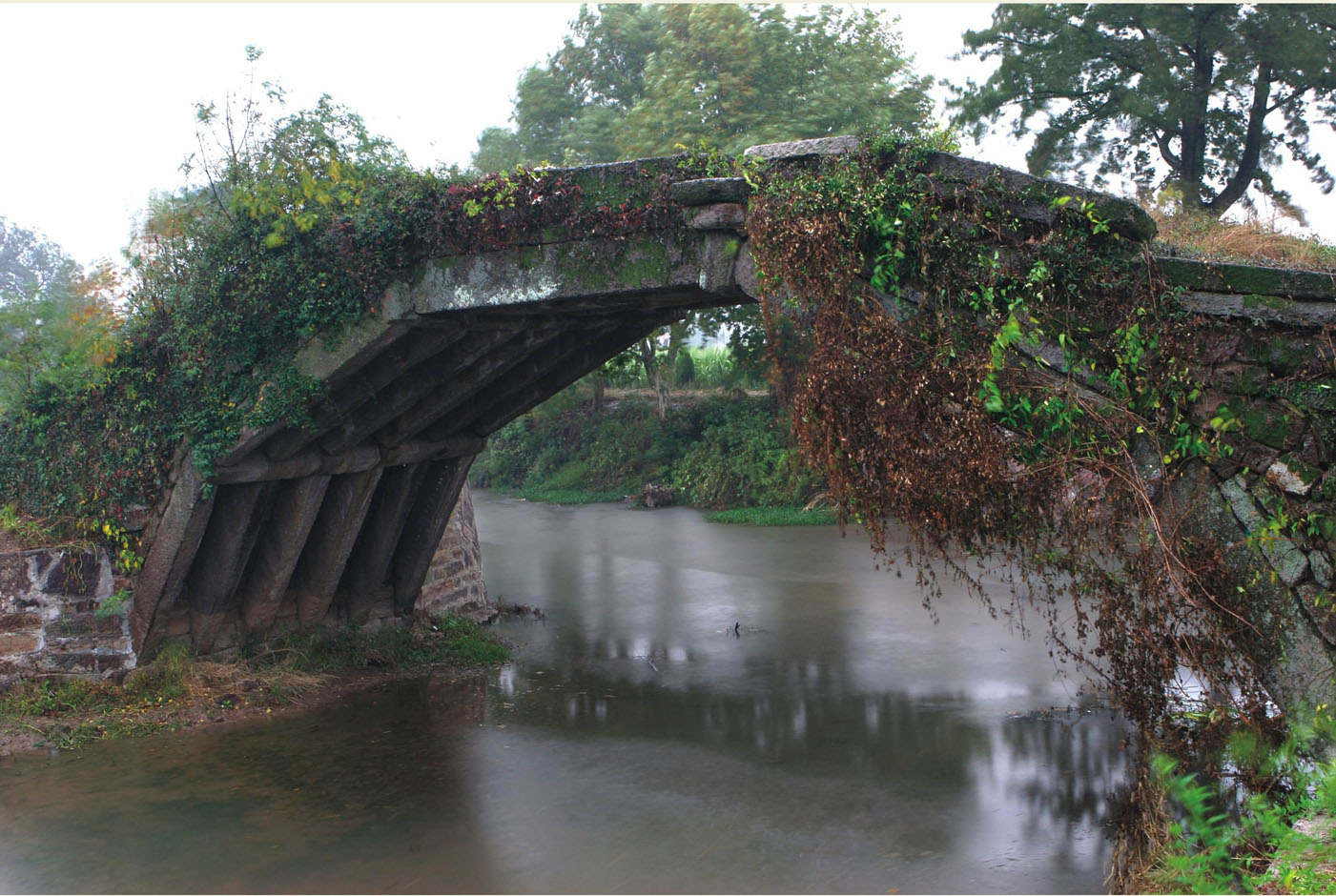
Guyue Bridge, built in 1213

Yiwu was originally established as Wushang City (乌商) in 222 BC during the Qin dynasty. It was renamed Yiwu County in AD 624 under the Tang dynasty. Due to its poor soil and mountainous terrain, Yiwu residents historically relied on trade rather than agriculture.

A long-standing local tradition was the "sugar-for-chicken feathers" barter system (鸡毛换糖), where peddlers exchanged sugar and small goods for chicken feathers used in fertilizer or dusters. Early forms of itinerant and local trading date back to the 16th century, with proto-market activities appearing by the 1700s.

After 1949, private trade was suppressed under the planned economy. Despite restrictions, Yiwu traders continued informally until market reforms began under Deng Xiaoping in 1978. In 1982, the Yiwu government formalized its local market by constructing permanent stalls over a drainage ditch near Huqingmen Street. This became the foundation of what would later be known as the Yiwu International Trade City (义乌国际商贸城), also referred to as the Futian Market.

In 1988, Yiwu was upgraded to a county-level city. Local officials, led by Party Secretary Xie Gaohua, issued trading permits and implemented simplified tax policies, defying national prohibitions at the time.

By the early 1990s, Yiwu had become a national exemplar of bottom-up marketization. In 1992, the central government renamed the city's central wholesale hub to "China Small Commodities City". It was later managed by the state-controlled China Commodities City Group, which oversaw expansions such as zoning goods by category and increasing booth capacity, facilitating global trade.

Yiwu's exports surged after China joined the World Trade Organization in 2001. In 2011, it was designated as a national-level international trade pilot city, with streamlined customs procedures and a unified export tax code specifically for small commodities.

The city further modernized by integrating e-commerce into its traditional market model. Although slow to adopt online sales initially, by 2015, online trading rivaled physical market transactions. Yiwu also became a key node in China's Belt and Road Initiative, with rail freight links to Europe and Central Asia, including the Yiwu-Madrid and Yiwu-London railways.

== Geography ==
Yiwu lies about 100 km south of Hangzhou and borders the city of Dongyang. The terrain is hilly, consistent with central Zhejiang.

The urban layout of Yiwu is closely tied to its function as an international trading hub. Chouzhou Lu, the main thoroughfare connecting the city center to the expansive International Trade City, serves as a major artery that structures the city's commercial and residential spaces. Near the international market, neighborhoods such as Futian Second District and Changchun feature predominantly five-story buildings that integrate residential apartments and commercial offices, popular among traders from Russia, Iran, Azerbaijan, Ukraine, Uzbekistan, Kazakhstan, Turkmenistan, Tajikistan, and Afghanistan. In this district, languages such as Russian, Turkic languages (including Uyghur, Uzbek, Azeri, Turkmen, and Kazakh), and Persian are commonly heard.

Moving towards the city center along Chouzhou Lu, notable landmarks like the Jimao and Jimei Towers host offices mainly utilized by Afghan traders. Nearby, clusters of commercial buildings cater predominantly to Indian traders, interspersed with markets specializing in products such as Christmas decorations, LED lights, jewelry, beads, and various household items.

Closer to the core of Yiwu, the influence of Middle Eastern traders becomes increasingly pronounced. This neighborhood is notable for Arabic signage and shops selling goods oriented toward Muslim traders and consumers, creating a distinctive Middle Eastern cultural presence within Yiwu's urban landscape.

=== Climate ===
Climate data for Yiwu, elevation 90 m (300 ft), (1991–2020 normals, extremes 1981–present)
Month	Jan	Feb	Mar	Apr	May	Jun	Jul	Aug	Sep	Oct	Nov	Dec	Year
Record high °C (°F)	24.0 (75.2)	28.9 (84.0)	34.7 (94.5)	34.7 (94.5)	37.1 (98.8)	38.4 (101.1)	42.0 (107.6)	42.8 (109.0)	39.3 (102.7)	35.4 (95.7)	31.3 (88.3)	25.4 (77.7)	42.8 (109.0)
Mean daily maximum °C (°F)	9.5 (49.1)	12.3 (54.1)	16.7 (62.1)	23.0 (73.4)	27.6 (81.7)	29.8 (85.6)	34.6 (94.3)	33.8 (92.8)	29.2 (84.6)	24.2 (75.6)	18.6 (65.5)	12.2 (54.0)	22.6 (72.7)
Daily mean °C (°F)	5.6 (42.1)	7.8 (46.0)	11.9 (53.4)	17.8 (64.0)	22.7 (72.9)	25.6 (78.1)	29.9 (85.8)	29.2 (84.6)	24.9 (76.8)	19.6 (67.3)	13.9 (57.0)	7.8 (46.0)	18.1 (64.5)
Mean daily minimum °C (°F)	2.8 (37.0)	4.6 (40.3)	8.3 (46.9)	13.8 (56.8)	18.8 (65.8)	22.4 (72.3)	26.2 (79.2)	25.7 (78.3)	21.6 (70.9)	16.0 (60.8)	10.5 (50.9)	4.6 (40.3)	14.6 (58.3)
Record low °C (°F)	−8.2 (17.2)	−5.1 (22.8)	−2.3 (27.9)	2.5 (36.5)	8.5 (47.3)	12.9 (55.2)	18.3 (64.9)	18.9 (66.0)	12.3 (54.1)	3.8 (38.8)	−1.2 (29.8)	−9.1 (15.6)	−9.1 (15.6)
Average precipitation mm (inches)	80.6 (3.17)	83.2 (3.28)	143.0 (5.63)	143.6 (5.65)	155.6 (6.13)	272.9 (10.74)	133.7 (5.26)	145.1 (5.71)	90.0 (3.54)	49.7 (1.96)	64.7 (2.55)	59.1 (2.33)	1,421.2 (55.95)
Average precipitation days (≥ 0.1 mm)	12.4	12.4	16.1	14.8	14.6	16.2	11.8	12.6	10.3	7.1	10.0	9.5	147.8
Average snowy days	3.9	3.4	0.9	0	0	0	0	0	0	0	0.1	1.8	10.1
Average relative humidity (%)	74	73	71	69	69	77	68	70	73	70	72	71	71
Mean monthly sunshine hours	95.2	98.9	116.8	140.1	153.3	128.3	223.8	209.7	157.8	154.6	122.7	117.8	1,719
Percentage possible sunshine	29	31	31	36	36	31	53	52	43	44	39	37	39
Source: China Meteorological Administration all-time extreme temperature

== Administration ==
Yiwu is part of Jinhua prefecture and administers 7 subdistricts and 6 towns.

=== Subdistricts ===
- Choucheng, Beiyuan, Choujiang, Jiangdong, Houzhai, Chengxi, Niansanli

=== Towns ===
- Shangxi, Yiting, Fotang, Chi'an, Suxi, Dachen

== Economy ==
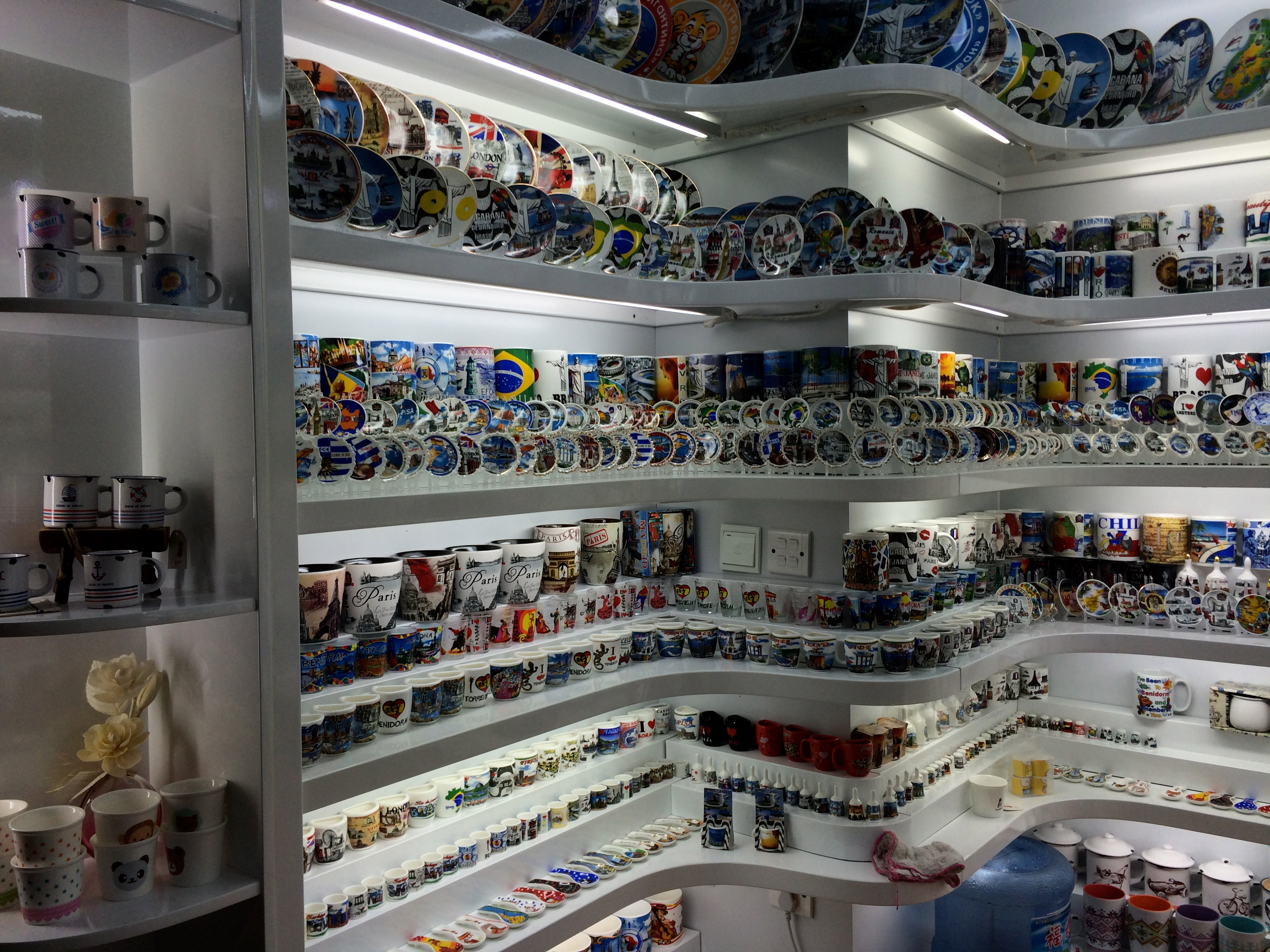
Tourist goods for wholesale around the world in Yiwu International Trade Mart

Yiwu is a global trading hub for small commodities. The Yiwu International Trade City, operated by Zhejiang China Commodities City Group Co., Ltd. (SHA:600415), is the world's largest wholesale market. It is organized into several districts, each dedicated to categories like jewelry, toys, home goods, and textiles. According to The Economist, more than 60% of Christmas trinkets sold globally in 2013 originated from Yiwu.

Today, the Yiwu Market occupies a physical marketplace of over four million square meters, where 1.7 million types of consumer products, including handicrafts, toys, hardware, electronics, sporting goods, clothing and accessories, are bought and sold daily. Approximately 70 percent of its sales are exported to over 200 countries. Due to Yiwu's significance in international trade, special customs checkpoints were established in 2006 to expedite customs procedures. Yiwu also has its own airport and operates high-speed train services to major cities such as Shanghai and Hangzhou.

Yiwu also supports a growing e-commerce sector. Since 2001, Alibaba's business-to-business (B2B) model has influenced trade in the city, with the first group of online merchants contributing to its development. Following the 2008 international financial crisis, "Taobao villages" emerged in Yiwu. The Yiwu International Trade City was also increasingly integrated with e-commerce, while the internationalization of the Yiwu small commodity market continued to develop. In 2011, for example, 444,000 overseas businesspeople from 209 countries and regions visited Yiwu to purchase commodities. The development of e-commerce and the internationalization of Yiwu provided opportunities for poverty reduction and economic development. For example, in Qingyan Liu village in Yiwu, rent was the main source of income for most villagers in 2008. As businesspeople moved away, the number of vacant houses increased, undermining the village economy. Subsequently, the village took advantage of opportunities arising from e-commerce development and attracted more than 15,000 people from across China engaged in online sales and related industries, as well as more than 3,200 registered online stores. Qingyan Liu village is also known as the "first village of online stores" in China.

Since 2023, Yiwu has strengthened its financial infrastructure to promote the international use of the Chinese yuan. Zhejiang Chouzhou Commercial Bank established the China-Africa Cross-Border RMB Settlement Center, while the city launched the Yiwu Pay digital payment platform, both significantly facilitating cross-border RMB transactions with local currencies.

== Culture and Globalization ==
Yiwu has undergone a transformation into a globalized urban space through its unique position as the world's largest wholesale market for small commodities. The city has developed into an international hub, drawing hundreds of thousands of traders annually from Africa, the Arab world, and Southeast Asia. As researchers Saïd Belguidoum and Olivier Pliez observe, Yiwu is both "an industrial district and a cosmopolitan urban space," functioning as a nexus of grassroots globalization through trade, migration, and transnational networks. The case of Yiwu illustrates a unique model of globalization: one driven not by elite capital cities but by bottom-up commercial and social dynamics fostered by small traders, local governance, and flexible urban policies.

The city hosts a diverse resident population, including Arabs, Muslims from across the globe, and traders from sub-Saharan Africa. In 2010, it was estimated that 70% of Yiwu's 11,000 foreign residents were from the Middle East and North Africa, and over 200,000 traders from those regions visited the city annually.

A prominent symbol of Yiwu's multicultural fabric is "Exotic Street" (三毛区), locally known as Maedah, named after the first Egyptian restaurant in the area. This neighborhood has grown into a thriving enclave with Arabic signage, halal restaurants, Islamic bookstores, and freight-forwarding agencies catering to Arab and Muslim traders. It also serves as a social center where wholesalers from different national and cultural backgrounds gather, especially in the evenings after market hours.

== Education ==
Yiwu hosts several institutions of higher education, including Yiwu Industrial & Commercial College and the Yiwu campus of China University of Metrology. Prominent secondary schools in the city include Yiwu High School, Yiwu Second Senior High School, and Yiwu Qunxing Foreign Language School.

Reflecting its diverse international community, Yiwu also features foreign schools managed by international residents to serve the children of traders from various cultural backgrounds. Notable among these are the Chinese–Egyptian Modern School and Rainbow Kids Preschool near Yiwu's central mosque. The latter is staffed by teachers of Muslim backgrounds including foreigners, Hui, Uyghur, and Han Chinese converts to Islam and incorporates Islamic educational materials such as electronic books designed for memorizing the Qurʾān.

== Transportation ==
=== Air ===
Yiwu Airport is classified as a 4C-grade regional airport and offers direct flights to major Chinese cities including Beijing, Guangzhou, Shenzhen, and Chengdu.

=== High-speed rail ===
Yiwu is served by the Yiwu railway station, which lies on the Hangzhou–Changsha high-speed railway, part of the Shanghai–Kunming high-speed railway. The station provides frequent high-speed services to major cities such as Hangzhou, Shanghai, Nanchang, and Changsha.

=== Highways and expressways ===
Yiwu is well integrated into the regional road network. It is connected to major urban centers through the Hangzhou–Jinhua–Quzhou Expressway and the Jinhua–Yiwu–Dongyang Expressway, both of which are part of the National Trunk Highway System. These expressways facilitate rapid access to Hangzhou, Jinhua, Quzhou, and other cities in Zhejiang and neighboring provinces.

=== Rail freight ===
Yiwu serves as the eastern terminus of the Yiwu–Madrid railway line, the longest goods railway in the world, spanning over 13,000 km through Central Asia and Europe. Yiwu is a major domestic hub in the China-Europe railway, which is developed through the Belt and Road Initiative.

The Yiwu–Madrid route, also known as the Yixin'ou China-Europe freight train, marked its 10th anniversary in November 2024. As of that date, over 6,700 trains had departed from Yiwu, delivering approximately 670,000 containers, with the Yiwu–Madrid route accounting for 1,800 round trips and over 145,000 containers transported. Commodities transported include daily necessities, mechanical equipment, and car parts. The line has become emblematic of China's commitment to open trade and connectivity and is frequently cited as a symbol of multilateralism amid global geopolitical tensions.

=== Metro ===
The Jinhua Rail Transit metro system began operations in Yiwu in 2022, offering a connection to the neighboring city. Its coverage within Yiwu itself is limited and does not currently serve as a primary mode of local urban transportation.

== Twin towns – sister cities ==
Yiwu is twinned with:

- Jaworzno, Poland
- Manisa, Turkey
- Orsha, Belarus
- Sulaimanyiah - Slemani, Iraq
- Kavadarci, North Macedonia

== Notable people ==
- Chen Wangdao, first Chinese translator of the Communist Manifesto
- Wu Han, historian and former deputy mayor of Beijing
- Eric Chu, Kuomintang politician
- Ho Iat Seng, Chief Executive of Macau
