= Thérèse Bermingham =

Irish Scouting executive

Thérèse Bermingham from Killiney, Ireland was one of 12 elected volunteer members and former Vice-Chairman of the World Scout Committee, one of the most senior roles in the main executive body of the World Organization of the Scout Movement.

In 2007, Bermingham attended the 21st World Scout Jamboree and joined 350 young people-a boy and a girl from almost every country-for a sunrise ceremony at Brownsea Island, off the coast of Dorset to mark the centenary of Scouting.

In 2015, she was awarded the 344th Bronze Wolf, the only distinction of the World Organization of the Scout Movement, awarded by the World Scout Committee for exceptional services to world Scouting.

Bermingham is a tax advisor serving Dublin.
