= Debra Bermingham =

American painter

- Born: September 18, 1953; Northampton, Massachusetts
- Spouse: Kim Engle

Debra Bermingham is an American artist known for her interior scenes and still lifes.

== Biography ==
Debra Pandell Bermingham was born in Northampton, Massachusetts on September 18, 1953. She was educated at the University of Washington, Seattle, and Cornell University in Ithaca, New York.

She has held teaching positions at the University of Washington, Hobart College, Cornell University, and Ithaca College.

== Work ==
Bermingham paints realistic interiors. Everyday objects are rendered strange and lyrical by her odd compositions and fuzzy lighting. The results are enigmatic little scenes not clarified by their equally puzzling titles. She describes the rationale for her subject matter thus: "Finding the edge between the compelling atmosphere of an image from memory and an image from dream is the crux of my painting."

Many of her works are still lifes with diminutive objects dwarfed by the surrounding spaces. Like Giorgio Morandi (who is often mentioned in discussion of her work), Bermingham uses a limited collection of objects that she arranges in various combinations and settings; toys, marionettes, chairs, birdcages, and butterflies are among her favorite subjects. Her figures gaze intently at the viewer. A harlequin or clown appears in several paintings; describing one such figure in an exhibition review, Gerrit Henry asks, "Is man essentially a puppet of the gods, or of the artist?"

Bermingham favors limited palettes, working in transparent layers to create subtle color. Her process is meticulous and time-consuming; she is not a prolific artist.

The most distinctive characteristic of her painting might be her portrayal of transfused light. Reagan Upshaw describes it as "chilly luminescence" and connects her work to Luminism (American art style).

She also paints landscapes, which were called reviewer "evocatively grim," with "jaundiced" color by one reviewer.

== Collections ==
Bermingham's works are held in the collections of:

- the Art Institute of Chicago,
- the Kalamazoo Institute of Art,
- the Brooklyn Museum of Art, and
- the Smith College Museum of Art.

== Awards ==
- Louise Nevelson Award in Art, American Academy of Arts and Letters (1996)
- University of Rochester, Memorial Art Gallery, Louis D'Amanda Memorial Award (1985)
- Cornell University, Charles Goodwin Sands Memorial Medal (1976)
- Cornell University, Edith and Walter King Stone Memorial Prize (1975)
