= Birmingham Township =

Birmingham Township, Pennsylvania could refer to:

- Birmingham Township, Chester County, Pennsylvania
- Birmingham Township, Schuyler County, Illinois
- Chadds Ford Township, Pennsylvania (formerly Birmingham Township, Delaware County, Pennsylvania prior to 1996)
