= Brendon Bermingham =

Australian rules footballer, born 1914

Personal information
- Full name: Brendon Doyle Bermingham
- Born: 26 May 1914; Traralgon, Victoria
- Died: 10 December 1975 (aged 61); Tambellup, Western Australia
- Original team: Claremont (WAFL) / Mines Rovers (GFL)
- Height: 187 cm (6 ft 2 in)
- Weight: 91 kg (201 lb)

Playing career^{1}
| Years | Club | Games (Goals) |
| 1944 | St Kilda | 8 (1) |
- ^{1} Playing statistics correct to the end of 1944.

Brendon Doyle Bermingham (26 May 1914 – 10 December 1975) was an Australian rules footballer who played with St Kilda in the Victorian Football League (VFL).
