= Birmingham Motors =

American automobile company

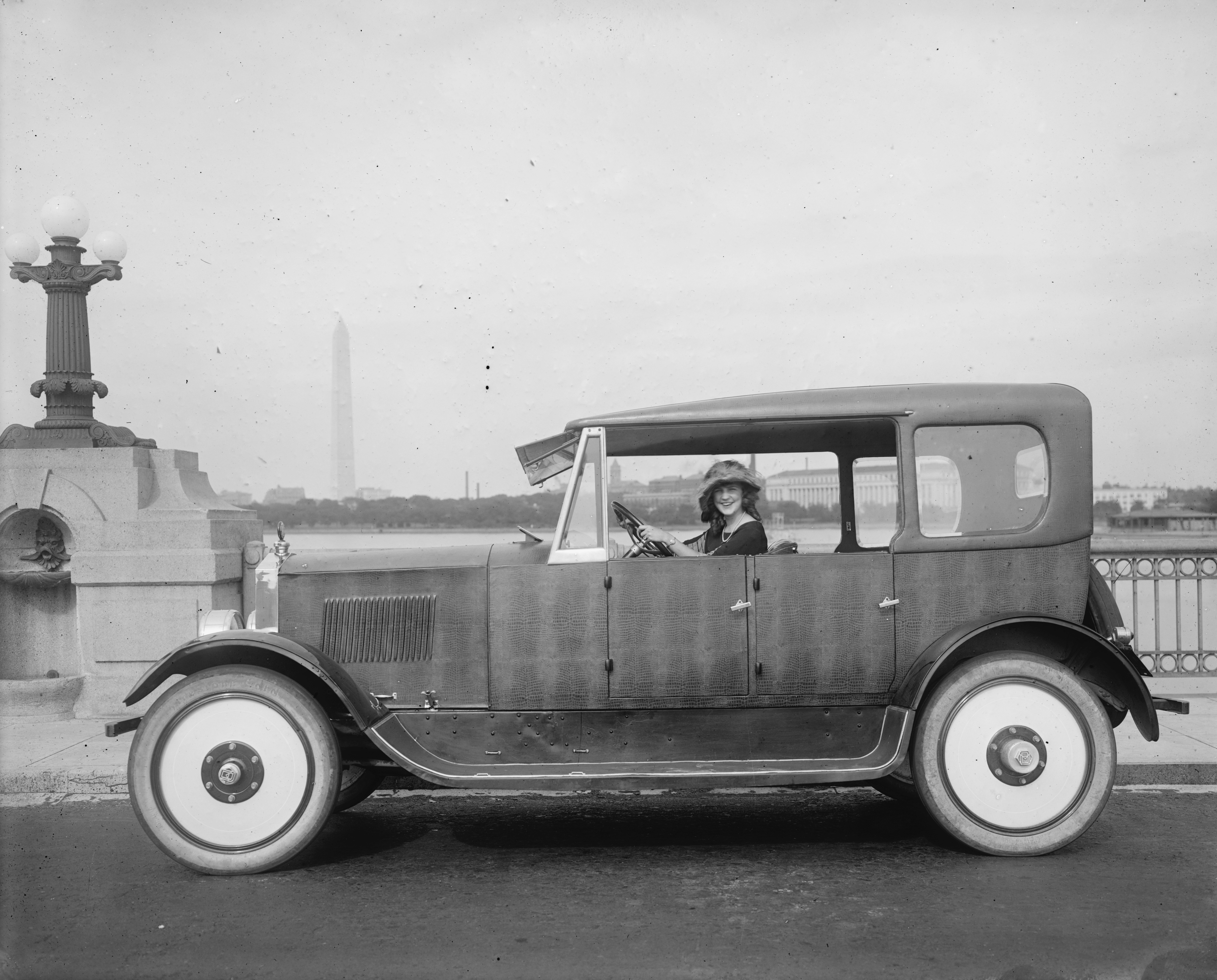
Margaret Gorman driving a Birmingham in 1921

Birmingham Motors was a United States–based automobile company. Organized in 1920, it was tentatively in business only from 1921 through 1923.

The Birmingham offered a number of unusual features, including a type of swing axle suspension and exterior finishes of DuPont Fabrikoid instead of paint.

Failure to generate capital for factory investment hobbled Birmingham. A political scandal involving the mayor of Jamestown, New York, who was the company's titular president resulted in Birmingham Motors going out of business. Only about 50 Birmingham autos were built; none of which are known to have survived to the 21st century.
