= Bermingham (surname) =

Bermingham is the Gaelicised version of 'De Birmingham' and is descended from the family of Warwickshire, England. The Irish version of the name Mac Feorais/Mac Fheorais is derived from Pierce de Bermingham (died 1307). The first recorded Bermingham in Ireland, Robert de Bermingham (son of William) accompanied Richard de Clare or 'Strongbow' in Henry II's conquest of Ireland in 1172. On arrival he received: "an ancient monument, valued at 200 pounds, on which was represented in brass the landing of the first ancestor of the family of Birmingham in Ireland."

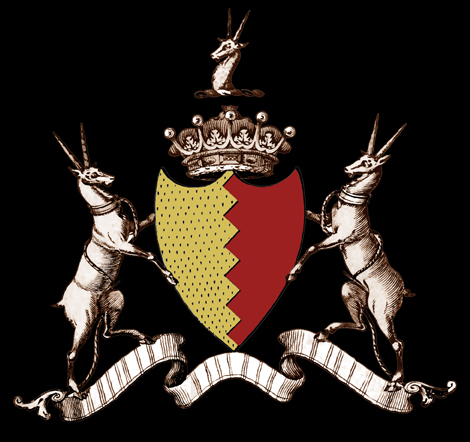
Bermingham Family Coat of Arms (18th century )

The family settled initially in Galway in the west of the country and later in Kildare in the east. Myler de Bermingham founded the town and abbey of Athenry, Galway in 1240. The Pierce de Bermingham mentioned above held a castle at Carrick in county Kildare and is noted in history for murdering over twenty of the O' Connors clan at a feast he held there in 1305. For this 'notorious' act he earned the title of the 'Treacherous Baron'. Lord Richard de Bermingham was victorious in the Second Battle of Athenry in 1316. Richard's cousin John Earl of Louth defeated Edward Bruce at the Battle of Faughart in 1318. He was subsequently murdered along with over 150 relatives and guests during the Braganstown Massacre in 1329.

The Peerage title of Baron of Athenry/Lord Athenry (one of the oldest titles on record in Ireland and Britain) was held by the Berminghams of Galway from the time of their arrival until 1799. Thomas Bermingham, the last Baron of Athenry and Earl of Louth died without a male heir that year and the title became extinct. The title Earl of Louth was held by two Berminghams, John (1329) and Thomas and also became extinct upon Thomas's death. A number of appeals were made by Bermingham descendants between 1800 and 1830 to the House of Lords to re-establish the Baron of Athenry title but these appeals were unsuccessful as no direct male line could be established.

== See also ==
- De Birmingham family
