= Birmingham station =

Birmingham station may refer to:

== United Kingdom ==
- Birmingham station group, the main stations in Birmingham, England
- Birmingham Coach Station, a coach station in Digbeth, Birmingham, England
- Birmingham Curzon Street railway station (1838-1966) (closed), originally known as just "Birmingham"

== United States ==
- Birmingham station (Alabama), a train station in Birmingham, Alabama serving Amtrak
- Birmingham station (Michigan), a former train station in Birmingham, Michigan serving Amtrak
- Birmingham Terminal Station, a former train station in Birmingham, Alabama
