= Birmingham, Coshocton County, Ohio =

Coordinates: 40°17′22″N 81°43′01″W

Birmingham is a ghost town in Lafayette Township in Coshocton County, in the U.S. state of Ohio.

== History ==
Birmingham was laid out in 1830 when the canal was extended to that point.
