= John Bermingham =

American politician (1923–2020)

Member of the Colorado Senate
- In office 1965–1973

Personal details
- Born: John Rutledge Bermingham; November 7, 1923 Lake Forest, Illinois, U.S.
- Died: May 29, 2020 (aged 96)
- Party: Republican
- Spouse: Marcia Dines (m. 1954; div. 1966)
- Children: 3
- Education: Yale University; Columbia Law School
- Profession: Politician, lawyer

Military service
- Allegiance: United States
- Branch/service: United States Navy
- Battles/wars: World War II

John Rutledge Bermingham (November 7, 1923 – May 29, 2020) was an American politician and lawyer who served in the Colorado Senate from 1965 to 1973 as a Republican.

== Early life and education ==
Bermingham was born in Lake Forest, Illinois on November 7, 1923. He served in the United States Navy during World War II.

Bermingham attended Yale University and Columbia Law School, graduating from the latter in 1949.

== Career ==
Bermingham served as a prosecutor for the United States District Court for the Southern District of New York. In 1953, he moved to Denver, Colorado, where he practiced oil and gas law.

Bermingham served in the Colorado Senate from 1965 to 1973 as a Republican. He sponsored legislation with future governor Richard Lamm that made Colorado the first state to liberalize its abortion laws. The legislation also promoted environmental legislation.

Bermingham resigned in 1973 to be Governor John D. Vanderhoof's Assistant for Environmental Affairs from 1973 to 1975, when he was appointed by Governor Lamm to chair the Colorado Land Use Commission.

== Political positions ==
Bermingham was pro-choice.

== Personal life and death ==
Bermingham married Marcia Dines in 1954. He had three children with her before they divorced in 1966.

Bermingham was founder and president of the Colorado Population Coalition. After serving in the Colorado Legislature, he was a board member of the Rocky Mountain Center of the Environment. While in his 80s, Bermingham taught courses at the University of Denver on population sustainability.

Bermingham wrote and privately published a book on global sustainability. He also wrote biographies pertaining to his grandparents and their families.

Bermingham died of natural causes at the age of 96 on May 29, 2020.

Colorado Senate
Preceded by —	Member of the Colorado Senate; 1965–1973	Succeeded by —
