= Behrend (surname) =

Behrend is a German surname. Notable people with the surname include:

- Arthur Henry Behrend (1853–1935), Polish-born song composer
- Felix Behrend (1911–1962), German and Australian mathematician
- Friedrich Jacob Behrend (1803–1889), German physician
- Genevieve Behrend (1881–1960), French-born author
- Gustav Behrend (1847–1925), German dermatologist
- Henry Behrend (1828–1893), British physician
- Hermann-Heinrich Behrend (1898–1987), German military officer during World War II
- Hilde Behrend (1917–2000), German-born English economist
- Jacob Friedrich Behrend (1833–1907), German jurist
- Jeanne Behrend (1911–1988), American pianist, musicologist, music educator, and composer
- Jelena Behrend (born 1968), Serbian-born jewelry designer
- Kai Behrend, German mathematician
- Katharina Behrend (1888–1973), German-born Dutch photographer
- Louise Behrend (1916–2011), American violinist and academic
- Marc Behrend (born 1961), American ice hockey goaltender
- Rita Behrend, German slalom canoer
- Robert Behrend (1856–1926), German chemist
- Siegfried Behrend (1933–1990), German guitarist
- Tomas Behrend (born 1974), German tennis player
- Issachar Berend Lehmann (1661–1730), Court Jew

== See also ==
- Behrend (disambiguation)
- Behrends
- Behrendt
- Berent (surname)
