= Culture of Birmingham =

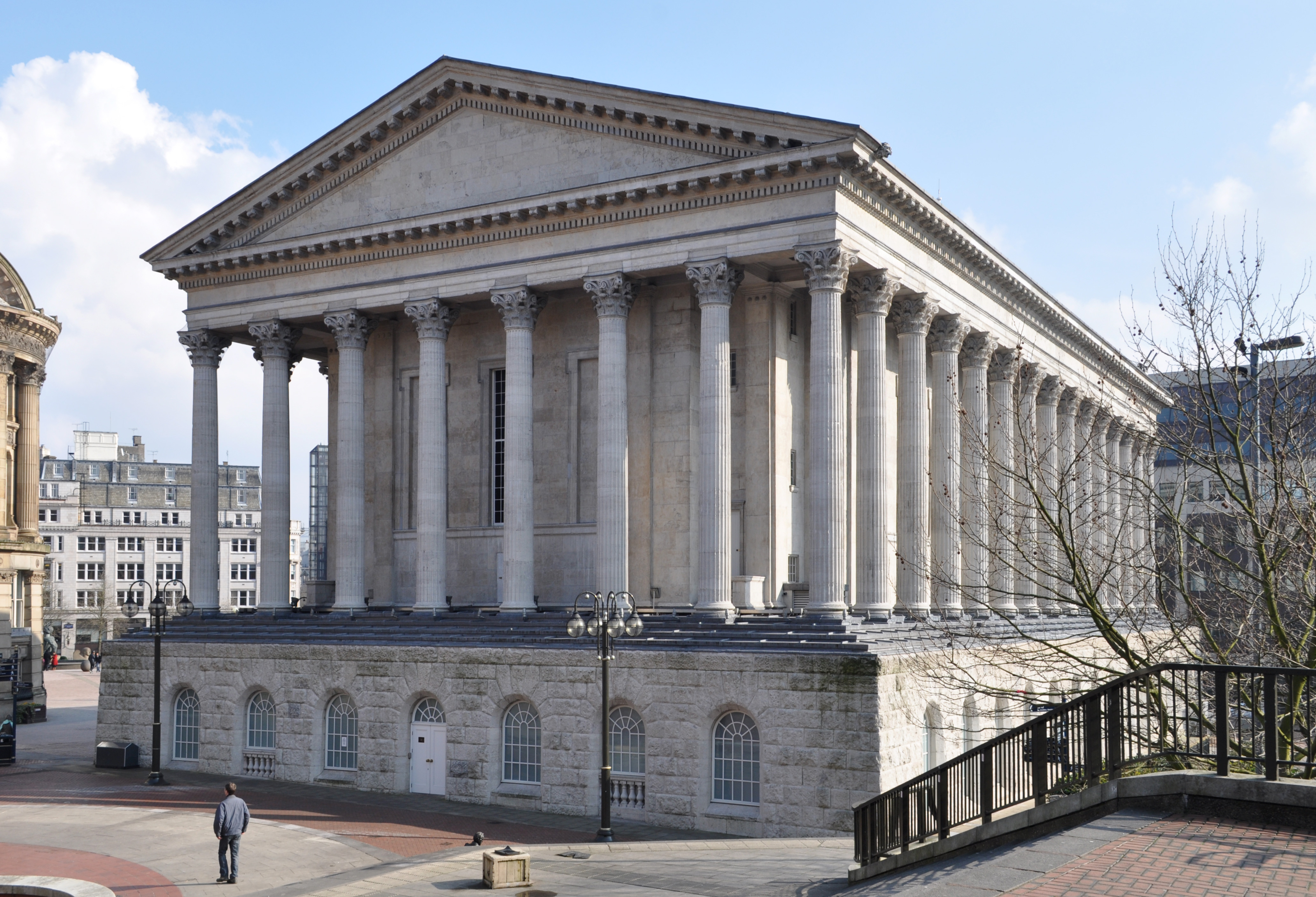
Birmingham Town Hall

The culture of Birmingham, England, is characterised by a deep-seated tradition of individualism and experimentation, and the unusually fragmented but innovative culture that results has been widely remarked upon by commentators. Writing in 1969, the New York-based urbanist Jane Jacobs cast Birmingham as one of the world's great examples of urban creativity: surveying its history from the 16th to the 20th centuries she described it as a "great, confused laboratory of ideas", noting how its chaotic structure as a "muddle of oddments" meant that it "grew through constant diversification". The historian G. M. Young – in a classic comparison later expanded upon by Asa Briggs – contrasted the "experimental, adventurous, diverse" culture of Birmingham with the "solid, uniform, pacific" culture of the outwardly similar city of Manchester. The American economist Edward Gleason wrote in 2011 that "cities, the dense agglomerations that dot the globe, have been engines of innovation since Plato and Socrates bickered in an Athenian marketplace. The streets of Florence gave us the Renaissance and the streets of Birmingham gave us the Industrial Revolution", concluding: "wandering these cities ... is to study nothing less than human progress."

The roots of this distinctive cultural trait lie in Birmingham's unique social and economic history. By the early 1600s the area had already developed a reputation as one where the traditional power of the aristocracy and the established church was weak, becoming a haven for incomers who did not fit in with established thinking elsewhere: religious non-conformists, scientific and literary free-thinkers, industrial entrepreneurs and political dissenters. The Midlands Enlightenment that followed in the 18th century saw the town's growth into an important centre of literary, musical, theatrical and artistic activity, and the emergence of an unusually tolerant, secular society, characterised by "unfussy conviviality ... lack of dogmatism ... and a sponge-like ability to absorb new ideas". This openness and cultural pluralism was further encouraged by the town's broad-based and entrepreneurial economic structure. The "city of a thousand trades" was made up of a wide variety of highly skilled specialists operating in small workshops, producing a constantly diversifying range of products in response to changing market conditions and collaborating in a shifting, fragmented web of overlapping and informal groupings. The result was the development of a culture that valued variety, adaptability and change more than uniformity and continuity; whose need for cooperation and trust bred an innate suspicion of boastfulness and pretension; and which was characterised by the remarkable capacity for "accommodating difference" that has been an enduring theme of the city's history. The historian William Hutton, noting the diversity of Birmingham's culture as early as 1782, remarked that "the wonder consists in finding such agreement in such variety". Over two centuries later in 2008 the philosopher Sadie Plant could still describe "the city's unique, almost declassé mixture of individualism and co-operation".

This inherently non-conformist culture has tended to set Birmingham apart from the London-dominated English cultural mainstream. The Independent wrote in 2012 of Birmingham's "intangible sense of the other, of being different despite being the bullseye of Britain". The poet Roy Fisher called it an "off-shore island in the middle of England". Writing in 1945, while the poet W. H. Auden was arguably the dominant figure of English literature worldwide, the American critic Edmund Wilson could still note how his "Birmingham background" meant that "in fundamental ways ... he doesn't belong in that London literary world – he's more vigorous and more advanced". However the same characteristic that sets Birmingham apart can also make it difficult to characterise and understand from outside. Disjunction and incongruity lie at the heart of the city's identity, and Birmingham often lacks the superficial unifying aesthetic of more homogeneous cities. Writers, artists or musicians cooperating in socially close-knit groups but producing work with little stylistic unity have been a characteristic of Birmingham's culture from the Lunar Society of the 1750s, through the Birmingham Group of the 1890s and the Highfield writers of the 1930s to the B-Town music scene of 2013. The city's "tradition of the untraditional", of moving forward through "waves of creative destruction", has also led to what the novelist Catherine O'Flynn has called the city's "complicated relationship with its past, where it's always trying to burn photos of itself". The result is that Birmingham has never been an easy city to define, its lack of a clear, simple image, coupled with its own characteristically ironic and self-deprecating sense of humour, often leading to its being stereotyped as "a non-place surrounded by motorways".

== Music ==
=== Classical music ===
The Birmingham Triennial Music Festival took place from 1784 to 1912 and was considered the grandest of its kind throughout Britain. Music was written for the festival by Mendelssohn, Gounod, Sullivan, Dvořák, Bantock and most notably Elgar, who wrote four of his most well known choral pieces for Birmingham.

Albert William Ketèlbey was born in Alma Street, Aston on 9 August 1875, the son of a teacher at the Vittoria School of Art. Ketèlbey attended the Trinity College of Music, where he beat the runner-up, Gustav Holst, for a musical scholarship.

John Joubert, the distinguished composer of choral works, joined the University of Birmingham's Music Department as senior lecturer in 1962, retiring in 1986 to concentrate on his music. During that time he had written the second of his operas and was working on his third, as well as completing a number of orchestral and chamber works. In 1995 the orchestra of Birmingham Composers Forum put on what was only the second UK performance of his Second Symphony, dating from 1970.

The internationally renowned City of Birmingham Symphony Orchestra's home venue is Symphony Hall, which also hosts concerts by many visiting orchestras.

Other professional orchestras based in the city include the Birmingham Contemporary Music Group, a chamber orchestra specialising in modern music with some world premieres; the Royal Ballet Sinfonia, who give concert performances under music director Barry Wordsworth in addition to playing for the Birmingham Royal Ballet; and Ex Cathedra, one of the country's oldest and most respected early-music and Baroque period instrument ensembles.

Birmingham is an important centre for musical education as the home of the Royal Birmingham Conservatoire, founded in 1859. The Royal College of Organists is based in Digbeth. Birmingham City Council appoint the Birmingham City Organist to provide a free series of weekly public organ recitals.

The Birmingham Royal Ballet resides in the city as does the Elmhurst School for Dance, based in Edgbaston, and which claims to be the world's oldest vocational dance school.

Birmingham's professional opera company – the Birmingham Opera Company – specialises in staging innovative performances in unusual venues (in 2005 it performed Monteverdi's Il Ritorno d'Ulisse in Patria in a burnt-out ice rink in the Chinese Quarter). Its artistic director, Graham Vick, has also directed at La Scala, Milan, the Metropolitan Opera in New York and the Royal Opera House in London.

Visiting opera companies such as Opera North and Welsh National Opera perform regularly at the Hippodrome.

Birmingham's other principal classical music venues include Birmingham Town Hall, CBSO Centre, the Bradshaw Hall at the Royal Birmingham Conservatoire, the Barber Concert Hall at the Barber Institute of Fine Arts and the Utilita Arena. Concerts also regularly take place in churches around the city including St Phillips Cathedral, St Paul's in the Jewellery Quarter, St Alban's in Highgate and The Oratory on the Hagley Road.

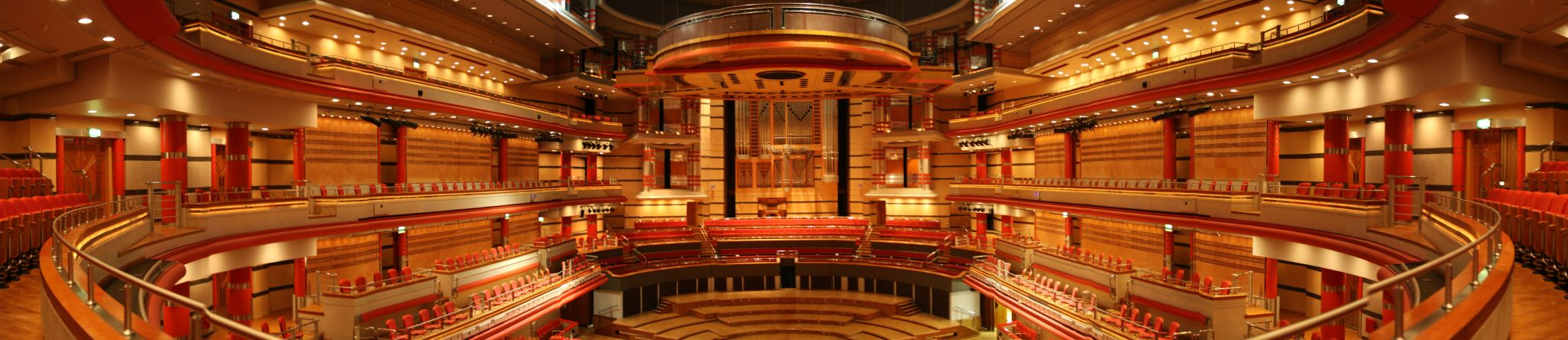
Symphony Hall

=== Jazz ===
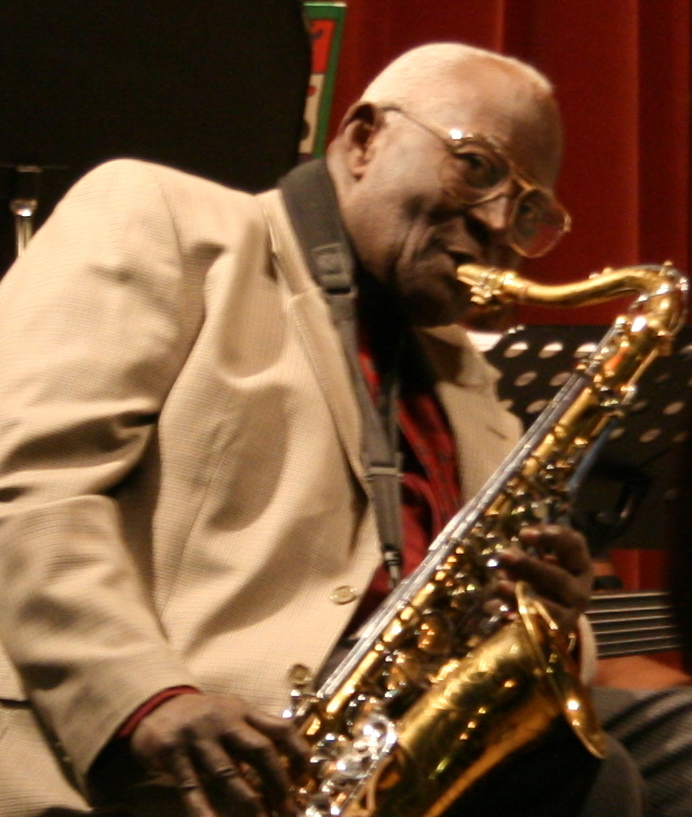
Andy Hamilton

Jazz has been popular in the city since the 1920s. The Harmonic Festival, the Mostly Jazz Festival and the annual International Jazz Festival run alongside the year-round contemporary programme presented by promoters and development agency Jazzlines, which is now integrated into Performances Birmingham Limited that runs Birmingham Town Hall and Symphony Hall, directed by Tony Dudley-Evans and Mary Wakelam Sloan. The musician-led Blam! also present regular jazz sessions in several venues around the city. Jazz musicians associated with the city include Andy Hamilton, Soweto Kinch, Julian Arguelles, Ronnie Ball, Tony Kinsey, Douglas "Dougle" Robinson and King Pleasure and the Biscuit Boys.

The busiest promoter of contemporary jazz in the city is the organisation Jazzlines (based in and a department of Symphony Hall), which mounts dozens of concerts every year featuring local, national and international artists in venues such as the CBSO Centre, the mac arts centre, the Glee Club and Symphony Hall. It enjoys the support of the city council and the Arts Council of England and also commissions new works from both local performers and performers of international standing.

=== Popular music ===
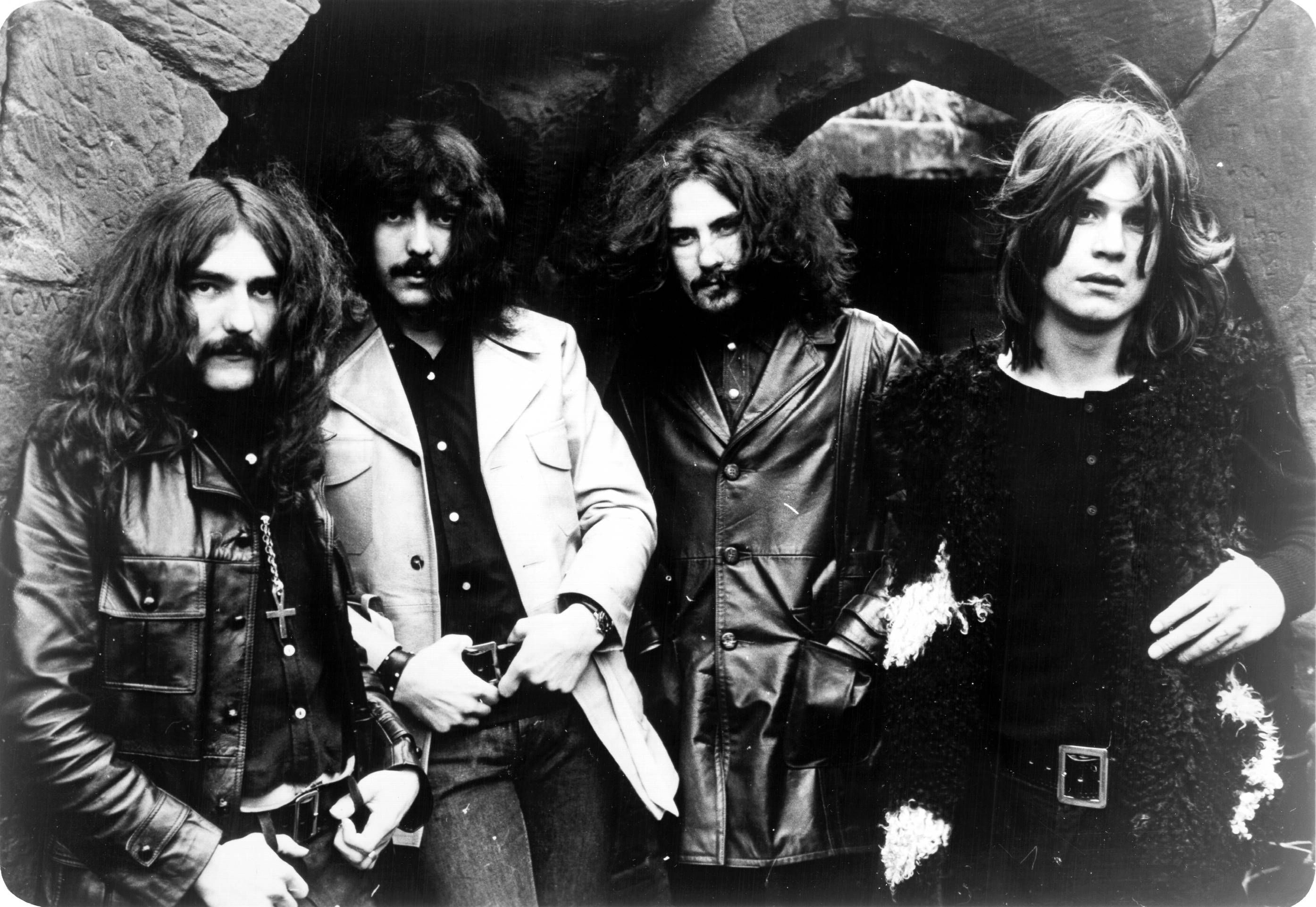
Black Sabbath, pioneers of heavy metal

During the 1960s Birmingham was the home of a music scene comparable to that of Liverpool. Although it produced no single band as big as The Beatles it was "a seething cauldron of musical activity", and the international success of groups such as The Move, The Spencer Davis Group, The Moody Blues, Traffic and the Electric Light Orchestra had a collective influence that stretched into the 1970s and beyond. The city was the birthplace of heavy metal music, with pioneering metal bands from the late 1960s and 1970s such as Black Sabbath, Judas Priest, and half of Led Zeppelin having come from Birmingham. The next decade saw the influential metal bands Napalm Death and Godflesh arise from the city. Birmingham was the birthplace of modern bhangra in the 1960s, and by the 1980s had established itself as the global centre of bhangra culture, which has grown into a global phenomenon embraced by members of the Indian diaspora worldwide from Los Angeles to Singapore. The 1970s also saw the rise of reggae and ska in the city with such bands as Steel Pulse, UB40, Musical Youth, Beshara and The Beat, expounding racial unity with politically leftist lyrics and multiracial line-ups, mirroring social currents in Birmingham at that time.

Other popular bands from Birmingham include Duran Duran, Fine Young Cannibals, Ocean Colour Scene, The Streets, The Twang and Dexys Midnight Runners. Musicians Jeff Lynne, Ozzy Osbourne, Tony Iommi, John Lodge, Roy Wood, Joan Armatrading, Toyah Willcox, Denny Laine, Sukshinder Shinda, Steve Winwood, Jamelia and Fyfe Dangerfield all grew up in the city.

Since 2012 the Digbeth-based B-Town indie music scene has attracted widespread attention, led by bands such as Peace and Swim Deep, with the NME comparing Digbeth to London's Shoreditch, and The Independent writing that "Birmingham is fast becoming the best place in the UK to look to for the most exciting new music".

O_{2} Academy on Bristol Street opened in September 2009, replacing the previous Academy venue in Dale End, which is now known as Forum Birmingham. Birmingham's other city-centre music venues include the National Indoor Arena, which was opened in 1991, the CBSO Centre, opened in 1997, O2 Institute in Digbeth and the Adrian Boult Hall at the Birmingham Conservatoire.

== Literature ==
The literary tradition of Birmingham originally grew out of the culture of religious puritanism that developed in the town in the 16th and 17th centuries. Birmingham's location away from established centres of power, its dynamic merchant-based economy and its weak aristocracy gave it a reputation as a place where loyalty to the established power structures of church and feudal state were weak, and saw it emerge as a haven for free-thinkers and radicals, encouraging the birth of a vibrant culture of writing, printing and publishing.

The 18th century saw the town's radicalism widen to encompass other literary areas, and while Birmingham's tradition of vigorous literary debate on theological issues was to survive into the Victorian era, the writers of the Midlands Enlightenment brought new thinking to areas as diverse as poetry, philosophy, history, fiction and children's literature. By the Victorian era Birmingham was one of the largest towns in England and at the forefront of the emergence of modern industrial society, a fact reflected in its role as both a subject and a source for the newly dominant literary form of the novel. The diversification of the city's literary output continued into the 20th century, encompassing writing as varied as the uncompromising modernist fiction of Henry Green, the science fiction of John Wyndham, the popular romance of Barbara Cartland, the children's stories of the Rev W. Awdry, the theatre criticism of Kenneth Tynan and the travel writing of Bruce Chatwin.

Writers with roots in Birmingham have had an international influence. John Rogers compiled the first complete authorised edition of The Bible to appear in the English language; J. R. R. Tolkien is the dominant figure in the genre of fantasy fiction and one of the bestselling authors in the history of the world; W. H. Auden's work has been called the greatest body of poetry written in the English language over the last century; while notable contemporary writers from the city include David Lodge, Jim Crace, Roy Fisher and Benjamin Zephaniah.

The city also has a tradition of distinctive literary subcultures, from the Puritan writers who established the first Birmingham Library in the 1640s; through the 18th century philosophers, scientists and poets of the Lunar Society and the Shenstone Circle; the Victorian Catholic revival writers associated with Oscott College and the Birmingham Oratory; to the politically engaged 1930s writers of Highfield and the Birmingham Group. This tradition continues today, with notable groups of writers associated with the University of Birmingham, the Tindal Street Press, and the city's burgeoning crime fiction, science fiction and poetry scenes.

== Theatre ==
=== Stage names ===
Kenneth Tynan and David Edgar were members of Birmingham's theatrical scene. The Birmingham School of Acting trains actors in the city.

=== Theatres ===
There are many theatres in Birmingham. The four largest professional theatres are the Alexandra Theatre ("the Alex"), Birmingham Repertory Theatre ("The Rep"), the Birmingham Hippodrome and the Old Rep. The mac and the Legacy Centre of Excellence arts centres, the Crescent Theatre and the Old Joint Stock Theatre also host many professional plays. Sutton Coldfield Town Hall has theatre facilities and hosts numerous amateur productions. The actors in the long-running Radio 4 serial The Archers live in and around Birmingham, where the supposedly rural programme is recorded.

Birmingham also hosts a number of independent and community theatre companies, including Banner Theatre which was founded in the city over thirty years ago. For ten years, Birmingham's Fierce! festival has presented a performance art festival. It has recently begun commissioning new works from British and international performers.

== Comedy ==
Comedians from Birmingham include Sid Field, Tony Hancock, Jasper Carrott, Shazia Mirza and Joe Lycett. Other leading figures include Jo Enright (Lab Rats, Phoenix Nights, Time Trumpet), Natalie Haynes, James Cook, Weakest Link winner Andy White and Barbara Nice (the creation of actress Janice Connolly). The Glee Club is the city's main comedy venue. The mac also host monthly/regular comedy sessions while smaller independent comedy promoters/ venues include The Cheeky Monkey Comedy Club, The Laughing Sole (in Strichley) and MY Comedy (Kitchen Garden Cafe, Kings Heath) with other nights at Old Joint Stock Theatre (city centre), and Alexandra Theatre.

The Birmingham Comedy Festival was founded in 2001 and runs over 10 days at the beginning of October with a line-up that combines leading TV names with rising talent from Birmingham and the West Midlands. Among the leading acts who've appeared at the festival are Frankie Boyle, Jimmy Carr, Lee Evans, Ken Dodd, Peter Kay, Michael McIntyre, Lenny Henry, Matt Lucas and Dylan Moran. The festival also runs the Breaking Talent Award, a comedy award for new and early career acts from across the wider West Midlands (established 2014). 2012's festival was headlined by John Bishop and included over 60 events around the city. The independent festival is open to not only stand-up comedy, but any art form, including theatre, music, visual arts, film, dance and spoken word, and in 2017 won What's On Readers' Awards for Best Midlands Arts Festival.

== Visual arts ==
=== Fine art ===
David Cox was a Birmingham watercolour artist and president of the Associated Artists in Water Colour in 1810.

An "Academy of Arts" was organised in 1814, and an exhibition of paintings took place in Union Passage that year. A School of Design, or "Society of Arts", was started February 7, 1821; Sir Robert Lawley, Bt (the first Lord Wenlock) presenting a valuable collection of casts from Grecian sculpture. The first exhibition was held in 1826, in a building on New Street.

The first Ballot for pictures to be chosen from the Annual Exhibition of Local Artists took place in 1835.

Edward Burne-Jones was born in Birmingham, spent his first twenty years in the city, and later became the president of the (later Royal) Birmingham Society of Artists (which dates from 1826). He strongly influenced the Birmingham Group, which formed the link between late Romanticism in the visual arts and the Birmingham Surrealists who were prominent in the city's arts in the early and mid-20th century.

The Scottish painter William Gear (1915–97) had studied with Fernand Léger in Paris and after World War 2 became the only British member of the Surrealist-influenced COBRA, the most avant-garde movement of the time. Between 1964 and 1975 he was head of the Faculty of Fine Art at Birmingham College of Art and continued to live in the city until his death.

The Birmingham Arts Lab at Gosta Green was an important centre for alternative comic art in the late 1970s; in the 1990s the Birmingham Museum and Art Gallery staged a historical retrospective of the work made there.

=== Photography ===
Victorian photographer Sir Benjamin Stone (1838–1914) lived and worked in Erdington, Birmingham. The Birmingham Central Library now holds the Benjamin Stone Collection. The Victorian "father of art photography", Oscar Gustave Rejlander lived and worked at nearby Wolverhampton, and was a founder member of the Birmingham Photographic Society. The BPS later elected Henry Peach Robinson as a member.

The photographer Bill Brandt made an extensive series of photographs for the Bournville Village Trust in Birmingham, between 1939 and 1943. These have been published as the book Homes Fit For Heroes (Dewi Lewis, 2004). The post-war changes in the cityscape, especially the clearance of older housing and the changes to the central markets, were documented by Phyllis Nicklin (1913?-1969).

In late 1979, Derek Bishton (now Consultant Editor for The Daily Telegraph), John Reardon (became Picture Editor of The Observer), and Brian Homer were three community photographers and activists in Handsworth, and they facilitated the 'Handsworth Self Portrait' series of self-portraits on the streets of Handsworth, Birmingham. Other notable photographers include Pogus Caesar, his OOM Gallery Archive holds in excess of 14,000 photographic images from 1982–present. Caesar's recent exhibitions include From Jamaica Row – Rebirth of the Bullring, Muzik Kinda Sweet and That Beautiful Thing, his work is represented in Birmingham Central Library. Vanley Burke also created a major portfolio of British West Indian and African themed portrait and community photography from the 1970s to the 21st century.

The city is home to famed fashion photographer Garazi Gardner.

=== Design and typography ===
John Baskerville (1706–1775) was a noted type designer, the developer of wove paper, and typographic businessman in fine printing. His Baskerville font is still in wide use today. The Birmingham Guild and School of Handicrafts operated a fine arts small-press, the Press of the Birmingham Guild of Handicraft. From 1895 until 1919 this Press produced books in the Kelmscott Press tradition of the Arts and Crafts Movement. George Kynoch's Kynoch Press (1876–1981) was a Birmingham printing house that substantially contributed to the development of a British typography. The teacher Leonard Jay (1888–1963) made the Birmingham School of Printing a profound influence on a generation of typographers, and set the pattern for printing education worldwide. More recent small-press printers included F. E. Pardoe and David Wishart.

Robert Dudley Best (1892–1984), managing director of the lighting factory, Best & Lloyd, designed the "Bestlite" adjustable table lamp, which was first produced in 1930 and continues to be manufactured. Best was a member of the Design and Industries Association and was influenced by Walter Gropius.

=== Contemporary artists ===
Graffiti (or "spraycan art") culture appeared in the early 1980s, with the area featuring in Channel 4 documentary Bombing. Local artists who use urban Birmingham as their canvas (this is illegal, and regarded by some as vandalism) have included Chu and Goldie. Street art competitions are still regularly held at the Custard Factory.

A variety of contemporary public art is located around the city centre, most of it created by artists from outside the Midlands. The construction of the Bull Ring Shopping Centre included three light wands which were erected at the main entrance, a huge mural on a glass façade located at the entrance facing New Street station and three fountains in St Martin's Square in the shape of cubes, which are illuminated at night in different colours.

Contemporary African-Caribbean artists and photographers who have exhibited internationally include Pogus Caesar, Keith Piper and the late Donald Rodney.

=== Galleries ===
- The Barber Institute of Fine Arts is housed at the University of Birmingham and although only a small gallery it was declared 'Gallery of the Year' by the Good Britain Guide 2004.
- Birmingham has one of the largest collections of Pre-Raphaelite art in the world at The Birmingham Museum & Art Gallery.
- The Ikon Gallery is housed in a neo-Gothic former school in Brindleyplace and showcases modern art. Number 9 The Gallery is close by.
- The Halcyon Gallery is located inside the International Convention Centre. It opened with a major retrospective of Robert Lenkiewicz, and has continued with exhibitions by artists as diverse as Rolf Harris and L. S. Lowry.
- The Waterhall gallery in the Birmingham Museum & Art Gallery displays a regular showcase of modern art which includes local artists and others sometimes from the city's own extensive collection.
- Harborne Gallery, the Royal Birmingham Society of Artists and the 'New Gallery' in St Paul's square also shows local artists.
- The old Bird's Custard Factory is now one of the largest media and arts villages in Europe, with occasional exhibitions and modern sculpture and water features.
- OOM Gallery online collaborates with the private, public and voluntary sector by developing and producing a diverse range of multimedia art projects.
- The mac hosts theatre performances, concerts, literature and poetry showcases, courses, film screenings and small art exhibitions.
- The Drum Arts Centre features works of African, Asian and Caribbean contemporary artists.
- Selly Oak ball park is home to many graffiti murals that change on a regular basis. Other graffiti art can be seen across the city on disused buildings and canal towpaths as well as subways.

There are a variety of other small and private galleries in the city.

== Media ==
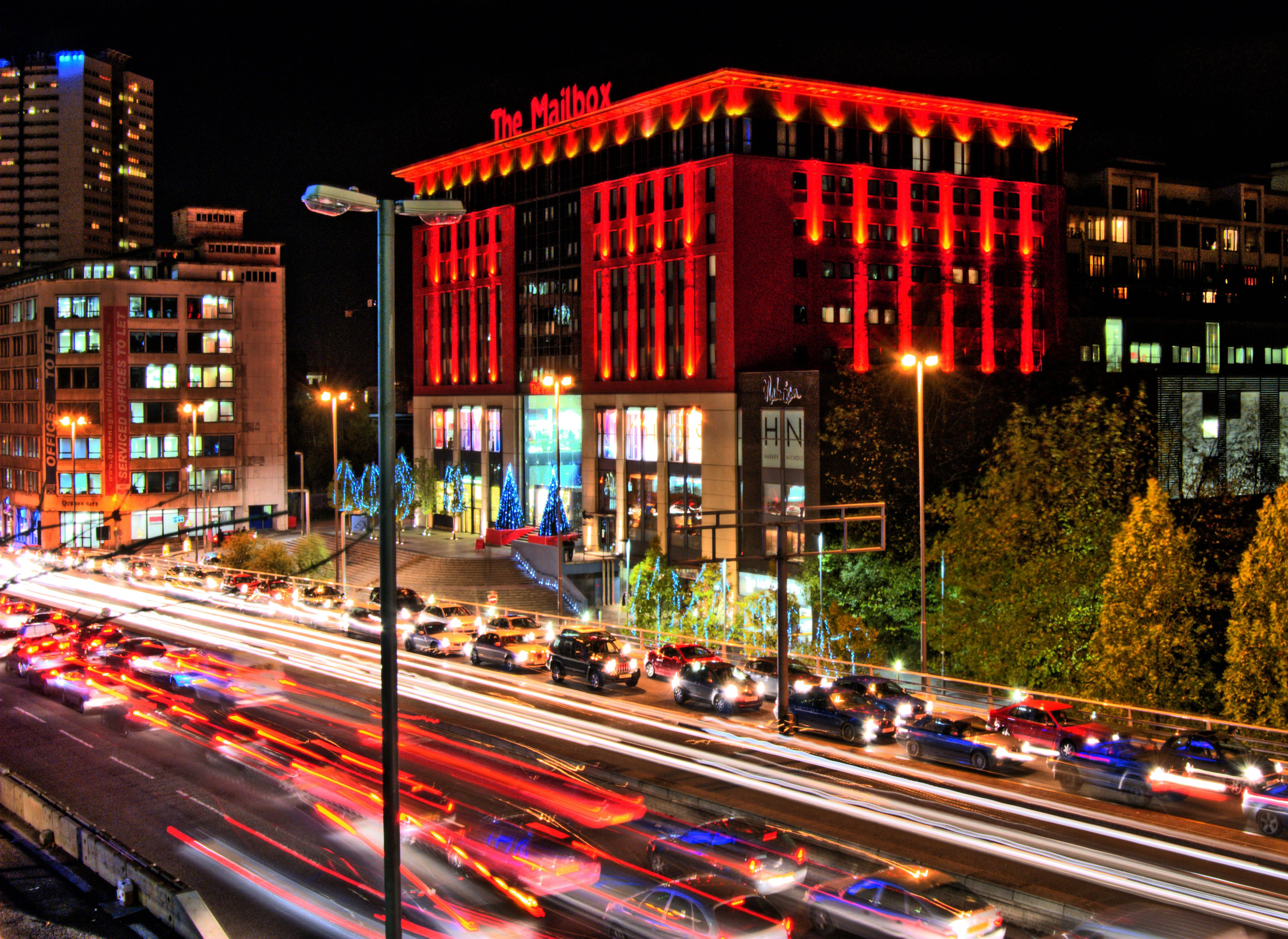
The Mailbox, headquarters of BBC Birmingham, BBC West Midlands and BBC English Regions.

Birmingham has several major local newspapers – the daily Birmingham Mail and the weekly Birmingham Post and Sunday Mercury, all owned by the Trinity Mirror. Forward (formerly Birmingham Voice) is a freesheet produced by Birmingham City Council, which is distributed to homes in the city. Birmingham is also the hub for various national ethnic media, and the base for two regional Metro editions (East and West Midlands).

The BBC has two facilities in the city. The Mailbox, in the city centre, is the national headquarters of BBC English Regions and the headquarters of BBC West Midlands and the BBC Birmingham network production centre. These were previously located at the Pebble Mill Studios in Edgbaston. The BBC Drama Village, based in Selly Oak, is a production facility specialising in television drama.

Central/ATV studios in Birmingham were the location for the recording of many programmes for ITV including Tiswas and Crossroads, until the complex was closed in 1997, and Central moved to its current Gas Street studios. These were also the main hub for CITV, until that was moved to Manchester in 2004. Central's output from Birmingham now consists of only the West and East editions of the regional news programme Central Tonight.

The city is served by numerous national and regional radio stations, as well as local radio stations. These include Hits Radio Birmingham, Capital Midlands, Heart West Midlands, Greatest Hits West Midlands, BBC Radio WM, New Style Radio 98.7FM and Smooth Radio's West Midlands News & Admin Team. The Archers, the world's longest running radio soap, is recorded in Birmingham for BBC Radio 4.

== Cinema ==
Birmingham has not been especially prominent in British cinema, however there are a number of films that have been filmed partly or wholly in the city:

- Millions Like Us (1943)
- Privilege (1967)
- A Private Enterprise (1974)
- Take Me High (1974)
- The Firm (1989)
- I Bought a Vampire Motorcycle (1990)
- Bhaji on the Beach (1993)
- Felicia's Journey (1999)
- Sex Lives of the Potato Men (2004)
- Don't Stop Dreaming (2007)
- Clubbed (2008)
- 1 Day (2009)
- Tormented (2009)
- Land Gold Women (2011)
- Turbulence (2011)
- Tezz (2012)
- The Girl With All The Gifts (2016)
- Kingsman: The Golden Circle (2017)
- Mission Impossible: 7 (2023)

== Major arts events ==
From 1997 to 2012 the city hosted an annual arts festival ArtsFest during September, where families could enjoy many of the city's arts, for free. It was said to be the largest free arts festival in the UK. In December 2006 the city council announced that it would no longer hold Artsfest. , but it continued in 2008 under the support of Brindley Place, Centro, Kerrang Radio, and Birmingham City Council.

== Heritage ==
The Burning Bush of Birmingham R.B.P. #1043 is a Protestant Christian fraternal organization within the Royal Black Preceptory. They are closely associated with the Orange Order. It is the only Royal Black Institution in England. The organization's ceremonies are focused on a deeper study of the Bible and key biblical figures.

== See also ==
- Architecture of Birmingham
