= Simone Barck =

German contemporary historian and literary scholar

- Born: 1944; Stolp, Gau Pomerania, Greater German Reich
- Died: July 16, 2007 (aged 62–63)
- Occupation: Academic
- Partner: Karlheinz Barck

Academic background
- Education: University of Rostock
- Alma mater: University of Greifswald
- Thesis: Johannes R. Bechers Publizistik in der Sowjetunion 1933-1945

Academic work
- Discipline: German studies
- Institutions: Centre for Contemporary History

Simone Barck (July 1944 – 16 July 2007) was a German contemporary historian and literary scholar. A principal focus of her research was on Literature and the Publishing Sector in the German Democratic Republic (GDR).

== Life ==
Barck was born in Nazi Germany towards the end of July 1944 during the final year of the Second World War. Following the expulsions that defined the mid-1940s in the region, she ended up in what became, from 1949, the GDR. She attended school in Rostock before moving on to study Germanistics and Slavic studies at the University of Rostock and the University of Greifswald. After this she moved to Berlin and became a Cultural Official (Kulturreferentin) at Humboldt University.

In 1970 she joined the newly created Central Institute for Literary History (Zentralinstitut für Literaturgeschichte (ZIL)) in order to work in its German studies department. Her qualifications in Germanistics were fairly mainstream in the East German academic world, but the depth of her knowledge of Slavic studies was unusual. At around this time she brought both expertise sets to her doctoral dissertation entitled "Johannes R. Bechers Publizistik in der Sowjetunion 1933-1945" ("Johannes R. Becher's journalism in the Soviet Union 1933-1945"), which provided new insights on literary aspects of the Brecht-Lukács debates on at the time.

Barck stayed with the ZIL for more than two decades. Her Habilitation qualification followed in 1986 and was published in 1987. It covered the same period and was a study of the anti-fascist German writers exiled in the Soviet Union during the Nazi years.

After the Peaceful Revolution Barck worked at the Centre for Contemporary History (Zentrum für Zeithistorische Forschung), as it became known after 1996, in Potsdam.

Simone Barck died unexpectedly on 16 July 2007, following a short illness.
