= Robert Best =

Robert Best may refer to:

- Robert Henry Best (1896–1952), American foreign correspondent convicted of treason in 1948
- Robert Best (politician) (1856–1946), Australian federal and Victorian state politician
- Robert Dudley Best (1892–1984), Birmingham-based British industrial designer
- Robert Best, doll designer for Mattel who appeared on American television series Project Runway season 3
