= ZZF =

ZZF may refer to:

- Centre for Contemporary History (Leibniz-Zentrum für Zeithistorische Forschung), an interdisciplinary research institute focusing on the contemporary history of Europe
- ZZF, the telegraph code for Zhengzhou railway station, Henan, China
