= Jan C. Behrends =

German historian (born 1969)

Jan Claas Behrends
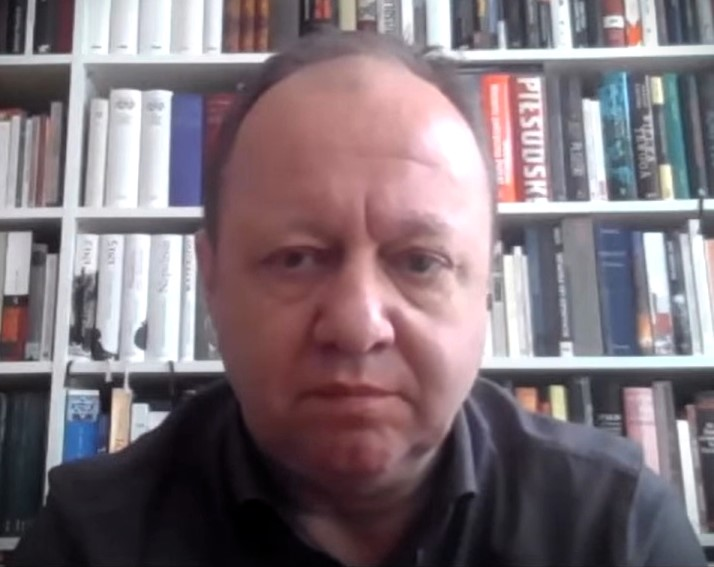
- Behrends in 2024
- Scientific career
- Fields: History (Soviet, post-Soviet and Russian studies)
- Institutions: WZB Berlin Social Science Center; Centre for Contemporary History
- Thesis: Die erfundene Freundschaft: Propaganda für die Sowjetunion in Polen und in der DDR (2004)

Jan Claas Behrends (born 5 December 1969) is a German historian, who is known for his research on Stalinism, propaganda, public discourse, violence and wars in the Soviet and post-Soviet space. He is regarded as a leading expert on the history of Soviet and Russian security services. He is a senior researcher at the Centre for Contemporary History, and formerly worked at the WZB Berlin Social Science Center.

== Career ==
Behrends studied history, philosophy and literature at the Free University of Berlin, the Humboldt University of Berlin, the University of Wisconsin and Moscow State University. He earned his PhD in history in 2004 at the University of Potsdam with the dissertation Die erfundene Freundschaft: Propaganda für die Sowjetunion in Polen und in der DDR on pro-Soviet propaganda in the Polish People's Republic and East Germany.

He worked at the WZB Berlin Social Science Center from 2005 to 2011, when he joined the Centre for Contemporary History where he headed the project "Violence and State Legitimacy in Late Socialism" until 2015. Since 2019 he heads the research project "Legacies of Communism", that studies authoritarian developments in Central and Eastern European states and post-Soviet societies after the Fall of Communism. He was a Feodor Lynen Fellow at the University of Chicago in 2007, sponsored by the Alexander von Humboldt Foundation. He teaches Eastern European history at the Free University of Berlin and the Humboldt University of Berlin. He has written extensively on the Russo-Ukrainian War and the political developments in Russia under Vladimir Putin. Die Welt described him as one of the most renowned experts on the Soviet secret police, the Cheka, and its successors until the present day, including today's FSB.

In March 2022 Behrends was appointed professor of history at the European University Viadrina in Frankfurt (Oder).

Behrends is a member of the Deutsche Gesellschaft für Osteuropakunde and the Association for Slavic, East European and Eurasian Studies (ASEEES). He was also involved in the establishment of Historians without Borders where he is a member of the coordinating committee. He has participated in the Körber Foundation History Forum.

== Bibliography ==
- with Gábor T. Rittersporn and Malte Rolf: Sphären von Öffentlichkeit in Gesellschaften sowjetischen Typs. Zwischen partei-staatlicher Selbstinszenierung und kirchlichen Gegenwelten (= Komparatistische Bibliothek. Vol. 11). Peter Lang, Frankfurt am Main 2003.
- with Thomas Lindenberger and Patrice G. Poutrus: Fremde und Fremd-Sein in der DDR. Zu historischen Ursachen der Fremdenfeindlichkeit in Ostdeutschland. Metropol, Berlin 2003.
- with Arfon Rees, Bálazs Apor and Polly Jones: The Leader Cult in Communist Dictatorships. Stalin and the Eastern Bloc. Palgrave, Basingstoke/New York 2004.
- with Árpád von Klimó and Patrice G. Poutrus: Antiamerikanismus im 20. Jahrhundert. Studien zu West- und Osteuropa (= Studien zur Politik- und Gesellschaftsgeschichte. Vol. 68). Dietz, Bonn 2005.
- Die erfundene Freundschaft: Propaganda für die Sowjetunion in Polen und in der DDR (= Zeithistorische Studien. Vol. 32). Böhlau, Cologne/Weimar/Wien 2006, ISBN 3-412-23005-7.
- Moskau und Chicago als Metropolen der Moderne: Sozialer Konflikt und gesellschaftliche Integration 1870–1914. WZB, Berlin 2007.
- with Martin Kohlrausch: Races to Modernity. Metropolitan Aspirations in Eastern Europe, 1890–1940. Central European University Press, Budapest/New York 2014.
- with Thomas Lindenberger: Underground Publishing and the Public Sphere. Transnational Perspectives (= Wiener Studien zur Zeitgeschichte. Vol. 6). Lit Verlag, Wien 2014.
- with Vera Dubina and Andrej Sorokin: Povsednevnaja žizn' pri socializme. Nemeckie i rossiiskie podchody (Alltagsleben im Sozialismus. Deutsche und russische Annäherungen.) ROSSPEN, Moscow 2015.
- Nationalities Papers 43, 5 (2015) Special Issue: War, Violence, and the Military during Late Socialism and Transition
- with Thomas Lindenberger und Nikolaus Katzer: 100 Jahre Roter Oktober. Zur Weltgeschichte der Russischen Revolution. Chr. Links: Berlin 2017.
- The Return to War and Violence. Case Studies on the USSR, Russia and Yugoslavia, 1979–2014. Routledge: London, New York 2017.
- with Jürgen Danyel: Grenzgänger und Brückenbauer: Zeitgeschichte durch den Eisernen Vorhang. Wallstein: Göttingen 2019.
