= Highfield, Birmingham =

Demolished house in Birmingham, England

Coordinates: 52.4421°N 1.9217°W

Highfield in 1982, as featured in David Lodge's TV documentary As I Was Walking Down Bristol Street.

Highfield was a large house situated at 128 Selly Park Road in the Selly Park area of Birmingham, England. Built in the 1860s, it was bought in 1929 by Philip Sargant Florence and his wife Lella Secor Florence after Sargant Florence was appointed as a professor at the nearby University of Birmingham.

Under the Florence's ownership Highfield became a focal point for the cultural life of Birmingham in the 1930s, a period when the city was the focus of great intellectual ferment. Secor Florence let self-contained flats within the house out to other members of the university and held regular unplanned and informal parties for "huge numbers" of students, academics and other guests, that could involve anything from dancing, to picnics on the lawn, to skating on the frozen lake in the house's four acres of grounds. Highfield also formed a focus for political activity; in 1932 the dining room was converted into a studio where artists painted anti-war posters which were paraded through the city the following weekend, and in 1933 the house was the site of the rehearsals for the play DISARM!, performed at Birmingham Town Hall, whose cast was recruited from trade unions and factory dramatic societies.

Highfield became a particular focus for local writers, and formed the centre of a vibrant literary circle that included the poets W. H. Auden and Henry Reed, the Birmingham Group novelists Walter Allen and John Hampson, the art historian Nikolaus Pevsner and the radio dramatist R. D. Smith. The poet Louis MacNeice lived in the flat above the coach house at the rear of the main house throughout his entire time in Birmingham, and the literary critic William Empson lived at Highfield while seeking a post at the University of Birmingham after his expulsion from Cambridge.

The influence of Highfield also extended well beyond Birmingham. Walter Allen described how "Most English left-wing intellectuals and American intellectuals visiting Britain must have passed through Highfield between 1930 and 1950". Visitors from outside the city known to have stayed at Highfield included the philosopher G. E. Moore, the anthropologist Margaret Mead, the biologist Julian Huxley, the architect Walter Gropius, the politician Ernest Bevin, the American ambassador John Gilbert Winant, the poet Stephen Spender, the artist Robert Medley, the theatre director Rupert Doone, and the writers A. L. Rowse, Maurice Dobb, John Strachey and Naomi Mitchison.

During the 1930s Bauhaus founder Walter Gropius was commissioned by Sargant Florence to design a modernist block of flats for Jack Pritchard's Isokon on a plot at the rear of Highfield on Kensington Road, but the plan was thwarted by local opposition.

Highfield, and the literary culture that surrounded it, were the subject of a TV documentary by David Lodge in 1982. The house was demolished in 1984, and the site is now occupied by Southbourne Close.

== Bibliography ==
- Allen, Walter (1981), As I Walked Down New Grub Street: memories of a writing life, London: Heinemann, ISBN 0434018295
- Florence, Barbara Moench (1978), "Afterword", in Florence, Barbara Moench (ed.), Lella Secor: a diary in letters, 1915–1922, New York: B. Franklin, pp. 267–273, ISBN 0891020713
- Harries, Susie (2011), Nikolaus Pevsner: The Life, London: Chatto & Windus, ISBN 978-0701168391
