= Behrend =

Behrend may refer to:

== People ==
- Behrend (surname)

== Places ==
- Penn State Erie (Behrend), Pennsylvania
- Penn State Behrend
- Arboretum at Penn State Behrend

== Other ==
- Comcast Corp. v. Behrend, a United States Supreme Court case

== See also ==
- Behrends
- Behrendt
