= Lella Secor Florence =

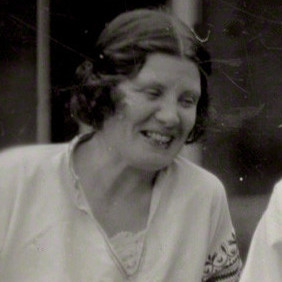
- Born: Lella Faye Secor; February 13 1887; Battle Creek, Michigan, US
- Died: January 14 1966

Lella Secor Florence (born Lella Faye Secor; February 13, 1887 – January 14, 1966) was an American writer, journalist, pacifist, feminist and pioneer of birth control.

== Early life ==
Lella Faye Secor was born in Battle Creek, Michigan. In 1892 her family moved to Ventura, California before moving to Green Bay, Wisconsin and finally, in 1898, returning to Battle Creek. Her father abandoned the family, and her mother ran a boarding house.

== Journalism career and peace activist ==
In 1906 she became a journalist in Battle Creek and then in a variety of towns in Washington state. She sailed on the Henry Ford Peace Ship in 1915 as a reporter. She co-founded two pacifist organisations that aimed to keep the United States out of World War One: the American Neutral Conference Committee and the Emergency Peace Federation.

== Personal life ==
In 1917 Secor married the economist Philip Sargant Florence. They had two children, both sons.

== Feminist activist ==
In 1921, Secor moved to Cambridge, England with her husband after he began working at University of Cambridge. She joined the Women's International League. In Cambridge she became actively involved in campaigning for birth control. She set up the first birth control clinic in Cambridge in 1925 and was one of the earliest women members of the Cambridge Labour Party. On one occasion, she attended a lecture given by a famous anti-feminist lecturer and was surprised to see women audience members segregated at the side of the hall. She sat in the middle of the hall to protest this.

Ivor Montagu wrote of Secor in his autobiography that she was "a freckled American redhead who had been a spirited battler against the violence with which the U.S. authorities assailed pacifist protest.'

For a period she lived away from her husband in a flat in Paris.

In 1929, Philip was appointed to the chair in commerce at the University of Birmingham and the couple moved to the Birmingham district of Selly Park, where they bought a large house called Highfield. In 1930 she published Birth Control on Trial. Their house Highfield became a focal point for the intellectual life of Birmingham in the 1930s – the poet Louis MacNeice lived in the converted coachman's quarters and the writer Walter Allen described how "Most English Left-Wing intellectuals and American intellectuals visiting Britain must have passed through Highfield between 1930 and 1950". Lella remained committed to disarmament, birth control and women's rights and continued to write and campaign. She died of pneumonia following a stroke in 1966.

== Bibliography ==
- Florence, Barbara Moench, ed. (1978), Lella Secor: a diary in letters, 1915–1922, New York: Burt Franklin & Co., ISBN 0891020713
