= Behrends =

Behrends is a German surname. It is a variant of Behrendt. Notable people with the surname include:

- Heinrich Behrends (1916–2002), German military officer during World War II;
- Hermann Behrends (1907–1948), German Nazi SS officer executed for war crimes;
- Jan C. Behrends (born 1969), German historian;
- Leffmann Behrends (1630–1714), German financial agent.

== See also ==
- Behrend (disambiguation)
