= Hilde Behrend =

British economist

Hilde Behrend (13 August 1917 – 11 January 2000) was an economist known for her research into industrial relations and the motivational differences between workers.

== Background and education ==
Hilde Behrend was born on 13 August 1917 in Berlin, Germany. Her father, Felix Wilhelm Behrend, was a physics and mathematics teacher and a well-known educationalist, who was demoted and dismissed by the Nazis due to his Jewish heritage. Her brother, Felix Behrend, became a mathematician.

In 1936, aged 19 years old, Behrend moved to London. She first worked as a secretary, but in 1941 she started at the London School of Economics to study economics. Here, she won the University of London's Metcalfe scholarship for women and graduated with honours in economics in 1944. After finishing her degree, she taught German and French at a grammar school, before starting work as a research assistant for Professor Sargant Florence at the University of Birmingham.

== Economic contributions ==
Behrend completed her PhD on 'Absence Under Full Employment' at Birmingham, before moving to the University of Edinburgh in 1954, to take up a research lectureship at the new social sciences research centre led by Professor John Macmurray. She remained at Edinburgh for the whole of her academic career.

Behrend's research focused primarily on labour and industrial relations, in particular the interrelationships between economics and psychology in understanding how people operate at work. She coined the phrase 'effort bargaining', in relation to her research into the ways in which workers relate their effort to the pay they receive, observing that workers will work at less than their highest capacity in order to match their level of effort to what they perceive to be a fair amount of work for their pay. She also came up with the 'blue Monday index' which measures the difference between Monday's and Friday's absence rates, and how these voluntary absence varied by types of worker.

== Bibliography ==
- Problems of labour and inflation, Croom Helm, 1984.
- Behrend, H. (1953). Absence and labour turnover in a changing economic climate. Occupational Psychology, 27(2), 69-79.
- Behrend, H. (1957). The effort bargain. ILR Review, 10(4), 503-515.
- Behrend, H. (1959). Voluntary absence from work. Int'l Lab. Rev., 79, 109
- Behrend, H. (1959). Financial incentives as the expression of a system of beliefs. The British Journal of Sociology, 10(2), 137-147.
- Behrend, H. (1963). The field of industrial relations. British journal of industrial relations, 1(2), 383-394.
- Behrend, H., & Pocock, S. (1976). Absence and the individual: a six-year study in one organisation. Int'l Lab. Rev., 114, 311.
- How to Monitor Absence from Work, Inst. of Personnel Mgmt., 1978
