= Philip Sargant Florence =

American economist

Philip Sargant Florence (25 June 1890 – 29 January 1982) was an American economist who spent most of his life in the United Kingdom. His most noted areas of research were in the area which might be known as regional economics and include the measurement of spatial industrial concentration; this includes the invention of both a location quotient and a coefficient of specialization.

== Life ==
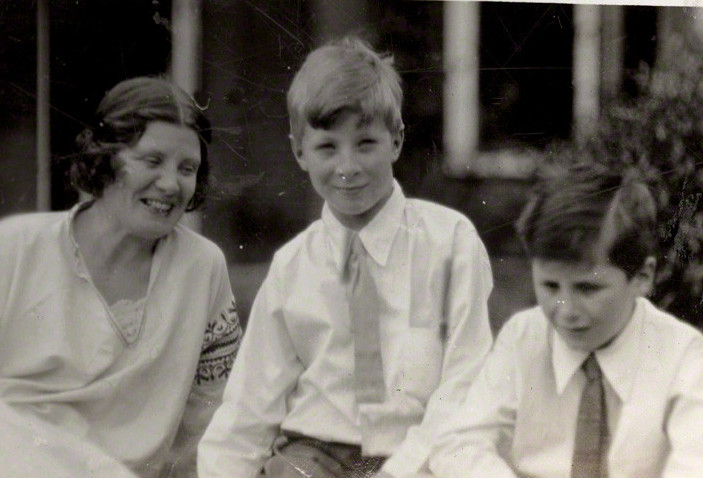
His wife Lella Secor Florence and their children

Born in Nutley, New Jersey in the United States, he was the son of Henry Smyth Florence, an American musician, and Mary Sargant Florence, a British painter. His sister was Alix Strachey. He was educated at Windlesham House School, Rugby School and Gonville and Caius College, Cambridge, before studying for his PhD at Columbia University in New York City. In 1917 he married the writer and birth control advocate Lella Faye Secor., the couple had two sons.

In 1921 he was appointed as a lecturer in economics at the University of Cambridge, and in 1929 he was made Professor of Commerce at the University of Birmingham, where he remained until his retirement in 1955. He was a friend of Robert Dudley Best, and a mentor of Hilde Behrend.

He was awarded an honorary CBE in 1952.

== Selected publications ==
- Florence, P. Sargent (assisted by Baldamus, W.). 1948. Investment, Location, and Size of Plant. Cambridge: Cambridge University Press.
