= Henry Behrend =

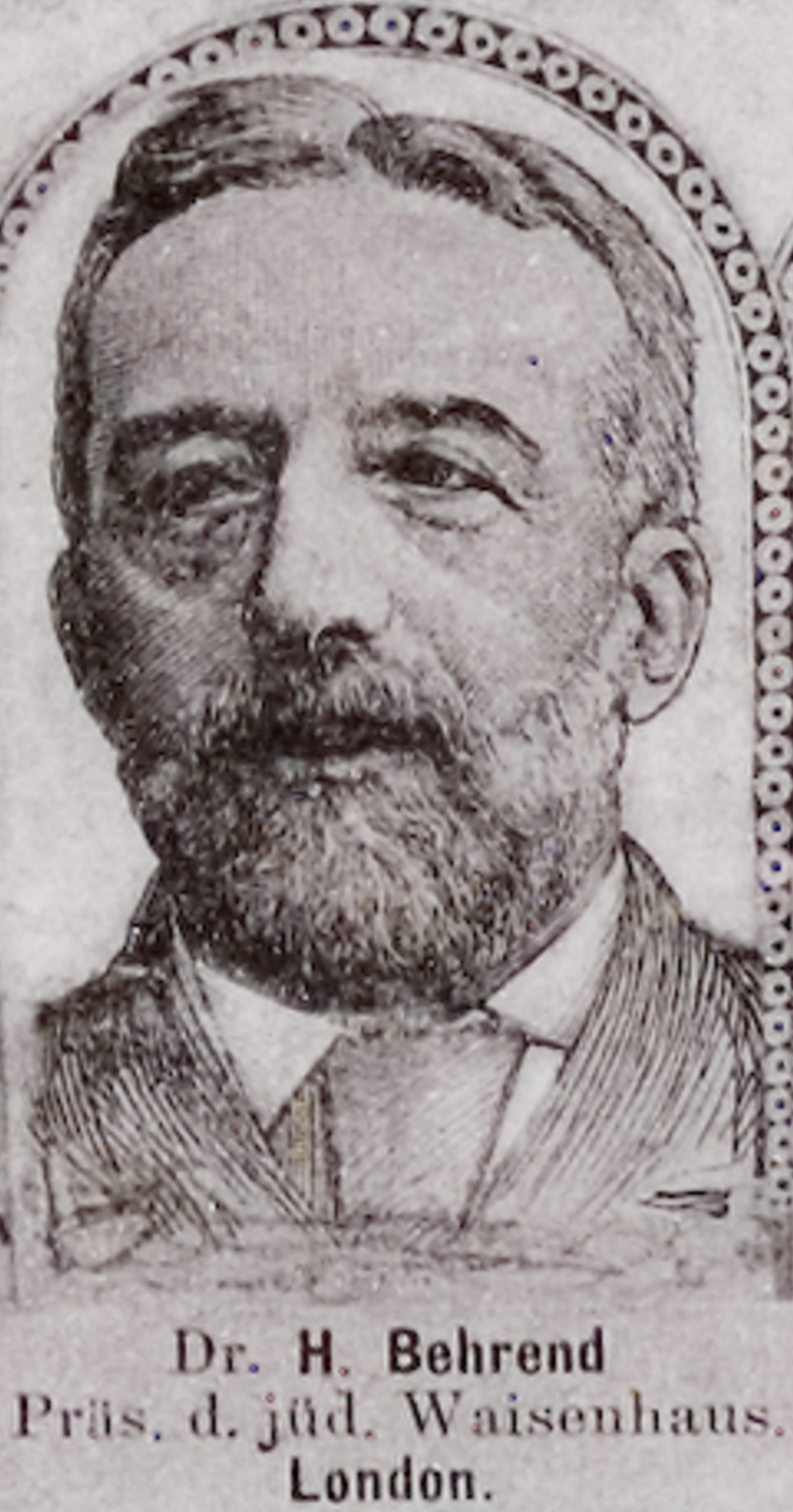
- Photograph of Behrend
- Born: 1828; Liverpool, England
- Died: 28 November 1893 (aged 65); London, England
- Occupation: Physician
- Medical career
- Institutions: Liverpool Dispensary; Jews' Hospital and Orphan Asylum
- Sub-specialties: Public health

Henry Behrend (1828 – 28 November 1893) was a British physician, public health advocate and Jewish communal leader active in Liverpool and London during the nineteenth century.

== Early life and education ==
Behrend was born into a Jewish family in Liverpool in 1828. He pursued medical studies at University College Hospital in London and later continued his studies at Manchester.

== Medical career ==
Title page of The Communicability to Man of Diseases from Animals Used as Food (1881)

In 1850, Behrend was elected a member of the Royal College of Surgeons of England. He became a licentiate of the Royal College of Physicians of Edinburgh in 1859 and was elected a member of the same institution in 1868.

He began his professional practice in Liverpool, where he served as honorary physician to the Liverpool Dispensary and other local institutions. He also held the post of surgeon in a Lancashire militia regiment. Later he established a successful practice in London.

Behrend contributed extensively to medical literature. In 1852, he published a series of articles in The Lancet on the recent cholera epidemic. His studies on zoonotic transmission were translated into several European languages. He published writings defending sheḥitah and other Jewish dietary regulations. His article "Diseases Caught from Butchers' Meat" appeared in The Nineteenth Century and was later reprinted along with related contributions in book form.

In his writings on tuberculosis, Behrend argued that human and bovine forms of the disease were closely related and transmissible between species, and criticized the inadequacy of contemporary meat inspection practices in England. He observed the rarity of tuberculosis among Jewish patients, and pointed to the high rate of animal rejections during slaughter under Jewish dietary regulations as a possible factor in reducing exposure.

He also lectured on both medical and archaeological topics before scholarly societies.

== Communal work ==
Behrend played a central role in the administration of the Jews' Hospital and Orphan Asylum at Norwood. He was elected chairman of the committee in 1868, vice-president in 1869, and president in 1871. His leadership was credited with strengthening the institution and establishing its reputation as one of the best-managed orphan asylums in the United Kingdom at that time.

== Death and funeral ==
Behrend died in London on 28 November 1893, aged 65. A funeral service was held at his residence in Norfolk Crescent, followed by interment at Willesden Cemetery. The service was attended by relatives, colleagues, members of the Jews' Hospital and Orphan Asylum committees, and Chief Rabbi Hermann Adler. Boys from the Norwood institution were also present.

A memorial service was later held at the Jews' Hospital and Orphan Asylum, where the Chief Rabbi delivered a sermon in his memory.

== Selected publications ==
- "On the Employment of Chloroform Injections in the Treatment of Gonorrhœa". The Lancet. 60 (1505): 6–7. July 3, 1852.
- "Report of Three Cases of Asiatic Cholera". The Lancet. 62 (1567): 245–246. September 10, 1853.
- "On the Ferruginous Treatment of Primary Syphilis (Part I)". The Lancet. 68 (1733): 534–536. November 15, 1856.
- "On the Ferruginous Treatment of Primary Syphilis (Part II)". The Lancet. 68 (1738): 673–676. December 20, 1856.
- "On the Action of the Bromide of Potassium in Inducing Sleep". The Lancet. 83 (2126): 607–608. May 28, 1864.
- "On the Employment of Extract of Belladonna in the Treatment of Irritable Bladder". The Lancet. 73 (1869): 630–631. June 25, 1859.
- The Communicability to Man of Diseases from Animals Used as Food. London: Asher I. Myers. 1881.
- "Diseases Caught from Butcher's Meat". The Nineteenth Century. 26 (151): 409–422. September 1889.
- "Tuberculous Meat and Its Consequences". The Eclectic Magazine of Foreign Literature, Science, and Art. 52 (1): 783–794. July 1890.
- Cattle Tuberculosis and Tuberculous Meat. London: F. Calder-Turner. 1893.
