= Jelena Behrend =

Serbian-American jewelry designer (born 1968)

- Born: 1968 (age 57–58); Serbia
- Occupation: Jewelry designer
- Known for: Hammered chains
- Website: https://www.jelenabehrendstudio.com

Jelena Behrend (born 1968) is a Serbian-born American jewelry designer based out of the Lower East Side in New York City. Described as fashion forward by New York (magazine), her hammered pieces have been seen on Hollywood celebrities and in feature films.

== Early life and education ==
Originally a writer from Serbia, Behrend transitioned to jewelry making after emigrating to the United States in 1988. Unable to pursue a career in writing, she turned to the visual arts to express herself. Having acquired some technical skills when she was younger, Behrend was able to train with a master jeweler in Los Angeles before returning to New York City to open her first studio on Catharine Street. She began by making wholesale jewellery for large department stores. Then, in 1996, she decided to focus on more personal pieces. Before owning her current namesake studio, she co-owned the Oxygène Collectif atelier with former Wilhelmina model Maria Luisa Mosquera.

== Career ==
Her hand-forged, hand-hammered, and hand-carved jewelry is of Hollywood's most memorable characters. Behrend is known in fashion circles for her handmade gender blurring jewelry, featured in many magazine layouts and also seen in the film The Girl With The Dragon Tattoo. Her pieces have been worn by Madonna, Lenny Kravitz and Gwyneth Paltrow, and are sold in high-end boutiques or are custom-made. Relying on recycled metals, all of Behrend's work is hand forged using old tools. Her signature pieces are hammered chains that eschew mass production and are inspired by the jewelry worn by European gypsies.

In 2008, Behrend produced a storefront installation with the artist Lisa Kirk, designed for a special edition of the fragrance Revolution.

Live FAST Magazine describes Behrend's pieces as being raw and edgy, stating that she "..holds true to the purest idea of an artisan". Her technique also reveals a soulful approach to jewelry making. According to Behrend, "My biggest fear is that it is finished. You have to know when to stop. It has to still be alive." In 2011, the Fitzroy Gallery located in Soho, Manhattan paid tribute to Behrend's methodology by exhibiting various videos, assemblages, and photographs regarding her work.
