= Hermann-Heinrich Behrend =

German World War II general

- Born: 25 August 1898; Perleberg, German Empire
- Died: 19 June 1987 (aged 88); Soltau, West Germany
- Military career
- Allegiance: German Empire; Weimar Republic; Nazi Germany
- Branch: Prussian Army; Reichsheer; German Army
- Service years: 1915–1920; 1924–1945
- Rank: Generalmajor
- Commands: 490th Infantry Division
- Conflicts: World War I World War II: Eastern Front
- Awards: Knight's Cross of the Iron Cross with Oak Leaves and Swords

Hermann-Heinrich Behrend (25 August 1898 – 19 June 1987) was a German general during World War II. He was a recipient of the Knight's Cross of the Iron Cross with Oak Leaves and Swords of Nazi Germany.

Behrend was born on 25 August 1898 in Perleberg in the Kingdom of Prussia. He joined the German Army on 1 June 1915. He fought on the Eastern Front of World War I. He was transferred to the 1st Infantry Division on 5 November 1915. While serving with this unit he was promoted to Unteroffizier (corporal) on 29 March 1916. He was promoted to Fähnrich (ensign) in 1917 for his bravery before the enemy and to Leutnant (second lieutenant) the same year.

== Awards ==
- Iron Cross (1914) 2nd Class (9 June 1917) & 1st Class (4 November 1918)
- Military Merit Cross, 2nd Class (Mecklenburgisch-Schwerinsches-Verdienstkreuz) (2 January 1918)
- Honour Cross of the World War 1914/1918 (21 January 1935)
- Clasp to the Iron Cross (1939) 2nd Class (12 May 1940) & 1st Class (10 June 1940)
- Eastern Front Medal (29 July 1942)
- Infantry Assault Badge in Silver (20 April 1943)
- Wound Badge (1939) in Silver (29 July 1942) & in Gold (2 February 1944)
- Knight's Cross of the Iron Cross with Oak Leaves and Swords
  - Knight's Cross on 15 July 1941 as Major and commander of the I./Infanterie-Regiment 489
  - Oak Leaves on 6 March 1944 as Oberst and commander of Grenadier-Regiment 154
  - Swords on 26 April 1945 as Generalmajor and commander of the 490. Infanterie-Division f

Military offices
Preceded by Generalmajor Ernst Wißelinck	Commander of Division Nr. 490/490. Infantrie-Division; 1 April 1945 – 8 May 1945	Succeeded by disbanded
