= Rita Behrend =

East German canoeist

Medal record

Women's canoe slalom

Representing East Germany

World Championships
Gold medal – first place	1959 Geneva	Mixed C-2

Rita Behrend is a retired slalom canoeist who competed for East Germany in the late 1950s. She won a gold medal in the mixed C-2 event at the 1959 ICF Canoe Slalom World Championships in Geneva.
