= Robert Dudley Best =

British manufacturer

Robert Dudley Best (1892–1984) was a British manufacturer deeply involved with the Modern design movement in and immediately after the interwar years. He took over Best & Lloyd, his father's light industrial engineering works in Birmingham, having previously trained as a metal designer at art school in Düsseldorf. He went on to design the Bestlite, an iconic Bauhaus-styled desk lamp that remains in production and was used by Winston Churchill in Whitehall.

Best was an early apostle of the posture therapist F.M. Alexander of the Alexander Technique, campaigned for better art-school education for industrial apprentices, and was a founder of the Common Wealth Party in 1942. His social circle included a group of Birmingham artists and intellectuals including Prof. Philip Sargant Florence and others associated with Birmingham University. He also befriended Nikolaus Pevsner during Pevsner's 15 months in Birmingham between 1934-5, and hosted the first visit of Walter Gropius to the Midlands after Gropius's departure from Germany in 1934.

Best wrote prolifically, though only one of his books was published in his lifetime: Brass Chandelier, his history of his father's experiments with metal manufacturing and promotion of progressive German pedagogic ideas, which Pevsner reviewed in the Architectural Review.

Best's history of his own early life and that of his younger brother Frank, both of whom served in the First World War, was published posthumously in 2020 as From Bedales to the Boche.
