= Centre for Contemporary History =

Research institute in Potsdam, Germany

Coordinates: 52.396039°N 13.058069°E

The Leibniz Centre for Contemporary History Potsdam (German: Leibniz-Zentrum für Zeithistorische Forschung, abbreviated ZZF) is an interdisciplinary research institute focusing on the contemporary history of Europe, especially Germany, and member of the Leibniz Association.

== History ==
The ZZF, located in Potsdam, Germany, was established in 1996 as the continuation of the Max Planck Society research program on Contemporary History, founded in 1992. Its main operation was supported by the state of Brandenburg, with additional financial backing from the Deutsche Forschungsgemeinschaft (German Research Foundation) for specific projects. Since 2009 the ZZF is a member of the Gottfried Wilhelm Leibniz Scientific Community and therefore mainly funded to equal parts by the German Ministry of Education and Research and the Länder.

As of October 2022, its current director is Frank Bösch. Past directors include Jürgen Kocka, Christoph Kleßmann, Konrad H. Jarausch, and Martin Sabrow.

== Research ==
The centre cooperates with the doctoral programs of several universities, and other research programs. The emphasis is on production of scholarly papers and dissertations on the partition of Germany after world War II, the comparison of post-war dictatorial regimes in Central and Eastern Europe, and the history and transformation of European memory. The centre also organizes joint academic conferences, accepts visiting scholars, and coordinates memorials and museums. Additionally, the centre also engages in the production of non-academic public lectures, conferences, workshops and multimedia based websites.

== Publications ==
The centre publishes several publications and websites:

- Zeithistorische Forschungen / Studies in Contemporary History, an open access journal published also in print by Vandenhoeck & Ruprecht. The journal contains both German and English articles, each with an abstract in both languages.
- Zeithistorische Studien (Contemporary Historical Studies), a monograph series of which up to 2010 have been published 47 titles.
- Geschichte der Gegenwart (The History of the Present), a monograph series (since 2010).
- ZeitRäume (TimeSpaces), an almanac.
- Zeitgeschichte-online (ContemporaryHistory-online), a web portal.

Sites on the portal devoted to the Uprising of 1953 in East Germany (17Juni53.de) and on the history of the Berlin Wall (Chronik-der-Mauer.de) are particularly frequently used. The centre also designed the website Ungarn1956.de (Hungary1956), on the Hungarian Revolution of 1956 jointly with the “Bundesstiftung zur Aufarbeitung der SED-Diktatur” (Foundation for the Reconciliation of the SED Dictatorship) and the Collegium Hungaricum Berlin.

== See also ==
- Institute of Contemporary History (Munich)
