= Piers Anthony bibliography =

Piers Anthony (born Piers Anthony Dillingham Jacob, August 6, 1934) is an American author in the science fiction and fantasy genres.

Many of his books have appeared on The New York Times Best Seller list. He is best known for his long-running Xanth novel series, which was ranked number 99 in a 2011 NPR readers' poll of best science fiction and fantasy books.

== Fiction ==
=== Novels ===
==== Aton/Worlds of Chthon series ====
The series is continued by Charles Platt with Anthony's permission.

1. Chthon (1967) Anthony's first published novel; nominated for the Hugo and Nebula Awards
2. Phthor (1975)

==== Battle Circle series ====
1. Sos the Rope (1968)
2. Var the Stick (1972)
3. Neq the Sword (1975)

Books 1–3 were omnibused as Battle Circle (1978).

==== Of Man and Manta series ====
1. Omnivore (1968)
2. Orn (1970)
3. 0X (1976) Note: title is commonly listed as OX ("oh-ex"), but should be 0X (Arabic zero·Roman ten). (Chapter 16: "'I am speaking for 0X,' the computer said. 'This is the code designation Zero X, or Arabic numeral nothing multiplied by the Roman numeral ten'")

Books 1–3 were collected as Of Man and Manta (1986).

==== Jason Striker series (with Roberto Fuentes) ====
1. Kiai! (1974)
2. Mistress of Death (1974)
3. Bamboo Bloodbath (1974)
4. Ninja's Revenge (1975)
5. Amazon Slaughter (1976)
6. Curse of the Ninja (2001)

==== Xanth series ====
Anthony's most extensive series, with 49 novels and counting.

1. A Spell for Chameleon (1977)
2. The Source of Magic (1979)
3. Castle Roogna (1979)
4. Centaur Aisle (1982)
5. Ogre, Ogre (1982) Ogre, Ogre was the first paperback original fantasy novel to appear on the New York Times Bestseller List.
6. Night Mare (1983)
7. Dragon on a Pedestal (1983)
8. Crewel Lye (1984)
9. Golem in the Gears (1986)
10. Vale of the Vole (1987)
11. Heaven Cent (1988)
12. Man from Mundania (1989)
13. Isle of View (1990)
14. Question Quest (1991)
15. The Color of Her Panties (1992)
16. Demons Don't Dream (1992)
17. Harpy Thyme (1993)
18. Geis of the Gargoyle (1994)
19. Roc and a Hard Place (1995)
20. Yon Ill Wind (1996)
21. Faun & Games (1997)
22. Zombie Lover (1998)
23. Xone of Contention (1999)
24. The Dastard (2000)
25. Swell Foop (2001)
26. Up in a Heaval (2002)
27. Cube Route (2003)
28. Currant Events (2004)
29. Pet Peeve (2005)
30. Stork Naked (2006)
31. Air Apparent (2007)
32. Two to the Fifth (2008)
33. Jumper Cable (2009)
34. Knot Gneiss (2010)
35. Well-Tempered Clavicle (2011)
36. Luck of the Draw (2012)
37. Esrever Doom (2013)
38. Board Stiff (2013)
39. Five Portraits (2014)
40. Isis Orb (2016)
41. Ghost Writer in the Sky (2017)
42. Fire Sail (2019)
43. Jest Right (2020)
44. Skeleton Key (2021)
45. A Tryst of Fate (2021)
46. Six Crystal Princesses (2022)
47. Apoca Lips (2023)
48. Three Novel Nymphs (2025)
49. Knickelpede Knight (2026)
50. Limbo(forthcoming)
51. Fusia’s Friends (forthcoming)
52. Sirens (awaiting proofreading)
53. Green Future (tentative title)

Books 1–3 were collected as The Magic of Xanth (1981) // Three Complete Xanth Novels / The Quest for Magic, while books 4–6 were collected as The Continuing Xanth Saga.

==== Cluster series ====
1. Cluster (1977; also known as Vicinity Cluster in UK edition)
2. Chaining the Lady (1978)
3. Kirlian Quest (1978)
4. Thousandstar (1980)
5. Viscous Circle (1982)

==== Tarot series ====
This was originally written as single novel in continuity with the Cluster series, which takes place decades later, but was split up due to length at the behest of the publisher, Jove.

- God of Tarot (1979)
- Vision of Tarot (1980)
- Faith of Tarot (1980)
- Tarot (1987) The series omnibus as a single novel as originally intended

==== Apprentice Adept series ====
1. Split Infinity (1980)
2. Blue Adept (1981)
3. Juxtaposition (1982)
4. Out of Phaze (1987)
5. Robot Adept (1988)
6. Unicorn Point (1989)
7. Phaze Doubt (1990)

Books 1–3 were collected as Double Exposure (1982).

==== Incarnations of Immortality series ====
1. On a Pale Horse (1983) (Also released in a five part comic book series by Innovation Books (1991))
2. Bearing an Hourglass (1984)
3. With a Tangled Skein (1985)
4. Wielding a Red Sword (1986)
5. Being a Green Mother (1987)
6. For Love of Evil (1988)
7. And Eternity (1990)
8. Under a Velvet Cloak (2007)

Book 1–2 were collected as Incarnations of Immortality (2013).

==== Bio of a Space Tyrant series ====
1. Refugee (1983)
2. Mercenary (1984)
3. Politician (1985)
4. Executive (1985)
5. Statesman (1986)
6. The Iron Maiden (2001)

==== The Adventures of Kelvin of Rud series ====
1. Dragon's Gold (1987) with Robert E. Margroff
2. Serpent's Silver (1988) with Robert E. Margroff
3. Chimaera's Copper (1990) with Robert E. Margroff
4. Orc's Opal (1990) with Robert E. Margroff
5. Mouvar's Magic (1992) with Robert E. Margroff

Books 1–3 were collected as Across the Frames (1992), and as Three Complete Novels (1994), while books 4–5 were collected as Final Magic (1992).

==== Pornucopia series ====
1. Pornucopia (1989)
2. The Magic Fart (2003)

Books 1–2 were collected as The Pornucopia Compendium (2015).

==== Mode series ====
1. Virtual Mode (1991)
2. Fractal Mode (1992)
3. Chaos Mode (1993)
4. DoOon Mode (2001)

==== Geodyssey series ====
1. Isle of Woman (1993)
2. Shame of Man (1994)
3. Hope of Earth (1997)
4. Muse of Art (1999)
5. Climate of Change (2010)

==== ChroMagic series ====
1. Key to Havoc (2002)
2. Key to Chroma (2003)
3. Key to Destiny (2004)
4. Key to Liberty (2007)
5. Key to Survival (2008)

==== Aladdin series (with J.R. Rain) ====
1. Aladdin Relighted (2011)
2. Aladdin Sins Bad (2011)
3. Aladdin and the Flying Dutchman (2012)

==== Metal Maiden series ====
1. To Be a Woman (2012)
2. Shepherd (2012)
3. Flytrap (2012)
4. Awares (2012)

==== Aliena series ====
1. Aliena (2013)
2. Aliena Too (2014)

==== Hair series ====
1. Hair Power (2016)
2. Hair Suite (2017)
3. Hair Peace (2019)

=== Other ===
- The Ring (1968) with Robert E. Margroff
- Macroscope (1969) 1970 Hugo Award for Best Novel nomination. The UK edition (Sphere) was cut by about 25%.
- Hasan (1969; 1977 revised)
- The E.S.P. Worm (1970) with Robert E. Margroff
- Prostho Plus (1971)
- Race Against Time (1973)
- Rings of Ice (1974)
- Triple Détente (1974)
- Steppe (1976)
- But What of Earth? (1976: "collaboration" with Robert Coulson; 1989: Anthony's original republished, with annotations) see main article.
- Pretender (1979) with Frances Hall, ISBN 0-89370-130-0
- Mute (1981) a sequel named "Moot" was shelved, with extensive notes. Those notes are now lost and that sequel will not be written.
- Shade of the Tree (1986)
- Ghost (1986)
- Total Recall (1989) a novelization of the film Total Recall, which is based on the short story "We Can Remember It For You Wholesale" by Philip K. Dick. The UK and US editions are different.
- Through the Ice (1989) with Robert Kornwise posthumously—Kornwise was a high school student who had died. His friends sent his unfinished manuscript and a plea to Piers Anthony to help their deceased friend get published. To make sure that the book was a fitting memorial tribute, Piers Anthony made sure it was printed on acid-free paper despite the expense.
- Firefly (1990)
- Hard Sell (1990)
- Dead Morn (1990) with Roberto Fuentes
- Balook (1991)
- MerCycle (1991)
- Tatham Mound (1991)
- The Caterpillar's Question (1992) with Philip José Farmer—This collaboration was actually the result of another proposed collaborative project. The original idea proposed by an editor was to have a book where each chapter was written by a different author. That project fell apart, but Piers Anthony and Philip José Farmer later decided they wanted to salvage something from it by morphing it into a two-person collaboration, where the two alternated chapters, without revealing who wrote which chapters.
- Killobyte (1993)
- If I Pay Thee Not in Gold (1993) with Mercedes Lackey
- Volk (1996) historical fiction that is atypical for Anthony
- The Willing Spirit (1996) with Alfred Tella
- Spider Legs (1998) with Clifford A. Pickover
- Quest for the Fallen Star (1998) with James Richey and Alan Riggs
- Dream a Little Dream (1998) with Julie Brady
- Realty Check (1999)
- The Secret of Spring (2000) with Jo Anne Taeusch
- The Gutbucket Quest (2000) with Ron Leming
- Starkweather: Immortal 0 (2007) with David A. Rodriguez—This collaboration is a different one for Piers Anthony. He crafted an original short story based on the character Cartaphilus from the creator-owned Starkweather comic book series by David A. Rodriguez. This short story was then adapted into a comic book script and painted by fantasy artist Patrick McEvoy and published by Archaia Studios, making Starkweather: Immortal issue 0, Piers Anthony's first true comic book work.
- Tortoise Reform (2007)
- The Sopaths (2011)
- Eroma (2011)
- Writer's Retweet (2016) from Dreaming Big Publications
- Captive (2016) from eXcessica Publishing
- Jack and the Giants (2014) with J. R. Rain from Rain Press
- Dragon Assassin (2013) with J. R. Rain
- Dolfin Tayle with J. R. Rain
- LavaBull with J. R. Rain
- Noah's Brick
- Odd Exam
- Pandora Park
- Pira
- Service Goat

=== Short story collections ===
- Anthonology (1985)
- Alien Plot (1992)
- Cautionary Tales (2014) published by Open Road Media
- Lava from the Chronology Anthology (2015) published by Curiosity Quills Press
- In the Shadow of the Song from the Darkscapes Anthology (2017) published by Curiosity Quills Press

==== Relationships series ====
1. Relationships (2006), republished in 2007 by Phaze Books
2. Relationships, Vol. 2 (2007), published by Phaze Books
3. Relationships, Vol. 3 (2008), published by Phaze Books
4. Relationships 4 (2010), published by Phaze Books
5. Relationships 5 (erotic stories) Phaze 2012; Dreaming Big to come
6. Relationships 6 Dreaming Big 2018
7. Relationships 7 Dreaming Big 2019
8. Relationships 8 to come

== Nonfiction ==
- Bio of an Ogre (1988): the autobiography of Piers Anthony to age 50
- Letters to Jenny (1994): The mother of a teenage fan wrote to Piers Anthony about her daughter Jenny, the victim of a drunk driver, being paralyzed and in a coma. The mother felt that having letters from Jenny's favorite author read to her might help bring her out of her coma. He wrote her constantly and for a long period of time, even naming a Xanth character after her. Jenny eventually came out of her coma, but remains paralyzed and has difficulty communicating. This book is a collection of the letters from the first year of correspondence.
- How Precious Was That While (2001): an autobiography of Piers Anthony to age 65
- Alfred (2007): a biography of the author's father, Alfred Jacob, as told by the women in his father's life

== Related works ==
- Cut by Emerald (1987) by Dana Kramer, a Combat Command game book set in the Bio of a Space Tyrant universe.
- Encyclopedia of Xanth (1987) by Jody Lynn Nye, a Crossroads Adventure game book set in the Xanth universe.
- Piers Anthony's Visual Guide to Xanth (Harper, 1989), by Piers Anthony and Jody Lynn Nye. Illustrated by Todd Cameron Hamilton and James Clouse. ISBN 0-380-75749-4.
