= List of Xanth characters =

The following is a list of characters in the Xanth series of fantasy genre novels by Piers Anthony (b. 1934).

== Major characters ==
=== Magicians ===
The Magicians are a subset of fictional characters in the series. They are usually humans and possess powerful magical abilities. As such, they are the only humans able to take the role of King of Human Xanth. While this role previously could not be held by Sorceresses (female Magicians), they were later allowed to become Kings of Xanth.

==== Arnolde ====
Arnolde, a rare centaur magician, is introduced in Centaur Aisle. Initially, his talent is described as the ability to generate an aisle of magic around his body when he is in Mundania. When Arnolde is ninety, his magic is discovered and he is banished from Centaur Isle by his fellow centaurs. Arnolde is well regarded by humans; his magical ability enabled the rescue of King Trent and Queen Iris from a Mundanian prison. He is an acting-king during the reign of Trent.

In Night Mare, when Arnolde is ninety-eight, he is for a short time, a centaur king. During his reign, he declares that Sorceresses are merely female Magicians, and therefore eligible to serve as Kings of Xanth. In Golem in the Gears, Arnolde reveals that when he carries reverse wood, he is able to create an aisle of non-magic in Xanth. The true nature of Arnolde's talent is revealed in Currant Events.

==== Bink ====
Bink is the Magician of Magical Invulnerability and the main character in the first two novels of the Xanth series, A Spell for Chameleon and The Source of Magic. He is the son of Roland of the High Council and Bianca. He serves as king pro-tem during Trent's reign.

Bink is banished for not possessing a magic talent when, in fact, he does possess magical ability. Bink's magic does not want to be known because, if it were, those of non-magical means would injure Bink and his family, with the magic being indirectly responsible. Hence, in order to keep itself hidden, Bink's magic works in quiet ways, by seeming coincidence, and very few people know of it. For example, it causes an invisible giant to walk by just as Bink was to reveal his magic whilst under a truth spell. Furthermore, Bink's magic protects him, making him seem an unusually lucky man.

==== Dawn ====
Dawn's magical ability allows her to know anything about the animate. She is the daughter of Dolph and Electra. She and her twin, Eve, appear in Faun & Games. In Well-Tempered Clavicle, she marries Pick a Bone. Her children with him are a human boy named Piton and a skeleton girl named Data.

==== Dolph ====
Dolph is the Magician of Metamorphosis. He has the power to transform and shapeshift into anything. His parents are Dor and Irene. Dolph was engaged to Nada Naga but chose to marry Electra. His twin sorceress daughters are Dawn and Eve. He is a protagonist in Heaven Cent and Isle of View.

==== Dor ====
Magician Dor is the son of Bink and Chameleon. He served as king pro-tem during Trent's reign. Dor is able to make inanimate objects, such as rocks, clouds, water, and bones, speak. He is married to Irene. The stork delivered them two children, Princess Ivy and Prince Dolph and they have a third child with magical ability, Princess Ida. Dor appears in Castle Roogna, Centaur Aisle, Ogre, Ogre, and Night Mare.

==== Eve ====
Through her magic, Eve knows all about the inanimate. She is the daughter of Dolph and Electra. She and her twin sister, Dawn, appear in Faun & Games and in Jumper Cable, where they fight over a boy.

==== Grey ====
Grey is the Magician of Magic Nullification. This means he can nullify magic near him and then restore it stronger than it was before. He is the son of Magician Murphy and Neo-Sorceress Vadne. He married Sorceress Ivy, who rescued him from Mundania in Man from Mundania. He is the father of the triplet Sorceresses, Melody, Harmony, and Rhythm. On Ptero, a moon of Ida, when Grey is older, he is known as the royal consort because his wife, Ivy, is a future King of Xanth. Captain of Xanth's star-ship, the Beta, during a dream voyage to rescue centaur expedition Alpha in Board Stiff from Demoness Fornax.

==== Grundy Golem ====
Grundy was a sarcastic doll-sized golem made out of string and clay by Magician Humfrey. He was given the ability to speak to any living creature, capable of understanding all languages from human to plants. Eventually he is turned into a real man by X(A/N)^{th} but retains his diminutive height.

==== Ida ====
Ida is the Sorceress of the Idea: within limits, any idea presented to her may come to be. Ida must first believe that the idea will eventuate and the idea must come to her from someone who is unaware of her magical ability. Ida is the twin sister of Princess Ivy, although this may have been the result of her own talent. In Knot Gneiss, Ida weds Prince Hilarion. A small moon called Ptero orbits over her, holding every person in Xanth there ever was or might be. The Ida on Ptero has another moon (Pyramid) where the inhabitants use a barter system that results in givers gaining size and receivers losing size. This Ida has Torus, whose Ida has Cone, whose Ida has Dumbbell, and so on. This continues into infinity, with each moon having different shapes, inhabitants, and rules. Thus, Ida is the caretaker of every conceivable and inconceivable idea. The chain of moons extends to Mundania and cycles back to Ida herself. In the later books of the Xanth series, a visit to Ida is highly desired.

==== Ilene ====
Ilene is the Sorceress of Making Illusions Real. For instance, she is able to make an illusion of maturity an actuality. Ilene is the daughter of Iris and Trent (after their rejuvenation).

==== Irene ====
The beautiful, green haired Irene is the Sorceress of Plants. She was able to create a massive arboreal defence about Castle Roogna. When she was King of Xanth, Arnold Centaur decreed her magical ability "Magician level". Irene is the daughter of Trent and Iris. Her husband is Dor and her children, raised under her stern eye, are Ivy, Ida, and Dolph. Irene succeeded her mother, Iris, as a female King of Xanth. Irene was a protagonist in Centaur Aisle and Dragon on a Pedestal. She served as king pro-tem during the reign of Trent.

==== Iris ====
Iris is the Sorceress of Illusion. She can create illusions in all of the five senses, including illusions of silence and invisibility, and hold them in place with minimal effort. Her illusion can exist a short way into the non-magical realm. Iris possesses a devious and keen intellect. She is a Queen of Xanth by her marriage to Trent. She is also the first contemporary female King of Xanth. Iris is the mother of Irene. She is a protagonist in A Spell for Chameleon and Night Mare. Later in the series, she makes a rejuvenated appearance in Geis of the Gargoyle.

==== Ivy ====
Ivy is the Sorceress of Enhancement. She can enhance people and objects; for example, by improving their endurance and aim. Ivy is capable of enhancing any quality she desires, or even to make things as she unconsciously perceives them; for example, when she first met Humphrey's son Hugo, who was described as mentally slow and had the talent to conjure rotten fruit, she enhanced his qualities while he was in her presence, making him more intelligent and giving him the ability to conjure ripe fruit, all because she perceived him as intelligent. Ivy is the daughter of Dor and Irene. She has blonde hair with a tinge of green (from her mother). Ivy's twin sister is Ida. Ivy is married to Magician Grey. Their children are the triplets, Sorceresses Melody, Harmony, and Rhythm. Ivy is a protagonist in Dragon on a Pedestal, Crewel Lye: A Caustic Yarn, and Man from Mundania.

==== Kadence ====
Kadence is the Sorceress of Alignment who can make anything move in step, to a common beat. Her mother is Princess Rhythm and her father is Cyrus, the first cyborg in Xanth.

==== Melody, Harmony, and Rhythm ====
The Triplet Sorceresses are the children of Ivy and Grey. Melody has blonde hair with a tinge of green and blue eyes like her mother, Harmony has brown eyes and hair like her father, and Rhythm has red hair and green eyes like her cousin, Dawn. Their magical ability allows them to create or enable anything they envision while playing music. If two of the three play together, the power is squared and if all three play, it is cubed. Melody hums, Harmony plays the harmonica and Rhythm beats her drum.

==== Murphy ====
Murphy is the Magician who Makes Things Go Wrong. He unsuccessfully challenged for the monarchy and was exiled for a time, and returned to Xanth with a promise of allegiance. Murphy has a son, Grey, with Sorceress Vadne. Murphy first appeared in Castle Roogna. He has served as king pro tem during Dor's reign.

==== Patxi ====
Paxti is a magician who creates enchanted paths that can prevent the passage of any creature. He appears in Cube Route.

==== Ragna Roc ====
Ragna Roc is a powerful magician bird. He is able to make an illusion real or make reality an illusion, but he cannot repeat such a transformation: that is, he cannot reverse the "real-ness" of something he has already reversed.

==== Rempel ====
Rempel is a centaur magician whose talent is to know the talents of others. He is introduced in Xone of Contention.

==== Sea Hag ====
Sea Hag is the Sorceress of Immortality and a member of the first human colony of Xanth. On her death, Sea Hag inhabits and possesses another male or female body. The character is introduced in Golem in the Gears and given further explanation in Question Quest and The Dastard.

==== Sherlock ====
Sherlock is the Magician of Reversal who can reverse the nature or characteristics of any person or object. His wife is Clio and his adopted child is Ciriana. Sherlock is introduced in Demons Don't Dream, in the company of his friend Dug Mundane, and returns in Currant Events, where he discovers his magical ability.

==== Surprise ====
Surprise is the Sorceress of Talents who can use any magical ability, but only once. However, by using her imagination, she is able to endlessly reproduce any effect. Her parents are Grundy Golem and Rapunzel. Surprise was in fact a surprise to her parents, as the stork delivered her when she was five. She is a central figure in Geis of the Gargoyle and Stork Naked. She has a daughter by Umlaut. In The Dastard, it is discovered that she can reuse talents she's used before after a long time has passed, but the Dastard "unhappens" this discovery.

==== Tallyho ====
Tallyho is the Magician of Talents, who creates and assigns magical abilities to newly conceived babies. He lives in the Gourd. His predecessor was the Magician of Talents who assigned the talent of cursing to all the descendants of the original Curse Fiends. The character is introduced in Up In A Heaval.

==== Tapis ====
Tapis is the Sorceress of Tapestry. She created enchanted tapestries, including one decorating Castle Roogna. Tapis is married to Merlin. She is the mother of Jonathan and Taplin, and she takes in Electra.

==== Vadne ====
Vadne is the Sorceress of Topology: she can change the shape of an object without altering its size, mass, or intrinsic properties. She marries Magician Murphy and they have a son, Magician Grey. Dor decreed her ability to be Magician-level.

=== Kings of Xanth ===
The Kings of Xanth are humans who possess a magical talent that is strong enough for them to be classified as a Magician, a pre-requisite for the role. This list is composed of the Kings of Xanth in order of their reign. This does not include the magicians that served as king pro-tem (Bink, Dor, Irene) during the reign of King Trent unless they had previously served formally.

==== Merlin ====
Merlin, the first King of Xanth and Magician of Knowledge, reigns from 204 to 228. He marries Tapis, and their children are Jonathan and Taplin.

==== Roogna ====
Roogna, the second King of Xanth, reigns from 228 until 286. Roogna is able to "adapt" the magic of living things, changing it into a similar but distinct form of magic. He builds Castle Roogna, named for him, which becomes the home of the monarchy of Xanth in A Spell for Chameleon. Roogna marries Taplin, Merlin's daughter.

==== Rana ====
Rana, the Magician of Creation, is the third King and the first female King of Xanth. She rules from 286 to 325. She is the mother of Rune.

==== Reitas ====
Reitas, the Magician of Problem Solving, is the fourth King of Xanth, reigning from 325 to 350. Despite his title, he created problems.

==== Rune ====
Rune, the Magician of Evocation, is the fifth King of Xanth. He rules from 350 to 378. His mother is Rana.

==== Jonathan ====
Jonathan, the Magician of Zombies or Zombie Master, is the sixth King of Xanth and reigns from 378 to 478. He is able to re-animate the dead of Xanth. He himself was once a zombie. Jonathan is the son of King Merlin and Sorceress Tapis. He is married to Millie the Ghost; they have twin children, Hiatus and Lacuna. He appears in Castle Roogna, Night Mare, and Centaur Aisle. He was twice king pro-tem for Trent.

==== Vortex ====
Vortex, the Magician of Demon Summoning, becomes the seventh King of Xanth in 478.

==== Neytron ====
Neytron, the Magician who Brings Paintings to Life, is the eighth King of Xanth.

==== Nero ====
Nero, the Magician who Brings Golems to Life, is the ninth King of Xanth.

==== Gromden ====
Gromden, the tenth King of Xanth, is able to divine the history of any object he touches. His reign began in 623. While married to a curse fiend, he had a daughter, Threnody by a demoness.

==== Yin-Yang ====
Yin-Yang, eleventh King of Xanth, is able to create invokable spells. Yin is his good self, who creates spells of good alignment, and Yang his evil self, who creates spells of evil. His first wife was Threnody. After her death, Yin-Yang remarried and had a son, Lord Bliss.

==== Muerte A. Fid ====
Fid, is the twelfth King of Xanth, and his talent is alchemy. According to Question Quest, he is, at most, only half human.

==== Quan ====
Quan, the Magician of Herbalism, is the thirteenth King of Xanth. His uncle is Muerte A. Fid.

==== Elona ====
Elona, the Magician of Longevity, is the fourteenth King and second female King of Xanth. Her reign begins in 797.

==== Warren ====
Warren, the fifteenth King of Xanth, is a ghost who can create ghosts. After forty-three years in power, he is exorcised by the people of Xanth.

==== Ebnez ====
Ebnez becomes the sixteenth King of Xanth in 909. He is able to adapt magical inanimate items. Ebnez marries Mnem and their daughters are the Muses. He adapts a stone to make an impenetrable magical field about Xanth, which is later removed by order of King Trent.

==== Humfrey ====
Humfrey, the seventeenth King of Xanth, is the Magician of Information, also known as Good Magician Humfrey. He is an elderly, withered, gnome-like man with five and a half wives. Humfrey is very curious and has a good memory. He is said to possess all knowledge, but his magical talent is actually the ability to find the answers to all questions. In Heaven Cent, it is implied that Humfrey's magical talent may be no more than that of locating other magic that may be of use to him. His story of becoming a master of information is recounted in Question Quest. Humfrey believes his magical abilities are not those of a Magician, and so he studies for a degree in magic at Demon University in order to validate his Magician title.

Humfrey was a king pro-tem during Trent's reign. He lives in the Good Magician's Castle, the former Castle Zombie. It is an enchanted place that provides easy access for Humfrey, but any visitor must face three challenges posed by him. Visitors must prove their worthiness to approach Humphrey with their queries.

Humfrey is the protagonist of Question Quest and is instrumental in every book of the series. He acknowledges characters in non-Xanth books by Piers Anthony, such as in On a Pale Horse.

==== Aeolus ====
Aeolus becomes the eighteenth King of Xanth at the age of twenty-two in 971. He is known as the Magician of Storms, and his talent is the control of the weather. He ruled until his death at ninety-three in A Spell for Chameleon.

His predecessor, Good Magician Humfrey, discovers his abilities when he is six years old. In Question Quest, Humfrey has flashbacks that give details as to how he found Aeolus, how Aeolus became king, and how Aeolus made his famous edict. Aeolus's edict, issued four years into his reign, decrees that anyone born without a magic talent would be exiled from Xanth. In his later years, Aeolus fell into senility, something he never acknowledges.

Later in the series, in Xone of Contention, Magician Grey and Robota, a golem, travel back in time to the events of A Spell for Chameleon. They meet Aeolus and learn he is not the fool he appears: Aeolus keeps his soul in a soular cell that was created centuries before by Magician Yin-Yang. The cell prevents the aging and death of the person whose soul is held within. However, the cell cannot undo aging that occurred before the person's soul was stored. Aeolus' magic resides with his soul, which he removes from the cell only when he needs to use it. Aeolus claims he does not need his soul day to day, and that he feigns senility in order to avoid mundane tasks, but Grey realises that Aeolus' unconscionable behaviour is the result of his lack of soul. Aeolus' efforts to stave off death fail, and he succumbs shortly after Grey and Robota depart.

==== Trent ====
Trent, the nineteenth king of Xanth, is the Magician of Transformation and is a major character throughout the Xanth series. His power allows him to transform any living thing into any other living thing—whatever form he renders becomes one's "natural" form, and any offspring sired or birthed will also be in that form.

In his childhood, Trent was trained by Good Magician Humfrey. After trying to take the throne, he was exiled to Mundania for 20 years, then returned to Xanth and was crowned King after the passing of the Storm King. He later retired and moved to the North Village with his wife Sorceress Iris.

Prior to A Spell for Chameleon, he is known as the Evil Magician for attempting to take over the throne. For this offense he is exiled to Mundania for 20 years. There he married, and he and his wife had a son, but he loses them both to illness. Later, he is accidentally helped back into Xanth by Magician Bink and Chameleon. After the Storm King dies, Trent is made king on the condition that he marry Sorceress Iris. He does so, but only out of convenience. It takes him over twenty years to recover from the loss of his first wife and son, but eventually, he comes to love Iris. In the sixth novel, Night Mare, he steps down as king, after which Bink's son Magician Dor becomes the new King of Xanth with Trent's daughter Sorceress Irene as his wife. Trent now lives in quiet retirement in North Village.

Trent is featured as a main character in A Spell for Chameleon and Centaur Aisle, but makes a reappearance later in the series in Harpy Thyme.

== Minor characters ==
=== Beauregard the Demon ===
A highly intelligent demon of Xanth who is writing a doctoral thesis on the supremacy of demons over other lifeforms entitled "Fallibilities of Other Intelligent Life in Xanth". He repaid a debt to the Good Magician Humfrey, incurred by seeking information from him on other lifeforms, by serving time in a small vial answering questions for people. After repaying the debt, he stayed in the vial to gain further information. Beauregard met Good Magician Humfrey in demon school, where they became friends and greeted each other with insults. In the book Air Apparent, it is revealed that he works as a tour guide in hell, and has fallen in love with Angela Angel, when their toes accidentally brushed a love spring while they were arguing with each other. Angela later returns in Knot Gneiss trying to find substance so she and Beauregard can be together in Xanth.

=== The Brain Coral ===
A form of coral kept in stasis in preservative fluids in the land of Xanth. Its goal was to prevent the awakening of the Demon X(A/N)^{th}, but it failed. Many people are held, or have been held, in its preservative fluids for eventual release including (Neo-)Sorceress Vadne, Magician Murphy, and Harold Harpy. The Brain Coral was a main character in the book The Source of Magic.

=== Chameleon ===
A major supporting character in A Spell for Chameleon, Chameleon is Bink's wife and Dor's mother. She is also known by the aliases Fanchon, Wynne, and Dee. Chameleon's talent is that her physical attractiveness and her intelligence vary inversely, a monthly cycle she cannot control. The transformations complicated her personal life, and she found it convenient to adopt three personas with different names: Wynne is among the most beautiful women in Xanth, but is cognitively impaired to the point of being unable to live independently; Dee is of average appearance and intelligence; and Fanchon is hideously ugly but the smartest person in Xanth. Even though her talent is not magician-caliber, she was named King of Xanth during the Next Wave invasion because she was in her Fanchon phase at the time and thus the person most able to plan a defense of Castle Roogna.

=== Chlorine ===
The wife of the Demon X(A/N)^{th} and mother of Nimbus. She lives in the Nameless Castle. Before she met Demon X(A/N)^{th}, she was plain, mean, and stupid. She wished to be beautiful, smart, and nice, and Nimby (Demon X(A/N)^{th} in disguise) changed her accordingly. Her talent is to poison water; her new intelligence enabled her to use this talent beneficially, by toxifying water just enough to purify it of microbial life. Due to her abusive upbringing, she had only one tear left in her eyes, half a tear in each; shedding that tear would blind her, but she did so when Nimby was set on fire by her horrible parents. This caused X(A/N)^{th} to win a Demon bet, enabling him to save himself and make Chlorine's transformation permanent. Nimby and Chlorine have a son named Nimbus. She has a twin sister named Fluorine, who unfortunately is just as mean and nasty as Chlorine used to be.

=== Demon X(A/N)^{th} ===
The demon whose extended presence created Xanth's magic. He is constantly at battle with Earth, Jupiter, Neptune, and other demons who represent the planets in an astral game of gaining recognition. Earth is currently the most recognized one with Xanth coming dead last because nobody seems to believe in it. X(A/N)^{th} first appears in the second book, The Source of Magic, and is the star of the 20th Xanth book, Yon Ill Wind (as Nimby, a horrendously ugly donkey-headed dragon), and the 23rd, Xone of Contention. He currently enjoys living in the floating castle with his consort Chlorine and son Nimbus. He has also been known to travel in the form of Nimby.

=== Fracto ===
Also called Cumulo-Fracto-Nimbus, this demon cloud roams the land of Xanth, blowing up storms to cause mischief. Later, he tamed Happy Bottom in the Region of Air and had a daughter, Fray Cloud (Fracto and Happy Bottom). He was introduced in Centaur Aisle and appeared in many subsequent books.

=== The Gap Dragon ===
The Gap Dragon or Stanley Steemer is a dragon that lives in the Gap Chasm that runs the width of Xanth. Because the Gap Chasm had a forget spell put on it by Dor in Castle Roogna, nobody could remember it and therefore couldn't remember the dragon, making anyone who entered the Chasm easy prey. In Dragon on a Pedestal, he was de-aged at the fountain of youth, after which he was befriended by three-year-old Princess Ivy. Ivy renamed him Stanley Steemer because the Gap Dragon can only breathe steam, not fire. After an accident with Jordan The Barbarian, Stanley was sent far away. He was later found by Jordan The Barbarian, Threnody, Grundy The Golem, Rapunzel, and Snortimer at a Faun and Nymph lake retreat. The Gap Dragon still today protects the Gap Chasm from intruders, catching prey, and always being a faithful friend to Princess Ivy. He is married to Stella/Stacey Steamer (Princess Ivy named her Stacey but the Xanth lexicon put it down as Stella). They alternate guarding the Gap Chasm and watching their son Steven.

=== Happy Bottom ===
Formerly called Tropical Storm Gladys, Happy Bottom was blown into Xanth from Mundania when the Demon X(A/N)th entered the land of Xanth, stirring out magic dust and causing madness. She was tamed by Fracto later. Their daughter is Fray Cloud.

=== Jenny Elf and Sammy Cat ===
Jenny is named after a fan of the Xanth series who corresponded with Piers Anthony after a severe car accident that left her partially paralyzed. Jenny, who is based on the elves of the ElfQuest series by Wendy and Richard Pini, comes from the world of Two Moons. Her constant companion is her cat Sammy, who can find anything but home. Her friends are Che Centaur and Gwendolyn Goblin. They are introduced in Isle of View. Jenny marries the werewolf Prince Jeremy in Zombie Lover. Sammy Cat, who is named for the Mundanian Jenny's pet cat, has his own adventure as a main character in Up in a Heaval, meeting his own true love Claire Voyant Cat in the process.

=== Justin Tree ===
A man transformed into a tree by Trent for 76 years in the Xanth universe. He rejected offers to be transformed back into a man and seems to like being a tree during that time. His talent is Voice Projection, letting him speak from anywhere without the use of his vocal cords, and he retained this ability even as a tree.

By the time of the novel Zombie Lover, he eventually felt a desire to have an adventure of his own. With his spirit temporarily anchored to Breanna of the Black Wave, he traveled around Xanth with her, and the pair ultimately fell in love. In the process, he and Breanna developed a newfound appreciation for the zombies of Xanth, and he agreed to become the new Zombie Master in place of Jonathan, who was seeking to retire.

Justin was subsequently returned to human form and took youth elixir to restore him to the age of 18, spending the next three years with Breanna and marrying her when he was 21 again (following the events of Swell Foop, during which time he bore the Ring of Idea), then assuming the duties of the Zombie Master full-time. He and Breanna subsequently became the parents of a child named Amber Dawn, who had been delivered by the time of Cube Route.

=== Okra Ogress ===
An ogress born with the talent of a supersonic voice. Having her ogre characteristics diluted by having accidentally gotten a magic talent she isn't as ugly and stupid as a normal ogre. Because of this she wanted to be a main character since nothing bad happens to a main character. She traveled with Mela Merwoman and Ida in The Color of Her Panties in order to ask the Good Magician Humfrey. She marries Smithereen Ogre and has two children with him: Og and Not-Og.

=== Sim ===
Son and heir to Simurgh. He is being tutored by Che Centaur. He has dated Ilene, the second daughter of Trent and Iris. Appears in Roc and a Hard Place and stars in The Dastard, Swell Foop and Air Apparent.

=== Simurgh ===
The wisest of birds and keeper of the seeds of the tree of life. Based on the Simurgh of Persian myth. She is introduced in Dragon on a Pedestal as a leader of the winged animals of Xanth. It is said that she has already survived the destruction and recreation of the universe several times. She married Chex Centaur to Chieron Centaur, and commanded all winged monsters to protect their son Che. Her chick is Sim.

=== Snortimer ===
Snortimer is the monster under Ivy's bed in the land of Xanth. He loves to grab at pretty young ankles. He will fade out of existence when Ivy gets too old to believe in bed monsters. He stayed with the fauns and nymphs in place of Stanley Steamer (the Gap Dragon).

=== Volney Vole ===
The mate of Wilda Wiggle, Volney was a main character in Vale of the Vole. Volney replaces his S's with V's in speech; however, to his ears, S's from others sound like hissing.

=== Fray Cloud ===
Daughter of Fracto and Happy Bottom.
