= Ogre, Ogre =

1982 fantasy novel by Piers Anthony

- First edition, featuring the character Smash
- Author: Piers Anthony
- Cover artist: Darrell K. Sweet
- Language: English
- Series: Xanth series
- Genre: Fantasy
- Publisher: Del Rey Books
- Publication date: October 1982
- Publication place: United States
- Media type: Print (Paperback)
- Pages: 307 (paperback 18th printing)
- ISBN: 0-345-35492-3
- OCLC: 8389131
- Preceded by: Centaur Aisle
- Followed by: Night Mare

Ogre, Ogre is the fifth book of the Xanth series written by British-American author Piers Anthony, and is possibly the first fantasy paperback to make it onto the New York Times Bestseller List.

== Plot introduction ==
Smash the half-ogre (offspring of Crunch the ogre and a human Curse Fiend acting like an ogre) goes to see the Good Magician Humfrey to get his question answered, although he doesn't know what his question is. The magician's answer: Travel to the Ancestral Ogres to find what you seek. His payment is to guard Tandy, a half-nymph, for one year.

They travel about the magical land of Xanth, and Smash acquires other young women who travel with him and whom he protects. Along the way, he is infected with the Eye Queue vine, which makes him intelligent (although actually invoking his human half) making him distressed, since ogres are not supposed to be smart in any way. As he tries to find an antidote to his intelligence, he undergoes several adventures; saving Tandy from the dream realm in a plant called a hypnogourd and smashing the Gap Dragon. Soon he finds matches and finds solutions for all of the women, who leave one by one.

== Publication history ==
Piers Anthony's first novel set in Xanth, A Spell for Chameleon, was published by Ballantine Books/Del Rey Books in 1977. The book proved popular, and the sequel, The Source of Magic was released in 1979, followed by Castle Roogna (1979), Centaur Aisle (1981), and Ogre, Ogre, published by Del Rey Books in 1982. Ogre, Ogre is believed to be the first fantasy paperback to make it onto the New York Times Bestseller List.

As of 2025, Anthony has written 48 books in the Xanth series.

== Reception ==
In Issue 22 of Abyss, Dave Nalle called this "a well and carefully crafted book. It reads quickly, is never boring, and has all the features needed to make a story good." However, Nalle noted "an air of conscious crafting without inspiration or innovation. This is the same stuff, variations on the old themes of Xanth, without the brilliant original ideas which characterize A Spell for Chameleon or The Source of Magic. [It] is an exercise in conscious and calculated mediocrity." Nalle concluded "There are worse ways to spend an evening than reading Ogre, Ogre, but there are many better and more ambitious books available, and if you haven't read any Anthony, I'd urge an earlier work like those mentioned earlier."

== Reviews ==
- Review by Patricia Hernlund (1982) in Science Fiction & Fantasy Book Review #10, December 1982
- Review by Roger C. Schlobin (1983) in Fantasy Newsletter #55, January 1983
