= Apprentice Adept =

Novel series by Piers Anthony

Apprentice Adept is a heptalogy of fantasy and science fiction novels written by English American author Piers Anthony. The series takes place on Phaze and Proton, two worlds occupying the same space in two different dimensional planes. Phaze is a lush planet of magic, where Proton is a barren mining planet of science. As the series opens, each person born on Phaze and Proton has an alternate self living on the other world. But if a person on either world lacks a duplicate (for instance if a Proton citizen immigrated there from another planet, or a counterpart from the opposite frame died), he can cross to the other through an energy "curtain" that circumscribes each frame.

The first three books in the series follow Proton serf Stile as he enters Phaze and becomes an important political force there. The next three concern the adventures of Mach (Citizen Blue's son), Bane (Stile's son), and Bane's companions. Finally, volume 7, Phaze Doubt follows Bane's and Mach's nine-year-old children, Flach and Nepe, among others.

== Setting ==
=== Proton ===
In the series, Proton is only one planet in a galaxy of human-inhabited worlds. Most of the atmosphere of the planet has been destroyed through the mining of Protonite, a valuable energy source, and the inhabitants of Proton live in domed cities with artificial life support.

Despite its advanced science, Proton's socioeconomic scheme somewhat resembles the medieval period. The planet is run by fabulously wealthy Citizens but the bulk of the inhabitants are serfs. Serfs must be employed by a Citizen and remain naked at all times unless ordered otherwise by a Citizen. A Citizen has complete authority over his serfs and may order them to do anything he desires. The weakest among them have wealth to rival medieval kings. Serfs, however, are not slaves; the serfs of Proton have all chosen serfdom as their occupation (or are descended from those who have). After twenty years of work, a serf earns a gram of Protonite, and his retirement. While a paltry sum on Proton itself, this is enough to make the former serf comfortably wealthy elsewhere in the galaxy. Even then many serfs would choose to stay on Proton after their twenty years are up, but it is not permitted in most circumstances. The exception to this rule is getting far enough in the tourney (see below).

In addition to the Citizens and serfs, Proton is home to advanced robots, some of which are self-aware and possess their own free will. As the series opens it is not common knowledge that some robots are self-willed. Humanity has also made contact with alien species, some members of which make their homes on Proton as well.

=== The Game ===
The main pastime of Proton inhabitants is The Game. When two persons want to play a round, they proceed to a Game console. There, one player chooses one of four categories: 1. PHYSICAL, 2. MENTAL, 3. CHANCE, or 4. ARTS. The other player chooses among A. NAKED, B. TOOL, C. MACHINE, or D. ANIMAL. (In this context, naked does not necessarily mean unclothed but rather unassisted by external tools.) Once the grid is completed, players continue on subgrids until they select a particular game to play. For instance, in the books, Stile plays a Naked/Arts round in interpretive dance, while later on the same category produces extemporaneous poetry. Chance/Tool covers board and card games, among others. Most sports are under Physical, but so is Tiddlywinks. Due to the wide variety of contests available, any given round could take any one of thousands of forms.

In choosing categories for the Game and then particular contests once the main category is selected, the intelligent player uses his knowledge of his opponent, trying to play to the opponent's weaknesses and his own strengths. Of course, his ability to do so is limited because half the grid is in the opponent's hands.

Every year, the top-ranked players are entered into a Tourney. The final winner of the Tourney is immediately made a Citizen and given a small percentage of the annual Protonite production equal to about one kilogram at the moment of Citizenship. (Assuming, of course, that the winner is not a Citizen already.) Other Tourney participants who last until the final rounds are rewarded by being allowed to stay a serf on Proton for an additional term of years.

Not only do Citizens participate in the Game, they also wager vast sums amongst themselves in any conceivable fashion. However, should a Citizen lose so many wagers that he is unable to pay his debts with his proceeds from the Protonite mines, he is prevented from wagering further until once again solvent.

=== Phaze ===
In contrast to Proton, Phaze is a lush and verdant world. Besides humans, it is also populated by several species common to the fantasy genre such as unicorns, werewolves, vampires, trolls, and animalheads—humans with beast-heads like the Minotaur or Anubis. As in classic fantasy fiction, magic is a daily part of life in Phaze. It is powered by Phazite, the same substance as Protonite on the other side of the curtain.

Just as magic does not work in Proton, advanced technology does not operate in Phaze. For instance, when one of Proton's self-willed robots crossed the curtain into Phaze, she became inert until returned to her home dimension. Later, the same robot was magically made into a golem, allowing her to operate in both worlds, using electrical power in Proton, and magical power in Phaze.

Most humans in Phaze are able to do some minor magic but are not magicians by trade. The exceptions are the Adepts, extremely powerful wizards, each with his or her own special mode of magic use. Most of the Adepts in Phaze are named after colors; for instance, the Brown Adept makes and animates golems while the White Adept performs magic by drawing sigils in the ground. Not only are Adepts able to achieve almost anything through their magic, only they are powerful enough to magically affect resistant creatures such as unicorns and animalheads. As a rule, Adepts cannot harm or otherwise affect another Adept through magic for very long; however, a group of them working in concert can usually overpower a lone Adept. Each spell an Adept uses can only be worked once by that Adept, though countless variations can be created. Humans are different from other species because they do not have the capability to do magic on their own and require phazite.

Unicorns in the Apprentice Adept series are somewhat different from those traditionally described in fantasy. First, Phaze's unicorns are as intelligent as humans. Also, they are not colored in blacks and greys like horses but rather in more dramatic colors. For instance, one unicorn character, Clip, is a blue stallion with red "socks," that is, ankles. In addition to their coloring, unicorns with socks can actually remove them. If humans don them, the socks cast the illusion that the human is in fact a unicorn of the sock color. Furthermore, unicorns in Phaze are shapeshifters; most can learn two other forms. If a unicorn learns to shift into a hawk, he can fly in that form; if a human, he can speak. Finally, unicorns in the series have hollow horns which they use as musical instruments. Each unicorn character described in the books has a distinct instrument. For instance, Clip's horn sounds like a saxophone, while his sister Neysa's horn makes harmonica sounds.

One final, important feature of Phaze is the Oracle. Although the actual Oracle is hidden from sight for reasons explained later in the series, it is accessible through a speaking tube. The Oracle will answer any querent a single question. But like the original Oracle at Delphi, the pronouncements of Phaze's Oracle are usually cryptic and self-fulfilling. The Oracle is actually a computer with its source line running through the west pole so it can have power in Phaze.

== Adepts ==
As referenced before, most of the adepts in Phaze are named after colors and each has a unique mode of magic.

The Adepts and their powers:

- Blue Adept: Blue uses music and rhymes. More specifically, music summons his magic and words define it.
- Yellow Adept: Yellow uses potions.
- Red Adept: Red stores magic in amulets that must then be invoked. Trool the Troll was made Red adept by use of the book of magic.
- White Adept: White draws sigils. The surface doesn't matter.
- Black Adept: Black's power is a line of seeming unlimited length that can be used to create physical objects such as a castle or a dragon.
- Green Adept: Green's magic is invoked through hand gestures.
- Orange Adept: Orange has power over all plant life.
- Purple Adept: Purple's magic involves geological manipulation (e.g., creating tunnels or earthquakes).
- Brown Adept: Brown has the power to make and animate golems.
- Translucent Adept: Translucent has mysterious powers over water and aquatic creatures.
- Tan Adept: Tan's power is called "The Evil Eye." Tan can use this power to slice, stun, mesmerize, or presumably kill.
- Clef: Clef never had a color. He was the one chosen, for his natural skills with musical instruments, to play the "platinum flute" to juxtapose the frames of Phaze and Proton. His only ability to manifest magic actually lies within the flute itself. He was not actually considered an "Adept," because his powers are not inherent. But his ability to wield the flute's powers gave him Adept-like magnitude during his brief tenure in Phaze.
- Robot Adept: This title officially belongs to Mach, the son of Citizen Blue and Sheen. He used the Book of Magic to become an instant Adept. However, in Juxtaposition, Sheen is also referred to as the Robot Adept. She also had to use the Book of Magic and as a result became Adept.
- Unicorn Adept: This is the son of Mach and Fleta, Flach. He has the power of the blue adept and the power to shape shift like a unicorn.
- Hectare Adept: An alien named Weva. She is part wolf, bat, and human. Her Proton aspect, Beman, is part Hectare(BEM), robot, and human. He/she was born under the West Pole of Phaze, and trained by the Animal-heads that lived there. There is an assumption, although it is never stated, that she was trained from the Book of Magic and therefore isn't limited in her mode of magic.

Note: Due to the use of the Book of Magic, which contains all forms of Adept magic, Robot and Unicorn and Red Adept 2 are not limited in the method in which they invoke their magic.

== Series synopsis ==
=== Split Infinity (1980) ===
The Game-champion serf Stile is assaulted on Proton by an unknown enemy, but learns he can escape into a mysterious fantasy world (Phaze). In Phaze he meets Neysa, a unicorn, and learns of his magical legacy as the Blue Adept. Back in Proton he tries to uncover his enemy, while building a relationship with his robot lover, Sheen.

=== Blue Adept (1981) ===
Stile has gained significant power in Phaze as the Blue adept, whose songs and poems hold incredible power. However, on Proton he faces deportation and enters the tournament in the hope of gaining citizenship. His adversary is revealed to be the amulet-making Red Adept, who exists in Proton as a serf in the Tourney. Stile defeats her in combat in Phaze and in the Tourney on Proton, leading to her expulsion from both worlds.

=== Juxtaposition (1982) ===
Years of mining for the high-energy mineral "Protonite" has left an imbalance between Proton and its sister world, Phaze. To restore the balance, Citizen/Adept Stile must juxtapose the frames and transfer "Phazeite" from Phaze to Proton, or the two worlds will both be destroyed. However, he faces resistance from the Contrary Citizens and Adverse Adepts who stand to lose considerable power if he is successful.

=== Out of Phaze (1987) ===
Out of Phaze is about the early adventures of Mach and Bane. Mach is the robotic son of the original Blue Adept/Sheen from Proton and Bane the son of Stile/Lady Blue from Phaze. The two discover that they have the ability to switch frames, but have difficulty switching back. Both fall in love with people from the other frame: Mach with Fleta, the daughter of Neysa the unicorn, and Bane with Agape, an amorphous alien.

=== Robot Adept (1988) ===
Conflict arises between Mach and Bane due to their individual honors. Mach allies himself with the Adverse Adepts/Contrary Citizens due to the denial of his "forbidden relationship" with Fleta in Out of Phaze. Mach learns magic from the book of magic to become the robot adept. In the end, Mach and Bane have a contest across the frames, and Mach wins, putting both Mach and Bane on the side of the Adverse Adepts/Contrary Citizens.

=== Unicorn Point (1989) ===
This book chronicles the adventures of the children of Mach/Fleta (Flach) and Bane/Agape (Nepe). Each has powers derived from both their parents.

=== Phaze Doubt (1990) ===
The bug-eyed monsters (BEMs) attempt to take over Phaze. Lysander, an alien mind in a human body, is sent to infiltrate the Phaze/Proton resistance but finds that a prophecy makes him the key player in the planet's defence, though his loyalty remains with the BEMs. The realm of Phaze is also briefly visited in Piers Anthony's twenty-seventh Xanth book, Cube Route.
