= Dragon on a Pedestal =

1983 novel by Piers Anthony

- First edition
- Author: Piers Anthony
- Cover artist: Darrell K. Sweet
- Language: English
- Genre: Fantasy
- Publisher: Del Rey Books
- Publication date: October 1983
- Publication place: United States
- Media type: Print (Paperback)
- Pages: 304 (paperback 9th printing)
- ISBN: 0-345-34936-9
- OCLC: 27954021
- Preceded by: Night Mare
- Followed by: Crewel Lye: A Caustic Yarn

Dragon on a Pedestal is a fantasy novel by American writer Piers Anthony, the seventh book of the Xanth series .

This book centers on Princess Ivy, the 3-year-old daughter of King Dor and Queen Irene, the search for her, and the spell on Gap Chasm that caused people to forget it existed breaking apart into "Forget Whorls".

== Plot summary ==
When the book begins, the Good Magician Humfrey, and his son Hugo, run into the Gap dragon while filling a vial with water from the Fountain of Youth. Humpfrey tells Hugo to douse the dragon with the water, and Hugo does so but accidentally sprays Humpfrey as well. Humpfrey regresses to the age of a baby, as does the dragon. Queen Irene realizes Princess Ivy has wandered off, and begins a quest to find her daughter. Luckily, Ivy comes across Humfrey's 8-year-old son Hugo, and – due to her unknown talent of enhancement – Hugo temporarily becomes smarter, braver, and stronger when she tells him he is. Ivy also manages to enhance the positive qualities of the Gap Dragon, and names him Stanley Steamer.

In Castle Roogna, Dor accidentally put a forget spell on the Gap Chasm (the huge rift that splits Xanth in two), while trying to escape a horde of harpies and goblins, with the result being that everyone forgot the Gap Chasm existed, with the exception of the people who live near it. In this book, the forget spell is beginning to disintegrate into "forget whorls" spinning off into the nearby forest (due to the Time Of No Magic caused when Bink released the Demon X(A/N)th), causing confusion and memory loss. Ivy ends up walking through a forget whirl and it causes her to forget how to get home.

Near the end of the novel, all the characters join forces against a swarm of wiggles, which threaten the welfare of Xanth by burrowing through anything and everything in their path.

== Characters ==
- Ivy
- Hugo
- Irene
- Gorgon
- The Gap Dragon
- Humfrey
- Dor

== Reception ==
Dave Langford reviewed Dragon on a Pedestal for White Dwarf #52, and stated that "Despite a predilection for very didactic explanations and very stupid protagonists, Anthony is engagingly breezy and inventive, titivating each tired old quest plot with new varieties of 'magic'."

== Reviews ==
- Review [French] by Élisabeth Vonarburg? (1984) in Solaris, #54
- Review by Richard Mathews (1984) in SF & Fantasy Review, March 1984
