= Night Mare =

1983 fantasy novel by Piers Anthony

- First edition
- Author: Piers Anthony
- Cover artist: Darrell K. Sweet
- Language: English
- Genre: Fantasy
- Publisher: Del Rey Books
- Publication date: January 1983
- Publication place: United States
- Media type: Print (Paperback)
- Pages: 307 (paperback 16th printing)
- ISBN: 0-345-35493-1
- OCLC: 27954038
- Preceded by: Ogre, Ogre
- Followed by: Dragon on a Pedestal

Night Mare is a fantasy novel by American writer Piers Anthony, the sixth book of the Xanth series . In the book, Xanth is under threat of a barbarian invasion from Mundania. Its only hope is the talents of the Magicians of Xanth and an exiled night mare, sent to the world of waking with the dire message: "Beware the Horseman."

== Plot ==
Night Mare centres around Mare Imbrium, one of the night mares charged with delivering bad dreams to the people of Xanth. Imbri carries half a soul, her fee for carrying Chem Centaur out of the void in the previous book. She is unwilling to relinquish her soul, though the conscience that comes with it impedes her ability to deliver bad dreams. The Night Stallion, ruler of the gourd realm, makes Imbri the liaison to the day world and sends her to meet Trent, King of Xanth, with the message, "Beware the Horseman".

Imbri leaves the gourd realm and sets out for Castle Roogna with her warning. Along the way she meets a white stallion, which she calls the day horse, with a brass bracelet around one leg, who is scared by her attempt at contact via a brief daydream, and runs away. She also meets an intelligent man wearing a brass bracelet, similar to that of the day horse. He asks her if she has seen the horse and convinces her to allow him to ride her so they can track it. She allows him to insert a bit into her mouth, but dislikes it and asks him to remove it. He refuses and uses spurs on her, capturing her.

Imbri asks the man who he is, and he says "I am the Horseman". He then corrals her at his camp and builds a large bonfire to shine light on her and prevent her from turning intangible during the night. As the Horseman and his henchmen sleep, the day horse approaches. She tells him of her plight, and he affirms that he is terrified of the Horseman, but assists her anyway by urinating on the fire and enabling her to escape.

Imbri makes her way to Castle Roogna. She arrives in time to witness the elopement of Prince Dor and King Trent's daughter, Princess Irene. Upon becoming acquainted with Chameleon, the wife of Bink and mother of Prince Dor, she is led to find King Trent, only to discover that he has been ensorcelled, staring blankly into space. Prince Dor, next in line to the crown and newly wed to Princess Irene, assumes the throne. He informs Imbri and others that the Nextwave Invasion is occurring; an army of barbarians from the neighbouring, non-magical land of Mundania has just entered Xanth.

King Dor orders Imbri and Chameleon to seek advice from the Good Magician Humphrey. Imbri and Chameleon travel to Humphrey's castle and navigate through the standard three challenges, gaining access to the inside. The old man casually repeats the Night Stallion's warning, "Beware the Horseman" and adds another cryptic instruction: "Break the chain."

After battling the Mundanes with King Trent's army from A Spell For Chameleon, Dor falls to the same ensorcellement as King Trent. Since the law of Xanth requires that a Magician sit on the throne, the Zombie Master (Jonathon) becomes the new king. Jonathan's magic talent is to reanimate the deceased, and he rallies his zombies to form an army to fight the Punic invasion from Mundania, but falls to the same bewitchment as Trent and Dor.

Humphrey assumes the throne, and prepares himself for battle against the Punic horde and its leader Hasbinbad. He informs Imbri, much to the chagrin of the Gorgon, that he is not destined to be the saviour of Xanth, and that he expects to make a tragic mistake in battle. Before departing to the battle, Humphrey identifies his successor: Dor's father Bink, whom everybody assumed had no magic talent. Humphrey reveals to Queen Iris that Bink's talent is immunity from magical harm. It is hoped Bink will be immune from the effects of the Horseman's spell. Imbri is sent north to the border of Mundania, where Bink and the centaur scholar Arnolde are traveling. Imbri brings news to Bink and Arnolde of the invasion, and informs Bink of the situation. Bink agrees to return with Imbri and instructs Arnolde to follow, as he is next in the line of succession.

Bink and Imbri travel to the baobab tree and find Humphrey, taken by the power of the enemy. He has a bottle in his hand, and when Bink uncorks it, Humphrey's voice emits from it, with one word: "Horseman". Bink surmises that Humphrey's voice was identifying his assailant, and that they now know who was ensorcelling the kings. Bink and Imbri prepare for battle alone, armed with Humphrey's numerous spells and potions. They set aside a box marked "Pandora". He and Imbri are victorious but are separated in the battle. When Imbri tracks down Bink, she finds that he has killed the Punic leader Hasbinbad, but has been taken with the Horseman's power nonetheless. Imbri returns to Castle Roogna to inform Arnolde the Centaur that he is now King of Xanth.

Arnolde begins laying plans for his successor, and he interprets Xanthian law to his advantage. The law states that the king must be a Magician but had no precedence on whether the king had to be human or what sex. Arnolde states that a Sorceress is simply a female Magician, and that the law does not prohibit a woman from becoming king. He selects Queen Iris to be his successor, and he proclaims her daughter Irene to be a full Sorceress, thus establishing who would be the seventh and eights kings after him. Arnolde then instructs Imbri to report to the Night Stallion with an update.

King Arnolde, realising that the previous kings' condition is similar to that of a person trapped by the hypnogourd, sends Imbri through to the Night Stallion's dimension to see if the missing Kings are within. Upon arrival, Imbri is amazed to learn that all five of the bewitched kings are present in the gourd. They surmise that the Horseman's magic talent is to connect a person's line of sight to another object, and that he has used this ability to make them all see into a hypnogourd, trapping their souls inside.

Imbri brings this news to Castle Roogna, and eventually brings Princess Irene to the gourd to visit her new husband Dor, taken from her after their nuptials. Shortly after the pair return to Castle Roogna, Arnolde is taken by the Horseman, and Queen Iris becomes King Iris, the first female king.

Iris uses her talent of illusion to inflict massive casualties on the Punic horde, who are now marching on Castle Roogna under the command of the Horseman. She briefly forms an image of her own face in front of the Horseman to mock him, whereupon he simply uses his talent to ensorcell her. Princess Irene becomes king of Xanth next, and she identifies Chameleon as the next king, stating that, although Chameleon does not have Magician-Caliber talent, she would be the best option for king because she is in her ugly, but extremely intelligent phase.

The Horseman expends nearly the rest of his forces in reaching Castle Roogna. Chameleon, realising that the Day Horse and the Horseman are one and the same, lures him into the castle, and once he is inside, Irene uses her talent of accelerated plant growth to wrap the castle in a tight cocoon of plants, trapping him inside. Enraged, he uses his magic to ensnare her, whereupon Chameleon becomes king of Xanth and informs him that he will fail. He takes Chameleon with his power, too, and Xanth is left without a king.

Imbri returns to Castle Roogna, having been previously named the Tenth King by Chameleon, because she is a creature of the Gourd, and can not enter the world via the peep hole, and therefore can not be forced into it.

Imbri enters Roogna at night, so she is able to slip by the plants, and confronts the Horseman. He is now sitting on the throne, having proclaimed himself the new king of Xanth. As Imbri approaches, he shifts into his alternate form, and Imbri is stricken; she is in season, and he is a male horse. She is unable to act under his dominating power, but when the barbarians break into the castle and call out for their leader, he shifts back to his human form to answer. Imbri attacks and kills him, but the nine catatonic kings do not revive.

Imbri realizes that the Horseman's magic talent was shape-shifting, and that the bands he wore around his wrists were magical bands that allowed him to perform his ensorcellment. Devastated, and with nothing to lose, she destroys the box marked PANDORA, and is surrounded by a pink smoke, and feels suddenly hopeful. She removes the band but does not destroy it, because that might not accomplish the goal of releasing the kings. She decides to travel to the Void, an area in the Elemental region of Xanth, from which nothing can escape and will hopefully nullify the band's powers. She takes the band there and throws it in, but is trapped by the gravitational pull of the Void. Terrified, her physical body is destroyed by the Void.

The nine kings revive as the magical band is nullified, and Imbri returns as a day mare, thanks to Humfrey, and is now charged with bringing pleasant daydreams instead of nightmares to the people of Xanth. King Trent and Queen Iris retire, leaving the throne to their new son-in-law, King Dor.

== Characters ==
- Imbri
- Chameleon
- Humfrey
- Nextwave Kings
