= Up in a Heaval =

2002 fantasy novel by Piers Anthony

Up In A Heaval
- First edition
- Author: Piers Anthony
- Cover artist: Darrell K. Sweet; Carol Russo Design
- Language: English
- Genre: Fantasy
- Publisher: Tor Books
- Publication date: October 2002
- Publication place: United States
- Media type: Print (Hardcover and Paperback)
- Pages: 339 pp (hardcover 1st ed.)
- ISBN: 0-312-86904-5
- OCLC: 49679483
- Dewey Decimal: 813/.54 21
- LC Class: PS3551.N73 U6 2002
- Preceded by: Swell Foop
- Followed by: Cube Route

Up In A Heaval is a fantasy novel by British-American writer Piers Anthony, the twenty-sixth book of the Xanth series.

== Characters ==
- Umlaut
- Sesame
- Magician Humfrey
- Demoness Metria
- Sammy Cat
- The Demon Jupiter
