= Stork Naked =

2006 novel by Piers Anthony

- First edition
- Author: Piers Anthony
- Cover artist: Darrell K. Sweet; Carol Russo Design
- Language: English
- Genre: Fantasy
- Publisher: Tor Books
- Publication date: 2006
- Publication place: United States
- Media type: Print (Hardcover and Paperback)
- ISBN: 978-0-7653-4312-3
- Preceded by: Pet Peeve
- Followed by: Air Apparent

Stork Naked is a fantasy novel by British-American writer Piers Anthony, the thirtieth book of the Xanth series.

== Plot ==
Surprise summons the stork with Umlaut, only to discover with dismay that the stork refuses to deliver her baby due to a clerical error. Off on an adventure to find her child, she seeks the aid of Pyra, who wields a tool that can find, and enter, alternate realities. As Surprise and her entourage search for the correct world, the sinister mechanism behind the whole adventure is revealed.

== Characters ==
- Surprise Golem, daughter of Grundy Golem and Rapunzel Elf
- Che Centaur, winged Centaur, tutor
- Pet Peeve, an insulting bird
- Half-Demon Ted
- Half-Demon Monica
- Woe Betide, the child aspect of the Demoness Metria
- Pyra
