= Air Apparent =

2007 novel by Piers Anthony

- First edition cover
- Author: Piers Anthony
- Cover artist: Darrell K. Sweet; Carol Russo Design
- Language: English
- Genre: Fantasy novel
- Publisher: TOR Books
- Publication date: October 16, 2007
- Publication place: United States
- Media type: Print (hardback & paperback)
- Pages: 316
- ISBN: 978-0-7653-0410-0
- OCLC: 124075006
- Dewey Decimal: 813/.54 22
- LC Class: PS3551.N73 A75 2007
- Preceded by: Stork Naked
- Followed by: Two to the Fifth

Air Apparent is the thirty-first book of the Xanth series by Piers Anthony, which was first mentioned in the "Author's Note" in Currant Events. Piers Anthony stated that notions from his readers have already been set aside for use in this installment in the same "Author's Note."

== Plot introduction ==
Piers Anthony has stated that the book is set as a murder mystery. It has, typical for Xanth books, many puns. Readers also get a better understanding of the nature of Ida's moons. Air Apparent includes a character known as a Debra who is a 13-year-old girl who is constantly pressured to take off her bra. To De-Bra so to speak. She is based on a real girl. Debra Kawaguchi was a huge fan of the Xanth series and after her death in 2004, her father wrote Piers and asked him to include Debra in his cast of characters. After Piers explained to Debra's father that the only way he could think to include Debra in the book was through the De-Bra-ing pun, Mr. Kawaguchi agreed that Debra would have been delighted to be a character in Xanth and would have loved the pun. Piers mentions Mr. Kawaguchi in the author notes as the inspiration for Debra. Debra is depicted on the front cover of the hardback book as a flying centaur.

== Review ==
"The Xanth books constitute Anthony's longest and most successful series . . . . They are intended to be kind-spirited, fun reading, a series of wondrous beasts and beings, and most of all, an endless succession of outrageous puns"—Lee Killough, Wichita Eagle
