= The Dastard =

2000 novel by Piers Anthony

- Author: Piers Anthony
- Cover artist: Darrell K. Sweet; Carol Russo Design
- Language: English
- Genre: Fantasy
- Publisher: Tor Books
- Publication date: October 2000
- Publication place: United States
- Media type: Print (Hardcover and Paperback)
- Pages: 296 (hardcover 1st ed.)
- ISBN: 0-8125-7473-7
- OCLC: 48125041
- Preceded by: Xone of Contention
- Followed by: Swell Foop

The Dastard is a fantasy novel by British-American writer Piers Anthony, the twenty-fourth book of the Xanth series.

In the book, the Dastard is a vile, loathsome man with the power to travel back in time. He uses this to neutralize people's joyous moments and if this includes removing the existence of sentient beings, so be it. Despite this selfish, amoral attitude, the Dastard finds himself involved with a cross-Xanth adventure anyway, with a woman resistant to his methods. He runs up against the Sea Hag, who is just as evil and powerful.

== Plot summary ==
Becka was a crossbreed - the daughter of Draco Dragon and a lovely human woman who met, by chance, at a Love Spring. Now fourteen, Becka was beginning to wonder where in Xanth she belonged, on the ground with her mother's people or flying the skies with her father's kind. So she journeyed to the Good Magician Humfrey to discover her true purpose in life. Much to her astonishment and surprise, the Magician told her that a great Destiny awaited her, one that would affect the future of all of Xanth.

To unravel the mystery of her Fate, Becka did as Humfrey bade her: traveling on foot to the statue of the dreaded Sea Hag to meet the man who would be waiting for her there, and offering him her assistance. But to her dismay, Becka discovered that the one who awaited her there was a dangerous, despicable libertine who called himself the Dastard.

Once a common country boy, the Dastard had sold his soul to a detestable demon in exchange for the power to erase events and rewrite history to suit his own devious ends. Lacking a conscience and filled with craven self-loathing, he roamed the width and breadth of Xanth in search of anyone happier than he was. Once he found them, he used his malevolent talent to "unhappen" their happiness so that others could share in his misery.

Determined to honor her vow but despairing of her ability to help this man and still preserve her virtue, Becka set out on a wide and perilous journey that led from the mists of Xanth's distant past to the tiny planetoid of Ptero, where everyone in Xanth who might have been actually existed. There she discovered a magic that was far stronger than the Dastard's: the awesome power of the human heart.

== Characters ==
- The Dastard – An evil man, only concerned with his base, animalistic desires. Once a man named Anomy, with the talent of Stupid Ideas, he traded his soul to a demon for the talent of Unhappening events. However, he can only unhappen up to the time he received this talent, and cannot unhappen his own unhappenings (i.e., if he meets a girl and unhappens part of their conversation, he can't unhappen meeting that girl, because that would be paradox).
- The Sea Hag – an evil woman, corrupted over the years of her life, with the ability to take over the body of anybody she chooses when the body she possessed dies.
- Becka – Daughter of Draco Dragon and a human woman who met at a love spring, she can change into any of her three forms (dragon, half-dragon, human). She is sent to the Dastard by the Good Magician in order to help deal with him, and given Awareness, so she can remember the Dastard's Unhappenings.
