= Golem in the Gears =

Novel by Piers Anthony

- First edition
- Author: Piers Anthony
- Cover artist: Darrell K. Sweet
- Language: English
- Genre: Fantasy
- Publisher: Del Rey Books
- Publication date: February 1986
- Publication place: United States
- Media type: Print (Paperback)
- Pages: 279 (paperback 7th printing)
- ISBN: 0-345-31886-2
- OCLC: 27954053
- Preceded by: Crewel Lye: A Caustic Yarn
- Followed by: Vale of the Vole

Golem in the Gears is a fantasy novel by American writer Piers Anthony, the ninth book of the Xanth series.

== Plot introduction ==
Grundy, a man only a few inches high, is desperate to prove himself and gain respect. He volunteers to ride the Monster Under The Bed to find his friend Ivy's long lost dragon, Stanley Steamer.

After many adventures, he rescues Rapunzel from the villainous Sea Hag. It seems too good to be true that she could become any size she wanted! A perfect match, seemingly. But that would have to wait until they shook off the pursuing Sea Hag...and Stanley still needed to be found!

== Characters ==
- Grundy
- Rapunzel
- Sea Hag
- Snortimer

== Reception ==
Dave Langford reviewed Golem in the Gears for White Dwarf #86, and stated that "Like some legendary D&D campaigns, Xanth is so full of whimsy and casual magic that no situation can threaten for long: the storyline lurches drunkenly from pun to banal pun."

== Reviews ==
- Review by Bob Collins (1985) in Fantasy Review, December 1985
- Review by Don D'Ammassa (1986) in Science Fiction Chronicle, #82 July 1986
- Review by Andy Sawyer (1987) in Paperback Inferno, #64
- Review by Ken Brown (1987) in Interzone, #20 Summer 1987
