= Pet Peeve =

Pet Peeve may refer to:

- Pet peeve, a minor annoyance that can instill great frustration in an individual
- Pet Peeve (film), a 1954 Tom and Jerry cartoon
- Pet Peeve (novel), the twenty-ninth book of the Xanth series
