= Crewel Lye: A Caustic Yarn =

1984 novel by Piers Anthony

- First edition
- Author: Piers Anthony
- Cover artist: Darrell K. Sweet
- Language: English
- Series: Xanth series
- Genre: Fantasy
- Publisher: Del Rey Books
- Publication date: December 12th 1984 (first edition) / January 1985 (Mass publication)
- Publication place: United States
- Media type: Print (Paperback)
- Pages: 303 (paperback 9th printing)
- ISBN: 0-345-34599-1
- OCLC: 27954032
- Preceded by: Dragon on a Pedestal
- Followed by: Golem in the Gears

Crewel Lye: A Caustic Yarn is a fantasy novel by American writer Piers Anthony, the eighth book of the Xanth series.

This book is a story within a story as one of Castle Roogna's ghosts, Jordan the Barbarian, tells Princess Ivy his story of betrayal and death via the magical medium of the Tapestry.

== Plot ==
The five-year-old Princess Ivy asks one of Castle Roogna's ghosts to tell her how he became a ghost. Ivy uses her talent of enhancement - and some caustic Crewel Lye to strip off centuries of accrued grime - to improve the range and clarity of Castle Roogna's magical Tapestry. The Tapestry is a woven hanging which allows anyone to view recent or historical events (although it cannot violate the Adult Conspiracy, nor does it include sound). The ghost, known as Jordan the Barbarian when he was alive 400 years ago, begins his story by recounting how he set off on an adventure with his horse Pook.

Jordan had the magical talent of self-healing — which came in handy as he was cut, stabbed, and dismembered during his travels. In one case, a woman finds him gravely injured and hauls him to her cottage, not knowing of his talent. Jordan ends up falling in love with this woman, Threnody. Unfortunately, the evil magician Yin-Yang had already claimed Threnody to be his wife, and was willing to do anything to have her.

Intending to keep Jordan safe from Yin-Yang, Threnody makes it appear that she has betrayed Jordan. She cuts him into pieces and buries each piece in a different remote location — knowing that if the pieces were reattached, he would be able to heal himself. However, she is never able to break free of Yin-Yang long enough to collect Jordan's dismembered body and eventually kills herself.

After hearing Jordan's story, Ivy decides to gather his body parts herself. Once placed near each other, the pieces mend together and cover back up with muscle and skin (greatly sped up due to Ivy's enhancement). Jordan is alive again — but he wants his new love, the ghost Renee, to be brought to life again too. When Ivy and Jordan use a regenerating potion on Renee's remains (after accidentally teleporting Stanley Steamer the baby Gap Dragon away), Threnody emerges from her grave.

Threnody explains that her "cruel lie" had been done to protect Jordan. After some time, he forgives her and they get married.

== Characters ==
- Jordan
- Threnody
- Pook Pooka
- Yin-Yang
- Ivy
