= Demons Don't Dream =

1993 fantasy novel by Piers Anthony

- First edition
- Author: Piers Anthony
- Cover artist: Darrell K. Sweet; Carol Russo Design
- Language: English
- Genre: Fantasy
- Publisher: Tor Books
- Publication date: February 1993
- Publication place: United States
- Media type: Print (Hardcover and Paperback)
- Pages: 304 (hardcover 1st ed.)
- ISBN: 0-8125-3483-2
- OCLC: 29733003
- Preceded by: The Color of Her Panties
- Followed by: Harpy Thyme

Demons Don't Dream is a fantasy novel by American writer Piers Anthony published in 1993, the sixteenth book in the Xanth series.

The Companions of Xanth computer game was marketed in a box set along with the novel. The game and novel share a storyline in which Kim and Dug, two Mundane teenagers, play a mysterious computer game that magically transports them to the realm of Xanth to compete for a one-of-a-kind prize: a magical talent. In the actual computer game, the player assumes the role of Dug.

== Plot summary ==
Dug, a Mundane, is transported in to the magic land of Xanth when he plays a computer game introduced to him by his friend for a bet. The game consists of the player having a companion, who is usually a well known Xanth character, and being led through the magical world of Xanth, defeating challenges along the way and eventually winning the ultimate prize of a magic talent. The catch with the companions is that there is a chance that your companion is false, meaning that at the point where you might finally win, the companion will cause your ultimate downfall. The game also has a way of becoming 3D to the player, and, if the player believes in magic, eventually real.

Dug, being a mundane boy of sixteen, picks Nada Naga as his partner, because of her beauty. Nada Naga begins to lead Dug in the world of Xanth, at first trying to convince him that the magical world is real, but giving up after realizing that Dug stubbornly refuses to believe in magic. Dug travels to the Isthmus village, where he learns the town is being controlled under a horrible censorship. He sets out to destroy the ship. After defeating the censorship, he is kicked out of the game twice, once only temporarily from trying to look at Nada's panties, the second time for good after being defeated by Com Pewter. He comes back to the game and picks Nada to be his partner again but fails to remember that there is a chance that Nada will be a False Companion, which she is. He again has to go through the first part of his adventure, but this time his starting point has changed to the Black Village, home to the new Black Wave. Sherlock, one of the members of the Black Wave, joins Nada and Dug on their journey.

Later in Xanth he meets Kim, another Mundane playing the game. Kim is with Bubbles—a dog she found in a bubble—Sammy Cat, and Jenny Elf (her companion). While Dug was completing the first part of his adventure, Kim was having her own. She first was captured by ogres and had to play a mind game with them in order to escape. She then traveled to the Water Wing, where she and Jenny met Cyrus Merman, who is trying to find a wife. He accompanies them on their journey in hopes of finding a wife on the way. When Kim and Dug meet, Kim develops a crush on Dug, but at first Dug does not return the feeling. The two parties attempt to cross the Gap Chasm, but split up, after Dug and Kim decide to switch companions. Kim, Nada, Cyrus, and Bubbles go toward the ocean where Cyrus ends up meeting the merwoman who ends up being his wife, Merci Merwoman, Mela's daughter. Dug, Jenny, and Sherlock head on down the Gap Chasm, where Dug fights a brief battle with the Gap dragon. The teams both go on to the Good Magician's Castle by different routes.
