= Bink =

Bink may refer to:

- Bink (conjunction), a Mexican Asian; a mix of the slurs beaner and chink
- Bink Video, a video format popular in many video games
- Bink (The Magicians of Xanth), a character of the Xanth series by Piers Anthony
- Bink (producer), a hip-hop producer
