= Darrell Sweet =

Darrell Sweet may refer to:

- Darrell Sweet (musician) (1947–1999), Scottish rock musician
- Darrell K. Sweet (1934–2011), American illustrator
