= Isle of View =

1990 novel by Piers Anthony

- First edition
- Author: Piers Anthony
- Cover artist: Darrell K. Sweet
- Language: English
- Series: Xanth series
- Genre: Fantasy
- Publisher: William Morrow
- Publication date: October 1990
- Publication place: United States
- Media type: Print
- Pages: 344
- ISBN: 0-688-10134-8
- OCLC: 22449674
- Preceded by: Man from Mundania
- Followed by: Question Quest

Isle of View is a fantasy novel by American writer Piers Anthony, published in 1989. It is the thirteenth book of the Xanth series.

== Plot ==
Che, Chex Centaur’s winged foal, has been kidnapped by a group of goblins. It is up to Jenny, a girl from the world of Two Moons, to save him. Dolph finally has to decide whom to marry: Electra or Naga Nada.

The book begins in mid-crisis: Che Centaur has been foalnapped. Jenny Elf, wandering in a myopic haze through the World of Two Moons with her cat Sammy, accidentally stumbles through a giant hole between dimensions and ends up in Xanth. Jenny eventually discovers Che being held hostage by a group of goblins, and her attempt to rescue him results in them both being captured by another band of goblins.

Nada Naga, Electra, and the original goblin gang work together and succeed in retrieving Che, Jenny, and Sammy from the new goblin kidnappers. Nada and Electra play a game of chance with the goblins to determine to whom Che goes; the goblins win. The four goblins, Che, Jenny, and Sammy go back to Goblin Mountain where Che is to live. There, Che and Jenny learn why the goblins had kidnapped Che in the first place: they wanted him to be the tutor and companion to Gwendolyn, a young goblin princess who was lame and mostly blind. Because the goblins only respect strength and power, Gwendolyn needed to be able to conceal her physical disabilities by riding on Che's back - otherwise she would be overthrown and killed.

As Che and Jenny are getting to know Gwendolyn, Che's parents call together all the winged monsters in Xanth to start a siege on Goblin Mountain. After much chaos, it is decided that Che will return to his parents, provided that they will take care of Gwendolyn as well.

Prince Dolph finally has to decide which one of his fiancees to marry: Electra or Nada.

== Trivia ==
- Jenny Elf is named after a real reader, a twelve-year-old girl named Jenny Gildwarg, who was the victim of a hit-and-run accident that left her partially paralyzed. The story is also chronicled in the non-fiction account, Letters To Jenny.
- The title is a same-sounding (homophonous) phrase of "I love you", which is a pun.
