= Prostho Plus =

1971 novel by Piers Anthony

- First edition cover
- Author: Piers Anthony
- Publisher: Gollancz
- Publication date: April 1971
- ISBN: 0-575-00646-3

Prostho Plus is a science-fiction novel by Piers Anthony, published in 1971. It is a 'fix-up' from previously published stories (1967-1970). It is a humorous space opera which follows the adventures of a prosthodontist, Dr. Dillingham, who is picked up by aliens who are in need of dental work. Complications develop when he makes a diplomatic blunder and it results in his being exiled to the Galactic University of Dentistry. He graduates and tackles the problems of several unusual clients. His assistant is also kidnapped to be with him. As well, he acquires the "protection" of a robot who will kill him in 50 years (for awakening it; compare The Fisherman and the Jinni).

== Reviews ==
- Sanders, Joe (September 1986). Collins, Robert A.; Latham, Rob (eds.). "Prostho Plus". Fantasy Review.
