= Roc and a Hard Place =

1995 novel by Piers Anthony

- First edition
- Author: Piers Anthony
- Cover artist: Darrell K. Sweet; Carol Russo Design
- Language: English
- Genre: Fantasy novel
- Publisher: TOR Books
- Publication date: October 1995
- Publication place: United States
- Media type: Print (hardcover and paperback)
- Pages: 312 pp (hardcover 1st ed.)
- ISBN: 0-312-85392-0
- OCLC: 32698441
- Dewey Decimal: 813/.54 20
- LC Class: PS3551.N73 R64 1995
- Preceded by: Geis of the Gargoyle
- Followed by: Yon Ill Wind

Roc and a Hard Place is the nineteenth book of the Xanth series by Piers Anthony.

== Plot ==
One year after the events of Geis of the Gargoyle, Demoness Metria, whilst making her husband Veleno deliriously happy, finds that the stork will not acknowledge her summons. Seeking to summon the stork, Metria (and her worse half, D. Mentia) are sent on a quest by the Good Magician Humphrey. Metria is then tasked by the Simurgh to deliver a bag's worth of summons to their respective citizens of Xanth in order to hold a trial for Roxanne Roc. All that remains is to find out why Roxanne Roc is on trial as Metria meets with many old Xanth characters, including Grundy Golem, Sorceress Iris, Magician Trent, Gray Murphy, Jordan the Barbarian and Desiree Dryad.
