= Tarot series =

1979–1980 fantasy novel/trilogy by Piers Anthony

First omnibus edition (publ. Ace Books) Cover Artist: Kinuko Craft

The Tarot series is a series of novels by Piers Anthony published in 1979 and 1980. It was originally written as a single novel, and has subsequently been published as such.

== Series ==
The series consists of God of Tarot, Vision of Tarot, and Faith of Tarot.

== Reception ==
Greg Costikyan reviewed the series in Ares Magazine #2 and commented that "Tarot is readable and pleasant, no mean feat for a pretty much disconnected series of episodes. Anthony has not yet (I hope) reached his full potential, but Tarot is a pleasant way-station in his path of development."

Rob Bricken of Io9 stated that "the Tarot trilogy is nothing less than Anthony's complete and total exploration of religion, morality, sexuality, politics, education, and goodness knows what else."
