= Shade of the Tree =

Novel by Piers Anthony

Shade of the Tree is a novel by Piers Anthony published in 1986.

== Plot summary ==
Shade of the Tree is a novel in which a tree causes supernatural occurrences in a rural setting.

== Reception ==
Dave Langford reviewed Shade of the Tree for White Dwarf #98, and stated that "From Anthony we'd also expect a tidy ending, resolving problems with that inhuman fairness so often found in fairy tales [...] the Tree responsible for interminable forebodings and sinister hallucinations is converted to niceness by a spot of telepathic computer systems analysis."

== Reviews ==
- Review by Alexander Butrym (1986) in Fantasy Review, April 1986
- Review by Debbie Notkin (1986) in Locus, #305 June 1986
- Review by Don D'Ammassa (1986) in Science Fiction Chronicle, #85 October 1986
- Review by Ken Brown (1988) in Interzone, #24 Summer 1988
- Kirkus Reviews
