= Pet Peeve (novel) =

2005 novel by Piers Anthony

- cover of Pet Peeve
- Author: Piers Anthony
- Cover artist: Darrell K. Sweet
- Language: English
- Genre: Fantasy
- Publisher: Tor Books
- Publication date: 2005
- Publication place: United States
- Media type: Print (Hardcover and Paperback)
- Pages: 332
- ISBN: 0-7653-0408-2
- OCLC: 58478623
- Dewey Decimal: 813/.54 22
- LC Class: PS3551.N73 P47 2005
- Preceded by: Currant Events
- Followed by: Stork Naked

Pet Peeve is a fantasy novel by British-American writer Piers Anthony, the twenty-ninth book of the Xanth series.

== Plot summary ==
Goody Goblin, the only nice male goblin, goes to see the Good Magician Humphrey so he can get his question answered. As the Magician charges a year's service or the equivalent, Goody has to find a good home for a pet peeve. The pet peeve is a very annoying bird who can mimic the voice of the person carrying it.

Goody starts out with the bird and Hannah Barbarian, whose service is to accompany the goblin on the quest and protect him. Throughout the journey, we discover that Goody is nice because he had to take reverse wood and disguise himself as a girl to avoid being captured by an invading goblin tribe. He was also married, but his wife is dead because she was fated to die young.

On the trip, Goody and Hannah meet various people. They all refuse to adopt the pet peeve, or in the case of Princesses Melody, Harmony, and Rhythm, are not allowed to by their mother. Goody and Hannah travel to Robot World, one of the moons of Princess Ida, and bring back some robots to live in Xanth. Unfortunately, the robots decide to take over Xanth, which means all of Xanth must unite to fight the menace.

Goblins, ogres, dragons, and other creatures come to combat the robots, which have been expanding, and the harpies feed the armies with lunch boxes from their lunch box plantation. Eventually the robots are defeated. In the process, Goody finally gets over his late wife's death and falls in love with Gwenny Goblin, the first female goblin chief. She in turn falls in love with him, as her time spent with a family of winged centaurs cause her to like only polite goblins. The pet peeve finally gets a home with Grundy Golem, Rapunzel, and their daughter, Surprise Golem.

== Reception ==
Kirkus Reviews defined it "A patently silly tale: all in all, fun, humorous light fantasy."
