= Battle Circle =

Trilogy of science fiction novels by Piers Anthony

Single volume (publ. Avon Books), 1978 Cover artist: Patrick Woodroffe

Battle Circle is a trilogy of science fiction novels by Piers Anthony. Originally published separately, the trilogy was later combined into a single volume.

== Setting ==
The novels take place on a post-apocalyptic Earth. The history is not given in detail, but the landscape is filled with the ruins of the previous civilization, and large areas (referred to as the "badlands") are still deadly because of radiation, presumably from nuclear war. In North America, there are three main civilizations: the crazies, the underworlders, and the nomads, who are the main focus of the novels.

== Combat ==
The nomad society lives by a strict code of conduct. Conflicts over anything, a perceived slight or the right to sleep with a woman, are settled by combat in the battle circle. Often skilled fighters will fight to recruit men into their tribes.

Each man is known by the weapon(s) he wields, hence the names of the title characters. Most men wield one of the six traditional weapons: sword, club, sticks, staff, daggers or morning star (more commonly known as a heavy flail—a spiked ball on a chain). Sos, originally named "Sol the Sword", is forced to give up his name and weapon after being defeated by Sol of All Weapons, and learns to use a non-standard weapon: a metal cable with weights on the end of it. Var wields sticks, essentially two batons, also made of metal. Neq wields a traditional sword.

Despite the fact that the weapons are deadly, fights are rarely fatal. Combat ceases when one man is obviously defeated, either because he cannot defend himself or because he has left the circle, voluntarily or otherwise.

Combat can also be between teams, either fighting together in pairs or in multiple single matches. In the latter case, strategy can become involved choosing whom to put in the circle against a particular opponent.

== Names ==
The nomads have a very particular naming convention. Men choose their own first name, which follows the pattern consonant-vowel-consonant. As mentioned above, their last name is the weapon(s) they wield. Women are inherently nameless, and when they are bound to a man (a situation which is breakable at any time by either party) her name is the man's name plus a. Children take the name of their father plus i. So if Var had a wife, she would be Vara, and if they had children, they would all be known as Vari until they achieved adulthood.

== Series synopsis ==
=== Sos the Rope (1968) ===
Two wandering warriors meet at an isolated hostel, one of many maintained by the crazies for their own inexplicable reasons. A dispute breaks out when they discover they share the same name. Sol of All Weapons insists that Sol the Sword change his name. When the latter refuses, they enter the battle circle. Sol the Sword nearly wins with an ingenious maneuver, but his opponent is superlatively skilled and defeats him. Now nameless, the loser is honor-bound to trek to the Mountain to end his life. However, Sol of All Weapons is greatly impressed by his opponent's astuteness. Sol offers part of a name (Sos) in return for becoming his adviser. For Sol has a grand dream: to forge an empire from the many small tribes. It is revealed that the people in the Mountain, a remnant of the ancient civilization, produce goods that the crazies give to the nomads, thus stabilizing the society. Eventually Sol, along with Sos' daughter (whom Sol claims as his own), is forced to the Mountain and Sos is ordered by the underworld to dismantle the empire.

=== Var the Stick (1972) ===
Rather than dismantling the empire Sos leads an attack on the Mountain and it is eventually destroyed. His (and in her mind Sol's) daughter escapes with Var and, pursued by both Sol and Sos, they flee via the Aleutian Islands to China, which has reconstituted an imperial civilization. Reconciled with Sol and Sos, they start back to America. Pursued by the Emperor of China, the two older men die so that the others can escape.

=== Neq the Sword (1975) ===
With the Mountain in ruins nomadic civilization is collapsing into barbarism. Working with the remaining crazies Neq attempts to reconstitute his society. Through a misunderstanding he kills the returning Var, but establishes a relationship with the daughter of Sol and Sos. In time the Mountain is restored under Neq's leadership and without secrecy. At the close of the book the inhabitants of the Mountain are developing trade with a similar site in Latin America. It will take a long time, but slowly civilization is being rebuilt.
