= Harpy Thyme =

Novel by Piers Anthony

- First edition (UK)
- Author: Piers Anthony
- Cover artist: Mick Posen
- Language: English
- Series: Xanth Series
- Genre: Fantasy
- Publisher: Hodder & Stoughton (1993, UK) Tor Books (1994, US)
- Publication place: United States
- Media type: Print (Hardcover and Paperback)
- Pages: 314 (hardcover first edition)
- ISBN: 0-312-85390-4
- OCLC: 28964406
- Dewey Decimal: 813/.54 20
- LC Class: PS3551.N73 H37 1994
- Preceded by: Demons Don't Dream
- Followed by: Geis of the Gargoyle

Harpy Thyme is a fantasy novel by American writer Piers Anthony, the seventeenth book of the Xanth series.

== Plot summary ==
Gloha Goblin-Harpy is searching for love, and decides to ask the Magician Humfrey where she can find it. He tells her to ask his second son Crombie the Soldier. Gloha goes on a quest for love, accompanied by Magician Trent and Cynthia, a winged centaur filly.
