= Mute (novel) =

1981 novel by Piers Anthony

First edition (publ. Avon Books) Cover artist: Ron Walotsky

Mute is a novel by Piers Anthony published in 1981.

== Plot summary ==
Mute is a novel in which the mutant named Knot and the galactic agent named Finesse oppose the Lobos as they try to take over the Galactic Co-ordination Computer.

== Reception ==
Dave Langford reviewed Mute for White Dwarf #55, and stated that "Parts are exciting; parts are risible; Anthony's tortuously fair conclusion may surprise trad space-opera fans. His heart's in the right place, but he isn't half verbose and didactic. Better, anyway, than his fantasies."

== Reviews ==
- Review by Ian Williams (1981) in Paperback Inferno, Volume 5, Number 2
- Review by Alan Fraser (1984) in Paperback Inferno, #51
- Review by Tom A. Jones (1987) in Paperback Inferno, #66
- Review by Peter T. Garratt (1988) in Interzone, #23 Spring 1988
