= Jumper Cable =

2009 novel by Piers Anthony

- First edition
- Author: Piers Anthony
- Cover artist: Darrell K. Sweet; Carol Russo Design
- Language: English
- Genre: Fantasy
- Publisher: Tor Books
- Publication date: 2009
- Publication place: United States
- Media type: Print (Hardcover and Paperback)
- Preceded by: Two to the Fifth
- Followed by: Knot Gneiss

Jumper Cable is a fantasy novel by British-American writer Piers Anthony. It is the 33rd book of the Xanth series.

== Plot introduction ==
Jumper Spider, the descendant of the spider who accompanied Magician Dor on his adventure to the past, has been caught by a narrative hook and dropped into the human realm of Xanth. Wishing to return home, he teams up with seven lovely maidens to help restore the link between Xanth and Mundania which had been damaged by the Demon Pluto, who is angry for being demoted to a Dwarf Demon causing him to do all he can to stop the group of adventurers from succeeding.
