= Knot Gneiss =

2010 novel by Piers Anthony

- First edition
- Author: Piers Anthony
- Cover artist: Darrell K. Sweet; Carol Russo Design
- Language: English
- Genre: Fantasy
- Publisher: Tor Books
- Publication date: 12 October 2010
- Publication place: United States
- Media type: Print (Hardcover and Paperback)
- Pages: 304
- ISBN: 0-7653-2352-4
- Preceded by: Jumper Cable
- Followed by: Well-Tempered Clavicle

Knot Gneiss is a fantasy novel by British-American writer Piers Anthony, the 34th book of the Xanth series.
