= Xone of Contention =

1999 novel by Piers Anthony

- First edition
- Author: Piers Anthony
- Cover artist: Darrell K. Sweet; Carol Russo Design
- Language: English
- Genre: Fantasy novel
- Published: 1 October 1999
- Publisher: St. Martin's Press
- Publication place: United States
- Media type: Print (hardback & paperback)
- Pages: 304 (first edition, hardcover)
- ISBN: 0-312-86691-7 (first edition, hardcover)
- OCLC: 41338005
- Dewey Decimal: 813/.54 21
- LC Class: PS3551.N73 X66 1999
- Preceded by: Zombie Lover
- Followed by: The Dastard

Xone of Contention is the twenty-third book of the Xanth series by Piers Anthony.

== Plot introduction ==
Dug, the Mundane who had had an adventure in Xanth through the Companions of Xanth computer game, is now happily married to Kim. His friend Edsel on the other hand is on the rock with his marriage to Pia, Dug's old girlfriend, who wants a divorce. Edsel, not wanting to lose her strikes a deal with her, they take a two-week vacation in Xanth, switching with Nimby and Chlorine who want to learn about Mundania, and if she doesn't change her mind, he won't fight it.
