= Currant Events =

2004 novel by Piers Anthony

- First edition
- Author: Piers Anthony
- Cover artist: Darrell K. Sweet; Carol Russo Design
- Language: English
- Genre: Fantasy
- Publisher: Tor Books
- Publication date: October 2004
- Publication place: United States
- Media type: Print (hardback & paperback)
- Pages: 329 (hardcover 1st ed.)
- ISBN: 0-7653-0407-4
- OCLC: 54974370
- Dewey Decimal: 813/.54 22
- LC Class: PS3551.N73 C87 2004
- Preceded by: Cube Route
- Followed by: Pet Peeve

Currant Events is a 2004 fantasy novel by British-American writer Piers Anthony, the twenty-eighth book of the Xanth series and the first book in the second Xanth trilogy.

== Plot introduction ==
The plot follows Clio, the Muse of History, as she finally leaves the mountain where she and her sisters live, to find the currant that can clarify her volume of Xanth's history.

== Plot summary ==
Clio, the Muse of History, discovers the twenty-eighth volume of Xanth, but she cannot read it and does not remember writing it. She goes to consult with the Good Magician, who treats her as a Querent. His Answer is that she should look for the currant, and her Service is to restock the extinct dragon population of Xanth. To this end she needs to recruit dragons from one of Ida's moons. He also gives her a magical compass that will direct her toward her objective.

Clio uses the service of Becka, the dragon girl from Castle Maidragon to escort her safely among the dragons. She also uses Che Centaur to prepare organic material, mainly peat, to form bodies for the dragon spirits. She finds the dragon moon of Ida recruits with the help of Drew and Drusie, two tiny telepathic dragons, whose relationship is forbidden. With the help of Dragon's Ida, a dragon herself, she uses the Dragon-net to bring the recruited dragon souls back to Xanth.

Back in Xanth, Clio follows the directives of the magical compass and performs various tasks all over Xanth. She encounters Sherlock, a man from the Black Wave, banished from his village after a series of odd accidents. It turns out that after a decade in Xanth, Sherlock developed a magical talent – to summon and control reverse wood. As part of his experiments with the reverse wood he creates a Golem called Getaway Golem. Sherlock joins Clio in her quest, and later creates a lady Golem called Comealong as a companion for Getaway.

Clios adventure takes her throughout Xanth, including Counter Xanth, where she meets the protagonists of Cube Route, and establishes a computer link with Xanth. She also travels to Mundania where she meets Arnold Centaur and David Baldwin. She also meets Umlaut and Surprise Golem, stranded in the Water Zone when rescuing Ciriana - a five-year-old girl whose talent is immunity to the Adult Conspiracy. In Castle Zombie Clio meets Thesis, who holds a magical device called The Spancel. She reveals that it was created by the Mundane Sorceress Morgan le Fay, who now resides in Ptero.

Clio goes back to Ptero, to return the Spancel, where she is forced to confront the sorceress. She prevails with the aid of Sherlock, who saves her from the sorceress and from Demon Lithosphere. Finally, they return to Mount Parnassus, where they discover the currant plant in the garden. They revive the plant with the various artifacts retrieved during the quest, and take the big currant it grows. They discover that the twenty eighth volume was replaced with Humfrey's Book of Answers. After Sherlock uses his powers to switch the books back, they use the juice to decipher the text of the book. Back in Mount Parnassus Clio finally realizes that Sherlock's talent is magician level, making him eligible to marry her. Only after Drew and Drusie intervene is she able to tell him that she loves him back. They adopt Ciriana and decide to live in normal Xanth. Finally, Clio realizes that her whole adventure had been another Demon bet, and verifies it with Venus who acknowledges the fact.

== Dragon ==
Dragon is one of Ida's moons. It is shaped as an Orbros, and unlike other moons it seems to be sentient. Dragon Ida, living on the tip of the tail, says that it is the source of all dragons. The dragons of the moon are arranged in five categories - environment, weapon, size, nature, and mental nature. There are five aspects for each category, making a total of 3,125 permutations, each considered a dragon type. Drew and Drusie are both tiny, air, telepathic, and committed dragons, but his weapon is fire and hers is steam, and therefore are not allowed to breed on Dragon.

== See also ==
- Muses in popular culture
