= Tatham Mound =

1991 fantasy-historical novel written by Piers Anthony

- First edition
- Author: Piers Anthony
- Cover artist: Jerry LoFaro
- Language: English
- Publisher: William Morrow
- Publication date: 1991
- Publication place: United States
- Pages: 522
- ISBN: 978-0-688-10140-4

Tatham Mound is a 1991 fantasy-historical novel written by Piers Anthony. The story tells of Throat Shot, a member of the Floridian Toco tribe, and his quest to prevent an unknown danger from harming his people. The story was inspired by finds at Tatham Mound, located near the Withlacoochee River in Citrus County, Florida.

== Summary ==
During his first raid, an Indian boy named Hotfoot is injured by a rival tribe's arrow piercing through his upper arm, eventually crippling him. In an attempt to hide from his pursuers, Hotfoot stumbles upon a burial mound, watched over by its Spirit, Dead Eagle. It is Dead Eagle who chooses Hotfoot for a very important task: a terrible danger is coming, and in order to discover a way to avoid it, Hotfoot must seek out a quartz crystal called the Ulunsuti, which is guarded by a terrible snake known as the Uktena. To help him in his quest, Dead Eagle gives Hotfoot the ability to communicate with the dead, though Hotfoot will find that many will not speak to him later on. Not only that, but Hotfoot's fear has been taken away as well. Reluctantly, Hotfoot accepts the mission.

== Characters ==
- Throat Shot: The protagonist, a member of the Tocobaga people of Florida (shortened to Toco in the novel). Earning his name when he set foot on hot sand as a child, Throat Shot earned his new name when he fatally shot a Cale in the throat during a raid with two of his fellow tribesmen. Though his tribe now viewed him as a man for his actions, Throat Shot feels shock over what he'd done. His upper left arm no longer works due to an arrow piercing through it during that same raid. He is now tasked with finding a crystal to help prevent a danger from harming his people.
- Tzec: A young girl who was captured by the Toco and kept at their village of Ibi Hica when Throat Shot and the Trader arrived. Throat Shot eventually marries her. Her mother, the Lady Zox, is a member of the Maya, taken away from her homeland as a slave by a man who was ordered to protect her, while her father was a Calusa priest. Tzec had taken an interest with Throat Shot, and wishes that he would be able to buy her, but she is later taken on as the Trader's foster daughter. An ancestor of hers, known as Little Blood, played an important role in an Aztec myth.
- Wren: Daughter of Throat Shot and Tzec.
- The Trader: A man that Throat Shot first travels with. Like his name implies, The Trader travels through the region, trading with other tribes. He has one sister, named Three Scales.
