= Centaur Aisle =

1981 fantasy novel by Piers Anthony

- First edition
- Author: Piers Anthony
- Cover artist: Michael Whelan
- Language: English
- Genre: Fantasy
- Publisher: Del Rey Books
- Publication date: December 1981
- Publication place: United States
- Media type: Print (Paperback)
- Pages: 294 (paperback 16th printing)
- ISBN: 0-345-29770-9
- OCLC: 27954072
- Preceded by: Castle Roogna
- Followed by: Ogre, Ogre

Centaur Aisle is a fantasy novel by American writer Piers Anthony, the fourth book of the Xanth series.

King Trent has left Xanth on a mission of trade to Mundania and has left Dor as temporary king. When Trent fails to return after some time, Dor must find a way to rescue Trent. He is informed that the means to rescue Trent lies to the south on Centaur Isle, the home of a tribe of centaurs.

== Plot ==
Xanth's King Trent has left for dreary Mundania, leaving Dor to practice governing the magical kingdom. Dor's magical talent is communication with the inanimate which for information gathering is very helpful, but for dealing with citizens needing discipline it leaves room for improvement. But when Trent goes to establish trade routes with Mundania, Dor and his friends (a golem named Grundy, the centaur Chet, Smash the ogre, and Dor's love interest, King Trent's daughter Princess Irene) must keep the land in line.

However, the former King Trent does not return when he had planned. After waiting two weeks, Dor gathers his gang and goes on a quest to help rescue Trent.

This mission leads them to Centaur Isle, to find an unknown Centaur Magician. Centaurs are very negative about magical talents, so when they find Arnolde the Centaur and discover his talent, he is exiled and willing to help them rescue Trent. Arnolde's talent is a magical aisle, creating a field of magic around him that allows anyone to use magic in Mundania.

The gang (minus Chet) travel north by rainbow to Mundania. While in Mundania, they find a scholar named Ichabod. From him, they learn that they are in the wrong time strand and must go back to Xanth and re-cross the border. Eventually Dor and his friends find the correct strand and go to the castle where they think Trent and his wife Iris were last. After a nice dinner and a little betrayal, they are locked in a dungeon. After escaping, they smash down walls to find Trent and his new friend King Omen, the proper king of this area.

The group (plus the new additions) struggles to get Omen onto his rightful throne. After exchanging farewells, they decide to return to Xanth with King Trent and Queen Iris.

== Characters ==
- Dor
- Irene
- Smash
- Grundy
- Chet
- Arnolde
