= Faun & Games =

1997 novel by Piers Anthony

- First edition
- Author: Piers Anthony
- Cover artist: Darrell K. Sweet; Carol Russo Design
- Language: English
- Genre: Fantasy novel
- Publisher: Tor Books
- Publication date: October 1997
- Publication place: United States
- Media type: Print (Hardcover and Paperback)
- Pages: 312 pp (hardcover 1st ed.)
- ISBN: 0-312-86162-1
- OCLC: 36776536
- Dewey Decimal: 813/.54 21
- LC Class: PS3551.N73 F38 1997
- Preceded by: Yon Ill Wind
- Followed by: Zombie Lover

Faun & Games is the twenty-first book of the Xanth series by Piers Anthony.

== Plot ==
A young faun discovers his friend has gone missing into the Void and thus, the tree that nymph is bound to will wither and die. The hero wishes to save his friend's tree but in doing so, he risks his own tree. After visiting the Good Magician, Forrest Faun is sent with Mare Imbri to Ptero to find a faun for the tree. His journey later takes him from Ptero to smaller moons that orbit that specific world's Ida.

== Characters in Faun & Games ==
- Forrest Fawn
- Mare Imbrium
- Eve
- Dawn
- Ida
- Magician Humphrey
