= Swell Foop =

2001 novel by Piers Anthony

- First edition
- Author: Piers Anthony
- Cover artist: Darrell K. Sweet; Carol Russo Design
- Language: English
- Genre: Fantasy
- Publisher: Tor Books
- Publication date: October 2001
- Publication place: United States
- Media type: Print (Hardcover and Paperback)
- Pages: 292 (first edition, hardback)
- ISBN: 0-312-86906-1 (first edition, hardback)
- OCLC: 47136701
- Dewey Decimal: 813/.54 21
- LC Class: PS3551.N73 S86 2001
- Preceded by: The Dastard
- Followed by: Up In A Heaval

Swell Foop is a fantasy novel by British-American writer Piers Anthony, the twenty-fifth book of the Xanth series.

The title is taken from a spoonerism for the Shakespearean phrase "one fell swoop," famously (but not first) spoken by the tongue-twisted Peter Sellers character in the 1964 movie The Pink Panther.

== Plot summary ==
Cynthia Centaur and her companions must find the Six Rings of Xanth (Air, Earth, Fire, Water, Void, and the Idea) in order to find the Swell Foop and use it to rescue the Demon E(A/R)^{th} from the thrall of the Demoness Fornax.

== Characters ==
- Cynthia Centaur
- Che Centaur
- Sim
- Jaylin
- The Demons FO(R\N)^{ax}, JU(P/I)^{ter}, M(A/R)^{s}, V(E\N)^{us}, E(A/R)^{th} and ME(R/C)^{ury}
- Justin Tree
- Breanna
