= Question Quest =

1991 novel by Piers Anthony

- First edition
- Author: Piers Anthony
- Cover artist: Darrell K. Sweet
- Language: English
- Genre: Fantasy
- Publisher: William Morrow
- Publication date: October 1991
- Publication place: United States
- Media type: Print
- Pages: 359
- ISBN: 0-688-10898-9
- OCLC: 24475560
- Preceded by: Isle of View
- Followed by: The Color of Her Panties

Question Quest is a fantasy novel by American writer Piers Anthony, the fourteenth book of the Xanth series.

== Plot summary ==
The book begins with Lacuna, one of the mischievous Castle Zombie twins, seeking a way to fix her "dull" life. To do so she comes to ask Grey, Ivy's betrothed and pro-tem magician of knowledge, for the answer. However, Grey doesn't want to answer her question because he knows that something terrible will come of it. Lacuna decides to make a deal that even Grey can't refuse, a way to outwit Com-Pewter. Lacuna plans to use her ability to change prints and write new ones to help Grey. Seeing no other choice, Grey decides to help her, but he realizes that he can't fathom what the book of knowledge is trying to say. Therefore, he sends her to the anteroom of hell to talk to Magician Humfrey. When Lacuna arrives in the anteroom, she finds Humfrey sleeping. After waking Humfrey up, she found out that he is waiting to talk to the Demon X(A/N)^{th} to free his wife Rose. Humfrey tells her to write down his life story (and most of Xanth's history in the process), on the walls, so that he can get the demon's attention. It turns out that Humfrey has five wives. Humfrey manages to save his wives from the pits of hell (sort of) and Lacuna changes her life.
