= Geis of the Gargoyle =

Novel by Piers Anthony

- First UK edition (1994)
- Author: Piers Anthony
- Cover artist: Mick Posen
- Language: English
- Series: Xanth Series
- Genre: Fantasy
- Publisher: BCA/Hodder & Stoughton (1994, UK); Tor Books (1995, US)
- Publication place: United States
- Media type: Print (Hardcover and Paperback)
- Pages: 315 (hardcover 1st ed.)
- ISBN: 0-312-85391-2
- OCLC: 31518074
- Dewey Decimal: 813/.54 20
- LC Class: PS3551.N73 G35 1995
- Preceded by: Harpy Thyme
- Followed by: Roc and a Hard Place

Geis of the Gargoyle is a fantasy novel by American writer Piers Anthony, the eighteenth book of the Xanth series.

== Plot ==
Seeking a spell that will restore the polluted river Swan Knee to a state of purity, guardian Gary Gargoyle finds himself face-to-face with the Magician Humfrey. Humfrey tells Gary to go and find the philter. Instead of serving the usual one year, Gary has to become a man with the help of Trent, who has gone into the brain coral's pool along with his wife Iris, and civilize a 5 year old child named Surprise. Iris comes along for the quest after having a rejuvenation potion. Surprise is a kid with as many talents as there are thinkable, but only one at a time. When Gary gets some direction, they go off to search for the philter in the middle of the madness, which is spreading further out, in the ruins of stone hinge. Once there, in an attempt to search for where the philter could be, Iris recreates the past that Gary revealed to them from reading the stones. After the illusions are being recreated, some illusions that are not Iris's come and start communicating with the group. Eventually, they find that the illusions are trying to steal Gary's soul. They then discover that a demon is creating the illusions, and is also the philter, and in order to stop the madness from spreading, and to clean the rivers coming in to Xanth, they have to put the philter back into 'The Interface'. An old spell that the ancients who created stone hinge used to tame the madness, and separate Xanth from Mundania. They apparently thought the philter had also gone into 'the interface', but it had managed to hide itself instead of entering. After much confusion, they manage to get the philter into the interface. Upon locating the philter, they also find out that Surprise can only use each talent once. Surprise became much more mature after learning that she cannot perform the same talent more than once, and Gary no longer has to purify the river of Swan Knee.
