= Well-Tempered Clavicle =

Novel by Piers Anthony

- First edition
- Author: Piers Anthony
- Cover artist: Darrell K. Sweet
- Language: English
- Genre: Fantasy novel
- Publisher: Tor Books
- Publication date: 22 November 2011
- Publication place: United States
- Media type: Print (Hardcover)
- Pages: 320
- ISBN: 978-0-7653-3134-2
- Preceded by: Knot Gneiss
- Followed by: Luck of the Draw

Well-Tempered Clavicle is the 35th book of the Xanth series by Piers Anthony. The title is a pun on the Bach musical work The Well-Tempered Clavier.

The back cover of the book states the following:

"When a walking skeleton named Picka Bones happens upon a trio of melodic pets and a lovely, lovelorn princess, his dull and passionless existence is suddenly filled with danger, excitement, and the temptations of the flesh. For a plague of appalling puns has been unleashed on Xanth, and only Picka's musical gifts have the power to save the enchanted realm from the dire monster who imperils it."
