= Luck of the Draw (novel) =

2012 book by Piers Anthony

- First edition
- Author: Piers Anthony
- Cover artist: Julie Dillon
- Language: English
- Genre: Fantasy
- Publisher: TOR Books
- Publication date: December 2012
- Publication place: United States
- Media type: Print (hardback & paperback)
- Pages: 350
- ISBN: 978-0-7653-3135-9
- Preceded by: Well-Tempered Clavicle
- Followed by: Esrever Doom

Luck of the Draw is the 36th book of the Xanth series by Piers Anthony.

== Plot summary ==
Bryce, an 80-year-old human in poor health, is transported to Xanth and magically restored to his fit 21-year-old self. He has been drawn to Xanth to participate in a quest to win the hand of young Princess Harmony as part of a Demon wager. Bryce has no interest in marrying but a love spell has been cast on him to compel his participation. To aid him, Bryce has been given the gift of second sight (foresight of an event a few seconds into the future) and a magic tablet. Items drawn on the tablet are able to take three-dimensional shape.

There are five other suitors for the Princess' hand: Lucky, a youth whose talent is good fortune; Arsenal, a combat expert; Piper, who can be either man or monster; D Pose; a demon who seeks to conquer Xanth by marrying the Princess; and Anna Moly ("Anomaly"), whose talent is to cause the unexpected to happen. (Anna is acting on behalf of her brother, Justin.) All six suitors cooperate in a quest to find a suitable gift that will cause the princess to choose them to marry. They are accompanied on their quest by Mindy, a 20-year-old Mundane who attempted suicide before coming to Xanth.

Bryce, despite his rejuvenation, is still mentally an octagenarian. Even though he's had a love spell placed on him, he is determined to resist marriage to someone the same age as his granddaughter. Harmony has no interest in being compelled to marry anyone because of a Demon wager, but especially not a cranky old Mundane.

== Reception ==
Kirkus Reviews criticizes the prose and states that the dialogue can sometimes be "clunky and artless".

Library Journal stated "This is sure to please longtime fans and also serves as an introduction to readers who may be new to the beloved series."
