= Juxtaposition (novel) =

1982 novel by Piers Anthony

First edition Del Rey Books Cover artist: Laurence Schwinger

Juxtaposition is a novel by Piers Anthony published in 1982.

== Plot summary ==
Juxtaposition is the third novel in the series after Split Infinity and Blue Adept.

== Reception ==
Dave Langford reviewed Juxtaposition for White Dwarf #47, and stated that "Juxtaposition is more, much more, very much more of the same stuff from the previous two, and sometimes I thought it would never end, as in a final stroke of miscalculation Anthony allows his twin worlds of magic and technology to merge in a prolonged tussle goblins, golems, tanks, power winches, unicorns, plastic explosive, magicians, cannon - which bores on into wearisome farce."

== Reviews ==
- Review by Richard Mathews (1982) in Science Fiction & Fantasy Book Review, #6, July–August 1982
- Review by W. Ritchie Benedict (1984) in Thrust, #20, Summer 1984
- Review [French] by Daniel Lemoine (1985) in Fiction, #362
