= Cube Route =

2003 novel by Piers Anthony

- Author: Piers Anthony
- Cover artist: Darrell K. Sweet; Carol Russo Design
- Language: English
- Genre: Fantasy
- Publisher: Tor Books
- Publication date: October 2003
- Publication place: United States
- Media type: Print (hardback & paperback)
- Pages: 328 pp (hardcover 1st ed.)
- ISBN: 0-7653-4309-6
- OCLC: 56722923
- Preceded by: Up In A Heaval
- Followed by: Currant Events

Cube Route is a fantasy novel by British-American writer Piers Anthony, the twenty-seventh book of the Xanth series.

== Pangrammatic window ==
The shortest known published pangrammatic window, a stretch of naturally occurring text that contains all the letters in the alphabet, is found on page 98 of the 2004 First Mass Market Edition. The passage, which is 42 letters long (in boldface), reads: "We are all from Xanth," Cube said quickly. "Just visiting Phaze. We just want to find the dragon."
