= Castle Roogna =

1979 fantasy novel by Piers Anthony

- First edition
- Author: Piers Anthony
- Cover artist: Darrell K. Sweet
- Language: English
- Genre: Fantasy
- Publisher: Del Rey Books
- Publication date: July 1979
- Publication place: United States
- Media type: Print (Paperback)
- Pages: 329 (paperback 22nd printing)
- ISBN: 0-345-35048-0
- OCLC: 27954084
- Preceded by: The Source of Magic
- Followed by: Centaur Aisle

Castle Roogna is a fantasy novel by British-American writer Piers Anthony, the third book in the Xanth series. The titular castle is also the residence of the present King of Xanth, within the narrative.

This is the first edition of the book and was published by Del Rey Books in July 1979.

== Plot summary ==
Dor, a twelve-year-old magician, is next in line to inherit the throne of Xanth. However, his confidence is low because he is bullied by his age mates, including royal princess Irene, because of his power of making unliving objects talk. Adding to Dor's chagrin is his onsetting puberty, which makes him aware of his nanny Millie, a former ghost for 800 years who is in love with a zombie named Jonathan. To teach him the skills he will need to rule the kingdom, and to help him get over his attraction to Millie, King Trent sends him on a mission 800 years into Xanth's past to find the ancient and mysterious Zombie Master, who was the only Xanthian with the knowledge to create an elixir which could return a zombie to life. After striking a deal with the Brain Coral to safeguard his body during his trip, Dor casts his consciousness into the past via Magician Humfrey's magic and a decorative wall tapestry inside Castle Roogna.

In the past, Dor finds himself inhabiting the body of an invading Mundanian barbarian, and accompanied by a spider named Jumper, who had accidentally been drawn into the past with him and was enlarged to giant size by the magical transfer. They end up rescuing a young girl, who turns out to be a younger Millie. Together they travel to Castle Roogna, which is still under construction in that era and is about to be caught in the midst of a massive battle between a horde of goblins and a flock of harpies, and—indirectly—by the magician Murphy. With King Roogna's forces too small to ward off the attack, Dor, Jumper and Millie are sent to ask the Zombie Master for aid. The Zombie Master, living as a hermit due to his power, at first refuses, but is swayed when he and Millie fall in love with each other.

After deflecting a Mundanian attack against the Zombie Master's castle by making a temporary alliance with the local Dragon King, Dor, Jumper, Millie and the Zombie Master return to Castle Roogna in the nick of time to relieve the defenders. Among the castle's occupants, they meet the neo-Sorceress Vadne, who expresses a desire to wed the Zombie Master. With great effort, Dor's inventive use of his magical gift, and the use of a powerful forget spell, they are eventually able to defeat their monstrous assailants and even resolve the cause for the conflict between the two species. However, disaster nearly strikes when Millie suddenly disappears. Jealous of Millie's relationship with the Zombie Master, Vadne transformed and concealed her, threatening to let her die unless the Zombie Master marries her. Outraged, King Roogna sentences Vadne to eternal stasis in the Brain Coral's abode. Despite the loss of Millie, the Zombie Master declares that his zombie forces will remain to defend Castle Roogna, before he hangs himself and his own magic turns him into a zombie. This defeats Murphy's power, and he eventually exiles himself to stasis with the Brain Coral as well.

After bidding their friends goodbye, Dor and Jumper return to their original time, where Jumper resumes his previous life as a tiny spider in Castle Roogna. When Dor returns to report to Trent, he discovers that the Brain Coral has used his body to find out more about human relationships, leading to Irene discovering her true romantic inclinations towards Dor. In the end, Dor uses the resurrection elixir to restore Jonathan to life, revealing him as the Zombie Master and reuniting him with his love Millie.

== Characters ==
- Dor – The twelve-year-old son of Bink and Chameleon, and the story's main protagonist.
- Jumper – A normal, but unusually intelligent and observant spider living in Castle Roogna which is accidentally drawn into the past along with Dor, gaining giant size in the process. With Jumper unable to speak the human tongue, Dor uses one of Jumper's webs to communicate with him.
- Millie – A very beautiful young woman and until recently a ghost for 800 years. Her special talent is sex appeal.
- Jonathan – The Zombie Master, able to transform corpses into zombie allies.
- Grundy Golem – Originally animated by Humfrey, his talent is to communicate with any living thing in its own language. He is Dor's best friend and minder.
- Roogna – A Magician whose talent is adapting the property of a magical power or object to his own desires.
- Murphy – A Magician whose talent is causing an event to resolve in the most seemingly disadvantageous way for those targeted by Murphy's magic. Despite being Roogna's rival in assuming rulership over Xanth, their relationship is unusually amicable.
- Vadne – A neo-Sorceress whose talent consists of topology: The changing of an object's shape but not its other original characteristics. For instance, while she is able to turn a goblin's shape into a brick, that brick displays none of a normal brick's other physical attributes, remaining essentially a goblin in brick form. Because this limitation ranks her below a Xanthian Magician, she wishes to marry one to raise her social status.
- Helen the Harpy – An unusually beautiful and moderate member of her species who becomes Dor's friend when he is brought to her by her flockmates to enable procreation, and aids his and Millie's escape after learning of his true age.
- The King of Dragons – An ancient dragon, and the king of all monsters inhabiting the jungle near the Zombie Master's castle.
- Mike – A Mundanian barbarian whose body is taken over by Dor's consciousness when the latter travels into the past. His own mind is cast into a flea living on his body, in which he torments Dor time and again by biting him at the most inopportune moments.
