= Yon Ill Wind =

1996 novel by Piers Anthony

- First edition cover (UK)
- Author: Piers Anthony
- Cover artist: Peter Elson
- Language: English
- Genre: Fantasy novel
- Published: Hodder & Stoughton (August 1996, UK); Tor Books (October 1996, US)
- Publication place: United States
- Media type: Print (Hardcover and Paperback)
- Pages: 314 pp (first edition, hardback)
- ISBN: 0-312-86227-X (first edition, hardback)
- OCLC: 34617846
- Dewey Decimal: 813/.54 20
- LC Class: PS3551.N73 Y66 1996
- Preceded by: Roc and a Hard Place
- Followed by: Faun & Games

Yon Ill Wind is the 20th novel of the Xanth series by Piers Anthony.

== Plot summary ==
Hurricane Happy Bottom is causing problems in Mundania and Xanth. The Mundane Baldwin family is blown into Xanth by a Yon Ill Wind. Also, Demon X(A/N)^{th} has made a wager with Demon JU(P/I)^{ter} that he could cause a Xanthian to shed a tear. The demons change up by making X(A/N)^{th} into a dragon ass and is only able to talk once explaining to a Xanthian what the quest is. As Nimby, Demon X(A/N)^{th} meets Chlorine and makes her beautiful and talented. Together with the Baldwin family, they must banish Happy Bottom from Xanth.

== Characters in Yon Ill Wind ==
Nimby - The Demon X(A/N)^{TH} for the duration of the novel. His natural form is a dragon ass, with the head of a donkey, the body of a dragon. His name stands for Not In My Back Yard, an apt description of where he is welcome in his natural form (i.e., nowhere). He is granted speech for one moment, is bound to the first person with whom he associates and can act only at the direction of that person. He must remain so until that person sheds a tear for him.

Chlorine - The companion of Nimby. She was accidentally chosen when Nimby was trying to get a woman, Miss Fortune, whose talent is to make things go wrong. Chlorine's talent is to poison water.

The Baldwin family - A mundane family that was brought into Xanth by the "tropical storm" later to be hurricane Gladys, a.k.a. Happy Bottom. Jim Baldwin (father), Mary Baldwin (mother) and children Sean Baldwin (17), David Baldwin (12) and Karen Baldwin (6).

Baldwin pets - Woofer, dog, his master is Sean. Midrange, cat, his master is David. Tweeter, parakeet, his master is Karen.

Willow Elf - A large winged elf from a big winged tree. Bathed in a love spring with Sean after saving his life. They fell in love and she was given a pass by Good Magician Humfrey to enter and leave Xanth so she could be with Sean.
