= Anthonology =

Anthonology is a collection by Piers Anthony published in 1985.

== Plot summary ==
Anthonology is a collection of 21 science-fiction and fantasy short stories.

1. Possible to Rue
2. The Toaster
3. Quinquepedalian
4. Encounter
5. Phog
6. The Ghost Galaxies (The author prefers the title "Ghost")
7. Within the Cloud (The author prefers the title "Cloud")
8. The Life of the Stripe
9. In the Jaws of Danger (The author prefers the title "The Value of a Man")
10. Beak by Beak
11. Getting through University (The author prefers the title "University")
12. In the Barn
13. Up Schist Crick
14. The Whole Truth
15. The Bridge
16. On the Uses of Torture
17. Small Mouth, Bad Taste
18. Wood You?
19. Hard Sell
20. Hurdle
21. Gone to the Dogs

== Reception ==
Dave Langford reviewed Anthonology for White Dwarf #86, and stated that "Some display the compulsive daftness of Anthony at his best [...] many could usefully have remained in obscurity; one is an incredibly filthy joke which would shock your editor if described here. Acerbic introductions bewail the bad taste of editors and the obtuseness of critics."

== Reviews ==
- Review by W. D. Stevens (1986) in Fantasy Review, May 1986
- Review by Robert Coulson (1987) in Amazing Stories, May 1987
- Review by Ken Brown (1987) in Interzone, #20 Summer 1987
