= Zombie Lover =

1998 book by Piers Anthony

- First edition
- Author: Piers Anthony
- Cover artist: Darrell K. Sweet; Carol Russo Design
- Language: English
- Genre: Fantasy novel
- Published: 1998 (Tor Books)
- Publication place: United States
- Media type: Print (Hardcover and Paperback)
- Pages: 294 pp (hardcover 1st ed.)
- ISBN: 0-8125-5512-0
- OCLC: 42727177
- Preceded by: Faun & Games
- Followed by: Xone of Contention

Zombie Lover is the twenty-second book of the Xanth series by Piers Anthony.

== Plot summary ==
Breanna, a beautiful young newcomer to the enchanted land of Xanth, must deal with a distressing dilemma. She has unwittingly attracted the affections of King Xeth, ruler of Xanth's Zombies, who yearns to make her Queen of the Undead.
