= The Source of Magic =

1979 fantasy novel by Piers Anthony

- First edition
- Author: Piers Anthony
- Cover artist: Doug Beekman
- Language: English
- Genre: Fantasy
- Publisher: Del Rey Books
- Publication date: February 1979
- Publication place: United States
- Media type: Print (Paperback)
- Pages: 326 (paperback 27th printing)
- ISBN: 0-345-35058-8
- OCLC: 27954102
- Preceded by: A Spell for Chameleon
- Followed by: Castle Roogna

The Source of Magic is a fantasy novel by British-American writer Piers Anthony, the second book of the Xanth series. This novel begins one year after the events of A Spell for Chameleon, and describes the adventures of Bink after he has settled down with his pregnant wife, Chameleon. King Trent had appointed Bink the Official Researcher of Xanth at the end of the previous book, and given him the task to discover Xanth's source of magic.

According to Popular Science magazine, the book is the first time the word "de-extinction" was ever used.

== Plot summary ==
On his way to Queen Iris's masquerade ball in honor of Trent's accession to the throne one year before, Bink is attacked by a floating sword, which he deflects using his talent of protection against magical harm. At the ball, he is attacked again by an unseen enemy. Finally, Bink confides in King Trent, who decides to remove Bink from harm's way by sending him out on a mission to find the source of magic of Xanth. To help him, King Trent sends Chester the Centaur and the soldier Crombie. Crombie is turned into a griffin by King Trent, whose magical talent is the ability to transform living things.

First, the party heads to the Good Magician Humfrey's castle, to ask his advice about their quest. When they tell him they are attempting to discover Xanth's source of magic, Humfrey decides he wants to come as well. They come across Beauregard the Demon who tells them they should abandon their quest, as it could result in the destruction of all magic in Xanth. At this time they also find Grundy the Golem, whose talent is understanding any language. This is particularly useful because Crombie in griffin form can only speak in squawks, which Grundy is able to translate.

On their quest, they meet many obstacles, including a Siren, a Gorgon whose face turns men to stone, madness itself, a dragon, tangle trees, and an ogre. Bink narrowly escapes all enemies through a series of seemingly circumstantial events, due to his talent. Eventually they find the source of magic - a demon named X(A/N)^{th} imprisoned deep below the surface. Bink is faced with a moral dilemma, to let it be free and destroy all magic in Xanth and act against the Brain Coral, or to keep it against its will. He eventually lets the magic go by freeing the demon, but is convinced by Cherie Centaur to go back and look for the demon again, hoping to convince it to stay. After some negotiation, the demon agrees under the condition that the magic shield which separated Xanth from Mundania will protect him from foolish intruders.

Upon Bink's return home, he discovers his son Dor possesses a magician caliber talent - he can talk to inanimate objects.

== Characters ==
- Bink
- Humfrey
- Crombie
- Grundy
- Chester
