= Xanth =

Series of fantasy novels by Piers Anthony

The Magic of Xanth
- Author: Piers Anthony
- Language: English
- Genre: Fantasy
- Publisher: Del Rey Books (1977–1986); HarperCollins (1987–1993); Tor Books (1993–2013); Open Road (2014–Present)
- Published: 1977–2026
- Media type: Print (Paperback / Hardcover)
- No. of books: 49

Xanth
- First appearance: A Spell for Chameleon (1977)
- Last appearance: Knickelpede Knight
- Created by: Piers Anthony
- Genre: Fantasy

In-universe information
- Type: Fantasy world
- Ruled by: King of Xanth
- Races: Elves, centaurs, demons, dragons, fauns, gargoyles, goblins, golems, harpies, merfolk, naga, nymphs, ogres, zombies
- Characters: Bink, Chameleon, Trent, Iris, Dor, Irene, Ivy, Grundy Golem, Smash Ogre, Tandy Nymph, Demoness Metria, The "Good Magician" Humfrey

Xanth (/ˈzænθ/ ZANTH), also known as The Magic of Xanth, is a series of fantasy novels by author Piers Anthony. The novels are set in the fantasy world of Xanth, a peninsula on which magic exists and every human has a magical talent. The books have been noted for their extensive use of wordplay and puns.

Anthony has stated that he has kept the series going as long as he has (currently 49 books) because the Xanth novels are "just about all that publishers want" from him.

Since the peak of its popularity in the 1970s and 1980s, the series has been criticized by many scholars and reviewers for what they characterize as misogynist and pedophilic undertones; one reviewer has called it the "most divisive non-media publishing enterprise in all of fantasy". Anthony has downplayed these critiques.

The series was optioned in 2017 for a film and TV series.

== Setting ==
=== Inhabitants and talents ===
Each human character in Xanth is born with a unique magical ability, called a talent. With the exception of the curse fiends, the winged centaurs, and the child Surprise Golem (Daughter of Rapunzel and Grundy Golem), these abilities never repeat exactly in individuals throughout the entire history of Xanth (although nearly identical talents show up on occasion). Though many talents are limited in scope (called the "spot-on-a-wall" variety), the series focuses mainly on individuals with "Magician" caliber abilities (one of the criteria for serving as King of Xanth).

In addition to the human characters, Xanth is populated by elves, centaurs, demons, dragons, fauns, gargoyles, goblins, golems, harpies, merfolk, naga, nymphs, ogres, rocs, zombies, curse fiends and other fictional beasts. Though initially introduced as obstacles to the human characters, some individuals from those groups become main characters in later books of the series.

As the series progresses, some of the half-human species are discovered to have the potential to possess magical talents. The centaurs of the primary centaur community, Centaur Isle, exile any centaurs who demonstrate a magical talent (although some centaur communities are more lenient about possession of talent); however, they tolerate talents in "lesser" races such as humans. Goblins and harpies are shown to have the potential to possess half-talents, the complementary half existing in a member of the other species, (i.e., a goblin must team with a harpy for them to utilize their talent); the hostility between goblins and harpies proved a major obstacle to any serious effort by them to work together to develop these potential talents. Other non-human species are also known to possess talents, for example: Sesame Serpent and Claire Voyant. Visitors from other dimensions with talents retain their talents after arriving in Xanth.

A common feature in most of the novels is that the "Good Magician" Humfrey, whose magical ability is "information", agrees to answer one question from the story's protagonist in return for one year of service, which is tied into the motivation for the character's quest.

=== Geography ===
Geographically, modern Xanth resembles the state of Florida in the United States in shape, but has landmarks that mimic well-known geographical features from around the world. One major example of this is the Gap Chasm, an enormous canyon a mile wide which completely bisects the country, paralleling the DMZ of the Korean Peninsula. The position of the Chasm could also correspond with the Cross Florida Barge Canal, which, similar to the chasm, is generally forgotten except for those who stumble upon it. The Gap is guarded by a resident dragon, known as Stanley Steamer, and is crossed by means of treacherous bridges. Many of Xanth's other geographical features are puns on those of Florida (for example, Lake Ogre-Chobee and the Kiss-Mee River). The Florida Keys also exist, though they are, in Xanth, actual keys. Other punning feature names include the Isle of View ("I love you") and Mount Ever-Rest (Mount Everest). The moon is close enough that flying creatures may land there; the back side is sweet and honeyish, the visible side has turned sour and become curdled cheese, due to observing what has happened on Earth and Xanth. Plants may bear fruit of all descriptions (pie trees and shoe trees are common) or they may be carnivorous (such as the tangle trees), making travel in Xanth risky.

Xanth has a connection with the normal world, which is referred to as "Mundania"; its people are called "Mundanes". Although any citizen of Xanth can enter Mundania at any time through an isthmus in the northwest, Mundanes enter the isthmus in Xanth from random geographic locations and time periods throughout history. In other words, Xanth does not have a fixed location or time in the mundane world; and the timeline between Xanth and Mundania seems to jump backwards and forwards. For example, within the lifetime of a normal citizen of Xanth, an American Mundane from 2026 and an Egyptian Mundane from 3000 BC could both walk across the isthmus. However, Mundanes seem to have trouble finding Xanth on a consistent basis, making any travel to Xanth a somewhat rare occurrence. Despite these seeming difficulties, Xanth was colonized in several waves by groups of invaders and nomads from Mundania over the course of several centuries.

=== Adult Conspiracy ===
First mentioned in Crewel Lye, the Adult Conspiracy is one of the prominent features of the Xanth world. In an interview with Moira Allen, Piers Anthony referred to the "Adult conspiracy to keep interesting things from children" as a literary device "parodying current societal conventions". Nearly all subsequent books contain references to the Conspiracy and its effects, particularly those novels in which the main characters are children.

At its core, the Adult Conspiracy seeks to protect children from knowledge that could bring them to great harm. The precise age for entering into the world of adults is age 18, corresponding to the age of majority in most places. The primary principle that inducts children into the Conspiracy is the understanding of the secret of "summoning the stork". In Xanthian terms, "summoning the stork" literally means to put out a call to summon a stork which will deliver to the couple a child. In Isle of View, it is revealed that summoning the stork will release an "ellipsis" (...) into the air to fly off to the stork. This is a play on the joke that all the "adult" things happen after a paragraph ends in an ellipsis. Most inductees actually discover the specifics of the act "by accident" after marriage, or under the influence of a love spring (a magical spring which causes two drinkers, not necessarily human, or even of the same species, to fall madly, and lustfully, in love with one another at first sight).

Other faculties of the Adult Conspiracy include:

- Censorship of foul language – All foul words contain the ability to cause various effects (the wilting of plants (negative), removal of curse burrs (positive), etc.). These are automatically bleeped when said in the presence of someone who has yet to be inducted.
- Visual access to underwear – Because underwear is so closely tied to sexuality (even more so than nudity in Xanth), men become automatically "freaked out" when they view panties. This is made a common joke, most prominently in the novel The Color of Her Panties, and is often used by women to gain advantage over men. Panties only carry their effects when worn, but because of their nature, they are forbidden to be shown to children.
- Inability to have childish fun – Children believe that once they join the Adult Conspiracy, they will no longer have pillow fights, eat sweets and drink "tsoda popka" (soda pop), or want to have fun. While this belief is exaggerated, the entry to the Conspiracy does cause the couple to lose their bed monster, inadvertently creating the appearance of losing all childhood spirit under the responsibility of Adulthood.

There have been occasions when children gained access to the Adult Conspiracy prematurely. Jenny Elf, Che Centaur, and Gwenny Goblin had to be given access to the Adult Conspiracy when Gwenny received a pair of contact lenses that corrected her poor eyesight while giving her the ability to see others' dreams (some of which could contain Conspiracy material). In one rare instance, a little girl was born with the magic talent of immunity to the magical censorship of Adult Conspiracy, causing her family much distress. This was remedied with magician Sherlock's talent of reversal and a vial of lethe water which erased her memory.

== Novels ==
As of 2026, there are 49 published novels.

No.	Title	Publisher	Date	ISBN
1	A Spell for Chameleon	Del Rey Books	September 1977	0-345-25855-X
2	The Source of Magic	Del Rey Books	February 1979	0-345-27284-6
3	Castle Roogna	Del Rey Books	July 1979	0-345-27925-5
4	Centaur Aisle	Del Rey Books	December 1981	0-345-29770-9
5	Ogre, Ogre	Del Rey Books	October 1982	0-345-30187-0
6	Night Mare	Del Rey Books	January 1983	0-345-30456-X
7	Dragon on a Pedestal	Del Rey Books	October 1983	0-345-31107-8
8	Crewel Lye: A Caustic Yarn	Del Rey Books	January 1985	0-345-31309-7
9	Golem in the Gears	Del Rey Books	February 1986	0-345-31886-2
10	Vale of the Vole	Avon Books	October 1987	0-380-75287-5
11	Heaven Cent	Avon Books	October 1988	0-380-75288-3
12	Man from Mundania	Avon Books	October 1989	0-380-75289-1
13	Isle of View	William Morrow	October 1990	0-688-10134-8
14	Question Quest	William Morrow	October 1991	0-688-10898-9
15	The Color of Her Panties	William Morrow	September 1992	0-688-10916-0
16	Demons Don't Dream	Tor Books	February 1993	0-312-85389-0
17	Harpy Thyme	Tor Books	January 1994	0-312-85390-4
18	Geis of the Gargoyle	Tor Books	February 1995	0-312-85391-2
19	Roc and a Hard Place	Tor Books	October 1995	0-312-85392-0
20	Yon Ill Wind	Tor Books	October 1996	0-312-86227-X
21	Faun & Games	Tor Books	October 1997	0-312-86162-1
22	Zombie Lover	Tor Books	October 1998	0-312-86690-9
23	Xone of Contention	Tor Books	October 1999	0-312-86691-7
24	The Dastard	Tor Books	October 2000	0-312-86900-2
25	Swell Foop	Tor Books	October 2001	0-312-86906-1
26	Up in a Heaval	Tor Books	October 2002	0-312-86904-5
27	Cube Route	Tor Books	October 2003	0-765-30406-6
28	Currant Events	Tor Books	October 2004	0-765-30407-4
29	Pet Peeve	Tor Books	October 2005	0-7653-0408-2
30	Stork Naked	Tor Books	October 2006	0-765-30409-0
31	Air Apparent	Tor Books	October 2007	0-765-30410-4
32	Two to the Fifth	Tor Books	October 2008	978-0-7653-1935-7
33	Jumper Cable	Tor Books	October 13, 2009	978-0-7653-2351-4
34	Knot Gneiss	Tor Books	October 12, 2010	978-0-7653-2352-1
35	Well-Tempered Clavicle	Tor Books	October 11, 2011	978-1-4299-3561-6
36	Luck of the Draw	Tor Books	December 24, 2012	978-0-7653-3135-9
37	Esrever Doom	Tor Books	October 22, 2013	978-0-7653-3136-6
38	Board Stiff	Open Road	December 17, 2013	978-1-4976-5544-7
39	Five Portraits	Open Road	October 21, 2014	978-1-4976-6293-3
40	Isis Orb	Open Road	October 18, 2016	978-1-5040-3737-2
41	Ghost Writer in the Sky	Open Road	April 18, 2017	978-1-5040-3878-2
42	Fire Sail	Open Road	November 5, 2019	978-1-5040-5875-9
43	Jest Right	Open Road	July 14, 2020	978-1-5040-5997-8
44	Skeleton Key	Open Road	February 9, 2021	978-1-5040-6030-1
45	A Tryst of Fate	Open Road	October 19, 2021	978-1-5040-6681-5
46	Six Crystal Princesses	Open Road	May 31, 2022	978-1-5040-6691-4
47	Apoca Lips	Open Road	January 31, 2023	978-1-5040-6694-5
48	Three Novel Nymphs	Open Road	May 13, 2025	978-1-5040-9042-1
49	Knickelpede Knight	Open Road	May 26, 2026	978-1-5040-9681-2

== Related works ==
- Encyclopedia of Xanth (1987, by Jody Lynn Nye) a Crossroads Adventure role-playing game book
- Ghost of a Chance (1988, by Jody Lynn Nye) a Crossroads Adventure role-playing game book
- Piers Anthony's Visual Guide to Xanth (1989, with Jody Lynn Nye)
- "Xanth" Board Game (1991, created by Mayfair Games, a board game for 1-6 players set in the Xanth Universe)
- Companions of Xanth (a 1993 video game described in and following the plot of Demons Don't Dream)
- Letters to Jenny (1993, nonfiction)
