= A Spell for Chameleon =

1977 Piers Anthony fantasy novel

- First edition
- Author: Piers Anthony
- Cover artist: Michael Whelan
- Language: English
- Genre: Fantasy
- Publisher: Ballantine Books & Del Rey
- Publication date: September 1977
- Publication place: United States
- Media type: Print (hardback & paperback)
- Pages: 344 (paperback)
- ISBN: 0-345-25855-X
- OCLC: 297146272
- LC Class: CPB Box no. 2227 vol. 15
- Followed by: The Source of Magic

A Spell for Chameleon is a fantasy novel by British-American writer Piers Anthony, published in 1977 by Ballantine Books/Del Rey Books. It is the first book of the Xanth series.

== Plot introduction ==
In this adventure, Bink is exiled to Mundania because he has (inadvertently) broken Xanth law by not having a magical talent. He returns to Xanth with Chameleon, a woman whose intelligence and beauty vary inversely depending on the time of the month, and the evil magician Trent, who was exiled 20 years earlier for attempting to usurp the throne of Xanth.

== Plot summary ==
Characters of A Spell for Chameleon
| Primary character | Bink |
| Major characters | Trent; Chameleon; Iris; Humfrey; Aeolus |

Bink must discover his magical talent before he comes of age, or be exiled from Xanth. En route to see the Good Magician Humfrey about whether he has a talent, Bink runs into three different women, Wynne, Dee, and Iris, as well as Chester and Cherie Centaur, and Crombie the soldier. He finds out from Good Magician Humfrey that he has Magician-caliber magic that cannot be identified.

Because his talent cannot be discovered, Bink is exiled to Mundania, the land of no magic. While there, he is captured by the Evil Magician Trent, who was exiled 20 years before for attempting to overthrow the current king. Trent is trying to invade Xanth with his Mundane army to usurp the throne but has been consistently prevented from entering by the magic barrier which surrounds Xanth. He believes that Bink can help him get into Xanth by providing information on the location of the source of the barrier, and attempts to coerce Bink into revealing this information. Trent has prepared an elixir that can temporarily nullify magic and has a catapult that can hurl this elixir into the land of Xanth. All that Trent needs now are the exact coordinates of the shield-stone. Bink refuses to cooperate and is thrown into a pit with Fanchon, a woman from Xanth that has followed him there. Bink and Fanchon escape to sea but are pursued by Trent's forces. Eventually, Bink, Trent, and Fanchon are all swept into Xanth via a whirlpool. However, Trent's forces are left behind.

The trio decides to declare a truce until they can make their way out of the wilderness. While travelling, they discover Castle Roogna, which was built 800 years before by one of the early Kings of Xanth but abandoned 400 years later. Here, Bink learns that Fanchon, Wynne, and Dee are all the same person named Chameleon. Castle Roogna is haunted by relatively benign ghosts and zombies and is an area of heightened magical power. The castle in fact seems to possess some form of awareness and had actually used its control of the surrounding area to herd the trio onto its grounds. It detected the presence of two magician-caliber talents in the group (Bink and Trent) and lured them there in the hopes that one of them could become king and restore the castle to its former glory. The group leaves Castle Roogna to the see the King but are eventually forced to break their truce when Bink refuses to join Trent in taking over Xanth. While they are arguing, Iris of illusion shows up and offers to marry Trent and help him become King. Iris craves power, but as a woman she is barred from ruling Xanth and has decided that the next best thing is to marry a King. Trent and Bink agree to a duel to the death or surrender: If Bink loses then he will stay out of Trent's way, but if he wins then Trent will cease his efforts to gain the throne. In the course of this duel Trent deduces Bink's talent: he cannot be harmed by magic. Because Bink is still vulnerable to non-magical harm his talent has gone to great lengths to conceal itself over the years; where Bink could have been harmed by magic he has always been saved by what appears to be coincidences. Because of interference from Iris, Trent declares that the duel must be restarted, but now thanks to his knowledge of Bink's talent, Trent has the upper hand. He is about to kill Bink when Chameleon dives in front of the sword. Trent and Bink then call a truce to obtain healing elixir to save her life. Bink eventually gets to the Good Magician's Castle in the form of a bird, having been transformed by Trent.

Not only does Bink get the elixir, but also finds out that the Storm King has died. All the officials of Xanth, including the Council of Elders (which includes Bink's father Roland), arrive on the scene. The Council captures Trent, heals Chameleon, and offers Trent the kingship if he will marry Iris. The Storm King was allowed to remain King well past his prime because there was no suitable successor and by forcing Trent to marry (and presumably produce magician-caliber offspring) the council hopes to prevent that state of affairs from occurring again. Trent's first act as King is to get rid of the barrier between Xanth and Mundania and grant Bink (and non-magical folk in general including mundanes) the right to stay in Xanth. Trent's forces, who consisted of mundanes who wished to immigrate to Xanth, begin to settle in the magical land. Bink and Chameleon are then married and Trent and Iris take up residence in Castle Roogna. Bink and Chameleon obtain a cottage just outside the Castle and Bink is given the title of Official Researcher of Xanth.

== Critical reception ==
Spell won the 1978 British Fantasy Award for Best Novel.

In a dual review for NPR in 2013, married couple Melissa De La Cruz and Michael Johnston called Spell "risky and thrilling". Both said that reading the book as adolescents strongly affected their perceptions of sexuality and relationships, and gave them the confidence to accept themselves as they were, and believe that a potential partner would also accept them. Infinity Plus's Sue Lange stated that although the book was "written in a simple style and fairly childish", with concepts that "have not aged well", it had "a number of clever moments", as well as "delightful puns" that were "wickedly witty". Jason Heller, writing for The A.V. Club, described the book as a "sad, misogynistic fantasy" that is "little more than a bundle of leering, hateful, degrading judgments about both women and men", in which misogyny is "fundamentally integrated as a primary theme".
