= Darrell K. Sweet =

American illustrator (1934–2011)

- Born: August 15, 1934; Highland Park, New Jersey
- Died: December 5, 2011 (aged 77)
- Known for: Fantasy, science fiction, and western illustration

Darrell K. Sweet (August 15, 1934 – December 5, 2011) was a professional illustrator best known for providing cover art for science fiction and fantasy novels, in which capacity he was nominated for a Hugo Award in 1983.

== Life and career ==
Sweet was born August 15, 1934, in Highland Park, New Jersey. He graduated from Syracuse University in 1956 with a degree in fine arts.

Sweet began designing book covers for Ballantine Books in 1974. He moved to Del Rey Books in 1975, when Judy-Lynn del Rey hired him to produce the front cover for Fritz Leiber's novel Gather, Darkness!.

He was famous for providing cover art for the epic fantasy saga The Wheel of Time, save for the final book, which postdated Sweet's death. He was also the cover artist for the well-known Xanth series by Piers Anthony, the Pelbar Cycle by Paul O. Williams, the Saga of Recluce series by L. E. Modesitt, Jr., the Runelords series by David Farland, and Stephen R. Donaldson's series The Chronicles of Thomas Covenant the Unbeliever.

Between 1975 and 2005, Sweet produced over 3000 images including trading cards and calendars. He died in 2011.

== Professional recognition ==
Sweet was a guest of honor at Tuckercon in 2007, at the 2010 World Fantasy Convention in 2010, and LepreCon in 2011. In 2011, he was selected as a guest of honor for LoneStarCon 3; after his death, LoneStarCon chose to "continue to feature him in memoriam as one of our honored Guests."
