= Piers Anthony =

American writer (born 1934)

- Born: Piers Anthony Dillingham Jacob; August 6, 1934 (age 92); Oxford, England
- Education: Goddard College
- Occupations: Novelist, short story writer
- Spouses: Carol Marble (m. 1956; died 2019) MaryLee Boyance (m. 2020; died 2026)
- Children: 2
- Parent(s): Alfred Jacob and Norma Jacob
- Writing career
- Pen name: Piers Anthony
- Period: 1956–present
- Genres: Science fiction, fantasy
- Website: hipiers.net

Piers Anthony Dillingham Jacob (born August 6, 1934) is an American author in the science fiction and fantasy genres, publishing under the name Piers Anthony. He is best known for his long-running Xanth novel series, set in the fictional realm of Xanth.

Many of Piers Anthony's books have appeared on The New York Times Best Seller list. He considers one of his greatest achievements to have been publishing a book beginning with every letter of the alphabet, from A (Anthonology) to Z (Zombie Lover).

== Early life ==
Anthony's parents, Alfred and Norma Jacob, were Quaker pacifists studying at Oxford University who interrupted their studies in 1936 to undertake relief work on behalf of the Quakers during the Spanish Civil War, establishing a food kitchen for children in Barcelona. Piers and his sister were left in England in the care of their maternal grandparents and a nanny. Alfred Jacob, although a British citizen, had been born in America near Philadelphia, and in 1940, after being forced out of Spain and with the situation in Britain deteriorating, the family sailed to the United States. In 1941 the family settled in a rustic "back to the land" utopian community near Winhall, Vermont, where a young Piers made the acquaintance of radical author Scott Nearing, a neighbor. Both parents resumed their academic studies, and Alfred eventually became a professor of Romance languages, teaching at a number of colleges in the Philadelphia area.

Piers was moved around to a number of schools, eventually enrolling in Goddard College in Vermont where he graduated in 1956. On This American Life on July 27, 2012, Anthony revealed that his parents had divorced, he was bullied, and he had poor grades in school. Anthony referred to his high school as a "very fancy private school", and refuses to donate money to it. He recalls being part of "the lower crust", and that no one paid attention to, or cared about him. He said, "I didn't like being a member of the underclass, of the peons like that".

== Marriage and early career ==
Anthony met his future wife, Carol Marble, while both were attending college. They were married in 1956, the same year he graduated from Goddard College, and he subsequently worked as a handyman. In 1957, Anthony decided to join the United States Army, as his wife was pregnant and they needed both medical coverage and a steady source of income. During his two-year enlistment, he became a naturalized U.S. citizen in 1958 and was editor and cartoonist for his battalion's newspaper.

After completing military service, he briefly taught at Admiral Farragut Academy in St. Petersburg, Florida before deciding to try to become a full-time writer.

Anthony and his wife made a deal: if he could sell a piece of writing within one year, she would continue to work to support him. But if he could not sell anything in that year, then he would forever give up his dream of being a writer. At the end of the year, he managed to get a short story published. He credits his wife as the person who made his writing career possible, and he advises aspiring writers that they need to have a source of income other than their writing in order to get through the early years of a writing career.

== Writing ==
On multiple occasions Anthony has moved from one publisher to another, taking a popular series with him, when he says he felt the editors were unduly tampering with his work. Anthony maintains an Internet Publishers Survey in the interest of helping aspiring writers. For this service, he won the 2003 "Friend of EPIC" award for service to the electronic publishing community. His website won the Special Recognition for Service to Writers award from Preditors and Editors, an author's guide to publishers and writing services.

His popular novel series Xanth inspired the MS-DOS video game Companions of Xanth, by Legend Entertainment. The same series also spawned the board game Xanth by Mayfair Games.

Anthony's novels usually end with a chapter-long Author's Note, in which he talks about himself, his life, and his experiences as they related to the process of writing the novel. He often discusses correspondence with readers and any real-world issues that influenced the novel.

Since about 2000, Anthony has written his novels in a Linux environment.

Anthony's Xanth series was ranked No. 99 in a 2011 NPR readers' poll of best science fiction and fantasy books.

== In other media ==
Act One of episode 470 of the radio program This American Life is an account of boyhood obsessions with Piers Anthony. The act is written and narrated by writer Logan Hill who, as a 12-year-old, was consumed with reading Anthony's novels. For a decade he felt he must have been Anthony's number one fan, until, when he was 22, he met "Andy" at a wedding and discovered their mutual interest in the writer. Andy is interviewed for the story and explains that, as a teenager, he had used escapist novels in order to cope with his alienating school and home life in Buffalo, New York. In 1987, at age 15, he decided to run away to Florida in order to try to live with Piers Anthony. The story includes Anthony's reflections on these events.

== But What of Earth? ==
Early in Anthony's literary career, there was a dispute surrounding the original publication (1976) of But What of Earth? Editor Roger Elwood commissioned the novel for his nascent science-fiction line Laser Books. According to Anthony, he completed But What of Earth?, and Elwood accepted and purchased it. Elwood then told Anthony that he wished to make several minor changes, and in order not to waste Anthony's time, he had hired copy editor (and author) Robert Coulson to retype the manuscript with the changes. Anthony described Coulson as a friend and was initially open to his contribution.

However, Elwood told Coulson he was to be a full collaborator, free to make revisions to Anthony's text in line with suggestions made by other copy editors. Elwood promised Coulson a 50–50 split with Anthony on all future royalties. According to Anthony, the published novel was very different from his version, with changes to characters and dialog, and with scenes added and removed. Anthony felt the changes worsened the novel. Laser's ultimate publication of But What of Earth? listed Anthony and Coulson together as collaborators. Publication rights were reverted to Anthony under threat of legal action. In 1989, Anthony (re)published his original But What of Earth? in an annotated edition through Tor Books. This edition contains an introduction and conclusion setting out the story of the novel's permutations and roughly 60 pages of notes by Anthony giving examples of changes to plot and characters, and describing some of the comments made by copy editors on his manuscript.

== Criticism ==
Some critics have called Anthony's portrayal of female characters stereotypical and misogynistic, particularly in the early parts of the Xanth series, and taken issue with themes of pedophilia and eroticism in his work. Anthony has said in interviews that these critiques do not reflect his work accurately and that he receives more fan mail from women than from men.

== Personal life ==
He and his first wife, Carol Ann Marble Jacob, had two daughters, Penelope "Penny" Carolyn and Cheryl. Penny had one child, and died in 2009 of complications from skin cancer. Carol Ann died at home on October 3, 2019, from what is believed to have been heart-related complications related to a 15-year-long battle with chronic inflammatory demyelinating polyneuropathy (CIDP).

On April 22, 2020, he married MaryLee Boyance. Anthony lived on a tree farm in Florida until March 2023, when he sold the farm and moved to California. MaryLee died on January 8, 2026.

Anthony is a vegetarian.

=== Religious beliefs ===
Regarding his religious beliefs, Anthony wrote in the October 2004 entry of his personal website, "I'm agnostic, which means I regard the case as unproven, but I'm much closer to the atheist position than to the theist one." In 2017 he stated, "I am more certain about God and the Afterlife: they don't exist."
