= The Color of Her Panties =

1992 novel by Piers Anthony

- First edition
- Author: Piers Anthony
- Cover artist: Darrell K. Sweet
- Language: English
- Series: Xanth series
- Genre: Fantasy
- Publisher: William Morrow
- Publication date: September 1992
- Publication place: United States
- Media type: Print
- Pages: 334
- ISBN: 0-688-10916-0
- OCLC: 26468191
- Preceded by: Question Quest
- Followed by: Demons Don't Dream

The Color of Her Panties is a fantasy novel by British-American writer Piers Anthony, the fifteenth book of the Xanth series.

== Plot introduction ==
Mela Merwoman, one of the protagonists of The Color of Her Panties, was introduced in Heaven Cent attempting to trick Prince Dolph into marrying her. Still desperate for a husband, Mela goes to ask the Good Magician Humfrey to find her a suitable mate. On the way, she joins forces with a civilized ogre named Okra and a positive young woman named Ida, who bears a striking resemblance to Princess Ivy.

Meanwhile, adolescent Gwenny Goblin, Che Centaur and Jenny Elf are trying to help Gwenny beat out her half-brother Gobble for chiefship of the goblin horde.

== Plot summary ==
Mela, like all merpeople, is able to turn into a full human so that she can walk on land. To follow "landbound custom", she finds clothing and shoes (conveniently growing on trees, as is common on Xanth). Of particular concern is which panties to choose: after all, there is significant interest in the color of her panties. After trying on dozens of pairs, Mela finally decides on plaid (the color she would choose was the subject of an Impossible Question that the Demon X(A/N)th asked the Good Magician Humfrey in Question Quest).

Gwenny has to prove her courage to become leader of Goblin Mountain. Her task is to steal an egg from the Roc's nest. The two storylines are brought together when Mela has to help save Gwenny from a Roc and a hard place.
