= Vale of the Vole =

1987 novel by Piers Anthony

- First edition
- Author: Piers Anthony
- Cover artist: Darrell K. Sweet
- Language: English
- Genre: Fantasy
- Published: 1987 (Avon Books)
- Publication place: United States
- Media type: Print (Paperback)
- Pages: 324 (paperback 1st printing)
- ISBN: 978-0-380-75287-4
- OCLC: 16743676
- Preceded by: Golem in the Gears
- Followed by: Heaven Cent

Vale of the Vole is a fantasy novel by American writer Piers Anthony, the tenth book of the Xanth series. It begins a trilogy including Heaven Cent and Man from Mundania. The novel was written as a satirical jab at the canalization of the Kissimmee River in Anthony's native state of Florida as a result of the effects of the 1947 Atlantic hurricane season.

The protagonist of this story is Eskil "Esk" Ogre, only son of Tandy Nymph and Smash Ogre. His talent is to protest; when Esk says "No!" he really means it. Those he directs this talent at literally stop what they have intended to do. Esk goes to ask Good Magician Humfrey how to get rid of the Demoness Metria, who has seemingly threatened his family. Unfortunately, Humfrey has gone missing.

== Plot summary ==
On his way to the Good Magician's castle, Esk meets Chex, the winged centaur daughter of Xap Hippogryph and Chem Centaur. Despite having wings, Chex is unable to fly due to her solid equine weight; she is going to ask Humfrey how she can fly. Later, the two of them meet up with Volney Vole. Volney has a demon problem of his own, as his home by the Kiss-Me River has become unbearably infested with bugs ever since the demons decided to straighten out the river's undulating curves.

When they discover the Good Magician is missing, they decide to look for him. On the way, they go through a Hypnogourd, where bad dreams are manufactured. Esk meets Bria Brassie, a heavy brass woman, and they fall in love. The team discovers that Chex can make items temporarily light when she flicks them with her tail, which provides a solution to her problem of how to fly.

== Characters ==
- Eskil
- Volney
- Chex
- Bria
- Metria
