= 1947 Florida–Georgia hurricane =

Category 2 Atlantic hurricane in 1947

Hurricane Nine (King)
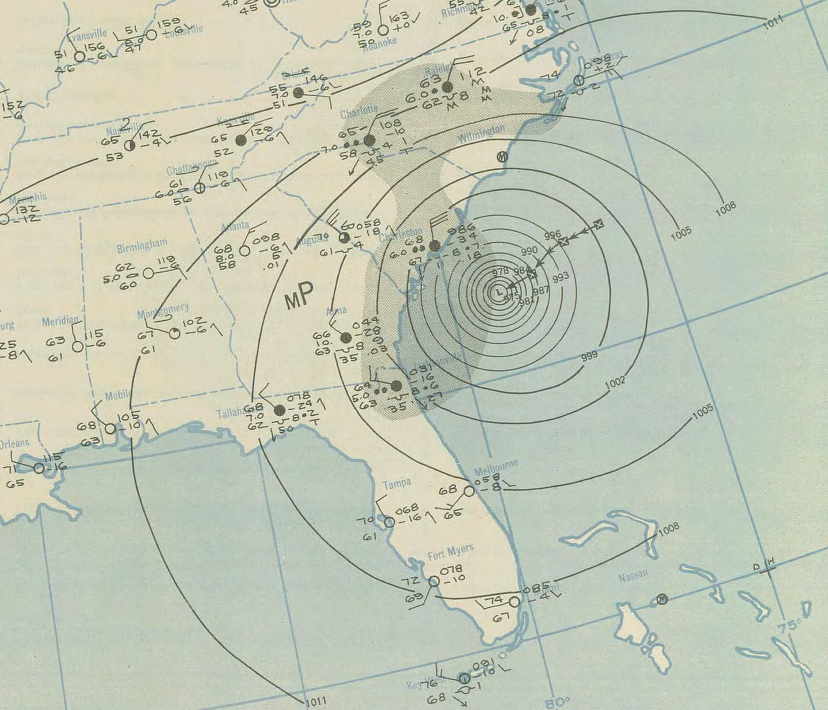
- Surface weather analysis of the hurricane nearing Georgia on October 15

Meteorological history
- Formed: October 9, 1947
- Dissipated: October 16, 1947

Category 2 hurricane
- 1-minute sustained (SSHWS/NWS)
- Highest winds: 105 mph (165 km/h)
- Lowest pressure: 965 mbar (hPa); 28.50 inHg (estimated)

Overall effects
- Fatalities: 1 direct
- Damage: $3.26 million (1947 USD) ($47 million in 2025 USD)
- Areas affected: Cuba; Florida; The Bahamas; Georgia; South Carolina
- IBTrACS
- Part of the 1947 Atlantic hurricane season

The 1947 Florida–Georgia hurricane (Air Weather Service designation: King (Note: Starting in 1947 the United States Weather Bureau office in Miami, in conjunction with the military, informally applied the Joint Army/Navy Phonetic Alphabet to Atlantic tropical cyclones; the first storm to be so designated in public advisories was Hurricane Fox in 1950.)) was a moderate hurricane that caused catastrophic flooding in South Florida and the Everglades in mid-October 1947. The ninth tropical storm and fourth hurricane of the 1947 Atlantic hurricane season, it first developed on October 9 in the southern Caribbean Sea and hence moved north by west until a few days later it struck western Cuba. The cyclone then turned sharply to the northeast, accelerated, and strengthened to a hurricane, within 30 hours crossing the southern Florida peninsula. Across South Florida, the storm produced widespread rainfall of up to 15 inches (380 mm) and severe flooding, among the worst ever recorded in the area, that led to efforts by the United States Congress to improve drainage in the region.

Once over the Atlantic Ocean on October 13, the storm made history when it was the first to be targeted for modification by government and private agencies; dry ice was spread by airplanes throughout the storm in an unsuccessful effort to weaken the hurricane, though changes in the track were initially blamed upon the experiment. On the same day as that of the seeding, the cyclone slowed dramatically and turned westward, making landfall on the morning of October 15 south of Savannah, Georgia. Across the U.S. states of Georgia and South Carolina, the small hurricane produced tides up to 12 feet (3.7 m) and significant damage to 1,500 structures, but the death toll was limited to one person. The system dissipated the next day over Alabama, having caused $3.26 million in losses along its path. (Note: All damage totals are in 1947 United States dollars unless otherwise noted.)

== Meteorological history ==
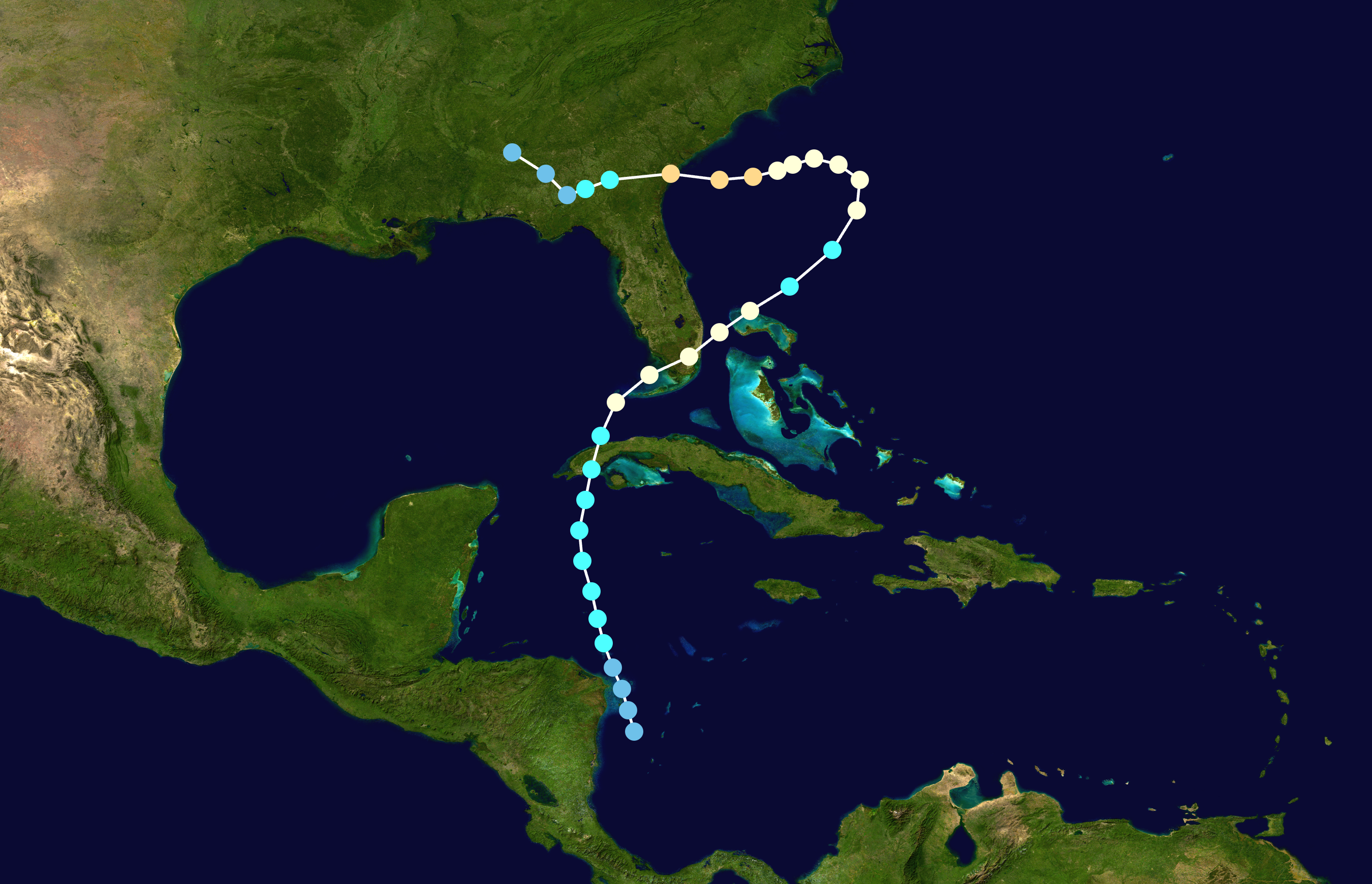
Map plotting the storm's track and intensity, according to the Saffir–Simpson scale Map key Saffir–Simpson scale Tropical depression (≤38 mph, ≤62 km/h) Tropical storm (39–73 mph, 63–118 km/h) Category 1 (74–95 mph, 119–153 km/h) Category 2 (96–110 mph, 154–177 km/h) Category 3 (111–129 mph, 178–208 km/h) Category 4 (130–156 mph, 209–251 km/h) Category 5 (≥157 mph, ≥252 km/h) Unknown Storm type Tropical cyclone Subtropical cyclone Extratropical cyclone, remnant low, tropical disturbance, or monsoon depression

At 18:00 UTC on October 8, a tropical depression developed in the Intertropical Convergence Zone about 65 miles (105 km) west-northwest of Isla de Providencia, Colombia, near 13.5°N 82.3°W. Moving generally west of due north, the depression gradually strengthened, becoming a tropical storm a day later. At 15:30 UTC on October 10, the Hurricane Hunters—reconnaissance aircraft—first intercepted the storm, registering a pressure of 1,000 mb (30 inHg), which suggested maximum sustained winds of 54 mph (87 km/h). Afterward, the storm began curving east of due north, while nearing the island of Cuba. At 07:00 UTC October 11, the deepening tropical cyclone made landfall near La Coloma, Pinar del Río Province, with winds of 65 mph (100 km/h). After crossing the western portion of the island, the cyclone underwent robust intensification over the southeastern Gulf of Mexico, with most of its strengthening occurring in under four hours. At 17:16 UTC aircraft entered the eye of the storm and measured a pressure of 983 mb (29.0 inHg), which corresponded to winds of 85 mph (140 km/h), making the storm equivalent to a Category 1 hurricane on the present-day Saffir–Simpson scale. The cyclone then angled sharply northeastward, passing near the Dry Tortugas en route to peninsular Florida. At 02:00 UTC on October 12, the hurricane impacted Southwest Florida north of Cape Sable with a slightly stronger intensity of 975 mb (28.8 inHg), along with winds of 90 mph (150 km/h); the estimated pressure was based on a barometric reading, reportedly "'still falling'", of 29.00 inHg (982 mb) taken on the edge of the eye at 07:00 UTC in Fort Lauderdale. Then a smaller-than-average storm, it crossed the mostly uninhabited Everglades and passed over the Miami metropolitan area between Fort Lauderdale and Pompano Beach. (Note: Prior to reanalysis by the National Oceanic and Atmospheric Administration (NOAA) in 2012, HURDAT indicated that the storm intensified once over South Florida, a phenomenon observed in Tropical Storm Fay (2008), which struck the same region.)

Shortly before 08:00 UTC it entered the Atlantic Ocean near Hillsboro Inlet Light, which experienced the center of a hurricane for the second time in a month, with winds of 80 mph (130 km/h). After leaving South Florida, the hurricane passed north of the Bahamas while gradually weakening. By 00:00 UTC on October 13, the cyclone degenerated into a strong tropical storm, but regained hurricane status 12 hours later. Over the next day, the storm slowed substantially and began veering landward, executing a semicircular turn northward and westward, a trajectory that threatened the Southeastern United States. During the night of October 13–14 a dearth of in-situ observations prevented forecasters from appraising its exact location and movement. At this time reconnaissance aircraft penetrating the storm reported winds of up to 55 kn (63 mph; 102 km/h), and data from the aircraft suggested the ill-defined center "split in two". (Note: Note, however, that reconnaissance-derived estimates of wind speed are considered unreliable prior to the mid-1970s, if not more than a decade later.) The secondary center meandered westward and became dominant on October 14, while slowly consolidating and intensifying. Late that day aircraft reported peak winds of 80 kn (92 mph; 150 km/h) in the storm. At 00:00 UTC on October 15, the cyclone intensified into the equivalent of a low-end Category 2 hurricane, and began accelerating westward toward Georgia. Six hours later it attained its peak of 105 mph (165 km/h), which it maintained until landfall around 11:00 UTC near Ossabaw Island, approximately 15 mi (24 km) south of Savannah. The lowest pressure in the eye at landfall was estimated to have been near 965 mb (28.5 inHg), based in part on a report from a ship just offshore more than eight hours earlier. At the time, the coverage of hurricane-force winds was small, extending about 20 miles (32 km) in all directions from the eye. The storm weakened rapidly as it crossed inland over Georgia, and by 00:00 UTC on October 16 it weakened to a tropical storm, dissipating 18 hours later over Alabama.

== Preparations ==
On October 10, watercraft in the Straits of Florida, the northwestern Caribbean, and the Yucatán Channel were advised to proceed cautiously. The steamship Florida, bound for Havana, was forced to discontinue its excursion. The next day tropical storm warnings were posted between Fort Myers and Miami, Florida. By 19:00 UTC, the United States Weather Bureau issued hurricane warnings between Punta Gorda and Key West. On October 12, warnings were extended from the Miami metropolitan area to Vero Beach. A pair of 75-car trains were dispatched to evacuate the Lake Okeechobee area. Airline traffic out of Jacksonville was halted, and several hundred vessels sought shelter in the Miami River. Owing to short notice of the storm, only an estimated 10% of businesses in Miami had erected shutters.

== Impact ==
=== Cuba and Florida ===
In Cuba, the cyclone generated gust of up to 57 mph (92 km/h) at Batista Field, near Havana.

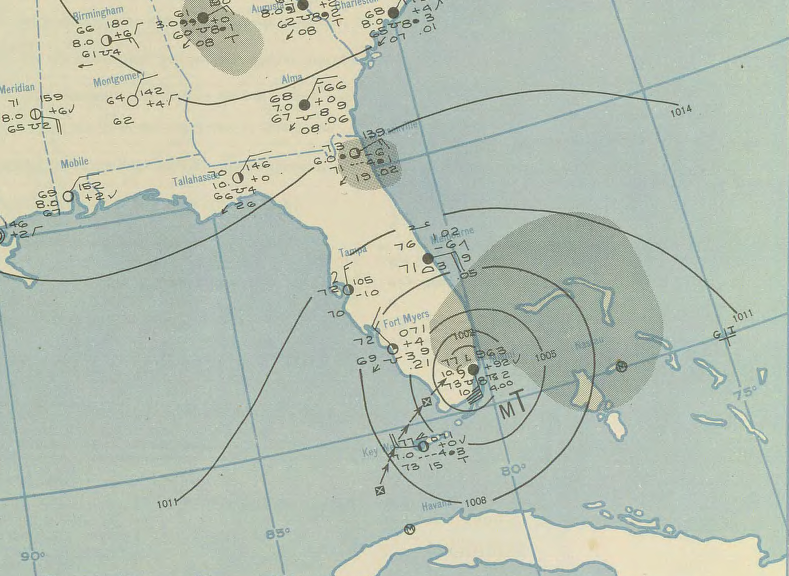
Surface weather analysis of the storm over South Florida on October 12

Upon striking southernmost Florida, the cyclone only produced $75,000 in wind-related losses, largely due to its having struck an area hit by the more powerful September hurricane. Peak winds in Florida were unofficially estimated to have reached 95 mph (153 km/h) around Cape Sable, the area where the storm made landfall. At the Dry Tortugas, wind instruments reported readings up to 84 mph (135 km/h) before failing due to "'friction from lack of oil'"; higher winds, unofficially estimated to have reached 150 mph (240 km/h), were believed to have occurred thereafter. An elevated anemometer at the Dry Tortugas Light, on Loggerhead Key, measured gusts of 125 to 140 mph (201 to 225 km/h) prior to its destruction. (Note: The Saffir–Simpson scale uses an elevation of 10 m (33 ft) above mean sea level.) An observer at Fort Jefferson reported that the winds lofted small pine trees. Elsewhere in South Florida, the U.S. Weather Bureau Air Station at Miami International Airport reported sustained winds of 80 mph (130 km/h), while the Weather Bureau Office in downtown Miami recorded peak winds of 62 mph (100 km/h). In the 7-mile (11 km) distance between the two stations, atmospheric pressure varied 3 mb (0.089 inHg), but the lowest pressure was not below 995.3 mb (29.39 inHg).

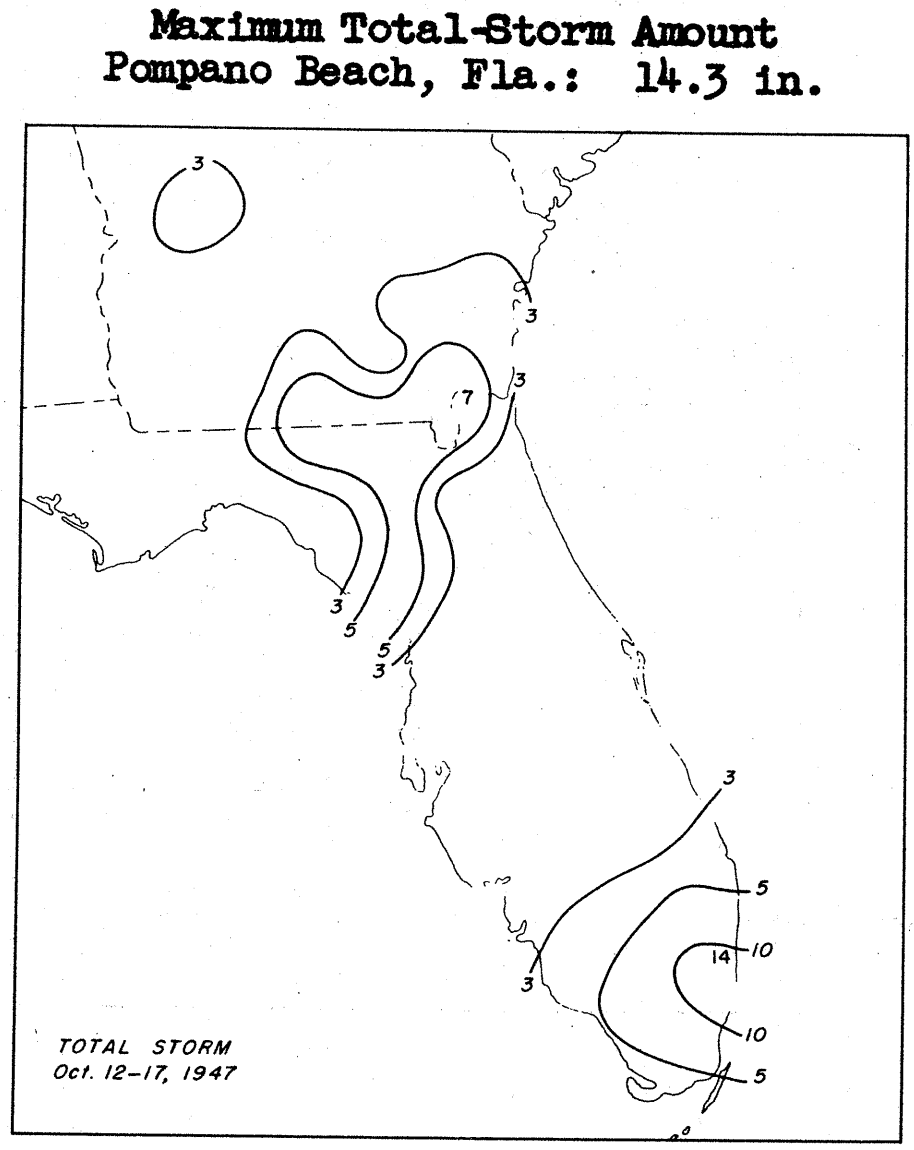
Total rainfall from the storm in Florida

Region-wide, the hurricane produced significant rainfall totals of 5 inches (130 mm) to 12 in (300 mm)—and, in the interior, locally as high as 15 in (380 mm)—causing severe flooding. The highest measured rainfall total in 24 hours in South Florida was 14.2 in (360 mm) in northeastern Broward County. On the morning of October 12 the Weather Bureau office in Miami measured 3.77 in (96 mm) in just a few hours, most of which fell in 20 minutes, eclipsing the previous daily record of 1.18 in (30 mm). The deluge submerged stores and flooded hundreds of vehicles in Downtown Miami, rendering streets "virtual canals". At a weather observation site in Hialeah, 1.32 in (34 mm) of rain fell in as little as 10 minutes. In all, as much as 6 in (150 mm) fell in just 1¼ hour in the city; due to saturated ground preceding the arrival of the storm, much of the area flooded easily, leaving parts of the city submerged under 6 feet (1.8 m) of water. Similarly, "waist deep" depths were reported in nearby Miami Springs, Opa-locka, rural western sections of Pompano Beach, and many other cities of the Miami metropolitan area. In Boca Raton, homes in the historic Old Floresta district that housed Army Air Field soldiers were flooded in up to 8 in (200 mm) of water. In the wake of the flooding in his city, Hialeah City Mayor Henry Milander blocked access from surrounding cities. In the Miami area, the Little River and the Seybold Canal overflowed, as did the New River once again in Fort Lauderdale, which had previously done so during the September hurricane. During the storm, up to 11 in (280 mm) of rain in three hours were reported to have fallen on the city of Fort Lauderdale, and sections of Broward County were under 8 ft (2.4 m) of water. Floodwaters inundated the Tamiami Trail between the Miami metropolitan area and Everglades City. Due to the floods, septic tanks overflowed, leaving canal banks and patches of ground isolated by floodwaters; reportedly, U.S. Route 1, locally called Federal Highway and built largely upon the Atlantic coastal ridge—the highest elevation in South Florida—was flooded out between Miami and Fort Lauderdale. Having been isolated by the floods, deer, rattlesnakes, and other wildlife, along with horses and cattle, sought shelter upon the remaining exposed ground, particularly levee banks.

The flooding that resulted from the storm and the earlier September hurricane was among the worst ever recorded in South Florida and became known as the "Flood of 1947" or, as the South Florida Sun-Sentinel newspaper in 1990 called it, "the Great South Florida Flood." The rains from the storms followed an abnormally wet rainy season in the spring of 1947 that raised the water table to dangerous levels and by July forced several emergency meetings by the Everglades Drainage District (EDD) to address widespread flooding. Despite the measures, which resulted in the opening of floodgates to relieve flooded farmlands by diverting water through back-pumping to Lake Okeechobee, lack of funding hampered efforts by EDD Chief Engineer Lamar Johnson to address the situation. After the October hurricane struck Florida, eleven counties extending south from Osceola County were at least 50% flooded—roughly 90% of the land mass from Orlando to the Florida Keys. South of Lake Okeechobee, a 20-to-40-mile-wide (32 to 64 km), 1/2-to-10-foot-deep (0.15 to 3.05 m) sheet of standing water inundated much of the region, including the Everglades. In the region, 5,000,000 acres (2,000,000 ha; 7,800 mi^{2}; 20,000 km^{2}) of land were flooded as abnormally high coastal tides prevented water from being released through canals to the Atlantic Ocean. The flooding divided many communities: near Fort Lauderdale, a temporary dam that had been erected by the U.S. Army Corps of Engineers to protect Davie—a town in which 90% of the homes by the end of October were at least partially submerged—lowered waters in some areas but merely diverted them to others, flooding a neighborhood and leading to angry complaints by residents; the situation worsened after the October hurricane produced even more rain over flooded South Florida.

The storm also generated many tornadoes in South Florida. One of the twisters downed trees and damaged a home at Redlands. Another, estimated to have been an F2, unroofed a pair of homes in Miami.

=== Georgia and South Carolina ===
Upon making landfall, the storm produced high tides of up to 12 ft (3.7 m) at Parris Island, South Carolina, and 9 ft (2.7 m) at Charleston, South Carolina. Up to 1,500 or more buildings were significantly damaged due to wind gusts that reached 95 mph (153 km/h) at Savannah, Georgia. One person died due to high tides preceding the storm. Total property losses in Georgia and South Carolina reached $2,185,000 (1947 USD).

== Aftermath ==
In South Florida, the flooding from the September and October hurricanes led to the creation in 1949 of what is now the South Florida Water Management District, which under a Congressional plan was entrusted with the task of preventing a recurrence of significant flooding by forming an improved flood-control system to modulate the water table and by providing suitable water levels with which to water crops, prevent saltwater intrusion, and support recreational opportunities as well as the growing South Florida communities. Large pumping systems were constructed, along with numerous new levees and canals, to mitigate the risk of large-scale flooding, yet population growth since the late 1940s is believed to have reduced the extent of vacant lands needed for effective drainage, thereby increasing the risk of damage during a flood similar to that of 1947. In his 1974 book Beyond the Fourth Generation, former EDD Chief Engineer Lamar Johnson voiced his concerns about large-scale development near the levees, which separate the Everglades water conservation areas from the Miami metropolitan area. Johnson wrote, "It is my opinion...that anytime that area gets a foot or more of rainfall overnight, the shades of 1947's flood will be with them again."

The cyclone was historically significant in that it was the first tropical cyclone to be modified as part of a multi-year operation called Project Cirrus. In July 1946, General Electric (GE) scientists concluded after experimentation that dry ice seeding could induce heavy rainfall and thus ultimately weaken storms by cooling temperatures in the eye. To undertake Project Cirrus, GE, the United States Army Signal Corps, the Office of Naval Research, and the U.S. Weather Bureau functioned jointly on research and planning. A pair of B-17s and a B-29 of the Hurricane Hunters were dispatched from MacDill Air Force Base. Early on October 13, 1947, 200 pounds (3,200 oz) of dry ice were dropped throughout the storm, then located about 350 mi (560 km) east of Jacksonville, Florida. While the appearance of the clouds changed, the initial results of the seeding were inconclusive. Shortly after the seeding took place, the hurricane turned sharply toward the Southeastern United States. While the move the leading GE scientist, Irving Langmuir, later blamed upon the seeding, subsequent examination of the environment surrounding the storm determined that a large upper-level ridge was in fact responsible for the abrupt turn, which imitated that of a hurricane in 1906.

== See also ==
- List of Florida hurricanes (1900–1949)
- 2023 Fort Lauderdale floods – Caused similarly destructive flooding in Fort Lauderdale

== Bibliography ==
- Air Weather Service (July 1948). West, W. A. (ed.). Report on the Off-Season Operations of the Air Force Hurricane Office 1947–1948 (PDF) (Technical report). Air Weather Service Technical Report. Washington, D.C. 105-37, Report on the Off-Season Operations – via Defense Technical Information Center.
- Barnes, Jay (1998). Florida's Hurricane History (1st ed.). Chapel Hill, North Carolina: UNC Press. ISBN 0-8078-2443-7 – via Internet Archive.
- Bush, David M.; Neal, William J.; Longo, Norma J.; et al. (2004). Pilkey, Orrin H.; Neal, William J. (eds.). Living with Florida's Atlantic Beaches: Coastal Hazards from Amelia Island to Key West. Living with the Shore. Durham, North Carolina: Duke University Press. ISBN 0822332892 – via Internet Archive.
- Davies, Pete (2000). Inside the Hurricane: Face to Face with Nature's Deadliest Storms. Henry Holt and Company. ISBN 0-8050-6574-1 – via Internet Archive.
- Churl, Donald W.; Johnson, John P. (1990). Boca Raton: A Pictorial History. The Donning Company Publishers. ISBN 0-89865-792-X – via Internet Archive.
- Doehring, Fred; Duedall, Iver W.; Williams, John M. (June 1994). Florida Hurricanes and Tropical Storms, 1871–1993: An Historical Survey (Technical report). Technical Paper. Gainesville, Florida: Florida Sea Grant. 71, Florida Hurricanes and Tropical Storms – via National Oceanic and Atmospheric Administration.
  - Williams, John M.; Duedall, Iver W. (2002) [1997]. Florida Hurricanes and Tropical Storms, 1871–2001 (2nd ed.). Gainesville: University Press of Florida. ISBN 0-8130-2494-3 – via Internet Archive.
- General Electric Research Laboratory (July 1952). Havens, Barrington S. (ed.). History of Project Cirrus (Technical report). General Electric Research Laboratory Report. Schenectady, New York: Research Publication Services. RL-756, Class One – via Internet Archive.
- Grady Norton (October 31, 1947). "Forecaster's Report of Hurricanes of October, 1947" (PDF). Letter to Chief, U.S. Weather Bureau. pp. 7–11.
- Grazulis, Thomas P. (November 1990). Significant Tornadoes 1880–1989. Vol. 2. St. Johnsbury, Vermont: The Tornado Project of Environmental Films. ISBN 1-879362-02-3.
  - — (July 1993). Significant Tornadoes 1680–1991: A Chronology and Analysis of Events. St. Johnsbury, Vermont: The Tornado Project of Environmental Films. ISBN 978-1879362031.
- International Best Track Archive for Climate Stewardship (IBTrACS) (September 2022). IBTrACS browser (hosted by UNC Asheville) (Report). National Centers for Environmental Information – via World Data Center for Meteorology.
- Johnson, Lamar (1974). Beyond the Fourth Generation. Gainesville: University Press of Florida. ISBN 978-0813003986 – via Internet Archive.
- Kleinberg, Eliot (2003). Black Cloud: The Deadly Hurricane of 1928. Carroll and Graf Publishing. ISBN 0-7867-1386-0 – via Internet Archive.
- Landsea, Christopher W.; Strahan-Sakoskie, Donna; Hagen, Andrew (July 2012). "A Reanalysis of the 1944–53 Atlantic Hurricane Seasons—The First Decade of Aircraft Reconnaissance" (PDF). Journal of Climate. 25 (13). Boston: American Meteorological Society: 4441–4460. Bibcode:2012JCli...25.4441H. doi:10.1175/JCLI-D-11-00419.1 – via Atlantic Oceanographic and Meteorological Laboratory.
- Ling, Sally J. (2012) [2005]. Small Town, Big Secrets: Inside the Boca Raton Army Air Field During World War II. History Press. ISBN 978-1475251944 – via Internet Archive.
- McIver, Stuart (1983). Fort Lauderdale and Broward County: An Illustrated History. Fort Lauderdale Historical Society. ISBN 978-0897810814.
- Norcross, Bryan (2007). Hurricane Almanac: The Essential Guide to Storms Past, Present, and Future (2nd ed.). St. Martin's Griffin. ISBN 978-0312371524 – via Internet Archive.
- Norton, Grady (October 1947). Written at Miami. Bennett, William J. (ed.). "General Summary". Florida section. Climatological Data. 51 (10). Washington, D.C.: United States Weather Bureau: 61.
- Schoner, R. W.; Molansky, S. (July 1956). Rainfall Associated with Hurricanes (and Other Tropical Disturbances) (Pre-printed) (Technical report). National Hurricane Research Project. Washington, D.C.: United States Weather Bureau. 3, Rainfall Associated with Hurricanes – via Weather Prediction Center.
- Simiu, Emil; Vickery, Peter; Kareem, Ahsan (July 2007). "Relation Between Saffir-Simpson Hurricane Scale Wind Speeds and Peak 3-s Gust Speeds Over Open Terrain". Journal of Structural Engineering. Technical Notes. 133 (7). Reston, Virginia: 1043–5. doi:10.1061/(ASCE)0733-9445(2007)133:7(1043).
- "Severe Local Storms for October 1947" (PDF). Monthly Weather Review. 75 (10). Washington, D.C.: United States Weather Bureau: 203–4. October 1947. Bibcode:1947MWRv...75..203.. doi:10.1175/1520-0493(1947)075<0203:SLSFO>2.0.CO;2. Archived from the original (PDF) on March 3, 2017 – via American Meteorological Society.
- Sumner, H. C. (December 1947). Culnan, Robert N. (ed.). "North Atlantic Hurricanes and Tropical Disturbances of 1947" (PDF). Monthly Weather Review. 75 (12). Washington, D.C.: United States Weather Bureau: 251–5. Bibcode:1947MWRv...75..251S. doi:10.1175/1520-0493(1947)075<0251:NAHATD>2.0.CO;2. Archived from the original (PDF) on April 29, 2017 – via American Meteorological Society.
- Tannehill, I. R. (1952) [1938]. Hurricanes: Their Nature and History (8th ed.). Princeton, New Jersey: Princeton University Press. OCLC 3024697 – via Internet Archive.
- United States Army Corps of Engineers (January 2, 1958) [1945]. Storm Rainfall in the United States: Depth-Area-Duration Data. War Department – via Internet Archive.
- Whipple, A. B. C. (1982). Storm. Time-Life Books. ISBN 0-8094-4312-0 – via Internet Archive.
- Willoughby, H. E.; Jorgensen, D. P.; Black, R. A.; Rosenthal, S. L. (May 1985). "Project STORMFURY: A Scientific Chronicle 1962-1983". Bulletin of the American Meteorological Society. 66 (5). American Meteorological Society: 505–14. Bibcode:1985BAMS...66..505W. doi:10.1175/1520-0477(1985)066<0505:PSASC>2.0.CO;2.
