= Man from Mundania =

1989 novel by Piers Anthony

- First edition
- Author: Piers Anthony
- Cover artist: Darrell K. Sweet
- Language: English
- Genre: Fantasy
- Publisher: Avon Books
- Publication date: October 1989
- Publication place: United States
- Media type: Print (Paperback)
- Pages: 329 (paperback 1st printing)
- ISBN: 0-380-75289-1
- OCLC: 20361013
- Preceded by: Heaven Cent
- Followed by: Isle of View

Man from Mundania is a fantasy novel by American writer Piers Anthony. The twelfth book of the Xanth series, it concludes the trilogy of Vale of the Vole and Heaven Cent.

== Plot introduction ==
The protagonist of Man from Mundania is seventeen-year-old Princess Ivy, daughter of King Dor and Queen Irene, older sister to Prince Dolph. Due to her ancestor Bink's deal in the second Xanth novel, The Source of Magic, Ivy has a magician-caliber magical talent of being able to selectively enhance the world around her to match her expectations. The story begins when Ivy decides to use the Heaven Cent, located by Dolph in the previous book Heaven Cent, to find the Good Magician Humfrey, who had been missing since Vale of the Vole.

== Plot summary ==
Princess Ivy sets off with her younger brother's co-fiancees Nada Naga and Electra to retrieve the magic mirror that had been stolen by the evil machine Com-Pewter, in preparation for her quest to find Good Magician Humfrey. After besting Com-Pewter in a battle of wits, Ivy uses the charged-up Heaven Cent to transport her to Humfrey's location.

Meanwhile, in Mundania, an average college boy named Grey Murphy runs a computer program that claims that it will help him meet women. Sure enough, after installing the "Worm" program, Grey meets a series of appropriately named girls who move into the neighboring apartment, starting with Agenda and moving on through Dyslexia and Euphoria. When Ivy arrives, disorientated to find herself in Mundania, Grey starts to fall for her despite her claims that she is a princess from a fantasy world called Xanth.

When Ivy wants to go home, Grey agrees to go with her, even though he doesn't believe that Xanth exists. Even when they've entered Xanth, Grey finds a scientific basis for the fantastical things he sees. His feelings for Ivy grow stronger, although Ivy knows that her regal parents won't allow her to marry a non-magician. The two of them take a trip through the Hypnogourd, where bad dreams are manufactured. After exiting the gourd, Grey, still skeptical of Xanth's magic, turns the Maenads' wine spring into water. Nada realizes his talent: magic nullification - which is a magician-caliber talent. It emerges that Grey is the son of Evil Magician Murphy and Vadne, both banished from Xanth in the book Castle Roogna, although they had never revealed their origins to him.
