= 1947 Atlantic hurricane season =

- Season summary map

Seasonal boundaries
- First system formed: June 13, 1947
- Last system dissipated: December 1, 1947

Strongest storm
- Name: "Fort Lauderdale" (George)
  - Maximum winds: 145 mph (230 km/h) (1-minute sustained)
  - Lowest pressure: 938 mbar (hPa; 27.7 inHg)

Seasonal statistics
- Total depressions: 15
- Total storms: 10
- Hurricanes: 5
- Major hurricanes (Cat. 3+): 2
- Total fatalities: 101
- Total damage: $184.2 million (1947 USD)

Related articles
- 1942–1948 Pacific hurricane seasons; 1947 Pacific typhoon season; 1940s North Indian Ocean cyclone seasons

The 1947 Atlantic hurricane season was the first Atlantic hurricane season to have tropical storms labeled by the United States Air Force. The season officially began on June 16, 1947, and ended on November 1, 1947. These dates conventionally delimit the period of each year when most tropical cyclones form in the Atlantic basin. However, the first tropical cyclone developed on June 13, while the final system was absorbed by a cold front on December 1. There were 10 tropical storms; 5 of them attained hurricane status, while two became major hurricanes, which are Category 3 or higher on the modern day Saffir–Simpson scale. Operationally, the third tropical storm was considered two separate tropical cyclones, resulting in the storm receiving two names. The eighth tropical storm went undetected and was not listed in HURDAT until 2014.

Nearly all tropical storms impacted land during the season, some of which caused many fatalities and left destruction. The second storm caused severe flooding and mudslides in Mexico, leaving at least 48 dead and 43 others missing. In September, the strongest and costliest hurricane of the season, the Fort Lauderdale hurricane, left severe damage in Florida, Louisiana, and Mississippi due to strong winds, heavy rainfall, and abnormally high tides. There were 51 fatalities and about $160.2 million (1947 USD) in damage. (Note: All damage figures are in 1947 US$, unless otherwise noted) The ninth storm, also known as the Cape Sable hurricane, caused additional flooding in South Florida and left wind damage in Georgia and South Carolina. The storm left about $20 million in damage. Overall, the systems of the season caused about $184.2 million in damage and at least 101 fatalities.

== Season summary ==
The Atlantic hurricane season officially began on June 16, 1947. However, tropical cyclogenesis began with the development of a tropical depression on June 13. There was a total of seven tropical storms, five of them strengthened into hurricanes, while two of those became major hurricanes – Category 3 or higher on the modern day Saffir–Simpson scale. The final system, a tropical depression, was absorbed by a cold front on December 1, one month after the official end of the season on November 1, 1947. Four hurricanes and four tropical storms made landfall during the season. Overall, the tropical cyclones of this season caused about $184.2 million in damage and at least 101 fatalities. The United States death toll of 53 was low compared to 20 years earlier in spite of the Fort Lauderdale (George) and Cape Sable (King) hurricanes crossing urban areas. The Weather Bureau attributed this to adequate warnings from the hurricane warning office and mass evacuations. A then-record total of 159 bulletins were issued from Weather Bureau offices.

The first tropical cyclone of the season, a tropical depression, existed from June 13 to June 14. However, activity went dormant for over a month and a half. On July 31, Baker developed in the Gulf of Mexico. In August, two tropical storms developed – Charlie and Dog–Easy. September featured five tropical cyclones, including Fox, George, and How, as well as two tropical depressions. George, more commonly known as the Fort Lauderdale hurricane, was the most intense tropical cyclone of the season, peaking as a Category 4 hurricane with maximum sustained winds of 145 mph (233 km/h) and a minimum barometric pressure of 938 mbar (27.7 inHg). October also had five tropical cyclone, including Item, King, Love, an unnamed storm, and a tropical depression. With four tropical storms, this was the most in the month of October since 1933. The season's final tropical cyclone, a depression, developed on November 28 and was absorbed by a cold front on December 1.

The season's activity was reflected with an accumulated cyclone energy (ACE) rating of 88. ACE is, broadly speaking, a measure of the power of the hurricane multiplied by the length of time it existed, so storms that last a long time, as well as particularly strong hurricanes, have high ACEs. It is only calculated for full advisories on tropical systems at or exceeding 39 mph (63 km/h), which is tropical storm strength.

== Systems ==
=== Tropical Storm One (Baker) ===
- Tropical storm (SSHWS)
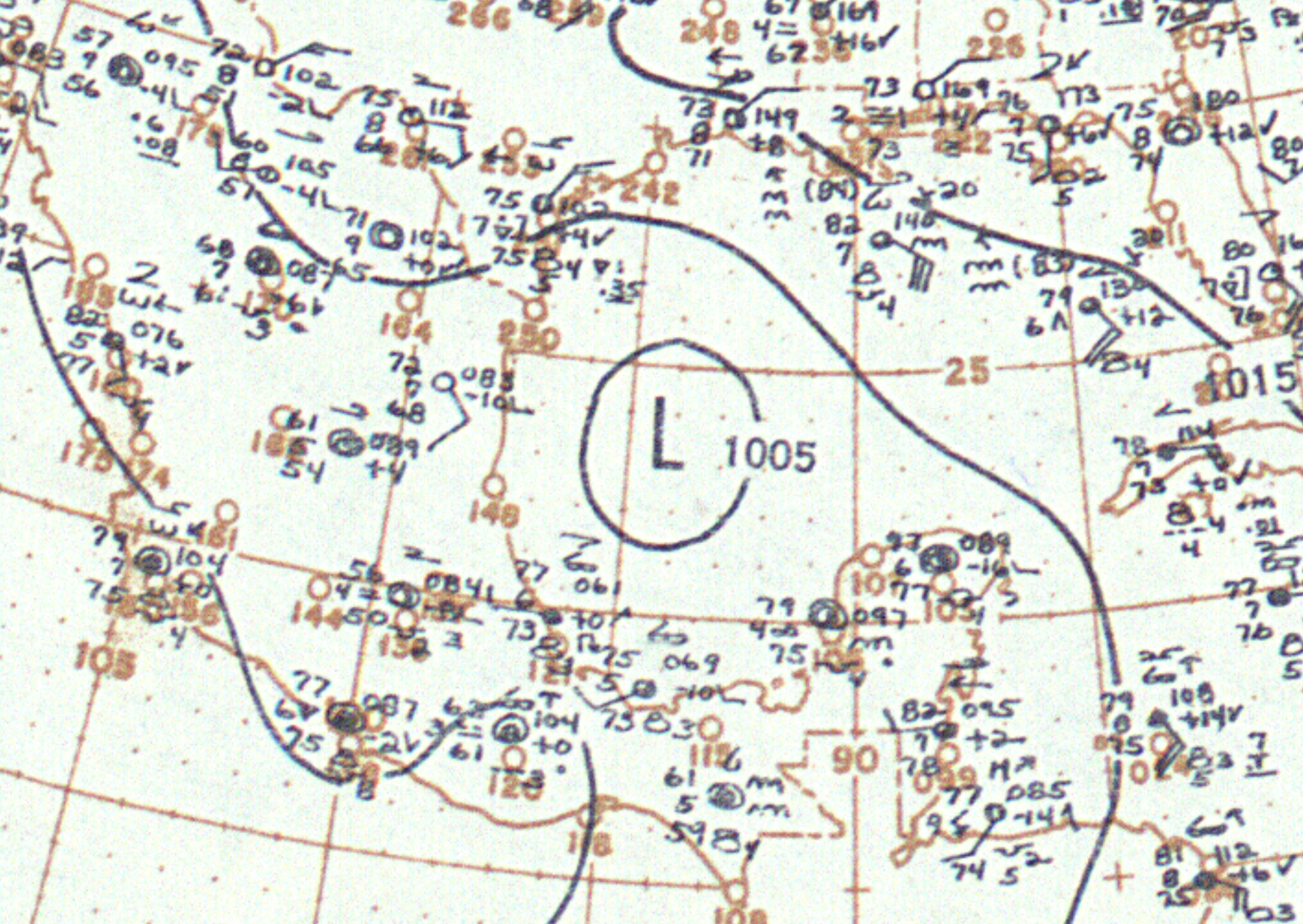
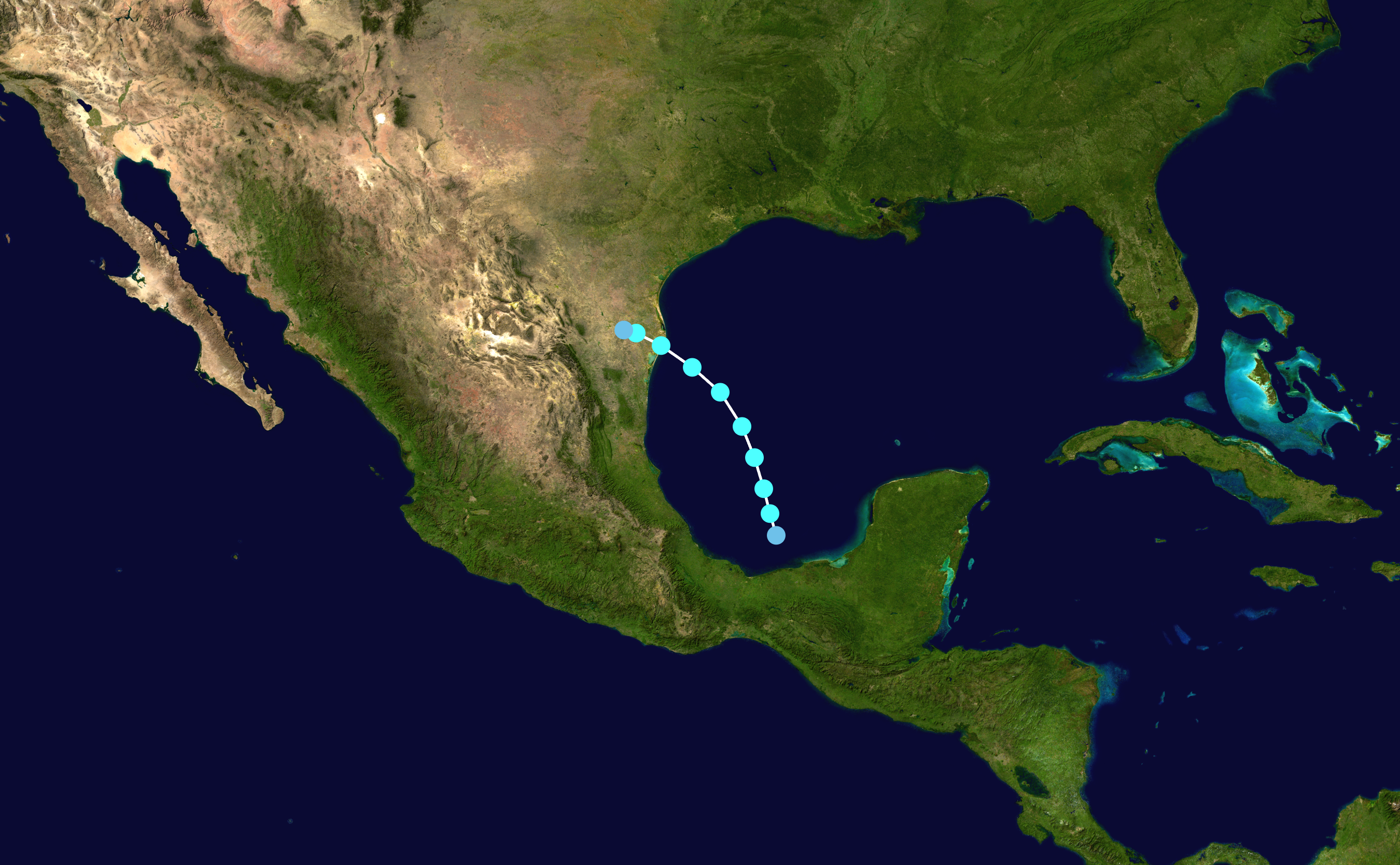
- Duration: July 31 – August 2
- Peak intensity: 50 mph (85 km/h) (1-min); ≤1001 mbar (hPa)

A low-pressure area in the Bay of Campeche developed into a tropical depression at 06:00 UTC on July 31. Moving north-northwestward, the depression deepened into a tropical storm six hours later. The storm, identified as "Baker" by the United States Air Force, then intensified slowly and gradually curved to the northwest. At 00:00 UTC on August 2, the storm attained its peak intensity with maximum sustained winds of 50 mph (80 km/h) and a minimum barometric pressure of 1001 mbar (29.6 inHg). The latter was observed at Port Isabel, Texas, while the former was estimated based on the pressure-wind relationship. Simultaneously, Baker made landfall in Tamaulipas about 25 mi (40 km) south of the Mexico–United States border. The system weakened to a tropical depression by 12:00 UTC on August 2 and dissipated near Reynosa shortly thereafter.

Small craft were advised between the lower and middle coast of Texas were advised to remain in port. The American Red Cross recommended that residents of Port Aransas evacuate as a precaution, but mainly only tourists in the area fled. Most of the damage was done to cotton crops, due to heavy rainfall, with up to 9.35 in (237 mm) observed at Raymondville. However, the precipitation was more beneficial than damaging. The storm caused just over $2 million in damage.

=== Hurricane Two (Charlie) ===
- Category 2 hurricane (SSHWS)
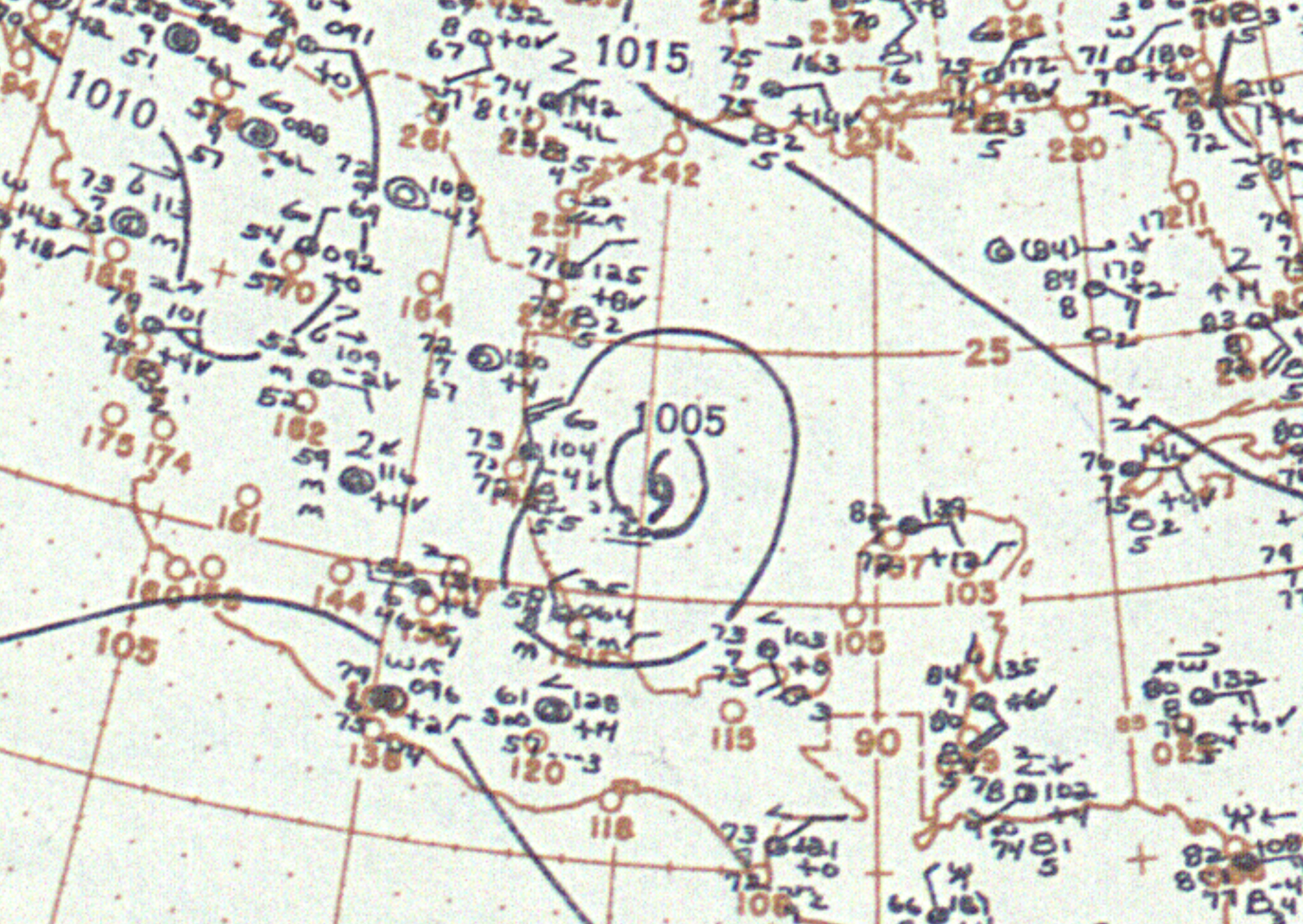
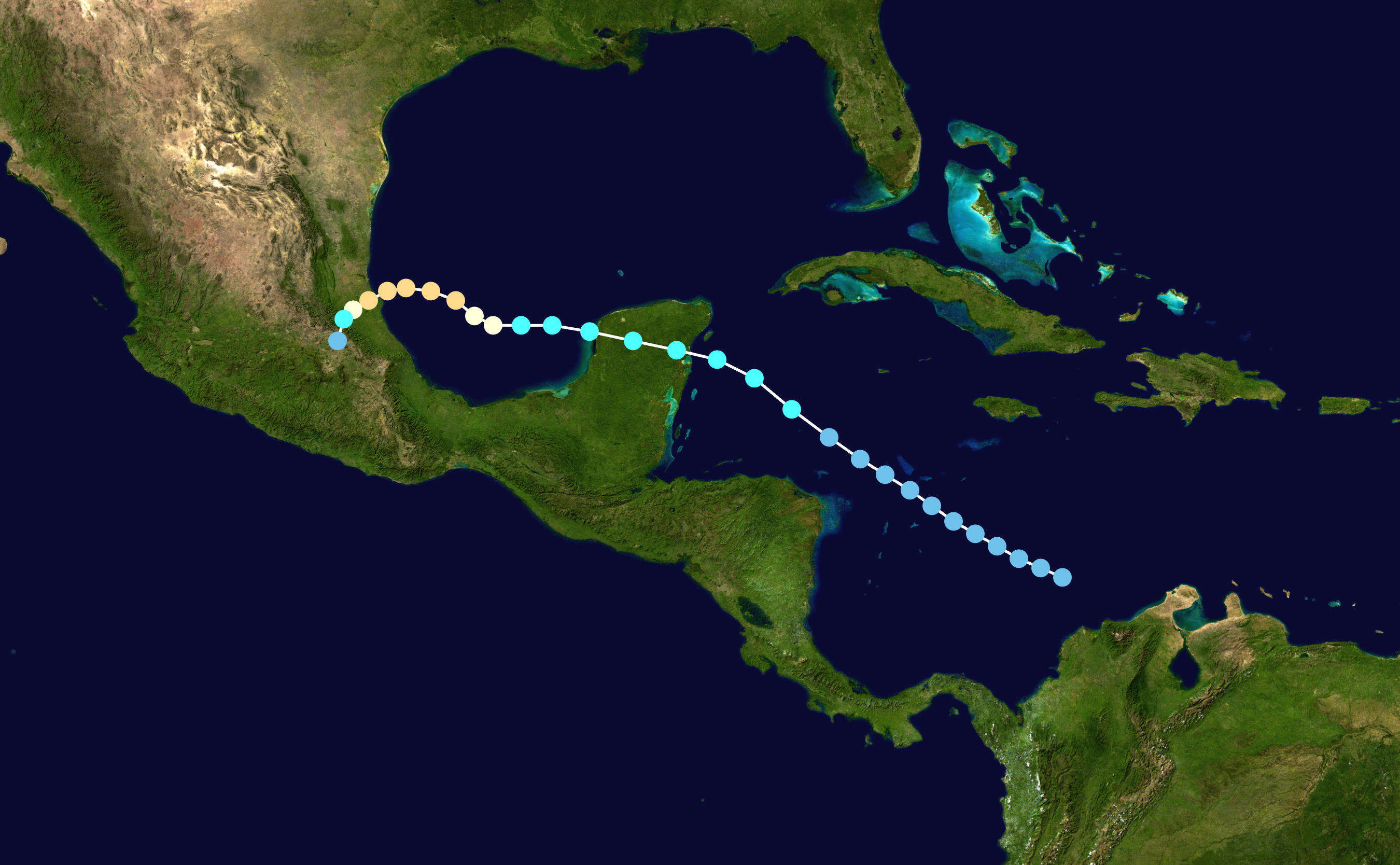
- Duration: August 9 – August 16
- Peak intensity: 110 mph (175 km/h) (1-min); ≤977 mbar (hPa)

A tropical depression developed about 125 mi (201 km) north-northwest of Colombia early on August 9. The depression moved northwestward across the Caribbean and remained weak for a few days, before reaching tropical storm status on 00:00 UTC on August 12. About 16 hours later, the cyclone – known to the United States Air Force as Tropical Storm Charlie – made landfall near Punta Allen, Quintana Roo, with winds of 50 mph (80 km/h). After entering the Bay of Campeche on August 13, the system resumed strengthening, becoming a hurricane early on August 14. Later that day, Charlie peaked as a Category 2 hurricane on the modern day Saffir–Simpson scale with maximum sustained winds of 110 mph (180 km/h) and a minimum barometric pressure of 977 mbar (28.9 inHg), both of which were observed during a reconnaissance aircraft flight. On August 15, the system curved southwestward and made landfall just south of Tampico, Tamaulipas, around 10:00 UTC, at the same intensity. The storm rapidly weakened after moving inland and dissipated by 06:00 UTC on August 16.

Heavy rainfall, strong winds, and storm surge walloped portions of Mexico, especially in Tampico and the state of Veracruz. In the former, storm surge forced the evacuation of residents near the coast. Winds unroofed several homes and resulted in the closure of many businesses. Signs atop buildings fell, while some equipment used by the Servicio Meteorológico Nacional was destroyed. Additionally, the city of Tampico was left without electricity for about five hours. Heavy rainfall caused small lakes and rivers to rise rapidly, flooding homes in the poorer sections and forcing a number of families to flee to higher ground. In El Higo, one of the worst impacted communities, the Pánuco River exceeded its bank, inundating the village with over 8 ft (2.4 m) of water. Most of the one story buildings were submerged, while water approached the second story of taller buildings. Thirty-six deaths occurred in the city. In Chontla, 24 homes were destroyed. Flooding and mudslides in San Luis Potosí resulted in another 12 deaths. Overall, the hurricane caused at least 48 fatalities and left 43 other people missing.

=== Hurricane Three (Dog–Easy) ===
- Category 1 hurricane (SSHWS)
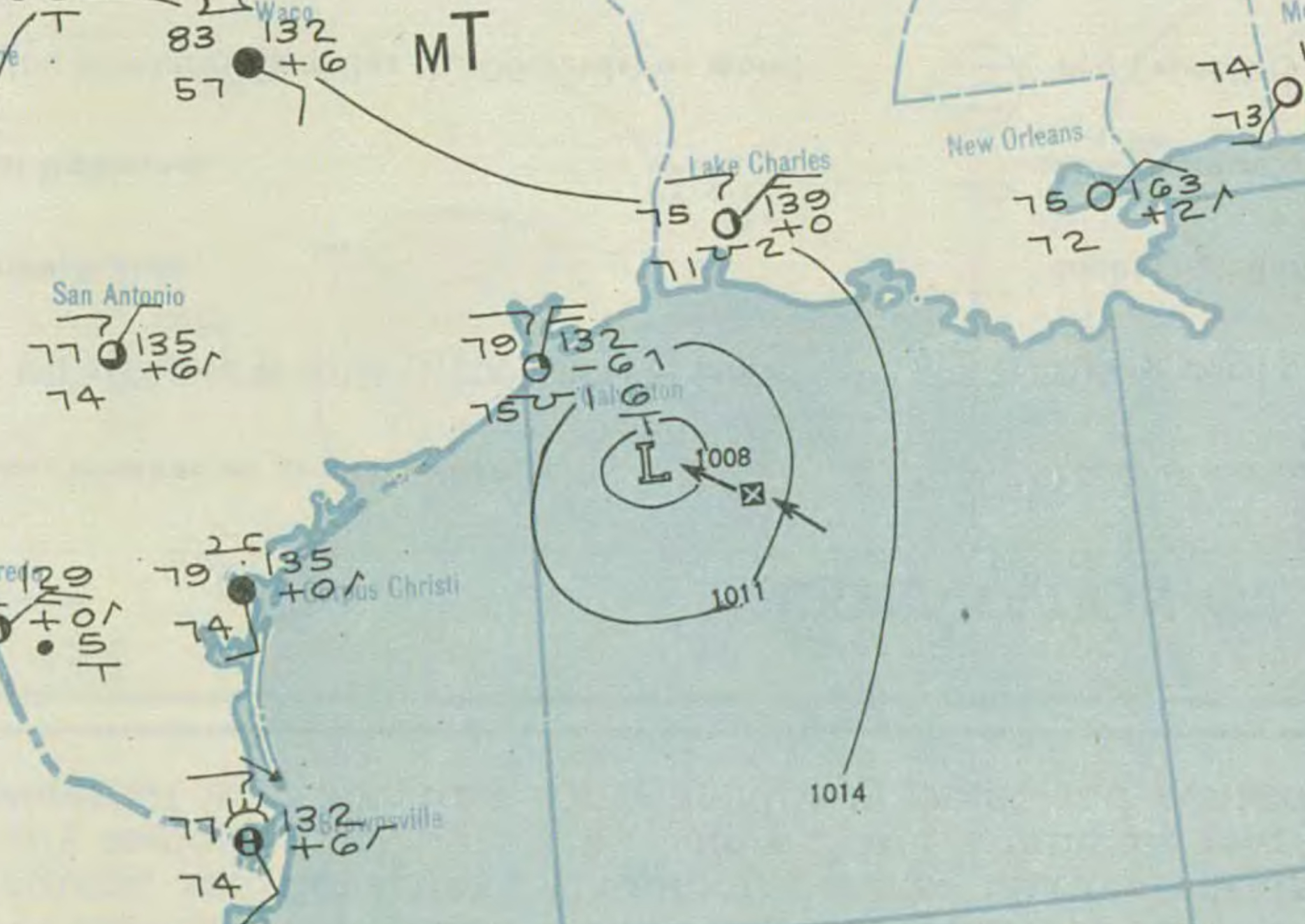
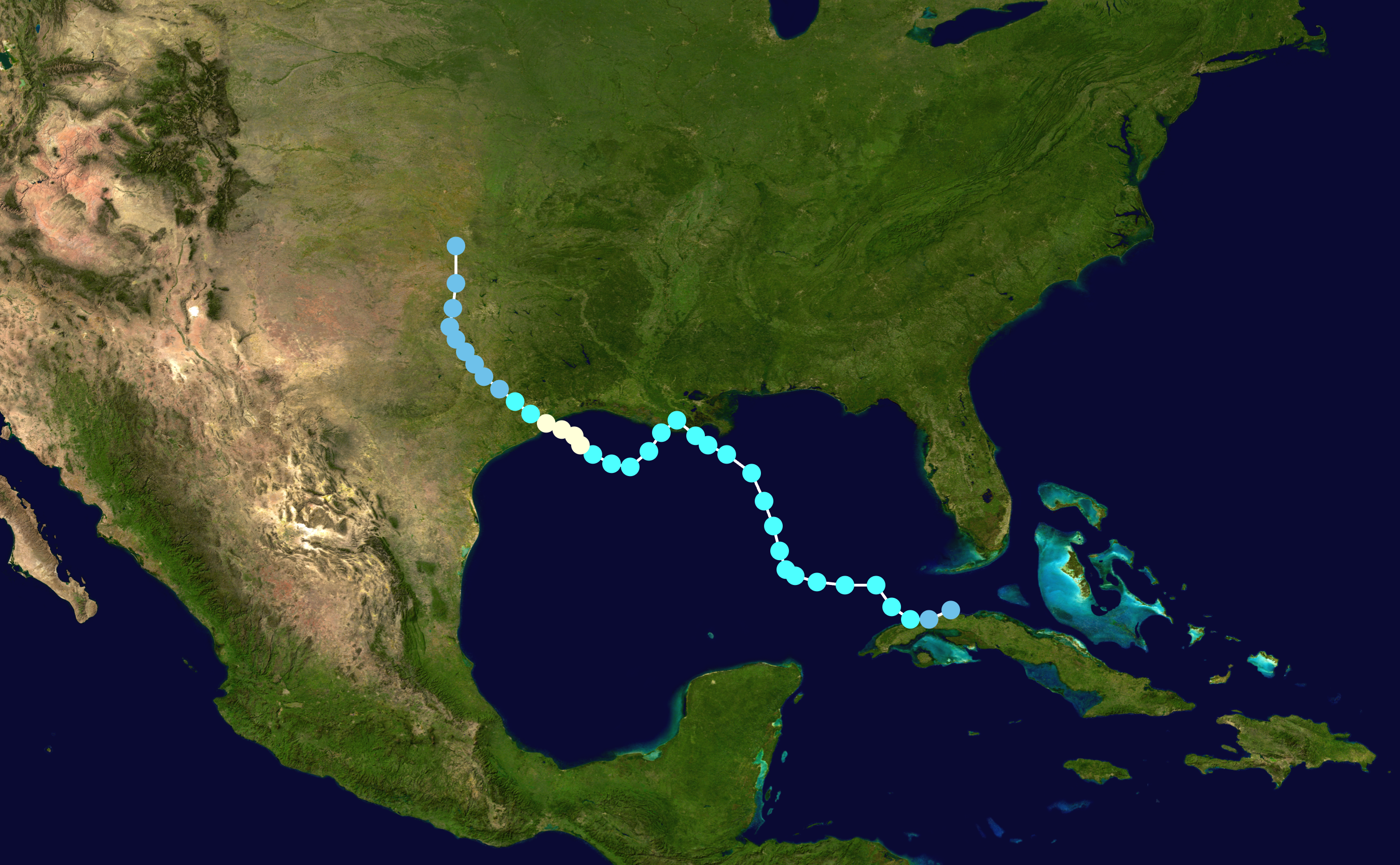
- Duration: August 18 – August 27
- Peak intensity: 80 mph (130 km/h) (1-min); 984 mbar (hPa)

A tropical wave developed into a tropical depression just northeast of Havana, Cuba, late on August 18. The depression briefly moved inland along the north coast of Cuba, before emerging into the Gulf of Mexico early on August 19. At 06:00 UTC, the system intensified into a tropical storm. Shortly thereafter, the cyclone curved northwestward, before turning westward late on August 19. About 24 hours later, the storm curved north-northwestward. At 14:00 UTC on August 22, the system made landfall near Golden Meadow, Louisiana, with winds of 45 mph (72 km/h). However, the cyclone turned southwestward and soon reemerged into the Gulf of Mexico. The storm then curved northwestward on August 23 and finally began to strengthen significantly. At 06:00 UTC on August 24, it intensified into a hurricane. About 12 hours later, the hurricane peaked with maximum sustained winds of 80 mph (130 km/h) and a minimum barometric pressure of 984 mbar (29.1 inHg); the latter was observed on land and was used to estimate the former. The cyclone made landfall in Galveston, Texas, at 22:00 UTC. Moving inland, the system weakened to a tropical storm early on August 25 and to a tropical depression later that day. Thereafter, the depression slowly weakened, until dissipating over Oklahoma on August 27. Operationally, this cyclone was believed to have been two systems, causing the United States Air Force to inadvertently assign it two names – Dog and Easy.

The storm left little impact in Louisiana, with mainly squalls reported and winds up to 43 mph (69 km/h) observed at Grand Isle. In Texas, tides reached 4 ft (1.2 m) above normal in Galveston. A sustained wind speed exceeding 72 mph (116 km/h) was observed in the city, damaging roofs, signs, and the interior of dwellings. Numerous power wires were downed, causing the electricity to be shut down to avoid residents coming into contact with a live wire, but not before a man touched a downed power line and died. In Galveston County, but outside the city, crop damage reached about $32,500, while property damage totaled about $150,000. At Texas City, communication lines were downed, signs were toppled, homes were deroofed, and boats were washed ashore or set adrift. In Dickinson, several dwellings were destroyed. Farther north, 35 to 40 people at a prison near Houston escaped in the midst of the storm, though 10 of them were recaptured by the following day. Overall, the total damage was estimated at $757,000, with $500,000 of that amount incurred to buildings and improvements, while the remainder was to crops.

=== Hurricane Four (George) ===
- Category 4 hurricane (SSHWS)
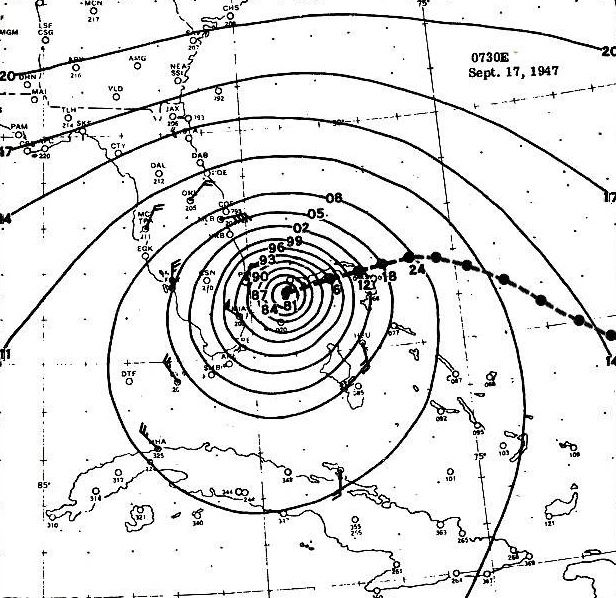
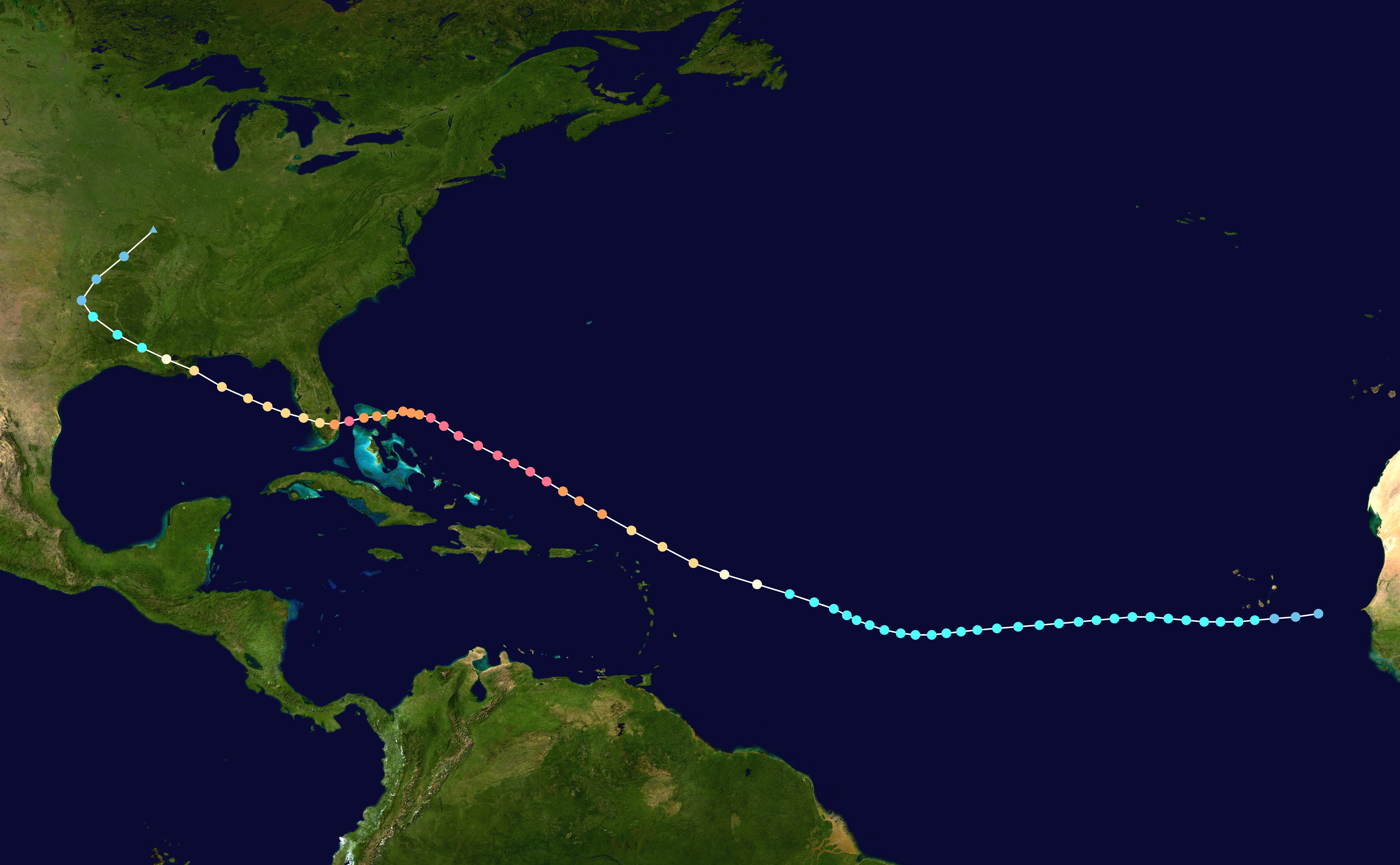
- Duration: September 4 – September 21 (Extratropical on September 21)
- Peak intensity: 145 mph (230 km/h) (1-min); 938 mbar (hPa)

A tropical wave developed into a tropical depression about 175 mi (282 km) west-southwest of Senegal early on September 4. Several hours later, the depression strengthened into a tropical storm, which was named George by the United States Air Force in real time. After moving generally westward for several days, the storm failed to intensify significantly and turned northwestward on September 10. By the following day, George finally became a Category 1 hurricane. The storm intensified further over the next few days and later peaked as a Category 4 hurricane with maximum sustained winds of 145 mph (233 km/h) and a minimum barometric pressure of 938 mbar (27.7 inHg). Early on September 16, George weakened to a Category 3 and curved westward while approaching the northern Bahamas. At 19:00 UTC, the hurricane struck the Abaco Islands with winds of 120 mph (190 km/h). In the Bahamas, the storm produced a large storm surge and strong winds, damaging or destroying many homes and docks on the western end of Grand Bahama.

Thereafter, George continued westward and re-intensified into a Category 4 at 12:00 UTC on September 17, just three and a half hours before the storm made landfall near Fort Lauderdale, Florida, with winds of 130 mph (210 km/h). In Florida, advance warnings and stringent building codes were credited with minimizing structural damage and reducing loss of life to 17 people, but nevertheless widespread flooding and coastal damage resulted from heavy rainfall and high tides. Many vegetable plantings, citrus groves, and cattle were submerged or drowned as the storm exacerbated already high water levels and briefly threatened to breach the dikes surrounding Lake Okeechobee. However, the dikes held firm, and evacuations were otherwise credited with minimizing the potential death toll. On the west coast of the state, the storm caused further flooding, extensive damage south of the Tampa Bay area, and the loss of the Cuban fishing vessel Antonio Cerdado offshore Fort Myers, resulting in seven deaths. Damage in Florida reached $31.8 million.

On September 18, the hurricane entered the Gulf of Mexico and threatened the Florida panhandle. Later, George made landfall southeast of New Orleans, on September 19 as a strong Category 2 with winds of 110 mph (180 km/h). George weakened to a tropical storm later that day, and then to a tropical depression on September 20. The cyclone was absorbed by a cold front over Missouri on the following day. Strong winds in the vicinity of Lake Pontchartrain caused water to over-top the levees, leaving some lakefront streets inundated "waist-deep" and many areas of the city under about 2 ft (0.61 m) of water. New Orleans alone suffered about $100 million in damage. The widespread flooding spurred flood-protection legislation and the creation of an enlarged levee system to safeguard the flood-prone area. Some coastal flooding also occurred in Mississippi. The state suffered slightly more than $28.4 million in damage. The storm destroyed 1,647 homes and structurally impacted 25,000 others in both Louisiana and Mississippi. Throughout its path, the hurricane caused $160.2 million in damage and 51 casualties.

=== Tropical Storm Five (Fox) ===
- Tropical storm (SSHWS)
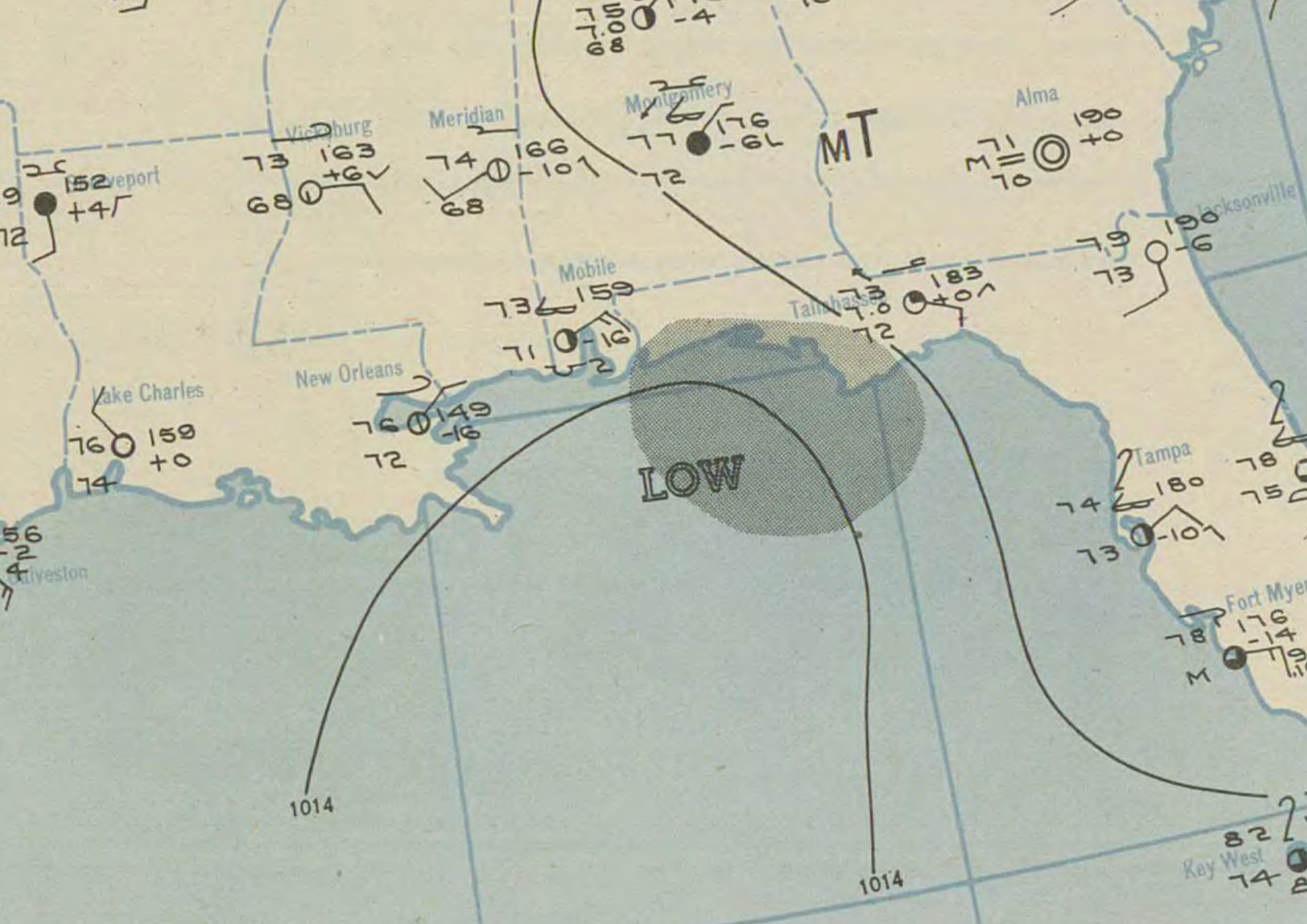
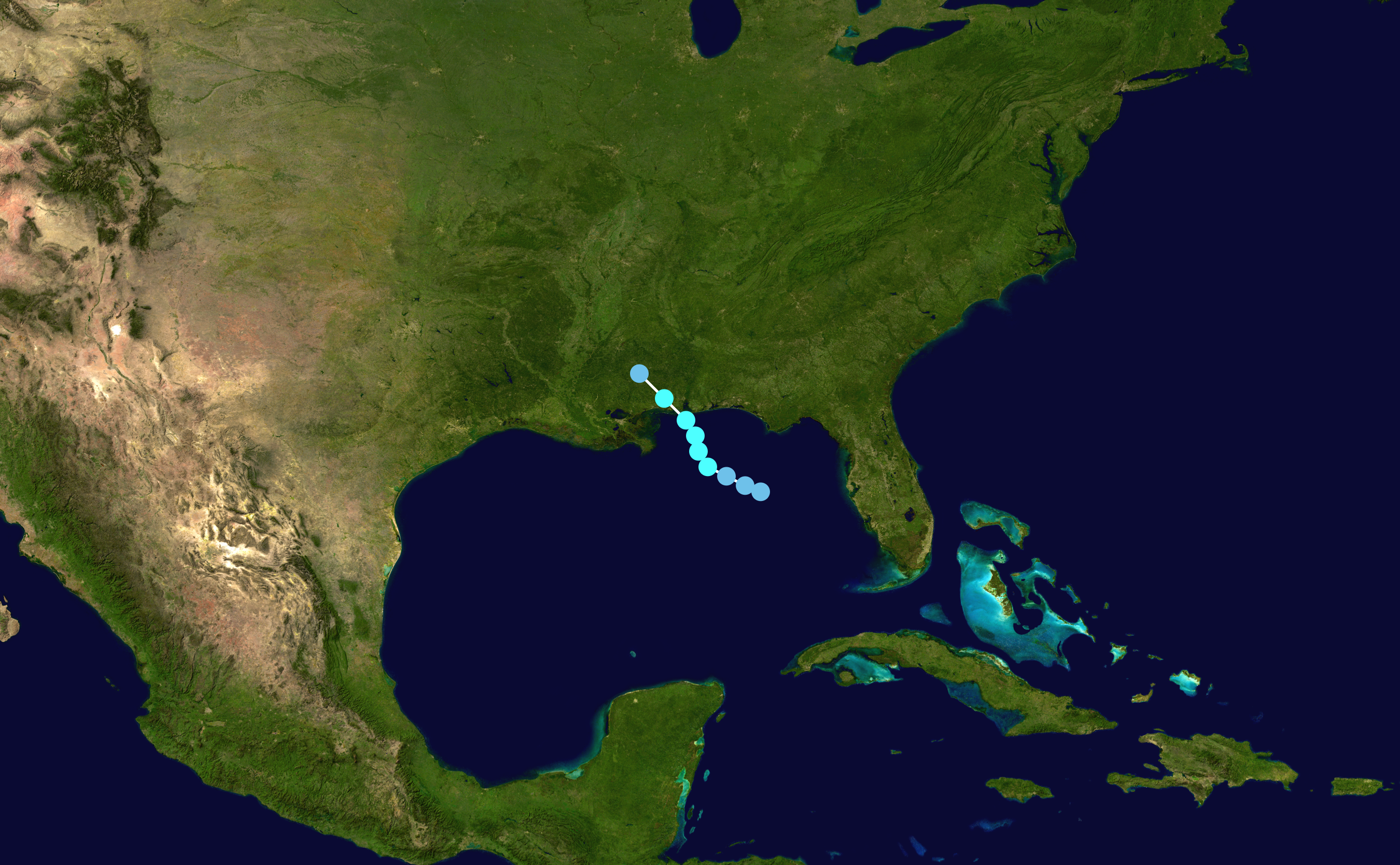
- Duration: September 7 – September 9
- Peak intensity: 60 mph (95 km/h) (1-min); ≤1006 mbar (hPa)

At 00:00 UTC on September 7, a low pressure area developed into a tropical depression about 135 mi (217 km) south-southwest of Cape St. George Island, Florida. The depression moved northward and intensified, reaching tropical storm status about 18 hours later, and being assigned the name "Fox" by the United States Air Force. Around that time, the cyclone curved north-northwestward. Early on September 8, Fox peaked with maximum sustained winds of 60 mph (97 km/h), which was observed by a ship. Between 07:00 and 10:00 UTC, an observation station in Mobile, Alabama, recorded a barometric pressure of 1006 mbar (29.7 inHg), the lowest known in association with the cyclone. At 14:00 UTC on September 8, the storm made landfall on Dauphin Island, Alabama, and later near Bayou La Batre. By early the next day, the system weakened to a tropical depression and dissipated over southern Mississippi shortly thereafter.

Some coastal areas reported strong wind gusts, including 45 mph (72 km/h) in Mobile, Alabama, and 51 mph (82 km/h) in Pensacola, Florida. At Mobile Bay, two ships were beached, but were re-floated later that day. Overall, damage from the storm was minimal.

=== Tropical Storm Six (How) ===
- Tropical storm (SSHWS)
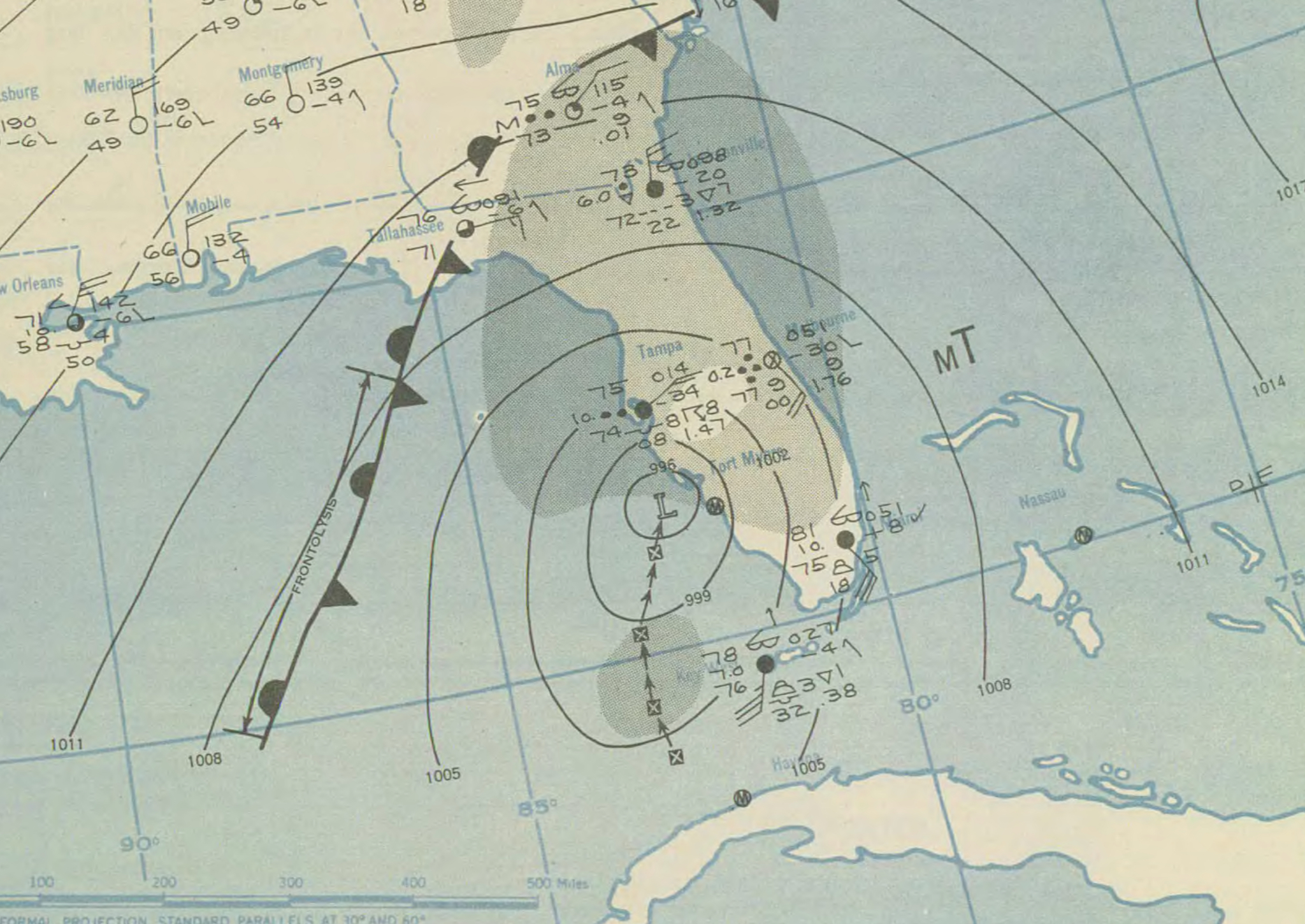
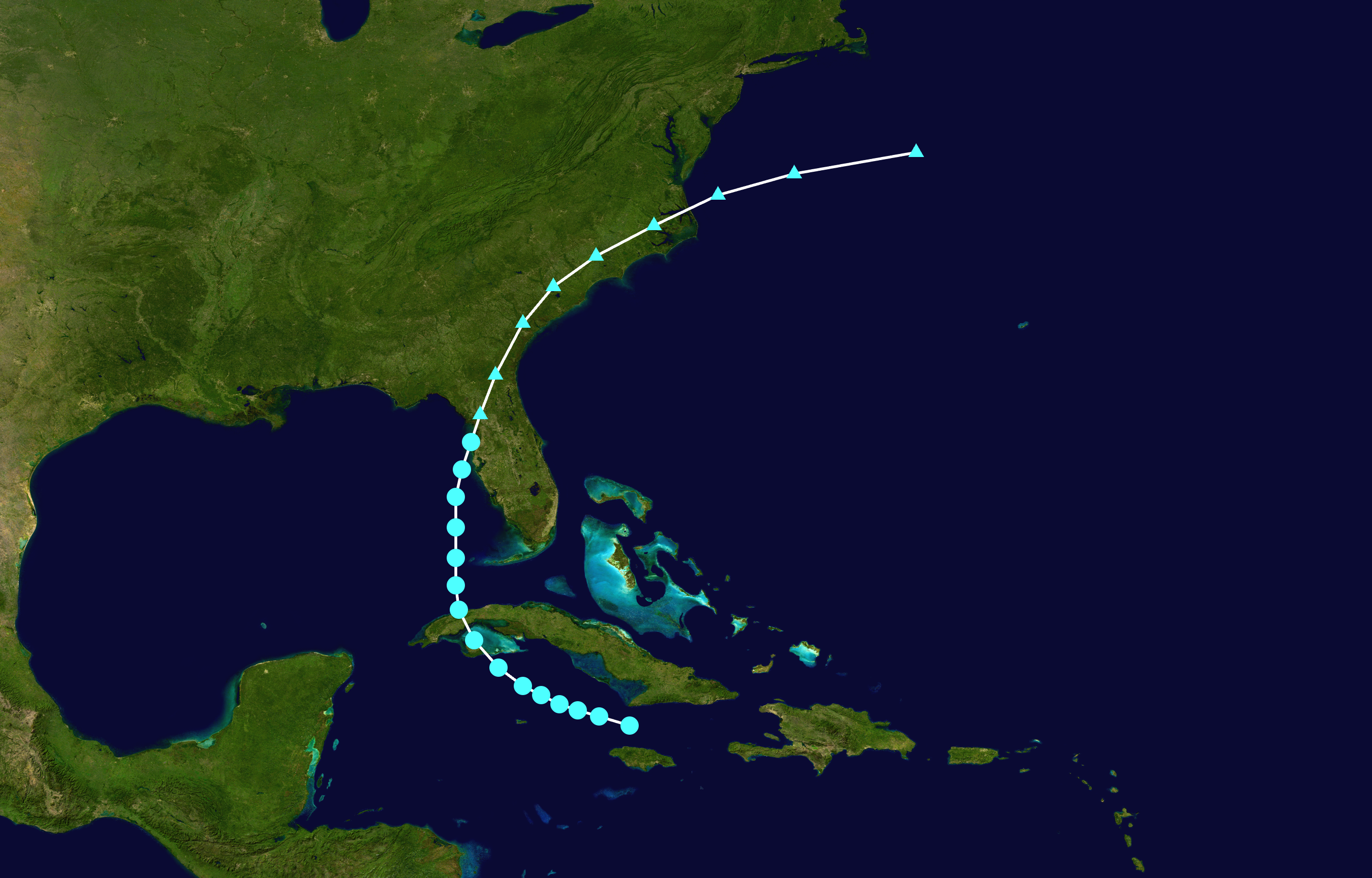
- Duration: September 20 – September 26 (Extratropical on September 24)
- Peak intensity: 65 mph (100 km/h) (1-min); 990 mbar (hPa)

A tropical wave developed into a tropical storm just north Jamaica on September 20. The storm, assigned the name "How" by the United States Air Force – moved west-northwestward to northwestward and slowly intensified as it passed near Cayman Brac, Cayman Islands. At 22:00 UTC on September 21, the cyclone struck Cuba's Isla de la Juventud with winds of 50 mph (80 km/h), about five hours before making landfall near the modern day border of Artemisa and Pinar del Río provinces. Thereafter, the storm moved northward to north-northeastward. How made landfall near Crystal River, Florida, with winds of 65 mph (105 km/h) around 22:00 UTC on September 23. The wind speed, the highest associated with the storm, was estimated based on an observation of a barometric pressure of 990 mbar (29 inHg) at St. Leo. The storm was already losing tropical characteristics prior to landfall, and transitioned into an extratropical cyclone by 00:00 UTC on September 24, just two hours after moving inland. The remnants moved northeastward over Georgia and the Carolinas, before emerging into the Atlantic from North Carolina on September 25. By early the following day, the remnants of the cyclone dissipated.

Throughout Florida, wind speeds of 40 to 60 mph (64 to 97 km/h) were observed, with winds of 60 mph (97 km/h) common between Sarasota and Cedar Key. A series of tornadoes left damage across Central and North Florida. A tornado in Seffner destroyed three homes and damaged several trees. In Ocala, a tornado downed trees and power lines and deroofed two homes. Two twisters in Jacksonville damaged roofs, trees, and electrical and power lines, while another tornado in Arlington (which was later annexed by Jacksonville) moved a home off its foundation, damaged roofs, and downed trees. Heavy rainfall in some areas worsened the flooding situation that began with the Fort Lauderdale hurricane. Above normal tides caused some erosion between Bradenton and Tarpon Springs. The storm left about $100,000 in damage in Florida. The storm and its remnants brought heavy rainfall to Georgia, including 7.5 in (190 mm) of precipitation at Brunswick in 24 hours. Street flooding was reported there, with water nearly entering businesses. In Savannah, streets were inundated with several feet of water, resulting in the rescue of several families.

=== Tropical Storm Seven (Item) ===
- Tropical storm (SSHWS)
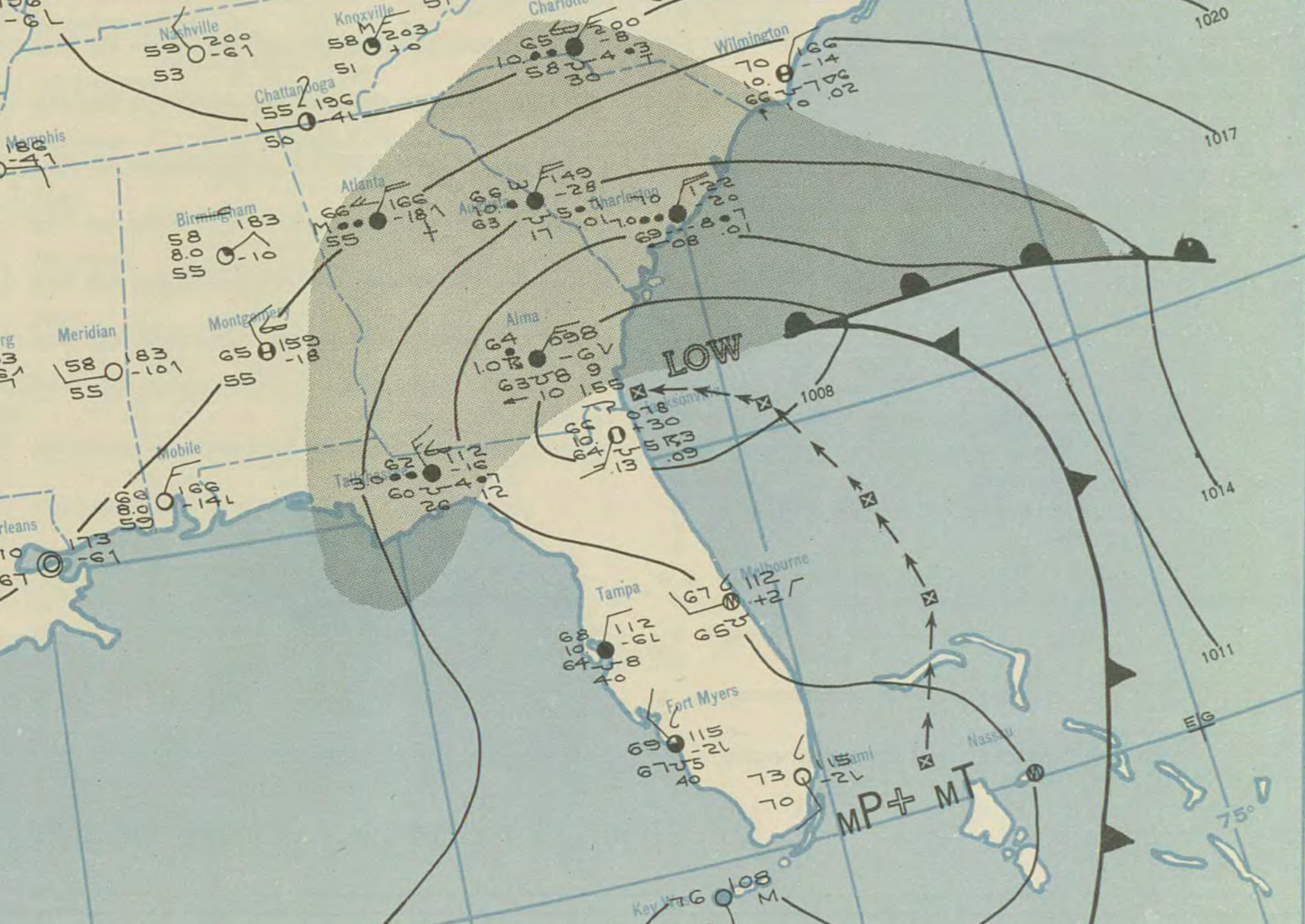
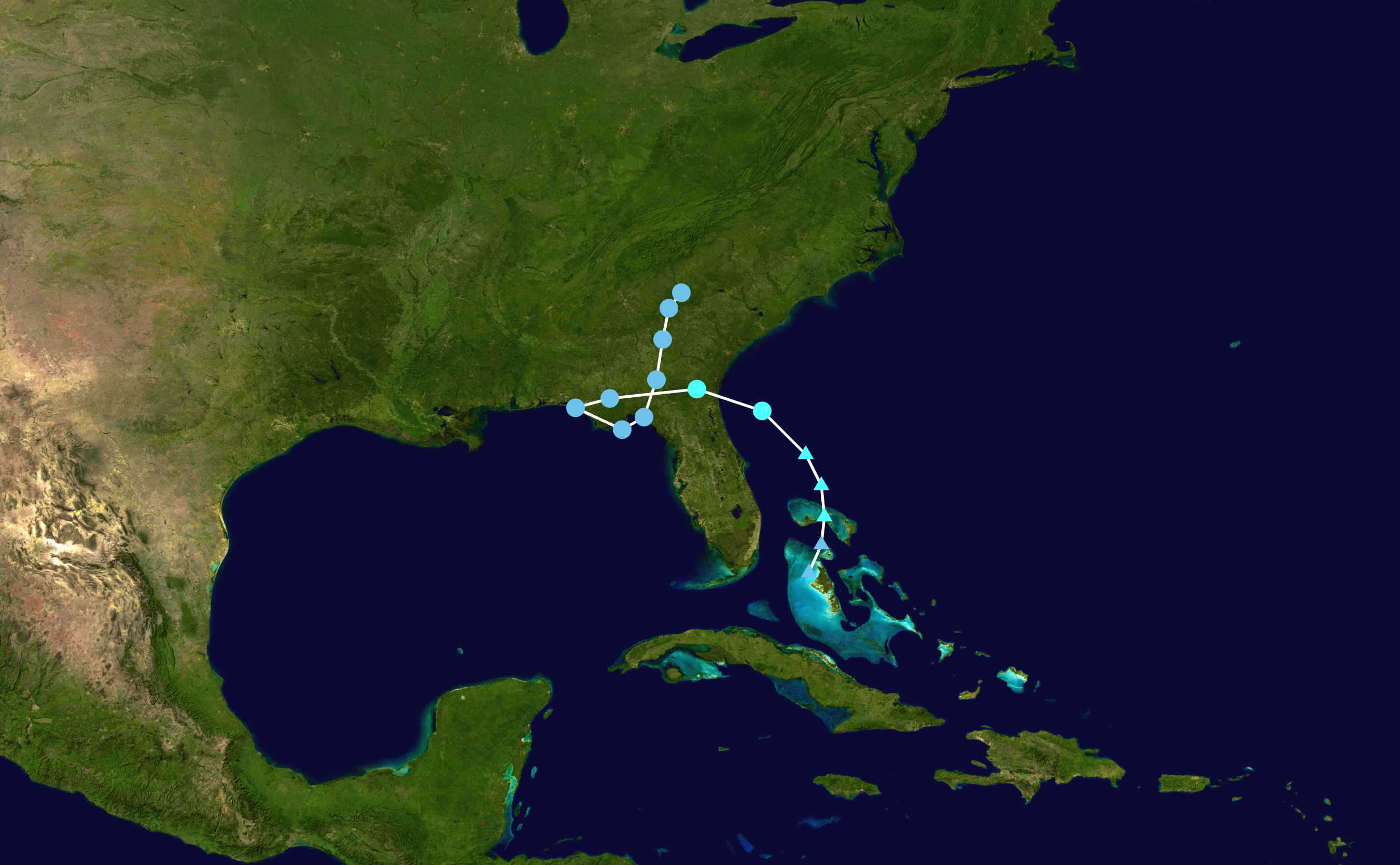
- Duration: October 7 – October 9
- Peak intensity: 60 mph (95 km/h) (1-min); 1000 mbar (hPa)

An extratropical low pressure area transitioned into a tropical storm offshore North Florida on October 7, after acquiring a more symmetrical structure and the strongest winds moving closer to the center. However, the system had characteristics of a subtropical cyclone, including a moderate temperature gradient still existing at the center and an upper-level trough remaining associated with the storm. The United States Air Force referred to this system as "Item". At 00:30 UTC on October 7, a ship observed winds of 52 mph (84 km/h) and a barometric pressure of 1000 mbar (30 inHg). The former was used to estimate the storm's maximum sustained wind speed of 60 mph (97 km/h), while the latter was the lowest barometric pressure in association with the cyclone. Item made landfall near Kings Bay, Georgia, at peak intensity around 04:00 UTC on October 7. The storm weakened to a tropical depression about eight hours later. It executed a cyclonic loop, briefly emerging into the Gulf of Mexico near Apalachicola, Florida, before moving inland again over rural Taylor County. Thereafter, Item moved north-northeastward and continued weakening, before dissipating over northern Georgia on October 9.

In North Florida, the coast was hit by abnormally high tides, after previously experiencing above normal tides for more than a week. The storm spawned a tornado in Jacksonville that was on the ground for about 0.75 mi (1.21 km). The twister crossed a wartime housing project, a trailer park, and a business section of town. Twenty-eight trailers were flipped over or smashed against each other, while the dwellings in the housing project were deroofed. The walls and interiors of some stores in a four block area were damaged. Trees and automobiles also suffered damage. Overall, the tornado left $100,000 in damage, 40 people homeless, and at least 13 injured persons.

=== Tropical Storm Eight ===
- Tropical storm (SSHWS)
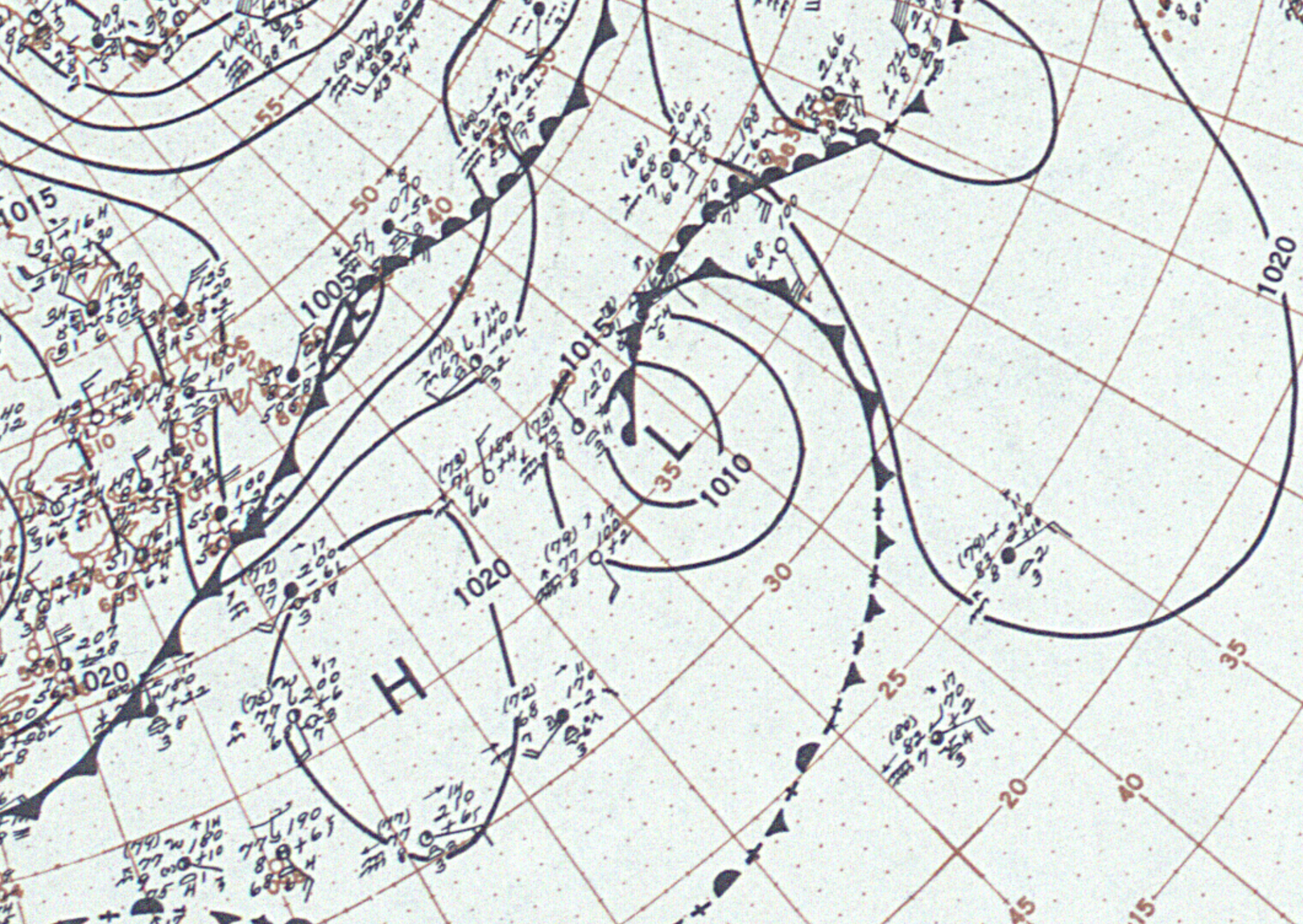
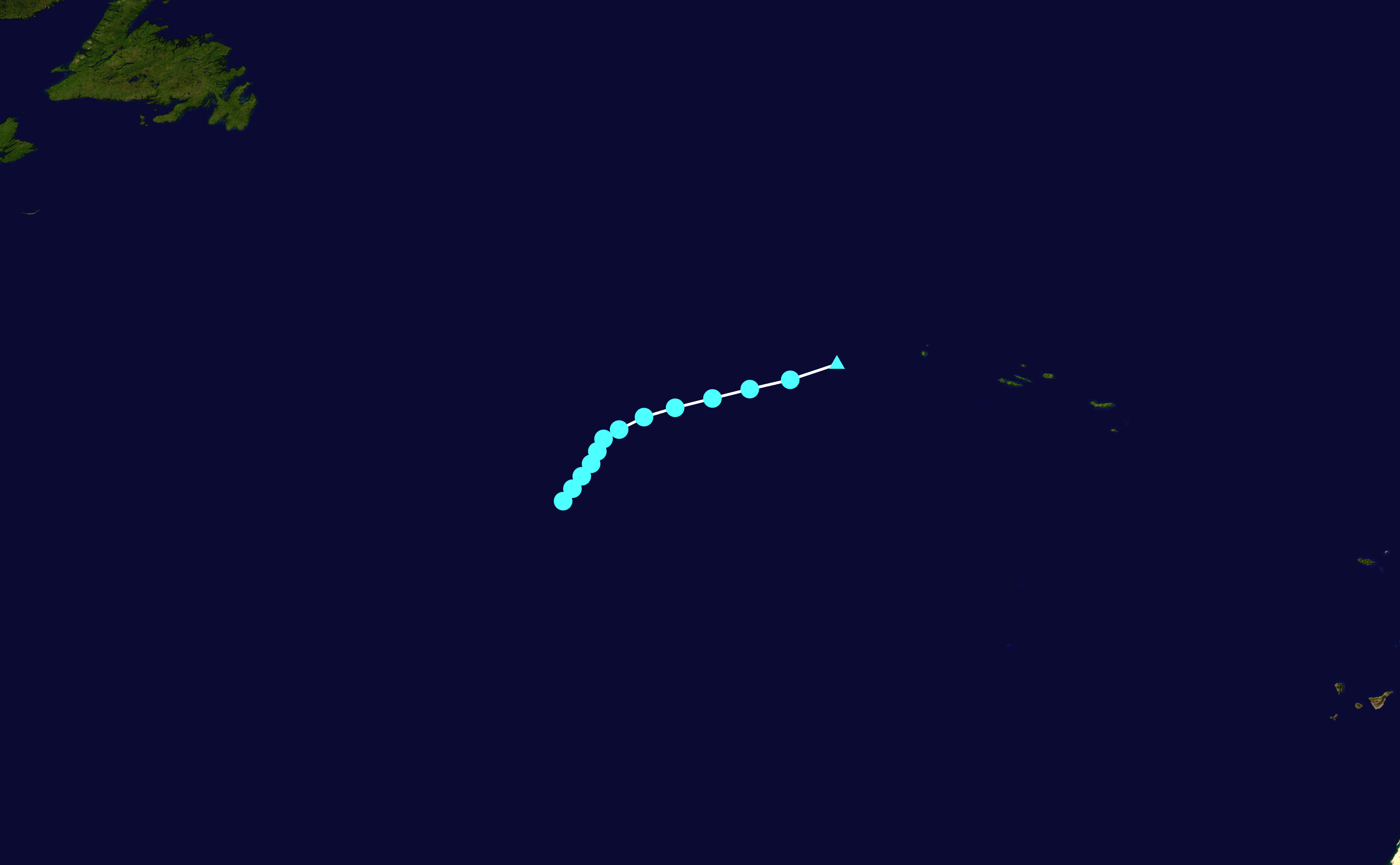
- Duration: October 8 – October 11
- Peak intensity: 60 mph (95 km/h) (1-min); ≤1001 mbar (hPa)

A low pressure area detached from a cold front and developed into a tropical depression on October 8, about 710 mi (1,140 km) southwest of Flores Island in the Azores. Moving slowly northeastward, the cyclone strengthened, despite relatively cool air and sea surface temperatures, with sustained winds reaching 60 mph (97 km/h) later that day. Early on October 9, the system curved east-northeastward. The following day, a ship observed a barometric pressure of 1001 mbar (29.6 inHg), the lowest pressure associated with the storm. By early on October 11, the system was absorbed by an extratropical cyclone about 150 mi (240 km) west-southwest of Flores Island.

=== Hurricane Nine (King) ===
- Category 2 hurricane (SSHWS)
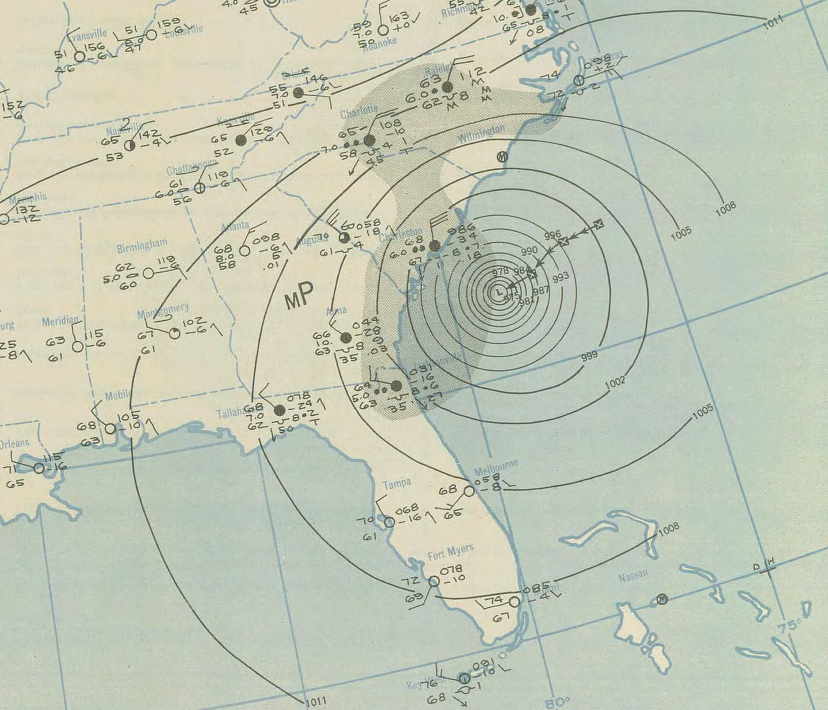
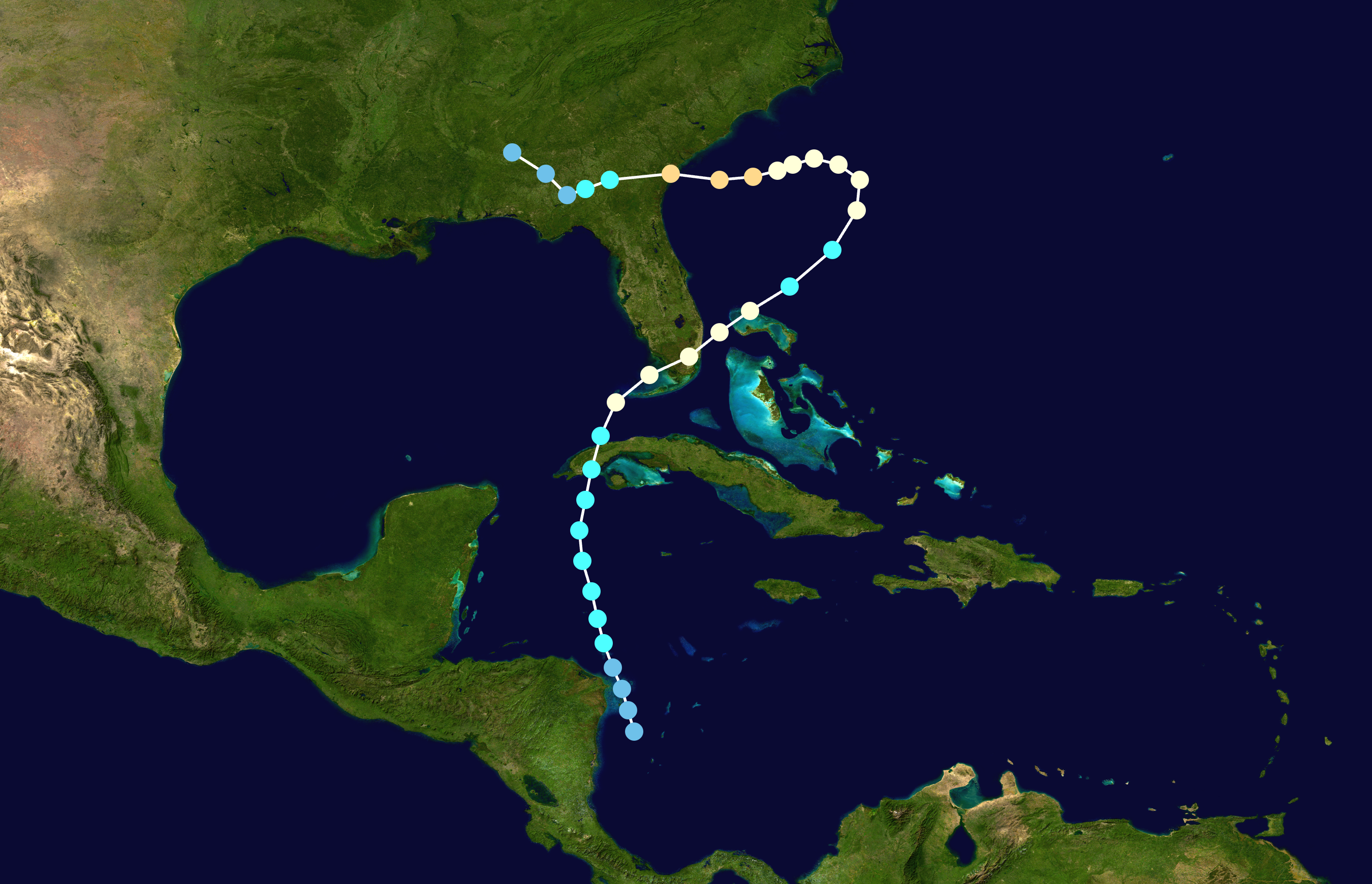
- Duration: October 8 – October 16
- Peak intensity: 105 mph (165 km/h) (1-min); 965 mbar (hPa)

A tropical depression was detected off the coast of Nicaragua on October 8. The depression drifted northward, becoming Tropical Storm King the next day. The tropical storm then passed over the western tip of Cuba, producing a peak wind gust of 57 mph (92 km/h). King strengthened over the southeastern Gulf of Mexico to attain hurricane status on October 11. After brushing the Florida Keys, the hurricane made landfall near Cape Sable, Florida on October 12 with winds of 90 mph (140 km/h) and a central pressure of about 975 mbar (28.79 inHg). The hurricane moved offshore near Pompano Beach and later turned back to the west, toward the Southeastern United States. The storm strengthened as it turned to the west, and on October 15, King made its final landfall near the Georgia–South Carolina state line as a Category 2 hurricane. After moving inland, King quickly weakened to a tropical storm and then a tropical depression early on October 16, before dissipating over Alabama later that day. The hurricane was noted for the first time hurricane seeding was conducted in the Atlantic basin by the United States Weather Bureau through an operation called Project Cirrus. A Boeing B-17 Flying Fortress dropped 80 lb (36 kg) of dry ice onto the storm from 500 ft (150 m) above its cloudtop after it had moved 350 mi (560 km) off Jacksonville, Florida. Shortly afterward, the storm reversed course and headed for Savannah. The scientists conducting the experiment believed they had caused this change, but a 1906 hurricane followed a similar path.

An airport in south Florida recorded peak winds of 80 mph (130 km/h). The hurricane dropped 5–13 in (130–330 mm) of rain across central and southern part of the state, including in Hialeah where the storm produced 3.6 in (91 mm) in a one-hour period and over 6 in (150 mm) in a 75-minute period. The flooding rains left many neighborhoods in up to six feet of water due to a previously wet summer, and left over 2,000 Miami-Dade County residents homeless. The flooding also closed Route 1 from Miami to Fort Lauderdale, as well as a highway to Everglades City. The hurricane spawned a tornado in both Coral Gables and Miami, one of which destroyed three warehouses. Following the passage of the hurricane, Hialeah mayor Henry Milander declared a state of emergency and restricted access to the city. In Miami, many residents had to use boats and rafts to survey the damage and look for survivors, due to the flooding. Winds in Georgia peaked at 85 mph (137 km/h) in Savannah. Elsewhere in the state, the storm caused $500,000 in damage, mainly due to a tornado that touched down near Hinesville. Tides 12 ft (3.7 m) above normal were reported from Georgia to South Carolina. The high tides in Charleston, South Carolina, caused minor beach erosion and isolated street flooding, and one person was killed there by a falling tree. In North Carolina, the high tides caused minor flooding. Overall, the hurricane caused about $20 million in damage.

=== Hurricane Ten (Love) ===
- Category 3 hurricane (SSHWS)
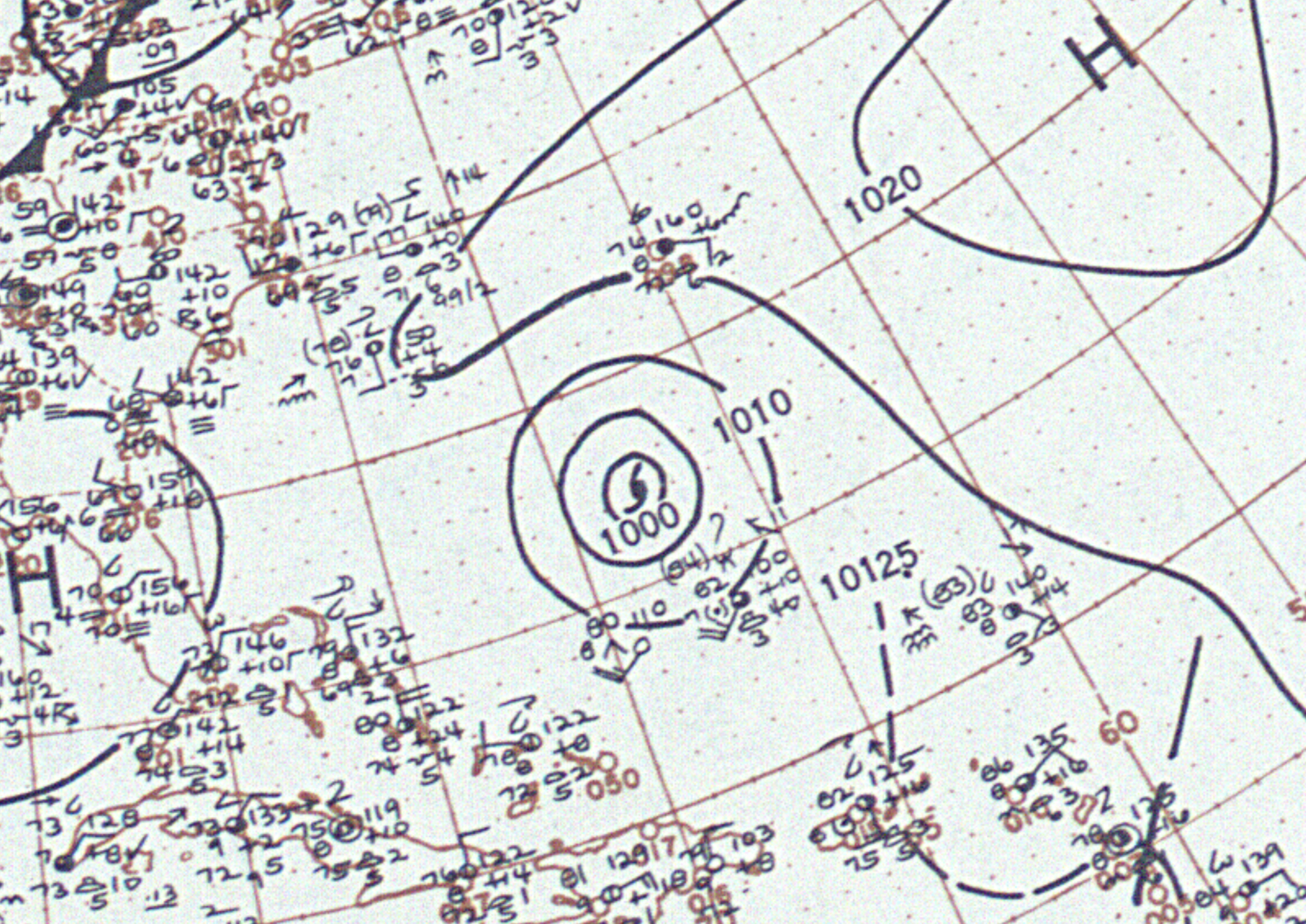
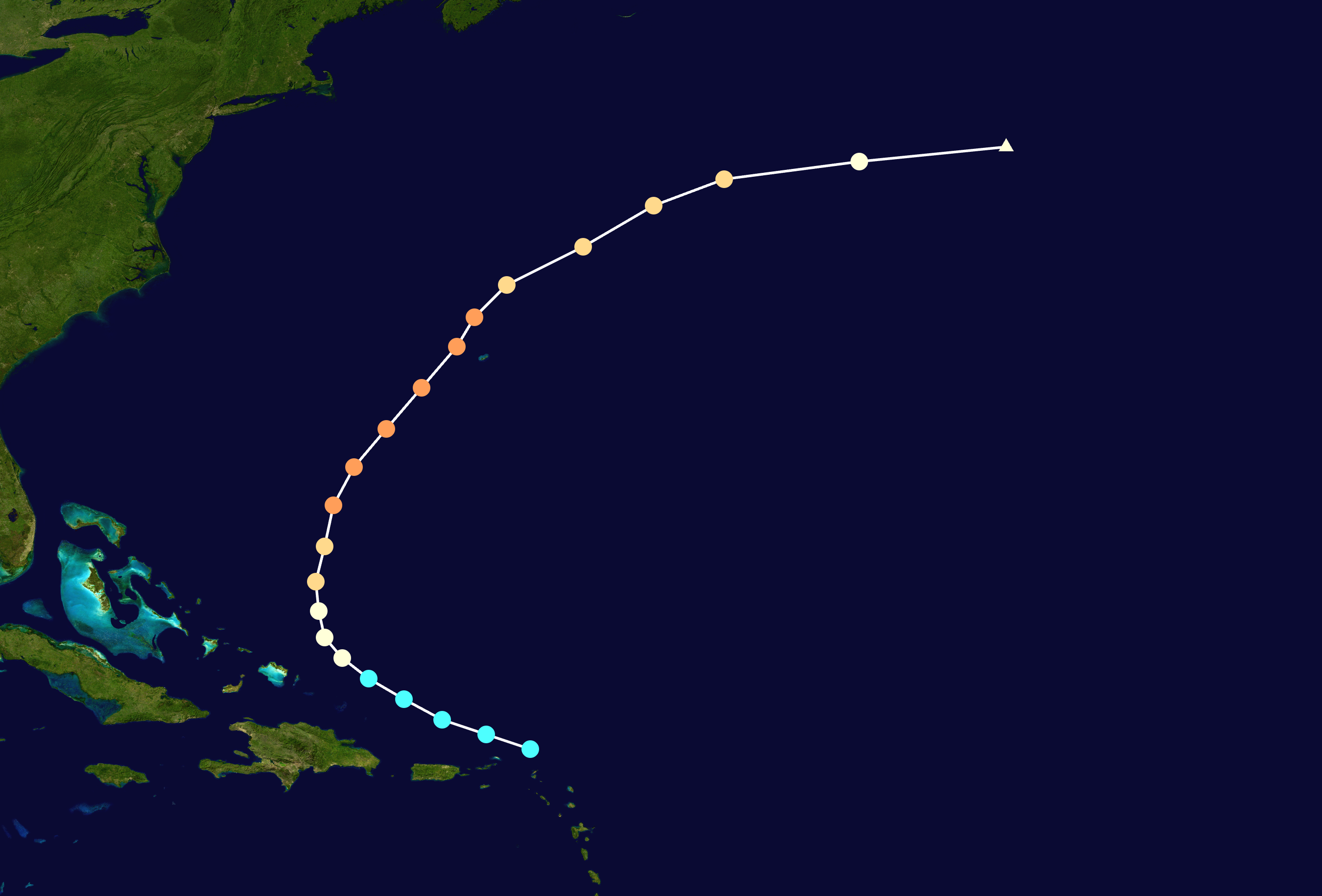
- Duration: October 17 – October 22
- Peak intensity: 120 mph (195 km/h) (1-min); 961 mbar (hPa)

The tenth and final tropical storm of the season likely developed from a tropical wave just north of the Leeward Islands early on October 17. The storm, designated as "Love" in real time by the United States Air Force, moved west-northwestward and re-curved to the northwest, avoiding landfall in the Leeward Islands, the Greater Antilles, and the Bahamas. Around 06:00 UTC on October 18, Love intensified into a Category 1 hurricane, shortly before beginning to move northward. Early the following day, the cyclone strengthened into a Category 2 hurricane while re-curving to the north-northeast. Upon reaching Category 3 intensity around 12:00 UTC on October 19, Love became the second major hurricane of the season. About six hours later, the storm attained maximum sustained winds of 120 mph (190 km/h), estimated based on averaging-out sustained wind speeds by a reconnaissance aircraft. On October 19, Hurricane Love became the first storm to be flown into at the low-levels by the 53d Weather Reconnaissance Squadron.

Around 12:00 UTC on October 20, the hurricane passed close to Bermuda. The island reported sustained winds of 100 mph (160 km/h) and gusts up to 126 mph (203 km/h). Winds downed many tree limbs and damaged crops, especially bananas and tomatoes. Winds also toppled electrical and telephone wires, leaving Hamilton without those services for several days. Ten buildings were destroyed, though little damage occurred to structures with Bermuda's standard building codes. The hurricane sank 11 boats in the vicinity of the island. Overall, 10 people were injured and damaged totaled over $1 million. Late on October 20, a reconnaissance aircraft flight observed a barometric pressure of 961 mbar (28.4 inHg), the lowest in association with the hurricane. Early the following day, Love weakened to a Category 2 hurricane. The cyclone then accelerated and curved east-northeastward late on October 21. At 00:00 UTC on October 22, the storm weakened to a Category 1 hurricane and transitioned into an extratropical cyclone about six hours later while situated about 575 mi (925 km) southeast of Newfoundland. The remnants were soon absorbed by a larger extratropical storm.

=== Other systems ===
Several other tropical depressions developed throughout the season. The first formed over the Bay of Campeche near the southeast coast of Mexico by June 13. By the following day, the depression either dissipated over moved rapidly northeastward ahead of a cold front and was last noted in the northeastern Gulf of Mexico. On September 1, another tropical depression formed offshore The Carolinas from a low pressure area that detached from a frontal system. The depression moved northward and merged with another frontal system on the following day. A tropical wave developed into a tropical depression south of the Capo Verde Islands on September 15. The depression tracked slowly west-northwestward for several days, before turning northeastward on September 23. Thereafter, the depression began moving erratically, with multiple small cyclonic loops from September 24 to September 28, before curving northward and then northeastward. By September 30, the depression became extratropical while well southwest of the Azores. The next tropical depression developed from a low which formed along either a trough or decaying front to the northeast of the Lesser Antilles on October 25. However, the depression transitioned into an extratropical cyclone by the following day. The final tropical cyclone of the season developed just north of Martinique on November 28. The depression moved westward and then curved northwestward, passing near the eastern tip of the Dominican Republic on November 30. Early the following day, the depression was absorbed by a cold front to the northeast of the Turks and Caicos Islands.

== Storm names ==
The Air Weather Service used the Joint Army/Navy Phonetic Alphabet to name cyclones that attained at least tropical storm status in the North Atlantic in 1947. This was the first season in which tropical storms in the basin were operationally assigned names; however, the use of these names was limited to internal communications between weather centers and aircraft, not in public bulletins. Further, these names are not listed in HURDAT. The following table shows which names were or were not used:

- Able (extratropical)
- Baker
- Charlie
- Dog
- Easy
- Fox
- George
- How
- Item
- Jig (probably extratropical)
- King
- Love
- Mike (unused)
- Nancy (unused)
- Oboe (unused)
- Peter (unused)
- Queen (unused)
- Roger (unused)
- Sugar (unused)
- Tare (unused)
- Uncle (unused)
- Victor (unused)
- William (unused)
- Xray (unused)
- Yoke (unused)
- Zebra (unused)

== Season effects ==
This is a table of all of the tropical cyclones that formed in the 1947 Atlantic hurricane season. It includes their name, duration, peak classification and intensities, areas affected, damage, and death totals. Deaths in parentheses are additional and indirect (an example of an indirect death would be a traffic accident), but were still related to that storm. Damage and deaths include totals while the storm was extratropical, a wave, or a low, and all of the damage figures are in 1947 USD.

Saffir–Simpson scale
TD	TS	C1	C2	C3	C4	C5

1947 North Atlantic tropical cyclone season statistics
Storm name	Dates active	Storm category at peak intensity	Max 1-min wind mph (km/h)	Min. press. (mbar)	Areas affected	Damage (US$)	Deaths	Ref(s).
Depression	June 13–14	Tropical depression	N/A	1003	Mexico	None	0	
One	July 31 – August 2	Tropical storm	50 (85)	1001	Mexico, Texas	$2 million	0	
Two	August 9–16	Category 2 hurricane	110 (175)	977	Mexico	Unknown	48	
Three	August 18–27	Category 1 hurricane	80 (130)	984	Cuba, Louisiana, Texas	$800 thousand	1	
Depression	September 1–2	Tropical depression	N/A	N/A	None	None	0	
Four	September 4–20	Category 4 hurricane	145 (230)	938	The Bahamas, Florida, Louisiana, Mississippi	$160.2 million	51	
Five	September 7–8	Tropical storm	60 (95)	N/A	United States Gulf Coast	None	0	
Depression	September 15–30	Tropical depression	N/A	N/A	None	None	0	
Six	September 20–24	Tropical storm	65 (100)	985	Cayman Islands, Cuba, Florida, Georgia	$100 thousand	0	
Seven	October 7–9	Tropical storm	60 (95)	1000	Florida, Georgia	$100 thousand	0	
Eight	October 8–11	Tropical storm	60 (95)	1001	None	None	0	
Nine	October 8–16	Category 2 hurricane	105 (165)	965	Cuba, Florida, The Bahamas, Georgia, South Carolina	$3.26 million	1	
Ten	October 17–22	Category 3 hurricane	120 (195)	961	Bermuda	$1 million	0	
Depression	October 25–26	Tropical depression	N/A	N/A	None	None	0	
Depression	November 28 – December 1	Tropical depression	N/A	N/A	Lesser Antilles, Dominican Republic	None	0	
Season aggregates
15 systems	June 13 – December 1		145 (230)	938		$183.2 million	101	

== See also ==
- 1947 Pacific hurricane season
- 1947 Pacific typhoon season
- 1900–1950 South-West Indian Ocean cyclone seasons
- 1940s Australian region cyclone seasons
- 1940s South Pacific cyclone seasons
