= Heaven Cent =

1988 novel by Piers Anthony

- First edition
- Author: Piers Anthony
- Cover artist: Darrell K. Sweet
- Language: English
- Genre: Fantasy
- Publisher: Avon Books
- Publication date: October 1988
- Publication place: United States
- Media type: Print (Paperback)
- Pages: 322 (paperback 1st printing)
- ISBN: 0-380-75288-3
- OCLC: 18529375
- Preceded by: Vale of the Vole
- Followed by: Man from Mundania

Heaven Cent is a fantasy novel by American writer Piers Anthony, the eleventh book of the Xanth series. It is the second book of a trilogy beginning with Vale of the Vole and ending with Man from Mundania.

== Plot introduction ==
The protagonist of Heaven Cent is Prince Dolph, shapeshifting son of King Dor and Queen Irene and younger brother of Princess Ivy. The story begins with Dolph, a pre-teen, setting out on a Quest with his designated Adult Companion Marrow Bones to locate the magician Humfrey, who had been missing since Vale of the Vole.

== Plot summary ==
The story begins with Prince Dolph lying in his sister, Ivy's, bed watching her magical tapestry which shows images from the past and present of Xanth. Dolph is the son of King Dor and Queen Irene, and he has the powerful talent of being able to shapeshift, giving him the power to change into any animal he chooses. While watching the images of the magical tapestry Dolph begins to think about the disappearance of the Good Magician Humphrey. Dolph gets so enraptured with the thought of finding the Magician that he eventually asks his father and mother permission to set out on a quest to find the answers. Queen Irene decides that Dolph is at a fine age to set out for a quest, but as long as he takes with him an adult companion. After some debate and arguing over who should accompany Dolph, Dolph suggests that Marrow Bones accompany him. Marrow is a walking, talking skeleton who has the ability to transform his skeletal body into many shapes as long as Dolph gives him a good kick in the tail bone first.

Once Dolph and Marrow set out on their journey they realize their first stop must be at the Good Magician Humfrey's castle to investigate for any clues to his disappearance. Once in the castle Dolph and Marrow find a hidden room that can only be viewed through a clear rock from above. In the hidden room is a message that reads "Skeleton Key to Heaven Cent". Marrow distinguishes that there is a pun in the message, and a Skeleton Key is really an island made of coral. So Dolph and Marrow set out to find the isle and find the Heaven Cent to bring back the Good Magician Humphrey.

Throughout Dolph and Marrow's adventures through the land of Xanth they encounter many different creatures. There are the always rhyming ogres, bone hungry and smelly harpies, the cruel merwomen, and many others. One of the major creatures that come into play in the book are the nagas. The nagas are a snake-human people who have the power to transform into either a full snake, full human, or mixed form. Dolph and Marrow encounter the nagas when trying to get through a goblin kingdom where the goblins are holding Nada, the naga princess, prisoner. After rescuing Nada, Dolph and Marrow return to the naga kingdom, where Dolph, even though too young, becomes unintentionally betrothed to Nada through a naga tradition. Nada joins Dolph and Marrow on their quest to find the Heaven Cent, and their romantic relationship blossoms until Nada reveals to Dolph that she is actually many years older than he is. Although Dolph is taken aback by this information, his love for Nada does not waver and he keeps the betrothal intact.

When Dolph, Marrow, and Nada finally find the right island where the Heaven Cent is supposed to be they encounter a magical castle where a maiden has been under a magical sleep for 900 years of a 1000-year sentence. The sleeping maiden is named Electra, and she was put under the sleeping spell because 900 years ago she accidentally activated the Heaven Cent. Dolph kisses the sleeping Electra and awakens her, but to Dolph's surprise Electra cannot survive unless she marries the person who broke the spell on her.

Once the entire party returns to Castle Roogna Dolph is left with the decision about what to do with his two betrothed women. After much debate with both women and the King and Queen, Dolph asks for the test of the roses. Dolph chooses the yellow rose for Electra showing friendship and the red rose for Nada representing love. Electra is the first of the betrothed to attempt the test and she quickly chooses the red rose for Dolph representing love. Nada goes second and tries to pick the red rose, but she cannot because she does not truly love him and she is pricked by a rose. Nada then tries to pick a black rose and commit suicide, but Dolph jumps over to her and stops her. Dolph explains that he loves Nada even though the love is not returned. In the end Dolph remains betrothed to each girl even though the King and Queen do not believe in it, but Dolph and the girls believe that, in the next seven years before Dolph can marry, they will work out all the problems.

== The Test of the Roses ==
The test of the roses is when one person stands in the center of a garden of different colored roses. Each rose color stands for a different emotion: white for indifference, yellow for friendship, pink for romance, red for love, and black for death. The person being decided over stands on a pillar in the middle of the garden, then the person trying to show their emotions walks around the garden and picks the appropriate colored rose for how they feel about the person in the middle of the garden.
