= Time travel in fiction =

Concept and accompanying genre in fiction

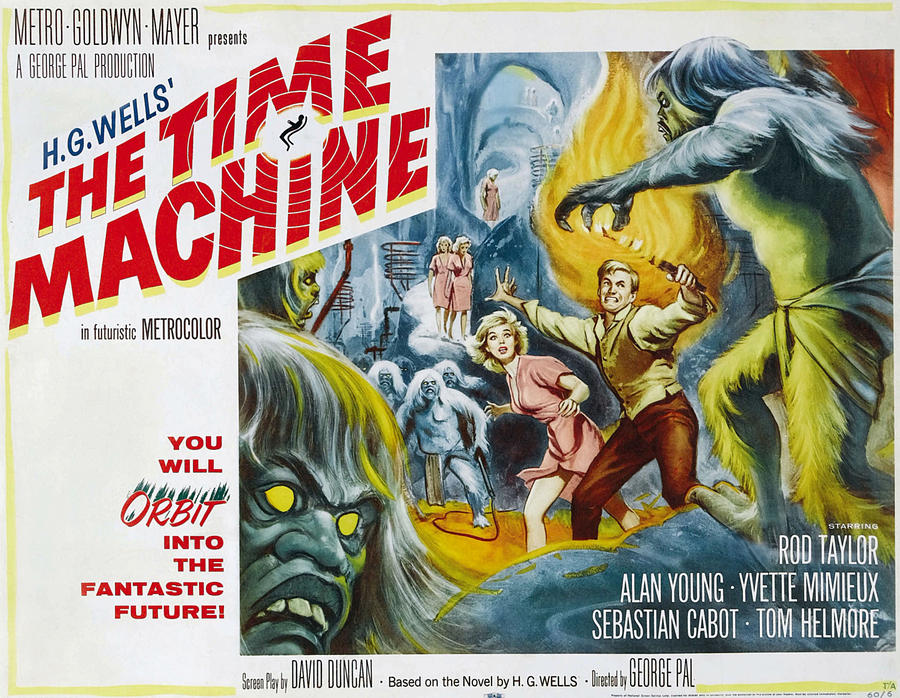
Poster for the 1960 film adaptation of H. G. Wells' 1895 novella The Time Machine

Time travel is a common theme or trope in science fiction and possibly other speculative fiction, mainly since the late 19th century, and has been depicted in a variety of media, such as literature, television, and film. This genre is sometimes called time-travel fiction, chrono fiction, temporal fiction or chrono opera.

The concept of time travel by mechanical means was popularized in H. G. Wells' 1895 story, The Time Machine. In general, time travel stories focus on the consequences of traveling into the past or the future. The premise for these stories often involves changing history, either intentionally or by accident, and the ways by which altering the past changes the future and creates an altered present or future for the time traveler upon their return. In other instances, the premise is that the past cannot be changed or that the future is determined, and the protagonist's actions turn out to be inconsequential or intrinsic to events as they originally unfolded. Some stories focus solely on the paradoxes and alternate timelines that come with time travel, rather than time traveling. They often provide some sort of social commentary, as time travel provides a "necessary distancing effect" that allows science fiction to address contemporary issues in metaphorical ways.

== Mechanisms ==
Time travel in modern fiction is sometimes achieved by space and time warps, stemming from the scientific theory of general relativity. Stories from antiquity often featured time travel into the future through a time slip brought on by traveling or sleeping, in other cases, time travel into the past through supernatural means, for example brought on by angels or spirits.

=== Time slip ===
A time slip is a plot device in fantasy and science fiction in which a person, or group of people, seem to travel through time by unknown means. The idea of a time slip has been used in 19th century fantasy, an early example being Washington Irving's 1819 Rip Van Winkle, where the mechanism of time travel is an extraordinarily long sleep. Mark Twain's 1889 A Connecticut Yankee in King Arthur's Court had considerable influence on later writers. The first novel to include both travel to the past and travel to the future and return to the present is the Charles Dickens 1843 novel A Christmas Carol.

Time slip is one of the main plot devices of time travel stories, another being a time machine. The difference is that in time slip stories, the protagonist typically has no control and no understanding of the process (which is often never explained at all). They are either left marooned in a past or future time and must make the best of it, or are eventually returned by a process as unpredictable and uncontrolled as the journey out. The plot device is also popular in children's literature. The 2011 film, Midnight in Paris similarly presents time travel as occurring without explanation, as the director "eschews a 'realist' internal logic that might explain the time travel, while also foregoing experimental time Distortion techniques, in favor of straightforward editing and a fantastical narrative set-up".

=== Time portal ===
A time portal or a time gate is a doorway in time, employed in various fiction genres, especially science fiction and fantasy, to transport characters to the past or future. They differ from time machines in being a permanent or semi-permanent fixture, often linking specific points in time. An influential example of such a work is the short story, "By His Bootstraps", by Robert A. Heinlein, which features a time gate built by aliens and plays with some of the inherent paradoxes that would be caused by time travel.

=== Communication from the future ===
In literature, communication from the future is a plot device in some science fiction and fantasy stories. Forrest J. Ackerman noted in his 1973 anthology of the best fiction of the year that "the theme of getting hold of tomorrow's newspaper is a recurrent one". An early example of this device can be found in H. G. Wells's 1932 short story "The Queer Story of Brownlow's Newspaper", which tells the tale of a man who receives such a paper from 40 years in the future. The 1944 film It Happened Tomorrow also employs this device, with the protagonist receiving the next day's newspaper from an elderly colleague (who is possibly a ghost). Ackerman's anthology also highlights a 1972 short story by Robert Silverberg, "What We Learned from this Morning's Newspaper". In that story, a block of homeowners wake to discover that on November 22, they have received The New York Times for the coming December 1. As characters learn of future events affecting them through a newspaper delivered a week early, the ultimate effect is that this "so upsets the future that spacetime is destroyed". The television series Early Edition, similar to the film It Happened Tomorrow, also revolved around a character who daily received the next day's newspaper, and sought to change some event therein forecast to happen.

A newspaper from the future can be a fictional edition of a real newspaper, or an entirely fictional newspaper. John Buchan's 1932 novel The Gap in the Curtain, is similarly premised on a group of people being enabled to see, for a moment, an item in The Times newspaper from one year in the future. During the Swedish general election of 2006, the Swedish liberal party used election posters which looked like news items, called Framtidens nyheter ("News of the future"), featuring a future Sweden that had become what the party wanted.

A communication from the future raises questions about the ability of humans to control their destiny. The 2009 visual novel Steins;Gate as well as its 2011 Anime adaptation incorporates the concept of sending text messages to the past as a major story element. It is referred to by the characters as "D-Mail" (short for "DeLorean Mail") and can send up to 36 bytes of data to any device capable of receiving text messages in the past. While not being the only element of time travel within the story of Steins;Gate, a text message sent to the past acts as the inciting incident for the narrative. The characters find their problems are exacerbated due to not knowing how individuals in the past will actually utilize the information.

=== Precognition ===
Precognition has been explored as a form of time travel in fiction. Author J. B. Priestley wrote of it both in fiction and non-fiction, analysing testimonials of precognition and other "temporal anomalies" in his book Man and Time. His books include time travel to the future through dreaming, which upon waking up results in memories from the future. Such memories, he writes, may also lead to the feeling of déjà vu, that the present events have already been experienced, and are now being re-experienced. Infallible precognition, which describes the future as it truly is, may lead to causal loops, one form of which is explored in Newcomb's paradox. The film 12 Monkeys heavily deals with themes of predestination and the Cassandra complex, where the protagonist who travels back in time explains that he can't change the past.

The protagonist of the short story Story of Your Life, later adapted into the film, Arrival, experiences life as a superimposition of the present and the totality of her life, future included, as a consequence of learning an alien language. The mental faculty is speculation based on the Sapir–Whorf hypothesis.

=== Time loop ===
A "time loop" or "temporal loop" is a plot device in which periods of time are repeated and re-experienced by the characters, and there is often some hope of breaking out of the cycle of repetition. Time loops are sometimes referred to as causal loops, but these two concepts are distinct. Although similar, causal loops are unchanging and self-originating, whereas time loops are constantly resetting. In a time loop when a certain condition is met, such as a death of a character or a clock reaching a certain time, the loop starts again, with one or more characters retaining the memories from the previous loop. Stories with time loops commonly center on the character learning from each successive loop through time.

=== Experiencing time in reverse ===
In some media, certain characters are presented as moving through time backwards. This is a very old concept, with some accounts asserting that English mythological figure Merlin lived backwards, and appeared to be able to prophesy the future because for him it was a memory. This tradition has been reflected in certain modern fictional accounts of the character. In the Piers Anthony book Bearing an Hourglass, the second of eight books in the Incarnations of Immortality series, the character of Norton becomes the incarnation of Time and continues his life living backwards in time. The 2016 film Doctor Strange has the character use the Time Stone, one of the Infinity Stones in the Marvel Cinematic Universe, to reverse time, experiencing time backwards while so doing.

In the film Tenet, characters time travel without jumping back, but by experiencing past reality in reverse, and at the same speed, after going through a 'turnstile' device and until they revert to normal time flow by going through such a device again. In the meantime, two versions of the time traveller coexist (and must not meet, lest they mutually destruct): the one that had been 'traveling forward' (existing normally) until entering a turnstile and the one traveling backward from the turnstile. The laws of thermodynamics are reversed for time traveling people and objects, so that for example backward travel requires the use of a respirator. Objects left behind by time travellers obey 'reverse thermodynamics;' for example, bullets shot or even simply deposited while traveling backward fly back into (forward traveling) guns.

== Themes ==
=== Time paradox ===
The idea of changing the past is logically contradictory, creating situations like the grandfather paradox, where time travellers go back in time and change the past in a way that affects their future in a way that could be seen as paradoxical or illogical, such as by killing their grandparents. The engineer Paul J. Nahin states that "even though the consensus today is that the past cannot be changed, science fiction writers have used the idea of changing the past for good story effect". Time travel to the past and precognition without the ability to change events may result in causal loops.

The possibility of characters changing the past gave rise to the idea of "time police", people who prevent such changes from occurring by engaging in time travel to reverse the changes.

==== Alternative future, history, timelines, and dimensions ====
An alternative future or alternate future is a possible future that never comes to pass, typically when someone travels into the past and alters it so that the events of the alternative future cannot occur or when a communication from the future to the past effected a change that alters the future. Alternative histories may exist "side by side", with the time traveller arriving at different dimensions as he changes time.

==== Butterfly effect ====
The butterfly effect is the notion that small events can have large, widespread consequences. The term describes events observed in chaos theory where a very small change in initial conditions has vastly different results. The term was coined by mathematician Edward Lorenz years after the phenomenon was first described.

The butterfly effect has found its way into popular imagination. For example, in Ray Bradbury's 1952 short story A Sound of Thunder, the killing of an insect millions of years in the past drastically changes the world and in the 2004 film The Butterfly Effect, the protagonist's small changes to his past results in extreme consequences.

=== Time tourism ===
A "distinct subgenre" of stories explore time travel as a means of tourism, with travelers curious to visit periods or events such as the Victorian Era or the Crucifixion of Christ, or to meet historical figures such as Abraham Lincoln or Ludwig van Beethoven. This theme can be addressed from two or three directions. An early example of present-day tourists travelling back to the past is Ray Bradbury's 1952 A Sound of Thunder, in which the protagonists are big game hunters who travel to the distant past to hunt dinosaurs. An early example of another type, in which tourists from the future visit the present, is Catherine L. Moore and Henry Kuttner's 1946 Vintage Season. The final type in which there are people time-traveling to the future is experienced in the second book of Douglas Adams' The Hitchhiker's Guide to the Galaxy series, The Restaurant at the End of the Universe, which, as the title indicates, includes a restaurant that exists at the end of the universe. In the restaurant, people time-traveling from all over the space-time continuum (especially the rich) came to the restaurant to view the explosion of the universe put on repeat.

=== Time war ===
The Encyclopedia of Science Fiction describes a time war as a fictional war that is "fought across time, usually with each side knowingly using time travel ... to establish the ascendancy of one or another version of history". Time wars are also known as "change wars" and "temporal wars". Examples include Clifford D. Simak's 1951 Time and Again, Russell T. Davies' 2005 revival of Doctor Who, Barrington J. Bayley's 1974 The Fall of Chronopolis, Matthew Costello's 1990 Time of the Fox, and the central premise of Star Trek: Enterprise.

=== Ghost story ===
Researcher Barbara Bronlow wrote that traditional ghost stories are in effect an early form of time travel, since they depict living people of the present interacting with (dead) people of the past. She noted as an instance that Christopher Marlow's Doctor Faustus called up Helen of Troy and met her arising from her grave.

== See also ==
- Eternal return
- List of films featuring time loops
- List of time travel works of fiction
- Time machine
- Time slip
- Time viewer
