= Annihilation Factor =

1972 novel by Barrington J. Bayley

- First edition
- Author: Barrington J. Bayley
- Cover artist: Peter Lloyd
- Language: English
- Genre: Science fiction
- Publisher: Ace Books
- Publication date: 1972
- Publication place: United States
- Media type: Print (Paperback)
- Pages: 134

Annihilation Factor is the second science fiction novel by Barrington J. Bayley, expanded from a 1964 short story ("The Patch") originally published in New Worlds. It centres on the strains placed on a galactic empire by the appearance of the mysterious, planet-devouring "patch".

== Literary significance and reception ==
Rhys Hughes describes the novel as stronger than The Star Virus but "dated" and conventional, noting that the primary distinguishing feature comes from Bayley's decision to concentrate on the pressures of the disaster rather than its physical effects. He also remarks on the alienating effect of Bayley's downbeat ending.

John Clute described Annihilation Factor, along with Empire of Two Worlds and Collision Course, as "variously successful".
