= Lilith in popular culture =

Figure in Jewish mythology

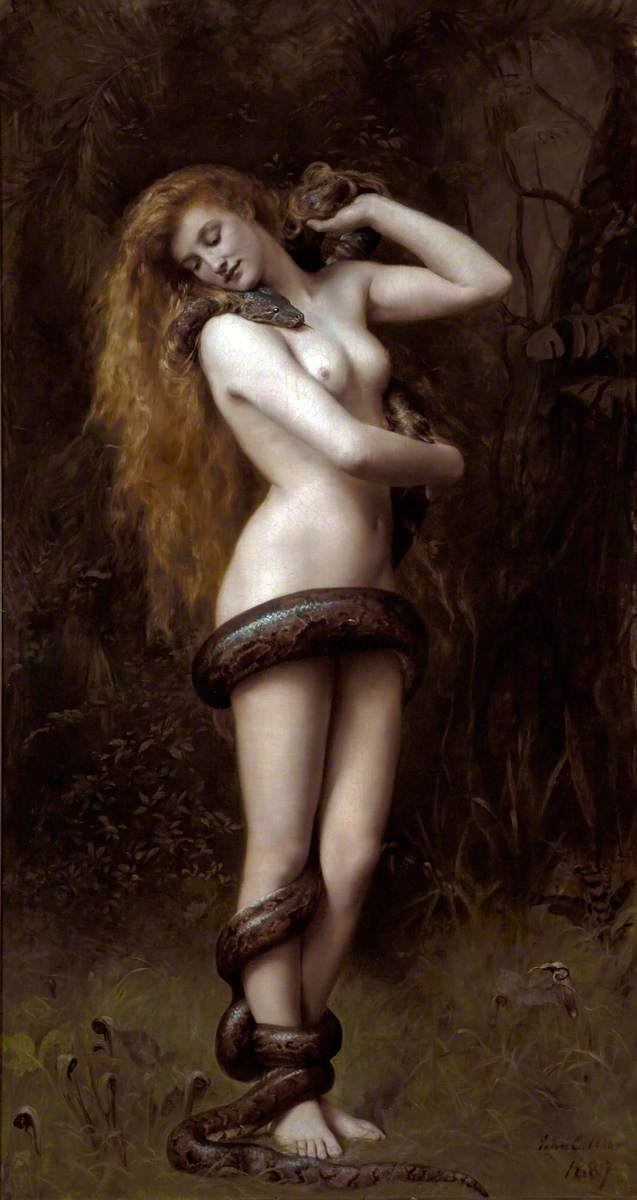
Lilith (1887) by John Collier

Lilith, a character suggested to be Adam's first wife and a significant female figure from Jewish mythology, has been developed over time into distinct characters in popular culture. One writer on witches, Judika Illes, wrote, "No spirit exerts more fascination over media and popular culture than Lilith. Her appearances are genuinely too numerous to count." Lilith is one of several figures with biblical or related origins integrated into popular culture who have been titled demon.

== Books ==
- Lilith (1895), novel by George MacDonald. MacDonald's Christian allegory was an influence on both C.S. Lewis and J.R.R. Tolkien. MacDonald takes an ultimately positive view of Lilith.
- Lilith: A Dramatic Poem (1919) was an acclaimed fantasy verse drama by George Sterling.
- The March 1973 issue of the Warren magazine, Eerie, contains a story written by Nick Cuti titled "Lilith", illustrated by Jaime Brocal. The story is based on the medieval stories of Lilith being Adam's first wife. This story has several interesting turns, such as the Archangel Gabriel being substituted for Samael.
- Lilith is a principal character in Stephen Brust's To Reign in Hell (1984), where she is the love interest of both Satan and Lucifer at varying points.
- In The Chronicles of Narnia by C.S. Lewis, the White Witch (the main antagonist of The Lion, the Witch, and the Wardrobe) is said to be a descendant of Lilith, referred to as Adam's first wife.
- In Piers Anthony's Incarnations of Immortality series of fantasy novels, a demoness named Lilith appears in For Love of Evil (1988) and Under a Velvet Cloak (2007).
- C. L. Moore's 1940 story "Fruit of Knowledge" is written from Lilith's point of view. It is a re-telling of the Fall of Man as a love triangle between Lilith, Adam and Eve – with Eve's eating the forbidden fruit being in this version the result of misguided manipulations by the jealous Lilith, who had hoped to get her rival discredited and destroyed by God and thus regain Adam's love.
- In Cassandra Clare's young-adult fantasy series The Mortal Instruments (2007–2014), Lilith is depicted as the mother of demons and said to be the first wife of Adam in the garden of Eden.
- In Jaye Wells' urban paranormal Sabina Kane novels, Lilith is the Queen of Hell and wife of Asmodeus, and the mother of the vampire and mage races. While Lilith makes only brief cameos in the first four books, the prophecy of her return drives the central plot of the series, and she is a major character in the fifth novel.
- Lilith is resurrected in Kevin R. Given's Last Rites: The Return of Sebastian Vasilis, which is book one in the Karl Vincent: Vampire Hunter series. She, along with the Egyptian goddess Sekhmet and Hindu goddess Kali, form a female trinity bent on destroying mankind and taking over the earth.
- Lilith appears in the 40th issue of Neil Gaiman's The Sandman series from DC Comics' Vertigo imprint. She is later present in several issues of the Lucifer comic book series, where she is found to be the mother of Mazikeen. She was the first wife of Adam, who, when rejected by Adam and God for being a person in her own right, slept with many (if not all) of the angels to give birth to the first demons, who she organized into building the Silver City.
- In Simon R. Green's Nightside series, Lilith is the main hero's mother.
- One of the two characters named Lilith in the Marvel Universe was an ancient demon goddess and the mother of the Lilin.
- In José Saramago's 2009 novel Cain – the writer's highly irreverent reworking of the Bible – Lilith is a human being, the wanton Queen of an early Mesopotamian city-state. Cain comes there during his wanderings after killing his brother Abel, becomes Lilith's lover, survives an assassination attempt by Lilith's ineffective husband Noah, and begets Enoch with Lilith.
- In Qui Nguyen's 2011 play, She Kills Monsters, Lilith is the name of the demon queen character representing Tilly's girlfriend in her Dungeons & Dragons campaign.
- In Larissa Ione's book series The Lords of Deliverance, Lilith is the mother of the Four Horsemen of the Apocalypse.
- In the Stargate Atlantis spin-off novel Blood Ties, Lilith is an ancient researcher from Atlantis who became obsessed with defeating the Ori, to the point of insanity. She created the creatures of mythology, most of whom died out in the Great Flood. However, her incubi, succubi, and cambions survived and are the main enemies of the novel. One of the factions of these creatures is called the Lilith after her.
- In the Andrzej Sapkowski's book series The Witcher, Lilith appears as a powerful demon associated with the end of the world. She is also mentioned in the TV adaptation
- In Vipin Das's Malayalam novel 'Anahi', Lilith is mentioned as a fallen angel who revolted against God and was banished from Heaven to be imprisoned for eternity.
- Lilith appears in Barry Reese's universe of works as Adam's first wife and "Mother of Monsters" who is immortal and leads a group called The Crimson Ladies helping women and fighting evil. She first appears in The Adventures of Lazarus Gray, v11 (2022) then gets her own novel, The Chronicles of Lilith (2022).
- Lilith appears in H. P. Lovecraft's 1925 short story "The Horror at Red Hook".

== Television, film, and music ==
- Lilith appears in One Step Beyond, season 3, episode 16 "Midnight".
- In the Netflix series First Kill, Lilith was-according to vampires-voluntarily bitten by the snake in the garden of Eden. This turned her into a vampire whose descendants are born vampires, with extra-vampire powers compared to ex-human vampires. Eve did not allow herself to be bitten and was "punished" by God to live as, and bear mere human offspring.
- The character Leeloo in the movie The Fifth Element, a futuristic fantasy, turns the concept of Lilith on its head by saving humanity instead of devouring it. Leeloo is depicted as fair-skinned and with strawberry blonde hair, young and lithe, similar or identical to the romantic era paintings. Leeloo is represented as the original woman (first wife of Adam) and is born speaking the "Divine Language".
- In the 2019 film K-12, Lilith appears several times as almost a guardian angel to the main character Crybaby and her friends. Importantly she only helps them because they have magical powers similar to hers, her form of helping mainly consists of killing enemies of Crybaby's.
- The Lilith myth is the subject of the episode "Lilith: Queen of the Night" from the third season of the Canadian documentary series The Naked Archaeologist.
- Lilith appears in Hazbin Hotel. She is the ex-wife (first wife) of Adam, the first human, wife of Lucifer, queen of hell, and mother of Charlie.
- In the TV series Supernatural, a white-eyed and very powerful demon called Lilith appears in seasons 3 and 4, played by a variety of young girls she was possessing, and later Katherine Boecher and Katie Cassidy. She is said to be the first human ever tempted into Lucifer's service, thus becoming the first demon. In the season 4 finale, it is revealed that she is also the last of the 66 seals, and when she is killed by Sam Winchester, Lucifer is unleashed from his cage.
- The italian rapper Kid Yugi named track 6 of his sophomore album I Nomi Del Diavolo after the mythological figure.
- In the 2012 Scooby-Doo! Mystery Incorporated episode "Night on Haunted Mountain", the main villainess was a flying phantom which is named Dark Lilith and protects a mountain named Mount Diabla.
- Lilith is the subject of the 1990 horror film Night Angel. Originally titled Lilith in the spec screenplay by Joe Augustyn, it was the first feature film to incorporate the ancient legend of Lilith.
- The horror movie 30 Days of Night: Dark Days features a vampire called Lilith.
- In the 2009 film Evil Angel, the Lilith legend is examined while investigating murder sprees that may be related to demonic possession.
- In the 2009 comedy movie Year One, Lilith is represented as the daughter of Adam, sister of Abel and Cain, and a lesbian.
- Lilith features in the occult-themed lyrics of several metal bands. American industrial rock band Machines of Loving Grace's 1993 album Concentration contains the song "Lilith/Eve" that is based on the legend. Swedish black metal band Dissection's 2006 album Reinkaos has a song called "Dark Mother Divine" which refers to Lilith. British extreme metal band Cradle of Filth's 2010 concept album Darkly, Darkly, Venus Aversa focuses on Lilith. Deathcore band Chelsea Grin released a song called "Lilith" on their 2012 EP, Evolve. Therion's 2012 album Les Fleurs du Mal features the song "Lilith", and Lilith is referred to in "The Perennial Sophia" from their 2007 rock opera, Gothic Kabbalah. Lilith is also mentioned with respect to Eve in In This Moment's 2017 song "Oh Lord".
- Lilith Fair was a female centric music festival named after Lilith.
- Genesis's 1974 album The Lamb Lies Down On Broadway features the song "Lilywhite Lilith".
- First Mother (Lilith) by Silent Planet from the album The Night God Slept uses the myth of Lilith as referred to in the Talmud to discuss feminism via a conversation between Lilith, Eve, and Adam.
- Purge of Lilith, a metal band originating from Virginia, makes use of the name.
- The electronic producer Varien released the song "Lilith", which is about this legend.
- In the 2015 film The Chosen, Lilith is a demon that possesses children and takes them to hell if six blood relatives are not sacrificed. The film also refers to Lilith as being the first wife of Adam.
- In the crowd-funded streaming series The Chosen, Lilith is the name of Mary Magdalene when she first appears in episode one. She is demon possessed and it is implied that she has adopted the name of the demon that possesses her.
- In Zero, a 2016 South Indian Tamil fantasy-horror movie, Lilith, the 'first wife of Adam' is mentioned. She is said to have cursed the protagonist.
- In the 2001 opera, Lilith, following Adam's funeral, Eve returns to the ruined paradise of Eden and confronts Lilith, the notorious "other woman".
- In the TV sitcom Cheers and its sequel series Frasier, Lilith Sternin is Frasier Crane's wife and later ex-wife. Given her name by her Jewish parents, she is hinted at being related to the demoness Lilith by Frasier's brother, Niles.
- In the 1996 horror comedy Bordello of Blood, Lilith is portrayed as "the mother of all vampires", and the film's antagonist.
- In the 2004 movie Darklight, Lilith (portrayed by Shiri Appleby) has been stripped of her memory and powers and is living as an ordinary young woman. When an ambitious, evil scientist threatens the world, a secret society helps Lilith to regain her memories and to use her powers for good.
- In the TV series Femme Fatales, Lilith is the host who introduces each episode Rod Serling-style and occasionally appears within the narrative.
- In the mythology of the TV series True Blood, Lilith is known as the first vampire. According to vampiric history, God first created Lilith and subsequently created Adam and Eve to sustain her. Appearing as the main antagonist of season 5, Lilith meets her demise during the sixth season. A vial of her blood is kept by the Vampire Authority and is consumed by Bill Compton, allowing Lilith to possess him. She is portrayed by Jessica Clark.
- Lilith, played by Anna Hopkins, acts as the main villain for the third season of Shadowhunters. This version of Lilith is a Greater Demon and the first woman made by God who was cast into Hell for her disobedience. She refers to season two antagonist Jonathan Morgenstern as her son.
- In the TV series Once Upon a Time, Lilith is the daughter of Maleficent.
- In The Chilling Adventures of Sabrina, Lilith is merged with the character of Madam Satan played by Michelle Gomez in the series and serves as the main antagonist of the first season. She is referred to as "Satan's Concubine" and the mother of Demons, her ultimate goal is to groom Sabrina to take her place in Satan's army so she will sit beside him as the Queen of Hell.
- In Netflix's fourth season of Lucifer, the demon Mazikeen (Maze) refers to Lilith as the mother of demons, including herself. In the season five episode "It Never Ends Well for the Chicken", Lilith (portrayed by Lesley-Ann Brandt who also portrays Maze, as the younger Lilith), is performing as a singer in 1946 New York City. She is visited by Lucifer who helps her find her stolen ring. She gives up her immortality and Mazikeen, in the present day, encounters an elderly Lilith, played by L. Scott Caldwell. In season six, episode seven, Adam while talking with Maze mentions that he dated her mother, i.e. Lilith.
- In the Hulu original series, Into the Dark, the first season episode entitled "Pure" (2019), mentions Lilith. Several teenage girls at a Purity Retreat participate in a secret rite, and they start to see a supernatural entity (Lilith). The girls need to focus on the demon they have unleashed, as well as their fathers' expectations.
- In the Disney animated series The Owl House, the character of Lilith Clawthorne is a reference to Lilith.
- In 2021, Halsey's album If I Can't Have Love, I Want Power features a song called "Lilith".
- In 2021, WWE Superstar Alexa Bliss carried a demonic doll named "Lily" with her, a reference to Lilith.
- In the 2019 movie, She Never Died, the main character, Lacey (Olunike Adeliyi), reveals at the end of the movie that her name is really Lilith. She is under the control of an entity that is not visible to others. She declared that due to her need to "consume and destroy life, she could never have one of her own, even if she tried. She had a son a long time ago but she can not picture his face." She then asks the male entity at the end, "When will you be done with me?".
- In the 2022 British adult animated short film Lilith & Eve, Eve is shocked to learn she is not the first woman when Lilith introduces herself. Despite Adam's protests, Eve follows Lilith out of Eden to learn more about her.
- Lilith is the main subject of the song "Serpentine" by American-New Zealander musician Vana. In the song, Lilith is portrayed as a tempting seductress who turns Eve into one of her many serpent minions.
- Lilith is the name of the 2025 EP by Lilyisthatyou.

=== Anime and manga ===
- In the anime series Neon Genesis Evangelion – a show that makes many references to Jewish mysticism – Lilith is stated to be the second angel, the progenitor of the human race (who collectively form the 18th and final angel, Lilin). She is confined and impaled with the Lance of Longinus in order to keep her compliant to NERV/SEELE's goals. However, she is wrongly identified as Adam by everyone other than the three characters who secretly put Lilith's soul into a clone, creating the artificial human Rei Ayanami. In the Rebuild of Evangelion movie adaptation, Lilith is the second angel and progenitor of humanity kept under NERV headquarters, but NERV personnel all identify her as Lilith.
- The Path series about a cult worshipping The Light includes a woman named Lilith. Lilith claims she was the original visionary behind the religion, and the religion's known founder, Steve (also once her romantic partner) stole her visions to found the cult. Lilith is often seen in darkness on the show.
- There is a Digimon known as Lilithmon who is based on the mythic Lilith and is one of the Seven Great Demon Lords. The character's first anime appearance is in Digimon Fusion.
- In the manga Chrono Crusade, Lilith is the mother of Chrono and Aion. Lilith was turned into a replacement core for Pandemonium. At the end of the story, Aion beheads her, making clear his contempt for her. He further requests that it never be disclosed that Chrono and he are both humans turned into demons. In the penultimate chapter, Asmaria has a vision of a pregnant woman walking through the countryside when the ancestral demons came to Earth, and this woman happens to be Lilith.
- In the manga Monster Musume, Lilith is a mischievous lesser devil who hypnotizes the centaur Centorea to believe she must force herself onto Kimihito, the protagonist. An unexpected wild boar attack foils her plan and breaks the hypnosis, and Lilith is apprehended by Rachnera Arachnera.
- In High School DxD, the biblical Lilith was stated to be Adam's first wife who lived in the Garden of Eden in ancient times and was taken by the Devil King Lucifer as his consort. Lilith is also mentioned to have asexually gave birth to countless Devils including the first generation 72 Devil Nobles of the Ars Goetia and Extra Demons through demonic magic and rituals created by Lucifer.
- In the manga Hatsukoi Zombie, Ibusuki Ririsu (a transliteration of Lilith into Japanese) is inspired by and named after Lilith. She is separated from her love and replaced by an entity named Eve, in a direct reference to the story of Lilith.
- In the manga and anime series Hozuki's Coolheadedness, Lilith is shown as a she-devil from The West whose duty is seduction. She's also the first wife of Adam and a wife to Beelzebub, the chief of staff to the Western Hell's leader, Satan.
- In the manga and anime series Black Clover, Lilith is a high-ranking devil that emerges from the underworld. She appears alongside, and later fuses with Naamah.

== Games ==
- Lilith is a character in Darksiders and Darksiders II, a female demon-queen who created the Nephilim, angel-demon hybrids.
- Lilith appears as a playable succubus character in the Darkstalkers series.
- Lilith appears as the Queen of Darkness and mother of Kalma in Jade Cocoon 2, serving as the game's main antagonist. Upon collecting the four elemental orbs, Lilith's power seals the wormhole forests and claims several previously defeated Beasthunters as Disciples of Darkness. Kahu must enter her lair and purify the darkness within the heart of each Beasthunter before facing Lilith as the final boss. She appears as a giant insect-looking demon, Levant refers to her as The Devil.
- Lilith is the name of a playable character in the roleplaying/shooter game Borderlands. She reappears as a non-playable character in Borderlands 2, Borderlands 3, Borderlands: the Pre-sequel, and Borderlands 4.
- Lilith are a class of snake-woman demons who are a recurring enemy in the Final Fantasy series. In an expansion to Final Fantasy XI, Lady Lilith is a main antagonist.
- Lilith is a character in DmC: Devil May Cry. She is the mistress of the main antagonist, Mundus, and is fought as a boss alongside her unborn son.
- Lilith is a major antagonist in the Diablo franchise. She first appears in Diablo II: Lord of Destruction's Pandemonium Event, a multiplayer-only special quest. Her character is greatly expanded in the tie-in novels, which reveals that she is the niece of Diablo and is in fact the mother of humanity's forerunners, the nephalem. Lilith supplants her uncle as the primary antagonist of the series in Diablo IV.
- Lilith has several appearances in The Secret World, described as one of the first humans, and claims that she turned against her own species in favor of the Nephilim Samael. She claims to be the Mother of Monsters, but is considered human and her power stems from ancient artifacts.
- Lilith, the "Mother of Monsters", is one of the primary leaders in Malifaux.
- Lilith is a recurring enemy in the Castlevania series, and is usually a palette-swap of the series' Succubus enemy.
- Lilith, evolved from a succubus, is a 4-star healer in the Japanese mobile game, Puzzle & Dragons.
- The Megami Tensei series, containing several religious and mythological figures, has Lilith as a recurring demon, with some entries including her as a story-relevant character.
- Lilith is a powerful sorceress in the Madō Monogatari series, where she was the wife of Satan until she lost her physical body when using the artifact known as Seraphim Orb to create the Madou World, of which she is now the guardian. She is also very similar to the protagonist Arle.
- Lilith is one of three heroines in the visual novel Tokyo Babel.
- Lilith is the name of a planet, and the primary questing-destination, in the upcoming indie game Lilith 3218.
- Lilith is a character appearing the Vampire: The Masquerade line of game products originally published by White Wolf Games. In the game's fiction, she claims to be the first wife of Adam and teaches Caine how to use his vampiric powers.
- Lilith is a non-playable character in the mobile game "Obey Me!" Although never seen, she is often mentioned and is an important element to the story. She is also MC's distant ancestor.
- Lilith is one of the major antagonists in the Funcom MMORPG The Secret World; known as the Mother of All Monsters.
- Lilith is a playable character in the roguelike game The Binding of Isaac: Rebirth, added in the game's Afterbirth expansion.

== Characters named Lilith ==
See the disambiguation page for characters merely named Lilith, such as Lilith Sternin in Cheers and Frasier.
