= Star Winds =

1978 novel by Barrington J. Bayley

- First edition
- Author: Barrington J. Bayley
- Cover artist: David Bergen
- Language: English
- Genre: Science fiction
- Publisher: DAW Books
- Publication date: 1978
- Publication place: United States
- Media type: Print (Paperback)
- Pages: 191
- ISBN: 978-0-87997-384-1
- OCLC: 3990810

Star Winds is the ninth science fiction novel by Barrington J. Bayley. In the future Solar System of the novel, humans travel through space using solar sails and, as with much of Bayley's work, alchemy and other pseudosciences play a role alongside more conventional technology.

== Literary significance and reception ==
Rhys Hughes reviewed Star Winds and The Pillars of Eternity as "offbeat" but ultimately reworkings of earlier material.

Andrew Darlington noted that the reworked theme of alchemy (first seen in Empire of Two Worlds) was a significant element, and argued that the first half of the novel, dealing with the actual journey from Earth to Mars, was stronger than the second, which shifted to a galactic venue. Darlington suggested that Bayley's abandonment of his Martian setting may have been due to the influence of the Viking landings while the book was being written.

David Pringle observed that the distinctions between SF and fantasy were slight, but found the book still engaging.
