= The Forest of Peldain =

1985 novel by Barrington J. Bayley

- First edition
- Author: Barrington J. Bayley
- Cover artist: Ken W. Kelly
- Language: English
- Genre: Science fiction
- Publisher: DAW Books
- Publication date: August 1985
- Publication place: United States
- Media type: Print (Paperback)
- Pages: 223
- ISBN: 0-88677-068-8
- OCLC: 12433450

The Forest of Peldain is the twelfth science fiction novel by Barrington J. Bayley. Set on the water world of the Hundred Islands, the Arelian empire attempts to seize control of the last island, Peldain, which within its dense forests contains an independent kingdom and an ancient secret.

== Literary significance and reception ==
Rhys Hughes regarded Bayley as having "slackened off" after The Zen Gun, concluding that Vancean stylings of The Forest of Peldain were "not a sustainable effort."

Andy Robertson, reviewing the novel in Interzone, dismissed the book as "[a] fairly minor potboiler."
