= The Seed of Evil =

- First edition
- Author: Barrington J. Bayley
- Cover artist: John Harris
- Language: English
- Genre: Science fiction
- Publisher: Allison & Busby
- Publication date: 1979
- Publication place: United Kingdom
- Media type: Print (hardback & paperback)
- Pages: 175
- ISBN: 0-85031-322-8

The Seed of Evil is the second science fiction collection by Barrington J. Bayley. The book collects thirteen short stories published between 1962 and 1979, several of which are original to this volume.

== Contents ==
- "Sporting with the Chid" (1979)
- "The God Gun" (1979)
- "The Ship That Sailed the Ocean of Space" (1974, variant of "Fishing Trip" (1962))
- "The Radius Riders" (1962)
- "Man in Transit" (1972)
- "Wizard Wazo's Revenge" (1979)
- "The Infinite Searchlight" (1979)
- "Integrity" (1964)
- "Perfect Love" (1979)
- "The Countenance" (1964)
- "Life Trap" (1979)
- "Farewell, Dear Brother" (1964)
- "The Seed of Evil" (1973)

== Literary significance and reception ==
In a survey of Bayley's work, Rhys Hughes assessed several stories in the collection along with the collection as a whole. He reviewed "Integrity", a darkly comic satire about a libertarian who frees the cells of his body, as among Bayley's best work while the Ballardian "Man in Transit" was "less clever and more accessible". He thought that The Seed of Evil, being a retrospective of Bayley's early work, is weaker than The Knights of the Limits "but even these dazzle and delight". He cites "Farewell, Dear Brother" as being part of a body of work that contributed as much to the success of New Worlds as the more famous stories of Brian Aldiss and Thomas M. Disch.

Brian Stableford described "Sporting with the Chid" as "marvellously gruesome" and compared "The Seed of Evil" with Melmoth the Wanderer. However, he felt that few of the other stories matched those two, singling out "The Radius Riders," "The God Gun" and "The Infinite Searchlight". Stableford concluded that the best of the collection was the "simple but elegant" "Man in Transit". While admitting that The Seed of Evil was inferior to The Knight of the Limits, Stableford's verdict was that "[a] second-rate Bayley collection has as much to offer as most collections in this day and age."

In a blog post about Bayley, Alastair Reynolds commented that, in particular, "Sporting with the Chid" was "the product of a truly lunatic and unfettered mind," adding: "[s]how that one to the next person who says SF is undeserving of literary respectability..."
