= The Rod of Light =

1985 novel by Barrington J. Bayley

- First edition
- Author: Barrington J. Bayley
- Cover artist: Terry Oakes
- Language: English
- Genre: Science fiction
- Publisher: Methuen Publishing
- Publication date: October 1985
- Publication place: United Kingdom
- Media type: Print (Paperback)
- Pages: 193
- ISBN: 0-413-58160-8
- Preceded by: The Soul of the Robot

The Rod of Light is the thirteenth science fiction novel by Barrington J. Bayley and his only sequel (to 1974's The Soul of the Robot).

== Plot summary ==
The book continues the story of Jasperodus, who is now in conflict with Gargan, a ruthless robot attempting to make his own soul.

== Literary significance and reception ==
Rhys Hughes described the Jasperodus series as slighter than average for Bayley, covering ground more thoroughly explored in John Sladek's Roderick series. Similar opinions were expressed by John Clute in The Encyclopedia of Science Fiction.

Dave Langford reviewed The Rod of Light for White Dwarf #73, and stated that "Concepts by Jorge Luis Borges, action by Doc Smith, sense of humour Bayley's own."

Brian Stableford said that since the novel builds on the themes of The Soul of the Robot, it was less inventive than much of Bayley's work but "still a delight to read."
