= The Pillars of Eternity =

1982 novel by Barrington J. Bayley

- First edition
- Author: Barrington J. Bayley
- Cover artist: Wayne D. Barlowe
- Language: English
- Genre: Science fiction
- Publisher: DAW Books
- Publication date: March 1982
- Publication place: United Kingdom
- Media type: Print (paperback)
- Pages: 159
- ISBN: 978-0-87997-717-7

The Pillars of Eternity is the tenth novel by the science fiction author Barrington J. Bayley.

== Background ==
The protagonist is deformed space pilot Joachim Boaz, rescued from his homeworld by the Collonadist philosophers who replace his skeleton with a regenerating artificial endoskeleton and teach that all events are destined to repeat themselves throughout time. After suffering a major accident, kept alive by the endoskeleton, he has become confined to a spacesuit and seeks vengeance on the collonadists by attempting to alter the future, disproving their philosophy. His chance is granted when the Meirjain the Wanderer is rediscovered, a lost planet where gemstones capable of altering the flow of time can be found.

== Literary significance and reception ==
Rhys Hughes reviewed Star Winds and The Pillars of Eternity as "offbeat" but ultimately reworkings of earlier material.

John Clute characterised Bayley's later novels as taking "an orrery joy in the galaxies," adding that though Bayley's fans were never great in number, they remained loyal throughout his career.
