= The Grand Wheel =

1977 novel by Barrington J. Bayley

- First edition
- Author: Barrington J. Bayley
- Cover artist: Don Maitz
- Language: English
- Genre: Science fiction
- Publisher: DAW Books
- Publication date: August 1977
- Publication place: United Kingdom
- Media type: Print (Paperback)
- Pages: 176
- ISBN: 978-0-87997-318-6

The Grand Wheel is the eighth science fiction novel by Barrington J. Bayley. The novel follows Cheyne Scarne, a professor of "randomatics", as he is selected by the eponymous organization (which holds a galactic monopoly on games of chance) to represent humanity in a card game with infinitely varying rules. The name of the main character appears to be a reference to John Scarne.

== Literary significance and reception ==
Rhys Hughes, in his survey of Bayley's work, described The Grand Wheel as an "entertaining gambling novel" with a "seedy and elegant" atmosphere. Colin Greenland, writing in Foundation 18, received the novel negatively, saying that it had been produced for the market and "would have been old in 1957".
