= The Garments of Caean =

1976 novel by Barrington J. Bayley

- First edition
- Author: Barrington J. Bayley
- Cover artist: Jan Esteves
- Language: English
- Genre: Science fiction
- Publisher: Doubleday (text restored in DAW Books edition)
- Publication date: February 1976
- Publication place: United Kingdom
- Media type: Print (Hardcover, Paperback)
- Pages: 189 (206 in text restored edition)
- ISBN: 978-0-385-04397-7

The Garments of Caean is the seventh novel by the science fiction author Barrington J. Bayley. He described it as being his attempt to create a Vancian space opera.

== Plot ==
The main plot covers a journey to a crashed planet by a con-man, Rialto Mast and Peder Forbath, a knowledgeable sartorial. They seek to obtain items of fashion from a crashed ship, filled with items of clothing from the planet Caean. Due to the particular nature of the clothing -– so exquisite as to imbue the wearer with certain qualities – on Caean the skill of the designer is such that the title "supplants the functions of psychiatrist, priest, and molder of public opinion."

While scouring the wreckage, Peder finds a rare suit designed by the legendary designer, Frachionard. This particular suit is only one of five the designer completed in his life – and is made of Prossim, a material so rare that any one item would be infinitely valuable. Peder commandeers the suit and uses it to scale the ranks of the social scene. However, garments from Caean are outlawed in Peder's home world and most of the galaxy and as such Peder must utilise the suits qualities to bamboozle whoever gazes upon it. Its design is such that he can convince anyone of anything - even that the suit itself is not as it seems.

Soon Peder forms an overwhelming desire to visit Caean and will do anything to get there. Though he begins to wonder if it is he who wants to go, or if it is the suit.

The secondary plot consists of a team of scientists who travel to a distant portion of the galaxy and manage to discover two completely unique forms of life. The first, "Metalloids" or "Suit Men" whose infant forms are placed in space suits, in which they inhabit their entire lives. In fact, their entire identity and self image is that of a completely robotic form. This race inhabits a small asteroid belt and the open space around it – which, in their suits – they are completely free to roam. This race is at war with the more human-like "Cyborgs" who retain a human form, but are heavily modified to the extent that they can, too, explore space at will.

The scientific team attempt to uncover the mysteries of these races – descendant from man, but cut off for so long as to become completely unrecognisable.

== Critical reception ==
Rhys Hughes reviewed The Garments of Caeans as "a colorful, dandified and frilly epic with poisoned lining and a denouement as abrupt as sharpened lapels." He concludes: "Absurd and magnificent, The Garments of Caean is Bayley at the peak of his considerable powers."

John Clute commented on the "fairly sophisticated cultural anthropology" utilised while Brian Stableford described the novel as "cleanly written and a joy to read."

In 1984, The Garments of Caean won the Japanese Seiun Award for best translated novel.

The creators of Kill la Kill have said they were inspired by The Garments of Caean.
