= Being a Green Mother =

Novel by Piers Anthony

- Author: Piers Anthony
- Cover artist: Michael Whelan
- Series: Incarnations of Immortality
- Genre: Fantasy
- Publisher: Del Rey Books
- Publication date: 1987-12-01
- Pages: 313
- ISBN: 9780345322227
- OCLC: 16224483
- Preceded by: Wielding a Red Sword
- Followed by: For Love of Evil

Being a Green Mother is a fantasy novel by Piers Anthony. It is the fifth of eight books in the Incarnations of Immortality series. In it, Orb becomes the incarnation of Nature, in an attempt to thwart the plans of Satan.

== Setting and synopsis ==
Being a Green Mother centers on Orb Kaftan, a musician with magical abilities that manifests whenever she sings or plays music. Orb is searching for a mystical piece of music called the "Llano", which is considered "the most potent magic known". She meets Natasha, another musician on a quest for the Llano; after falling in love and marrying Natasha, he reveals himself to actually be Satan in disguise. Orb becomes Gaea, the incarnation of Nature, but loses control of her powers, destroying the world in the process. Another incarnation, Chronos, agrees to reverse time and undo the destruction, and Orb is forced to marry Satan. The book concludes with Satan destroying himself, losing his struggle with God as depicted across the other books in the series.

== Reception ==
Author David Langford reviewed Being a Green Mother for White Dwarf, criticizing both the characters and the plotting. Critic Andy Sawyer states that while the book explores difficult concepts, it also comes across as "an exercise in allegory by a writer whose prolific inventiveness overweighs any actual logic in his stories". The book was also cited as a "nice capstone to tie together the rest of the series into a satisfying conclusion". Similarly, writing for the Asbury Park Press, critic Drew Bittner states that "Being a Green Mother is definitely a strong conclusion to the [series]".

== Reviews ==
- Review by S. E. in Booklist, October 1987
- Review by J. Cassada in Library Journal, December 1987
- Review by Don D’Ammassa in Science Fiction Chronicle, February 1988
- Review by C. Caywood in Voice of Youth Advocates, June 1988
- Review by Andy Sawyer in Paperback Inferno, October/November 1988
