= The Astounding Jason Hyde =

British comic book story

- The title image used for all of The Astounding Jason Hyde stories in Valiant, art by Eric Bradbury.
- First appearance: Valiant 20 July 1964 (15 May 1965)

Publication information
- Publisher: Fleetway Publications; Rebellion Developments
- Schedule: Weekly
- Formats: Text story
- Publication date: 15 May 1965 – 11 May 1968

Creative team
- Writer(s): Barrington J. Bayley
- Artist(s): Eric Bradbury

Reprints
- Collected editions
- The Astounding Jason Hyde: ISBN 9781786186386

"The Astounding Jason Hyde" is a British comic story published in the weekly anthology Valiant from 15 May 1965 to 11 May 1968, published by Fleetway Publications. Uniquely for a story in Valiant, it consisted of illustrated prose episodes rather than comic strips. It tells the adventures of Jason Hyde, a scientist left with x-ray eyes and telepathy after exposure to radiation who subsequently embarks on a crimefighting career.

== Creation ==
The story was written by Barrington J. Bayley, who made published several short science fiction stories, first being published in 1954. He later met Michael Moorcock and the pair collaborated on various works for Fleetway Publications, including episodes of "Olac the Gladiator" for Tiger and factual articles for Look and Learn. However, Bayley disliked writing comic scripts and preferred prose at a time when text stories were beginning to go out of fashion in British. He would get his most sustained chance when he was assigned to create a text story for the otherwise all-picture Valiant in 1965, called "The Astounding Jason Hyde".

== Publishing history ==
"The Astounding Jason Hyde" ran in three page episodes in Valiant from 15 May 1965 to 11 May 1968; each featured the same opening half-page illustration by Eric Bradbury, with a new smaller pieces on the other two pages. In correspondence with Moorcock, Barrington would later recall the series positively, despite some tight deadlines. An 8-page self-contained story was also written for the 1968 edition of the Valiant Annual. He would also write another fantasy text serial, "Bartok and His Brothers", for Valiant's short-lived "companion paper" The Champion in 1966.

Following the end of the serial Jason Hyde was rarely seen, though he made a small cameo in the second issue WildStorm mini-series Albion in 2005. In 2018 the rights to the character were among a large number of pre-1970 Amalgamated Press/Fleetway Publications/IPC Magazines properties purchased by British publisher Rebellion Developments. As such, Hyde was among the classic characters featured in the new Smash! 2020 Special issued by Rebellion, featuring as a guest star in a strip starring fellow occult investigator Cursitor Doom, written by Maura McHugh with art by Andreas Butzbach. In 2022, Rebellion announced a collected edition of the series as part of their Treasury of British Comics series, with a cover by 2000 AD artist Jimmy Broxton. The pages themselves were reformatted for the collection.

== Plot summary ==
Scientist Jason Hyde travelled to the Himalayas while researching a rare species of bear, and fallen down a chasm where he was exposed to a natural form of radiation. While he survived, the accident left Hyde with plain white eyes that emitted a pale blue light that allowed him to see through objects and read minds. This left him ostracised from society; wearing special dark glasses to hide his eyes Hyde instead decided to set himself up as an investigator of the extraordinary. In addition to the abilities conferred by his eyes, Hyde equipped himself with a walking cane that contained numerous gadgets (including gas canisters) and used a personalised Super Sabre jet for transport.

Hyde's investigations brought him face to face with a race of giant mind-controlling spiders; rebels who deposed King Elxis of the forgotten underground kingdom of Infernis; the aliens of Sigma when the lost planet appeared in Earth's orbit; villain Zale Hermann and his arsenal of weaponry from a lost ancient Egyptian civilisation; evil scientist Rupert Grid, who had travelled to the future and returned with advanced scientific knowledge; an army raised by Karn, equipped with powerful rolling machines; mad scientist Doctor Ice and his army of ice-men in Antarctica; warring feline humanoids on the planet Triune; The Brain's science citadel below London; animals accidentally enlarged to giant size by Professor Sheldon; hypnotist Nestor Makento and his evil master Bram Harkam; cunning alien scientist Captain Bellum; nefarious electrical genius Doctor Rafe Klystron; and conquest-crazed Sir Jules Ravenge.

== Collected edition ==
Title	ISBN	Publisher	Release date	Contents
The Astounding Jason Hyde	9781786186386	Rebellion Developments	1 September 2022	Material from Valiant 15 May to 18 December 1965 and Valiant Annual 1968.

== Reception ==
Previewing the collected edition for Comicon.com, Richard Bruton praised Bayley's writing for its "boy’s-own adventure style" and Bradury's atmospheric artwork. Future 2000 AD editor Steve MacManus fondly remembered the story.
