= Collision Course (Bayley novel) =

1972 novel by Barrington J. Bayley

- First edition
- Author: Barrington J. Bayley
- Cover artist: Chris Foss
- Language: English
- Genre: Science fiction
- Publisher: DAW Books
- Publication date: February 1973
- Publication place: United Kingdom
- Media type: Print (Hardcover, Paperback)
- Pages: 175
- ISBN: 978-0-87997-043-7
- OCLC: 670871

Collision Course (a.k.a. Collision with Chronos) is the fourth novel by the science fiction author Barrington J. Bayley. The novel was inspired by the multiple time dimensions proposed by J. W. Dunne. The plot centers on the collision of two alternate "presents", with disastrous implications for reality.

== Literary significance and reception ==
Rhys Hughes, in his review of Bayley's work, ranked the novel as Bayley's third-best but still the most original time paradox story in modern SF, noting that, for the first time, Bayley's novels had reached the high standards of his short stories.

John Clute described Collision Course, along with Empire of Two Worlds and Annihilation Factor, as "variously successful" but held that The Fall of Chronopolis was Bayley's most fully realised time travel story.

Reviewing the novel in Vector, Brian Stableford criticised Bayley's tendency to arbitrarily switch between viewpoints but concluded that "[y]ou will find it a rewarding experience."

In 1990, Collision Course won the Japanese Seiun Award for best translated novel.

It was translated to Polish in 1983 and reviewed by Maciej Parowski in "Fantastyka" (5/83, p. 50).
