= The Fall of Chronopolis =

1974 novel by Barrington J. Bayley

- First edition
- Author: Barrington J. Bayley
- Cover artist: Kelly Freas
- Language: English
- Genre: Science fiction
- Publisher: DAW Books
- Publication date: June 1974
- Publication place: United Kingdom
- Media type: Print (Hardcover, Paperback)
- Pages: 175
- ISBN: 978-0-87997-043-7
- OCLC: 670871

The Fall of Chronopolis (ISBN 0-87997-043-X) is the fifth novel by the science fiction author Barrington J. Bayley. It details the eternal conflict through time between the Chronostatic Empire and its enemy, the Hegemony.

== Literary significance and reception ==
Rhys Hughes, in his survey of Bayley's output, described the novel as "possibly the ultimate time-travel story," noting that, unlike Collision Course, Bayley stuck to his main theme throughout.

John Clute, in the SF Encyclopedia, reviewed The Fall of Chronopolis as Bayley's most successful use of the theme of time travel.

David Pringle's review described the book as "enjoyable" and made note of the philosophy behind Bayley's intricate time paradox.
