= The Soul of the Robot =

1974 novel by Barrington J. Bayley

- First edition
- Author: Barrington J. Bayley
- Cover artist: Laszlo Kubinyi
- Language: English
- Genre: Science fiction
- Publisher: Doubleday
- Publication date: July 1974
- Publication place: United States
- Media type: Print (hardcover)
- Pages: 206
- ISBN: 0-385-01772-3
- Followed by: The Rod of Light

The Soul of the Robot is the sixth science fiction novel by Barrington J. Bayley, featuring the character Jasperodus from his 1956 story "Fugitive". The book tells of Jasperodus, the only robot with a soul, as he attempts to prove that he is the equal of the humans around him. It was published in 1974 by Doubleday, with a revised version published in 1976 by Allison and Busby.

== Literary significance and reception ==
Rhys Hughes and John Clute both felt that this was one of Bayley's lighter yet slighter works, arguing that the themes of the novel were better handled in John Sladek's Roderick.

Brian Stableford's review compared Bayley's absurd stylings with that of Alfred Jarry, concluding that the book was "thoroughly likeable."

Alastair Reynolds remembered the "massive enjoyment" he had reading the book and mentioned that Jasperodus had formed part of the inspiration for the character of Hesperus in House of Suns.
