= The Sinners of Erspia =

2002 novel by Barrington J. Bayley

- Author: Barrington J. Bayley
- Cover artist: Hieronymus Bosch, detail from The Garden of Earthly Delights
- Language: English
- Genre: Science fiction
- Publisher: Wildside Press
- Publication date: 2002 (Print on demand), April 2005
- Publication place: United States
- Media type: Print (Hardcover and Paperback)
- Pages: 180
- ISBN: 1-59224-102-6

The Sinners of Erspia is the fifteenth science fiction novel by Barrington J. Bayley. The main character is the interstellar courier Laedo, who is stranded on the bizarre artificial planetoid Erspia (an anagram of "aspire"). The novel focuses on his attempts to gain an understanding of Erspia and Erspia's creator, the god-like Klystar. The novel was completed in 1997 and was first published as a print-on-demand book in 2002.

== Literary significance and reception ==
Paul Di Filippo, reviewing the novel for Asimov's, described Bayley as "one of those shamefully overlooked sui generis writers that SF produces in abundance," concluding that The Sinners of Erspia was a "continually self-regenerating book."
