= With a Tangled Skein =

Novel by Piers Anthony

- First edition
- Author: Piers Anthony
- Cover artist: Michael Whelan
- Series: Incarnations of Immortality
- Publisher: Del Rey Books
- Publication date: 1985-09-12
- Media type: Print (hardcover)
- Pages: 280
- ISBN: 978-0-345-31884-8
- OCLC: 11915079
- Dewey Decimal: 813/.54 19
- LC Class: PS3551.N73 W5 1985
- Preceded by: Bearing an Hourglass
- Followed by: Wielding a Red Sword

With a Tangled Skein is a fantasy novel by Piers Anthony. It is the third of eight books in the Incarnations of Immortality series. In it, Niobe agrees to become one of the three aspects of the incarnation of Fate, in an attempt to thwart the plans of Satan.

== Plot ==
At around the time of World War I, a 21-year-old Irish woman named Niobe has a marriage arranged by her parents. Her husband-to-be is a 16-year-old boy named Cedric Kaftan. She considers him too immature, but can find no way out of the marriage. Although Niobe at first hates being married to Cedric, his good nature, kindheartedness, and desire to make her happy and keep her safe wins her over, and she falls in love with him. Cedric shows himself to be an intellectual prodigy. With some prodding and nurturing from his wife, Cedric accepts a scholarship to attend college and hone his magical abilities. He matures and finds his niche in magic and wetland studies, and he and Niobe have a child, Cedric Jr. A few years later, Cedric is assassinated by agents of Satan as part of a plot. Niobe petitions the Incarnations of Immortality to Cedric, only to be told that he died because she was the original target and Cedric died in her place. Niobe's anger at her husband's life being cut short makes her vow to make Satan pay.

She is invited to take the place of one of three women sharing a physical body as different aspects of the Incarnation of Fate. Eager to thwart Satan's plans and avenge Cedric, she leaves her child with Cedric's cousin and becomes Clotho, the youngest aspect of the Fates. The Fates weave the tapestry of life and have discretion over the length of human lives and the pattern they produce. Clotho, the youngest, spins the threads from the substance of Void to create souls, Lachesis, the middle aspect, measures the threads, and Atropos, the oldest, cuts the thread of each individual human. When she becomes Clotho, Niobe must journey to the edge of the Void without aid from the other Fates and replenish her stock of thread-material.

Because incarnations do not age, Niobe spends many years as Clotho. She frequently visits her son, Cedric Jr., who has befriended Cedric's younger cousin, Pacian. Because her lack of ageing would be noticed, she takes the form of the grandmotherly Atropos, pretending to be a concerned family friend. One day the Fates take the two boys to a fortune teller, who gives them disturbing news. Each of the boys are to marry the most beautiful women of their generation. Each marriage will produce a daughter who will oppose a tangle in the threads of life. One of the girls will marry Death, and the other is fated to marry Evil.

Pacian's daughter eventually weds Cedric Jr. but Pacian's wife dies at the wedding. Niobe realizes she is destined to marry Pacian and despite them both resisting, fall in love and wed after she leaves the office of Clotho. She gives birth to a daughter they name Orb. At around the same time, Cedric Jr., now a powerful magician, has a daughter named Luna. The girls grow up together under the magician's protection. One day, the girls and Niobe leave on a quest for powerful artifacts that will enhance their natural talents. Satan uses the opportunity to send demons against them; although he knows one of the girls is fated to marry him, he is not interested in a wife who is not evil. Niobe keeps the girls safe, and Satan's plot comes to nothing.

A year after the events of On a Pale Horse, the now middle-aged Niobe is again asked to join the Incarnation of Fate, this time as Lachesis. Satan has arranged that all three offices become vacant at the same time, making the Incarnation of Fate inexperienced in all three aspects simultaneously. The current officeholders hope to use Niobe's previous experience as an ace in the hole to thwart Satan's latest plot.

They learn that Satan plans to cause political turmoil in the UN by having one of his minions plant a stink bomb. They are forced to spend time investigating likely minions one by one, while in the meantime Satan offers ageing political candidates a chance at renewed youth and the chance to start over in their careers, in exchange for their resignation from office. He plans to replace them with his own minions who would work against Luna. Realizing that their inexperience is a liability, the Fates seek help. They learn that Niobe's magician son can help them. Unfortunately he is now in Hell. Satan cannot prevent them from searching for him, but he can make the quest very unpleasant and one of them must risk her own soul in the process. Niobe is worried that Satan will cheat, so she arranges for the Incarnation of War to supervise the contest.

Niobe leaves the Fates' collective body and goes to Hell. She must beat Satan's challenge—a puzzle-maze—to get the answers she needs. Eventually, she finds her son, but Satan has cast an illusion over him. She solves the puzzle anyway—and learns that Satan's plot can be stopped by Atropos. Satan's minions falsely believe their service will get them better treatment in hell. If Fate were to tell them truth and that Atropos will cut their lives short, they would no longer serve him. By issuing this threat, Niobe wins the game and is allowed to leave Hell freely.

== Reception ==
In a review for the Library Journal, Jackie Cassada says that With a Tangled Skein is "full of logic puzzles and mazes to unravel, this latest novel by the prolific Anthony will please his many fans."

Dave Langford reviewed With a Tangled Skein for White Dwarf #82, and stated that "Anthony's fluency never flags, but Skein suffers from dull passages rehashing earlier books, and falls apart entirely at the end."
