= The Great Hydration =

2002 novel by Barrington J. Bayley

- Author: Barrington J. Bayley
- Language: English
- Genre: Science fiction
- Publisher: Wildside Press
- Publication date: 2002 (Print on demand), April 2005
- Publication place: United States
- Media type: Print (Hardcover and Paperback)
- Pages: 132
- ISBN: 1-59224-103-4

The Great Hydration is a science fiction novel by English writer Barrington J. Bayley. The book, his last one, was written in 1998 and first published as a print on demand edition in 2002. The book features the illegal traders Krabbe and Bouche, the first humans to reach the planet of Tenacity, as they proceed to destroy the planet's anhydrous economy in an attempt to make a quick profit.

== Literary significance and reception ==
In Paul Di Filippo's book review column in Asimov's, he described Bayley as "a combination of Robert Sheckley, David Bunch and Stanislaw Lem." Di Filippo reviewed The Great Hydration as confirming "Bayley’s witty, wonderland plotting."
