= Wielding a Red Sword =

1986 fantasy novel by Piers Anthony

- First edition
- Author: Piers Anthony
- Cover artist: Michael Whelan
- Series: Incarnations of Immortality
- Genre: Fantasy
- Publisher: Del Rey Books
- Publication date: 1986-09-12
- Media type: Print (hardcover)
- ISBN: 978-0-345-32220-3
- OCLC: 13395102
- Dewey Decimal: 813/.54 19
- LC Class: PS3551.N73 W48 1986
- Preceded by: With a Tangled Skein
- Followed by: Being a Green Mother

Wielding a Red Sword is a fantasy novel by Piers Anthony. It is the fourth of eight books in the Incarnations of Immortality series.

== Plot summary ==
Mym, an Indian prince, defies his father's plans for an arranged marriage, instead joining a travelling circus. He meets Orb, who teaches him to manage a stutter through song. He is soon discovered, and his father arranges for him to marry a princess by the name of Rapture of Malachite. After fighting against this for days on end, he finally realises that Rapture is worth loving, and so concedes to the marriage. However, a plot to separate him from her results in his decision to become the Incarnation of War.

Through the course of living as Mars, Rapture takes up a life of her own and decides that she does not need him any more. Satan arranges, subtly, a demoness for his new companion, hoping to get Mars in his debt that way. In the end, this backfires and he ends up with two loves in his life.

His ultimate goal was to use his position to ameliorate some of the suffering being caused by war on Earth, and is surprised by Satan's encouragement. Soon he realises the subtle importances of human war and conflict: under certain circumstances, human suffering is increased, not decreased, by abstinence from armed response. Satan's plan is to have an inexperienced office-holder in the position of the Incarnation of War, such that he can manipulate the course of armed conflicts on Earth, allowing some wars through and blocking the progression of others, such that the overall balance of evil in the world is increased.

He accomplished the replacement of the previous Mars by facilitating the cessation of all conflict in the world—not only war, but bar brawls and even minor squabbles between children counts as conflict—every time this happens in history, the Incarnation of War retires and passes on into the afterlife. Mym stepped into the office at a time when global violence was just being recommenced, and thus became an opportunity for Satan to manipulate a naïve Mars.

Part of this process was a plot by which Satan managed to trap Mym in Hell. Mym eventually led a revolution of the lost souls and secured an escape route, employing lessons from Miyamoto Musashi's famous treatise, The Book of Five Rings, to defeat Satan in a one-on-one battle. However, during his absence, Satan has manipulated the geopolitical situation such that international tensions everywhere are at an all-time high, and the world is on the brink of apocalypse.

This results in virtually every government everywhere adopting martial law, as normal democratic process is eminently non-viable. A result of this, and an important objective for Satan, is that Luna Kaftan has become sidelined, unable to fulfill the prophecy that she would rise into political office and stand as a bulwark against Satan.

Mym realises Satan's underlying objective, and forces a confrontation on terms unfavourable to Satan—he travels to the Doomsday Clock, a signifier of how close the world is at any given time to Armageddon, and there employs the powers specific to his office to escalate world violence and bring War to ultimate fruition—Judgement Day.

The crux is this: that Satan is not yet ready for the Final Judgment to happen, as the current balance of souls on Earth is favourable to God—i.e. God would get a greater proportion of the souls, signifying (in this fictional universe) the ultimate victory of Good. At the very last minute, Satan is forced to concede and withdraw. Mym lowers his Sword and returns the world to a state of relative peace.

Mym learns that his responsibility as War is not to promote war and violence, but to make sure that conflicts are handled fairly.

== War's accoutrements ==
=== The Red Sword ===
Much like Chronos, War has one major artifact, the Red Sword of his office. It allows him to travel, freeze local time, and represents his office much like Time's Hourglass, in that it cannot be lost or put aside. Like Death's Scythe, it is a magical weapon capable of cutting through any substance. Its true power, however, is to amplify conflict, and make people naturally inclined to follow War, facilitating his ability to stir up battle wherever he so chooses.

=== The Four Horsemen ===
War is one of the few incarnations with a retinue. He is accompanied by four horsemen (in addition to having his own horse, Werre): Conquest, Slaughter, Famine, and Pestilence. They are minor Incarnations, not nearly as powerful as the seven major players. It is not made clear whether they are also mortals serving an office or something else entirely. They are usually supplied with some general idea of what is going to happen and whether it is important, but it is nearly always incomplete – most of the work remains up to War himself.

=== The Doomsday Clock ===
The Doomsday Clock is a massive clock that can be controlled only by War, counting down the time until midnight – a figurative representation of the Apocalypse. The higher the world's tensions, the closer it will show. War has the power, however, to intensify these tensions and force the Apocalypse, the final battle that will wipe out humanity. However, this power is mostly contained in the Red Sword, with the Doomsday Clock only representative of the current situation, rather than actually causing it.

== Method of transfer ==
War's method of transfer is unique in several ways. For one, he is the only Incarnation that takes breaks between officeholders – there are short periods where he is simply not needed. And secondly, the Red Sword in fact chooses the new candidate, rather than the previous officeholder. War is forcibly retired the instant that there is no war left on Earth, anywhere. With worldwide peace, his office is no longer necessary, and he is sent on to Heaven or Hell. As soon as a new war begins, however, the Red Sword activates once more and seeks out an appropriate officeholder. It looks for those with warrior training, proficient in strategy and weapon use, who is both a member of one of the sides in the newly declared war, and who desires the position – measured by rage and bloodlust at the time of the war.

== Reception ==
Dave Langford reviewed Wielding a Red Sword for White Dwarf #93, and stated that "What dissatisfies is the introduction of tantalizing conflicts which aren't developed. How can a devout Hindu begin to accept Anthony's massively Christian heaven and hell? No credible answer emerges."

== Reviews ==
- Review by Michael M. Levy (1986) in Fantasy Review, December 1986
- Review by Andy Sawyer (1987) in Paperback Inferno, #68
- Review by Phyllis McDonald (1987) in Interzone, #22 Winter 1987
- Review by Don D'Ammassa (1988) in Science Fiction Chronicle, #101 February 1988
