= And Eternity =

1990 novel by Piers Anthony

- First edition
- Author: Piers Anthony
- Series: Incarnations of Immortality
- Genre: Fantasy
- Publisher: William Morrow & Co
- Publication date: January 1990
- Media type: Hardcover
- Pages: 369
- ISBN: 978-0-688-08688-6
- OCLC: 19555148
- Dewey Decimal: 813/.54 20
- LC Class: PS3551.N73 A8 1990
- Preceded by: For Love of Evil
- Followed by: Under a Velvet Cloak

And Eternity is a fantasy novel by Piers Anthony. It is the seventh of eight books in the Incarnations of Immortality series.

== Plot summary ==
In the seventh novel of the series, three women—the ghost of Jolie, the ghost of Orlene (daughter of Orb), and a fifteen-year-old drug-addicted prostitute named Vita—try to discover a way to restore the life of Orlene's baby, Gawain II, who had died as a result of a severe birth defect inflicted unknowingly by Gaea at the request of the child's ghost father Gawain. Nox, the mysterious Incarnation of Night, promises to help, but she needs a specific item of great value from each of the other Incarnations in order to resurrect the baby. The three women set out to meet with each of the other seven Incarnations of Day.

In the process of obtaining the items, they conclude that the definitions of Good and Evil used to classify souls as destined for Heaven and Hell are flawed. Orlene's soul had been denied access to Heaven because she committed suicide in a futile attempt to help her baby. Vita meets and comes under the protection of an older male judge; they fall in love and have sex, but this too is considered Evil, because Vita is below the legal age of consent. The three women eventually succeed in gaining the item from each one of the Incarnations, with the exception of God, the Incarnation of Good, who has become obsessed with his own greatness and is completely unresponsive to the outside world.

Reporting their discovery to the other Incarnations, they all conclude that God has been derelict in his duty and must be replaced so that the eventual triumph of Evil can be prevented. Luna Kaftan, now an influential Senator, begins a campaign to impeach God and declare the office of the Incarnation of Good vacant. Thus, the final conflict between Good and Evil becomes a political one, fought with words and votes in the halls of a legislature, and not by armies on a battlefield.

Despite Satan's efforts, Luna's campaign succeeds, and a mortal must now be chosen to become the new Incarnation of Good. However, the replacement must be selected by a unanimous vote of all the other Incarnations, including Satan himself—and why would the Incarnation of Evil approve a candidate who would effectively promote the cause of Good? Each Incarnation, in turn, nominates a mortal for the position. (Gaea's nominee happens to be the same judge that became Vita's lover.)

After all the other Incarnations make their suggestions, to their complete amazement, Satan nominates Orlene, whose soul had become exactly half evil as a result of choices none of the other Incarnations were willing to condemn. The other Incarnations immediately agree that Satan has made the best possible choice, and they unanimously declare Orlene to be the new Incarnation of Good.

Therefore, the girls find that Nox had set up the items from the other Incarnations to help Orlene take the place of God and in doing so, become God herself. In return, Orlene allows Nox to keep Gawain II as she will no longer be able to care for him and the child is content with the Incarnation of Night.

== Good's Dominion ==
As Orlene does not ascend to be the Incarnation of Good until the very end of the novel, almost nothing is revealed about how God operates, what specific powers are available, or what the actual job entails. Nor is the method of transference revealed, as the position is involuntarily taken away from the previous God. However, it is likely that God carries on much the same duties as Satan, merely in the sake of finding Good, rather than Evil.

== Literary significance and reception ==
Jackie Cassada in the Library Journal review says that "This grand finale to one of the author's most popular series showcases Anthony's multiple strengths: high humor, appealing characters, serious themes, and a surprising - although, in hindsight, inevitable conclusion. "
