= The Phantom Viking =

British comic book character

- The Phantom Viking in Lion, 14 October 1967. Art by Nevio Zeccara.

Character information
- First appearance: The Champion (26 February 1966)

In-story information
- Alter ego: Olaf Larsen
- Species: Human/Norse god
- Place of origin: Earth
- Partnerships: Helen Yates
- Abilities: Flight; Superhuman strength Increased durability

Publication information
- Publisher: Fleetway Publications
- Schedule: Weekly
- Title(s): The Champion; 26 February to 4 June 1966; Lion; 11 June 1966 to 3 August 1968; The Champion Annual; 1967 to 1968; Lion Annual; 1968 to 1970
- Formats: Original material for the series has been published as a strip in the comics anthology(s) The Champion; Lion.
- Genre: Superhero
- Publication date: 26 February 1966 – 3 August 1968

Creative team
- Writer(s): Donne Avenell
- Artist(s): José Ortiz; Nevio Zeccara

The Phantom Viking is a British comic character, appearing in strips published by Fleetway Publications. The character's alter-ego was weak-willed school teacher Olaf Larsen, who gained the ability to turn into the Phantom Viking when he dons a Norse helmet. The character first appeared in the debut issue of the short-lived boys' anthology title The Champion on 26 February 1966, and continued in Lion when it was merged with Champion a short while later.

== Creation ==
The Champion (a rare case of Fleetway publications reusing the name of a cancelled publication, in this case that of a long-running story paper) was devised as a 'companion paper' to the successful Valiant; a similar tactic had been used two years previously with Hurricane, which had run for only 63 issues before merging with Tiger. The Champion was partly devised to test the waters for British reader response to modified material from continental titles such as Tintin and Spirou, something which would potentially provide a large well of material at a low price. However, group editor Jack Le Grand still wanted some in-house material included as a fall-back, and Donne Avenell - an experienced writer who had been with Fleetway's predecessor Amalgamated Press since before World War II, having been an early contributor to Radio Fun - came up with the Phantom Viking. Initially the strip was drawn by the Spanish artist José Ortiz, who was becoming a key contributor for Fleetway and other publishers, notably the newspaper strip Caroline Baker, Barrister at Law in the Daily Express. It has been suggested that the character was inspired by the surge in interest of superheroes in American comics in general, and Marvel Comics' Thor in particular.

== Publishing history ==
The Champion was even less successful than Hurricane, only lasting 15 issues - the shortest run of any of the company's weeklies up to that point - before being merged into the established Lion, with Nevio Zeccara taking over on art duties shortly afterwards. The strip would run in the renamed Lion and Champion until 3 August 1968. Due to Fleetway's policy of continuing to issue annuals for cancelled titles (in order to have as many books as possible on shelves for the lucrative Christmas market), parallel to the Lion run further adventures (both in picture strip and text stories) appeared in the two Champion Annuals issued, and then transferred to the Lion Annual until the 1970 edition, despite having finished in the weekly. The character would then make one final outing in the 1973 Jet Annual.

Since 2018 the rights to the Fleetway-originated contents of The Champion and Lion, including the Phantom Viking, have been owned by Rebellion Developments.

== Plot summary ==
Meek Woodburn School teacher Olaf Larsen is tormented by his charges (who call him Loopy Larsen behind his back) and berated by headmaster Mr. Grimsole for his inability to keep order, with only school secretary Helen Yates having any sympathy for him. Moping at an old Viking burial ground, he finds a helmet bearing the inscription "Only Larsen the Liberator and his descendants shall have the power of the helmet... the secret of great strength and flight" - though the powers disappear when the wind blows from the south. Placing it on his head he finds himself transformed into a powerful, long-haired flying Viking. After dealing with some minor criminals and saving an experimental jet from crashing, he soon acquires the name the Phantom Viking but Larsen opts to keep his true identity a secret. As the Phantom Viking, he saved his recalcitrant pupils from a flood and from getting mixed up in a kidnap plot on a skiing trip to Switzerland, while also battling racketeers and greedy officials. His frequent need to slip away to become the Phantom Viking began to affect Larsen's job performance and he considering giving up his double-life, especially as he becomes closer to Helen. However after the pair find themselves in the middle of a ship hijacking; Larsen dons the helmet again and ultimately decides to continue.

The Phantom Viking thwarted diamond thieves, halted a crooked major's attempts to use mind-controlled Commandos as bank robbers, a gang of arsonists, helped friend Pete Brown recover a fleet of sunken Spanish galleons, saved his pupils from kidnapping triplet evil scientists the Grinn Brothers, stopped James Ford from using a gang of pint-sized criminals from robbing the Exum diamond factory in Amsterdam, foiled a network of saboteurs, stopped the mysterious Mr. X from stealing plutonium with an army of stone men, and a battling a huge invading cyborg space-creature. After the Phantom Viking was unable to defeat the latter, Larsen reasoned with the mechanoid himself, using his logic to persuade the alien to withdraw, finally impressing everyone in his mortal guise.
