= The Zen Gun =

1983 novel by Barrington J. Bayley

- First edition
- Author: Barrington J. Bayley
- Cover artist: Frank Kelly Freas
- Language: English
- Genre: Science fiction
- Publisher: DAW Books
- Publication date: August 1983
- Publication place: United States
- Media type: Print (Paperback)
- Pages: 159
- ISBN: 0-87997-851-1

The Zen Gun is the eleventh science fiction novel by Barrington J. Bayley.

== Background ==
Like many of Bayley's books, The Zen Gun is space opera with all the conventional trappings: a declining, anthropocentric, Galactic empire loses its grasp on power as it slips into the Long Night of civilization, star fleets with the ability to ravage worlds warp through the void at superluminal velocity and a hyperweapon threatens to end life itself. However, Bayley extensively reworks these ideas for the purposes of his novel: the humans of the galactic empire are seen to have ceded most of their imperial power to evolved animals in an attempt to prolong their decadent existence, Admiral Archier's starfleet has been despatched to collect overdue taxes from colony worlds, the empire have ripped a hole in the fabric of reality and the pseudoscientific belief that gravity is repulsive rather than attractive is literally true.

The events of the primary plotline are instigated by a message from Archier's Oracle, which alerts him to the existence of the Zen Gun, a weapon capable of destroying suns, which the chimeric, human-hating Pout wishes to use to annihilate the empire. Powerful as the weapon is, its existence is a paradox, as only those who have attained inner peace can use it. In his attempts, Pout is aided by kosho Ikkematsu (one of an order of futuristic Samurai), Ikkematsu's nephew Sinbiane and the rebel Hesper.

== Literary significance and reception ==
Rhys Hughes regarded The Zen Gun as Bayley's most entertaining late-period novel, where "[s]o many ideas are played off against each other that there is hardly any room for the reader to breathe."

Bruce Sterling enthused extensively about the novel in the legendary fanzine Cheap Truth: "Yet Bayley's elemental energy, his mastery of the sense of wonder, cannot be denied. His work is the very antithesis of tired hackdom. To invent an entire self-consistent cosmology and physics for a $2.50 DAW paperback (THE ZEN GUN, 1983) is one of those noble acts of selfless altruism that keep SF alive." Earlier in the review, Sterling had labelled Bayley "the Zen master of modern space opera."

Dave Langford reviewed The Zen Gun for White Dwarf #49, and stated that "The deadpan humour blends with loony physics [...] the fabric of space coming apart, and the zen gun itself, which is the most powerful weapon ever, designed to make centralized empires impossible – and is pocket-sized, carved from wood."

Colin Greenland reviewed The Zen Gun for Imagine magazine, and stated that "Sounds like Douglas Adams territory, but it's not comedy. In fact Bayley has a whole new theory of physics to expound, and does so in meticulous detail. A shame, then, that you have to work to extract the good bits from some very clumsy writing generously seasoned with misprints."

Algis Budrys reviewed The Zen Gun favorably, "commending" Bayley for "as good a set of adventure characters, placed in the context of as good an adventure premise as I've seen in a very long time."

The Zen Gun was nominated for the Philip K. Dick Award in 1983, and won the Seiun Award for Best Foreign Language Novel of the Year in 1985.
