= The Champion (comics) =

British weekly boys' comic

- The cover to The Champion, dated 5 March 1966 and featuring Jet Jordan.

Publication information
- Publisher: IPC/Fleetway Publications, 1966
- Schedule: Weekly
- Format: Ongoing series
- Genre: Action/adventure
- Publication date: 26 February – 4 June 1966
- No. of issues: 15
- Editor(s): Gil Page

The Champion was a weekly British comics periodical published by Fleetway Publications from 26 February to 4 June 1966. The series revived the name of the story paper of the same name printed by Fleetway's predecessor, Amalgamated Press; however, while the first version of The Champion had run from 1922 to 1956, the new title lasted little more than three months before being merged with another Fleetway boys' comic, the established Lion.

== Creation ==
The original edition of The Champion had been merged with Tiger in 1955, and had been a more traditional 'story paper' largely focusing on illustrated text stories. In 1966, Fleetway announced the name would be re-used for a new "picture weekly", with a focus on comic strip stories. Gil Page was assigned as editor, with the rest of the team drawn from Fleetway's successful Valiant weekly. Both for this reason and to boost sales, the cover would proclaim "Champion is the companion paper to Valiant" - a tactic previously used on Hurricane (29 February 1964 to 13 March 1965).

An unusual feature compared to Fleetway's other boys' comics was the title's high quotient of material imported from continental Europe - including "Dan Cooper" (as "Jet Jordan"), "Michel Vaillant" ("The Knights of Konigsfeld") and "Modeste et Pompon" ("Jinks") from Tintin, and "Lucky Luke" ("Boy Kidd") and "Starter" ("Whacker") from Spirou. These were heavily edited, with dialogue freely translated, names changed, panels resized and rearranged and - with the exception of cover feature "Jet Jordan" - printed in black-and-white. The origin of this material, which had not been previously published in Britain, was not made clear to readers. Newly created material included Norse superhero "The Phantom Viking" (often considered to have been inspired by Marvel Comics' Thor) and futuristic war drama "Return of the Stormtroopers".

== Publication history ==
Previewed by a flyer sent out to newsagents, the first issue was published on Monday 28 January 1966 (Note: At the time, British industry standard was that comics featured their off-sale date, rather than the date of publication.) - as a new comic, it further tempted readers with a free cover-mounted gift in the form of a 'Jet Screamer Balloon' - a toy balloon with a graphic of a space explorer printed on it. The 40-page title was priced at 7d. The second would offer a plastic 'Cup Tie Whistle', while the third tempted potential readers with "The Champion Book of Football Stars", featuring Gordon Banks on its cover.

However, the series would only last for 15 editions before being merged into Lion. "The Phantom Viking", "Return of the Stormtroopers", "Jet Jordan", "Boy Kidd", "Lofty Lightyear" and "Whacker" would all be continued in the renamed Lion and Champion; however, most of these were short-lived and by the end of the year only "The Phantom Viking" was still a regular. The first Lion of 1968 would see The Champion dropped from front page billing. However - as with several cancelled titles - Fleetway continued to use The Champion name for hardbacked annuals, dated 1967 and 1968. (Note: Annuals of the time were issued in the autumn of the year before that listed on the cover, in time for the Christmas gift-buying market and dated to make it easier for unsold stock to be sold afterwards.) Despite not being intended as a science fiction anthology, The Champion was perceived as such and its failure reputedly put Fleetway off further such series until Star Wars' success led to the creation of 2000 AD in 1977.

In 2018 the rights to the original material for The Champion were among the pre-1970 AP/Fleetway/IPC library purchased by Rebellion Developments.

== Stories ==
=== The Astounding Adventures of Dr. X ===
Published: 5 March 1966 to 9 April 1966
Artist: Albert Weinberg

Doctor Xavier Kent, nicknamed 'Doctor X' by his friends, is abducted by aliens from the planet Pharos.

- Modified reprints of "Alain Landier" from Tintin.

=== Bartok and His Brothers ===
Published: 26 February 1966 to 4 June 1966
Writer: Barrington J. Bayley
Illustrator: Eric Bradbury

Scientist Bartok makes four duplicates of himself - one has strength, one speed, one courage, and one genius. Together the five "brothers" fight crime, though their various skills cause some changes to their personalities.

- Text story.

=== Battler Britton ===
Published: 7 May 1966 to 4 June 1966

The adventures of a World War II British fighter ace.

- Reprints of previous appearances from Sun.

=== Boy Kidd ===
Published: 26 February 1966 to 4 June 1966
Writer: René Goscinny
Artist: Morris

A town at the mercy of juvenile outlaw Boy Kidd is offered salvation by louche travelling gunslinger Buck Bingo.

- Modified reprints of "Lucky Luke" from Spirou; continued in Lion.

=== Cosmic Nick ===
Published: 26 February 1966 to 4 June 1966

Earth boy Anthony has to cope with the clumsy antics of his alien friend Nick from the planet Clotto.

- One-page humour cartoon.

=== The Fighting Fifteenth ===
Published: 2 April 1966 to 30 April 1966

A motley crew of RAF pilots are deployed as a makeshift squadron during the German invasion of Greece.

- A modified reprint of Air Ace Picture Library #22, originally called "Savage Sky".

=== Hunters Without Guns ===
Published: 26 February 1966 to 4 June 1966
Writer: Yves Duval
Artist: Édouard Aidans

Big game photographer Steve Hunter takes his family on assignment to Africa.

- Modified reprints of "Marc Franval" from Tintin.

=== Jet Jordan ===
Published: 26 February 1966 to 4 June 1966
Writer: Jean-Michel Charlier
Artist: Albert Weinberg

Canadian Air Force pilot Jet Jordan undertakes dangerous test missions.

- Modified reprints of "Dan Cooper" from Tintin; continued in Lion.

=== Jinks ===
Published: 26 February 1966 to 4 June 1966
Cartoonist: André Franquin

Jinks' wish to simply have some peace and quiet at home is constantly undermined by innumerable catastrophes, usually caused by one of his oddball acquaintances.

- Modified version of Modeste et Pompon from Tintin; continued in Lion.

=== The Knights of Konigsfeld ===
Published: 26 February 1966 to 4 June 1966
Writer and Artist: Jean Gratton

On their way to the German Grand Prix at the Nürburgring, racing driver brothers Micky and Roger Brand are among those invited to the mysterious Konigsfeld Castle by Herr Spangeberg and his odd daughter Gabrielle.

- Modified reprints of "Michel Vaillant" from Tintin.

=== Lofty Lightyear ===
Published: 26 February 1966 to 4 June 1966
Writer: Roy Davis
Artists: John Mortimer

Professor Von Nutkaze helps a freakishly tall alien stay out of the clutches of a persistent flying saucer.

- One-page comic strip; continued in Lion.

=== The Phantom Viking ===
Published: 26 February 1966 to 4 June 1966
Writer: Donne Avenell
Artist: José Ortiz

Nebbish teacher Olaf Larson finds a mystical helmet belonging to one of his Norse antecendants at a Viking burial site. Donning the headgear gave him the ability to turn into the mighty Phantom Viking - a popular hero, in contrast to the awkward teacher mocked as "Loopy Larson" by his Woodburn School pupils. The Phantom Viking's only weakness was that his powers would disappear when the a south wind blew. Despite his pronounced general air of weakness, Larsen attracted sympathy from beautiful secretary Helen Yates.

- Continued in Lion.

=== Return of the Stormtroopers ===
Published: 26 February 1966 to 4 June 1966
Artist: Eric Bradbury

A forgotten Nazi army led by General Von Stern awaken in 2046 after being cryogenically frozen in the last days of World War II. Finding an enlightened society which has long eschewed weapons, the unit swiftly conquers Britain but have to contend with a resistance led by plucky Bill Churchill.

- Continued in Lion.

=== School for Spacemen ===
Published: 26 February 1966 to 4 June 1966
Artists: Mike Western

Space cadets Booster Bannion and Pluto Pimm deal with the antics of class clown Malcolm Carmody.

=== The Space Travellers ===
Published: 16 April 1966 to 28 May 1966

Paul Wright, his teacher Arnold Campus and Fred Muggle accidentally land on planet Centaur.

=== Spider Webb ===
Published: 26 February 1966 to 4 June 1966
Artists: Douglas Maxted

Lanky youth "Spider" Webb tries for a career in boxing, helped by scrapyard-owning uncle Fred Flie.

=== War Eagle ===
Published: 26 February 1966 to 26 March 1966
Artists: Ferdinando Tacconi

After an eagle saves Squadron Leader "Brad" Bradley's Spitfire from destruction his squadron adopts it as a lucky mascot.

- Reprinted from Comet.

=== Whacker ===
Published: 26 February 1966 to 4 June 1966

Liverpudlians Whacker and Mac move to a tumbledown country house Hardnutt Hall. In the garage they find an old jalopy fitted with a computer brain that takes them on adventures.

- A Modified version of "Starter" from Spirou; continued in Lion.

=== When the Sky Turned Green ===
Published: 26 February 1966 to 28 May 1966
Artists: Carlos Cruz

The crew of submarine HMS Conqueror surface to find a strange green glow has immobilised everything above water, and set out to find who is behind it.

=== World of Champions ===
Published: 26 February 1966 to 28 May 1966

- A four page strip relaying the stories of several real life "champions" of various walks, including Ferdinand Magellan, Stirling Moss, Frank Whittle, Juan Manuel Fangio, George Patton IV, Percy Fawcett, Joe Louis, Ernest Swinton, Jacques Anquetil, Christopher Cockerell, Harry Houdini, Samuel Colt, Georges Carpentier, Malcolm and Donald Campbell, and the Harlem Globetrotters.
