= The Star Virus =

1970 novel by Barrington J. Bayley

- First edition
- Author: Barrington J. Bayley
- Cover artist: Kelly Freas
- Language: English
- Genre: Science fiction
- Publisher: Ace Books
- Publication date: 1970
- Publication place: United States
- Media type: Print (paperback)
- Pages: 120

The Star Virus (1970) is the first science fiction novel by Barrington J. Bayley, expanded from a 1964 short story originally published in New Worlds. The plot centers on the attempts of humanity, the star virus of the title, to break through a barrier around the galaxy.

== Literary significance and reception ==
Rhys Hughes said that the novel was "mildly exciting" but faulted its impatience, lack of satisfactory explanations and "its callow attempt at mutating the ethics of the disaster-epic". However, he also notes that the novel's downbeat tone did go on to influence writers such as M. John Harrison.

Similarly, John Clute recognised the influence of the "complex and somewhat gloomy" novel on British SF, though he adds that readers of conventional space opera may have been alienated by Bayley's style and tone.

William S. Burroughs used the concept of "deadliners" from the novel in his own Nova Express, quoting Bayley's story in its New Worlds appearance.
