= On a Pale Horse =

1983 fantasy novel by Piers Anthony

On A Pale Horse
- First edition
- Author: Piers Anthony
- Language: English
- Series: Incarnations of Immortality
- Genre: Fantasy, dark fantasy
- Publisher: Del Rey Books
- Publication date: 1983-10-12
- Publication place: United States
- Media type: Hardcover
- Pages: 325
- ISBN: 978-0-345-30924-2
- OCLC: 9393093
- Dewey Decimal: 813/.54 19
- LC Class: PS3551.N73 O5 1983
- Followed by: Bearing an Hourglass

On a Pale Horse is a fantasy novel by Piers Anthony, first published in 1983. It is the first of eight books in the Incarnations of Immortality series. The book focuses on Zane, a photographer about to commit suicide who instead kills Death and must assume his office. The book spawned a five-issue comic series, released by Innovation Publishing from 1991 to 1993, but Innovation went out of business before releasing the sixth and final issue. It was also the inspiration for the television series, Dead Like Me, which worked on the premise that there are multiple Grim Reapers working the planet.

== Plot summary ==
In the 1980s, Zane is living a pathetic life without money or employment. When a magic gem merchant cheats Zane out of an opportunity for romance, Zane decides to take his own life. As he starts to pull the trigger, he sees the spectre of Death (Thanatos) advancing on him. Startled, he pulls the gun from his own head and shoots Death right between the eyes. He is then visited by a woman who introduces herself as Fate, who insists that Zane must now assume the position of the man he has killed, since whoever kills Death must become the new Death. As Zane makes his way downstairs, he gets his first view of a pale limousine with the license plate reading "Mortis", his Death Steed (Death rides a pale horse) who can assume the form of a pale boat, a plane, or a pale limousine, as well as the form of a pale horse. Fate then departs and leaves Zane in the care of Chronos, the Incarnation of Time, who then instructs Zane how to use his deathwatch, how Mortis changes form, how to use other instruments of the office, and exactly what his new duties are. This entails residing in Purgatory and visiting Earth to collect the souls of humans who are in a close balance of good and evil and cannot determine their eternal destination (Heaven or Hell) without help.

In the course of learning the job, he discovers that his coming into the office of Death was not accidental, but was manipulated by a powerful magician (Cedric Kaftan Jr.). Despite being a mortal, this magician has strong ties to the other Incarnations from Purgatory and reveals to Zane that the Incarnation of Fate arranged Zane's destiny for the magician's purpose. There is a prophecy which states that Luna Kaftan, the magician's daughter, is destined to go into politics and thwart the schemes of Satan, the Incarnation of Evil. Luna Kaftan is thus a target for the forces of Hell and is in need of supernatural protection. The magician, who has done a great deal of research, feels that Zane is the best candidate for the Incarnation of Death to fall in love with Luna and thus want to protect her.

The only way for the magician Kaftan to meet with Death without Satan's knowledge is to die with his soul in balance. The magician chooses to sacrifice his own life to introduce Zane to Luna and explain to Zane the circumstances which brought him into the office of Death.

The dead magician's plans, however, seem to go awry. Due to manipulation by Satan, Luna is also destined to die before she can fulfill the prophecy. The magician had used too much black magic for his soul to be in balance. To bring it into balance before committing suicide, he has transferred the excess evil on his soul to Luna's soul, whom he has assumed to be innocent of evil. However, Luna has a burden of evil on her soul already, and her father's scheme has put her on the course to Hell. To correct this, she volunteers to switch places with one of Death's other clients. By sacrificing her own life to save another, she manages to balance the evil on her soul.

Her actions play right into Satan's trap, who does not care whether she goes to Heaven or Hell, only that she dies and is no longer a threat to his plots. However, Zane has already fallen in love with Luna by this time, just like the magician had planned, and he refuses to take the soul of the woman he loves.

Now the motives behind the magician's choice of Zane are made clear to him when the other four Incarnations (Time, Fate, War, and Nature) from Purgatory approach him and explain that they were all in on the plan. The previous Death could not be manipulated into betraying the duties of his office for love, so the Incarnations of Immortality decided to replace him with a young, stubborn man like Zane, who could.

Because Luna's soul is next in the queue, Zane cannot take the souls of other mortals until he deals with hers. He refuses to do so, thereby going on strike and leaving dying mortals in agony, unable to be released by death. As this is not to Satan's advantage, he first tries to bribe Zane, then intimidate him into going back to work.

Zane, however, has had a conversation with Gaea, the Incarnation of Nature, who has demonstrated to him the absolute power each Incarnation wields in its own sphere of influence. Zane eventually realises that the office of Death is unassailable by Satan and that he cannot be harmed within the sphere of that office. As an Incarnation, Satan himself has a soul and is subject to Zane's dominion. The conflict ends in a draw and Satan has no choice but to admit defeat.

With Satan's plot exposed, Purgatory changes Luna's destiny and she is free to return to life. Zane lifts his strike, and with Luna under his protection, Satan can no longer interfere with her fate through the means of death.

== Reception ==
In White Dwarf #66, Dave Langford commented "One reason why this book works: matters of life and death deserve such agonizing - the Xanth books waste it on white lies or table manners. Another reason: the mechanics of magic and the after-life are fresh and inventive - whereas Xanth has been worn smooth. Not great literature, but good fun."

In Issue 29 of Abyss, Eric Olson called this "a charmingly macabre book very much in the tradition of Anthony Boucher." Olson noted "Anthony's work is always strong on ideas, but this is one of his first works in which characters are really well defined as more than cut-out figures, and writing skill, ideas, characterization, and wit all work together for a wonderful result." Olson concluded, "This is the best book from Anthony in a long time and I recommend it without qualification."

In his 2002 book Fantasy: The Liberation of Imagination, Richard Mathews wrote On a Pale Horse "explores fantasy's (and Anthony's) unique ability to embody abstractions. In the novel, an incarnation of Death engages in symbolic interactions written with the goal of helping readers come to terms with the inevitable end of life."

== Other reviews ==
- Review by Debbie Notkin (1983) in Locus, #273 October 1983
- Review by Mary S. Weinkauf (1984) in SF & Fantasy Review, April 1984
- Review by Frank Catalano (1984) in Amazing Science Fiction, May 1984
- Review by Neal Wilgus (1985) in Science Fiction Review, Spring 1985
