= The Knights of the Limits =

- First edition
- Author: Barrington J. Bayley
- Cover artist: Richard Hollis
- Language: English
- Genre: Science fiction
- Publisher: Allison & Busby
- Publication date: 1978
- Publication place: United Kingdom
- Media type: Print (hardback & paperback)
- Pages: 218
- ISBN: 0-85031-215-9

The Knights of the Limits is the first science fiction collection by Barrington J. Bayley. The book collects nine short stories published between 1965 and 1978, one of which is original to this volume.

== Contents ==
- "The Exploration of Space" (1972)
- "The Bees of Knowledge" (1975)
- "Exit from City 5" (1971)
- "Me and My Antronoscope" (1973)
- "All the King's Men" (1965)
- "An Overload" (1973)
- "Mutation Planet" (1973)
- "The Problem of Morley's Emission" (1978)
- "The Cabinet of Oliver Naylor" (1976)

== Literary significance and reception ==
Rhys Hughes described The Knights of the Limits as a "superlative collection," containing stories that were "fabrics woven from pure thought" that were "threatening to push the genre over the edge of its own spectrum." Of the stories, he cites "All the King's Men" as among Bayley's best, concluding "[h]e does not need to crank a dynamic by artificial means; once generated, the idea starts a chain-reaction which gives birth to the story."

Brian Stableford reviewed The Knights of the Limits in 1979, summarising the collection thus: "These nine stories constitute a parade of ideas which is unparalleled in modern science fiction. They are drawn eclectically from an astonishingly wide range of sources: from analytical philosophy, mathematics, physics, biology, and psychology. They demonstrate that Bayley possesses an extraordinarily fertile imagination, and a talent for combining the absurd and the abstruse with a dramatic flourish. He is a writer who delights in novel ideas and their exploration, a lover of bizarre juxtapositions. The range of his literary strategies extends from carefree space opera to stylishly satirical mock-intellectualism. Though his melodramas are magnificently surreal, he is perhaps at his best when he is at his most casual, affecting an earnest attitude of scrupulous reportage which throws his inventions into sharper relief."

In Cheap Truth, Bruce Sterling described Bayley as writing science fiction "with the natural fluency of a man who can't help it." In particular, Sterling described the collection as "astonishing reading". Sterling argues that the virtue of the New Wave was "sheer visionary intensity, which Bayley has always had and displays today even more vigorously."

John Clute commented in The Encyclopedia of Science Fiction that The Knights of the Limits was a "remarkable (though astonishingly bleak) assembly of experiments in the carrying of story ideas to the end of their tether."

Michael Moorcock selected The Knights of the Limits as the third of his top ten favorite science fiction books, arguing that the collection was "sharper and more substantial than Borges."
