= Empire of Two Worlds =

1972 novel by Barrington J. Bayley

- First edition
- Author: Barrington J. Bayley
- Cover artist: John Schoenherr
- Language: English
- Genre: Science fiction
- Publisher: Ace Books
- Publication date: 1972
- Publication place: United States
- Media type: Print (Hardcover)
- Pages: 157
- OCLC: 1305522

Empire of Two Worlds is a science fiction novel by English writer Barrington J. Bayley. The main characters are "tankless" inhabitants of a dim and dry colony world who attempt to find a lost gateway back to Earth.

== Literary significance and reception ==
Rhys Hughes said that the novel was "engrossing" but inferior to his contemporary shorter work.

John Clute described Empire of Two Worlds, along with Annihilation Factor and Collision Course, as "variously successful".
