= For Love of Evil =

1988 novel by Piers Anthony

- First edition
- Author: Piers Anthony
- Series: Incarnations of Immortality
- Genre: Fantasy
- Publisher: William Morrow & Co
- Publication date: November 1988
- Media type: Hardcover
- Pages: 383
- ISBN: 978-0-688-08211-6
- OCLC: 17551687
- Dewey Decimal: 813/.54 19
- LC Class: PS3551.N73 F6 1988
- Preceded by: Being a Green Mother
- Followed by: And Eternity

For Love of Evil is a fantasy novel by Piers Anthony. It is the sixth of eight books in the Incarnations of Immortality series.

== Plot summary ==
Parry, an orphan, is taken in and is accidentally adopted by a wizard who teaches him the benefits of white magic and how it can be used to help others. A musician and adept white magician, Parry plans on following in his father's footsteps when he is encouraged by his father, the sorcerer, to take a bride. Parry selects Jolie, seeing her potential despite her ragged appearance. Using his unique singing talents, Parry convinces Jolie that he means no harm. Taking her in, Parry and his father begin to teach Jolie the ways of wizardry and they begin to fall in love. With his father's blessing, Parry and Jolie wed and are about to start a life of bliss when they are attacked by crusaders of Christianity. Parry's father is killed in the attack and Parry escapes in bird form while his wife Jolie had gone ahead to warn her parents to go to the predetermined hidden shelter. Unfortunately by the time Parry gets to town to check on his wife, she has been taken prisoner by the crusaders, who capture Parry himself shortly after he arrives. Working in conjunction with his wife, since he possesses a magical second sight, he frees them both but not before Jolie is slain by the dying Captain who was going to rape her. Taking off in horse form with Jolie strapped to his back, Parry arrives at the shelter and tries to heal her wounds but is lacking in medical supplies to save her. Parry watches as his wife dies in his arms. Due to special circumstances, Jolie's soul cannot immediately go to Heaven, so at Parry's request, Thanatos binds her spirit to a drop of blood on Parry's wrist. Vowing vengeance, Parry thinks the best way to escape from the villagers is to hide in plain sight, so he joins a monastery for sanctuary as well as a means to destroy the enemy. Soon after joining the Franciscan friars, Parry discovers that a new order, the Dominicans, are being formed with the express purpose of rooting out evil and heresy. Because of his keen mind and magical prowess (which he uses in secrecy), he becomes a feared inquisitor. During one of his many trips to stop Lucifer's campaign of Evil, Parry succumbs to the temptation of his ghostly wife Jolie inhabiting a physical body, thus violating his oath of celibacy.

As retribution, Lucifer sends forth Lilah (alternately known as Lilith), a demoness, to corrupt him. By using the toehold of his broken oath of celibacy and his own feelings of sexual desire and guilt, Lilah corrupts Parry to Evil. His intense desire for Lilah eventually leads him to corrupt the Inquisition itself. Upon his deathbed, Lucifer attacks Lilah; with his last vestige of strength, Parry manages a magical counterattack against Lucifer, saving Lilah. Lucifer, taken off guard, is defeated. Though Parry's magic was far weaker than that of Lucifer, his spell was able to work because Jolie's good spirit (which still resided in the drop of blood on Parry's wrist) was immune to Lucifer's powers. As a severely weakened Parry lays dying with only moments to live, Lilah tells him to claim the office before it finds a different successor, as well as to name the form he would like to assume (he chooses his body at the age of 25). Parry, not understanding what she's asking of him and wanting to honor this last wish before he succumbs to death, does as Lilah requests, and is suddenly transformed into the new Incarnation of Evil and takes the name Satan. (It is later explained that if no one claims the office, it seeks out the most qualified person for that position. So if Parry hadn't claimed the office as Lilah had told him, it would have found the most evil person on earth to take Lucifer's place.)

In For Love of Evil, several scenes from the previous books (as is the case with all the books in the series with respect to their Incarnations) are shown from Parry's point of view. Parry also does not believe himself to be evil, but is simply fulfilling his function as an Incarnation. It is rather ironic that Parry is not actually evil, but all of the other Incarnations (Thanatos, Gaea, Mars, and Fate) naturally expect him to be. Parry wants to defeat God so that he can create a better way to separate the good souls from the bad, and he takes no pleasure in causing unnecessary suffering in the mortal world (the other Incarnations obviously believe that Parry's reasons for wanting to defeat God are more nefarious). In fact, Parry, as a personal favour to YHWH (the incarnation of the God of the Jews, called JHVH in this book), manages to prevent the Holocaust from happening.

Upon taking office, Parry approached other Incarnations in good faith, including Nyx, the Goddess of Night, but was rebuffed and/or humiliated by most of them since they allied with God. Only Chronos offered friendship; in fact, his first meeting lead him to learn the means for assuming full power. This led to Parry being enemies with many of these Incarnations and their successors. Parry was friends with several holders of the office of Chronos, but eventually those officeholders turned hostile to him as well.

Parry also attempted to meet with the Incarnation of Good to figure out how to best sort out which souls belonged in Heaven and which in Hell (Parry had no desire for souls that didn't belong in Hell to be there), but was not successful. (The Incarnation of Good was too busy contemplating his own greatness to pay any attention to the affairs of the mortal world.) Instead he strikes a bargain with the Archangel Gabriel: if Parry cannot corrupt one influential individual or her children or grandchildren to shift the balance of the world to evil, he must give up his quest. That individual was Niobe Kaftan—meaning Parry had to wait six centuries before he could act. Lilah served as his main consort through the centuries, but when he assigns her to seduce Mym, the Incarnation of War, she falls in love with him and deserts Parry, depressing him. Upon visiting Nyx, she reminds him of the bargain.

After that, Parry meets Orb, Niobe's daughter who is slated to become the next Gaea, and decides to court her in the hope that he could later take advantage of Gaea's powers to defeat God. The other Incarnations oppose Parry's plan, but eventually they all come to an agreement: the other Incarnations promise not to interfere with Parry's courtship of Orb if he tells her the truth about his identity prior to asking her to marry him. Posing as a mortal named Natasha, Parry manages to win Orb's heart. When she becomes Gaea, he reveals to her that he is the Incarnation of Evil and asks her to marry him. In a fit of rage, Orb nearly destroys the world with her powers, and to undo that destruction, she needs Parry's help. Thus she agrees to marry him, and even admits that she still loves him despite his true identity. At the wedding Parry surprises everyone by singing Amazing Grace, which causes him to vacate his office and be imprisoned in Limbo. Orb, coming as Gaea, removes Jolie's drop of blood from Perry.

With no one to take his place, the office automatically goes to the most evil person on earth, a cruel murderer and child rapist. After a battle of wits, Parry eventually reclaims his office, to the relief of the other Incarnations who prefer Parry's doctrine of necessary evil over the murder-rapist's sadism. The Incarnations come to realize at the end that Parry is not truly evil in the traditional sense; rather, he works to facilitate evil on earth because that is a necessary part of the process to determine whether souls belong in Heaven or Hell.

Unable to consummate his marriage to Orb due to their offices being traditionally opposed, Parry initially becomes depressed. But then the spirit of Jolie co-inhabiting the body of Orb comes to him one night and explains that he and the two loves of his life can occasionally spend time together as long as they do so in secret. In the end, Parry is happy and resumes his duties as the Incarnation of Evil.

== Evil's accoutrements ==
Evil functions quite differently from the other Incarnations, and like Nature, does not really have tools of the office. He does, however, get full control of Hell and a veritable army of demons to do his bidding. His only real secret is that of the demon-banishing spell, which keeps him in power – namely, that there is no such spell. The demons' belief that the spell exists is a lie that must be maintained, else it would undermine his power. As such, he is aided nearly exclusively by liberal use of his silver tongue. However, in most cases Evil does have a significant amount of "magical" power available to perform various tricks and effects.

== Method of transfer ==
Evil is much like Death in its manner of transferring power, though with one major exception: It has a break-in period and accompanying test. One becomes the Incarnation of Evil by vanquishing the previous Incarnation, but after that there is a 30-day trial period, where the new Incarnation must learn the secret of controlling demons – namely, that mortals cannot control demons and the only way through is to bluff. Should the new Incarnation fail to figure this out, the previous one has a chance to reclaim his office.

== Literary significance and reception ==
Jackie Cassada in the Library Journal review said "In his most ambitious work yet, Anthony tackles sensitive moral issues with his customary high spirits."
