= Peter Lloyd (illustrator) =

American artist

Peter Lloyd (1944–2009) was a freelance illustrator specializing in advertising and digital artwork. Lloyd was born in England in 1944, but moved to the United States in 1959, where he was the youngest student to graduate from the Art Center College of Design with a master's degree.

Lloyd provided art to several large advertising clients in the 1960s, including National Geographic and the National Football League. He also illustrated for magazines such as Playboy and Esquire. Lloyd also did several famous album covers for the band Kansas.

He held several jobs in the feature film industry during the late 1970s and 1980s, including a job doing conceptual work for Walt Disney Productions in 1982; most notably, Lloyd worked on creating and refining digital effects for the 1982 film Tron. Lloyd has since worked with many other motion picture clients such as Paramount Pictures, often as a conceptual or storyboard artist.

In 1993, Lloyd joined Santa Barbara Studios as an art director for the 1995 film 500 Nations, and later worked extensively with the Smithsonian Air and Space Museum on the 1996 IMAX documentary Cosmic Voyage.

Lloyd has won several awards, including the New York Society of Illustrators Gold Medal Award.
