= Under a Velvet Cloak =

2007 novel by Piers Anthony

- Paperback book cover
- Author: Piers Anthony
- Cover artist: SkyeWolf
- Language: English
- Series: Incarnations of Immortality
- Genre: Fantasy
- Publisher: Mundania Press
- Publication date: 2007-12-05
- Publication place: United States
- Media type: Paperback
- Pages: 228
- ISBN: 978-1-59426-294-4
- OCLC: 192043932
- Preceded by: And Eternity

Under a Velvet Cloak is a fantasy novel by Piers Anthony. It is the last of eight books in the Incarnations of Immortality series. It follows the adventures of the Incarnation of Night.

== Plot summary ==
Perceiving the doom of multiple timelines outside of her own, Orlene, the Incarnation of Good sends Jolie, the ghost-wife of Satan, the Incarnation of Evil, to the history of an alternate timeline, to try and ensure its survival. She resides within the body of Kerena, a 13 year old girl living in the year 500 A.D., during the reign of King Arthur. If she senses a divergence from her own timeline, Jolie can rewind time to realign events, which she utilises on many occasions to preserve the timeline.

Kerena is a girl with Sight and a great potential for magic. She becomes the apprentice, and then lover, of the Seer Morely, who teaches her logic, rational thought and the importance of choosing words carefully, as well as about magic. He also teaches her subtlety and discretion, and warns her about flattery and the tricks people can pull.

After staying in Morely's hometown for a time, Kerena returns from a longer-than-usual shopping trip to find Morely's velvet cloak on the grass outside, with some blood, evidence of recent sexual activity, and Morely nowhere to be found. Very quickly remembering Morely's lessons in logic, Kerena methodically sets out to find him.

Realising it is the quickest way to earn money for herself, and gather information from many influential people at the same time without arousing suspicion, Kerena goes to Camelot and becomes a prostitute. She is placed in the best room in the brothel, and she is so popular with their clientele that the whole establishment prospers. She even impresses a wealthy merchant with her roleplay skills, to the extent that he hires her as a live-in mistress, while his wife cannot have sex comfortably. In exchange, he helps her gather information about Morely.

Kerena is able to remedy the wife's discomfort with a Fertility icon Morely gave her, thus eliminating her need to remain. She is immediately picked up afterwards by Morgan le Fey, who employs her as a spy. During her time with le Fey, Kerena perfects her seduction skills, including a lesson from le Fey herself, and has a night time encounter with a shadowy being. From hereon, Kerena regularly engages in sexual activity, in order to gather information, placate others, as payment in lieu of coin, or many other reasons.

Her time with Morgan le Fey culminates with the mission to seduce Sir Gawain from his quest for the Holy Grail. Instead, Kerena falls in love with him, to the extent that she is willing to balk her mission for his wellbeing. He falls in love with her as well, abandoning his quest, and the two engage in sex every day on the way back to the capital. After returning, Kerena spends two months crying over the breakup.

After one last magic lesson, Kerena learns how to locate Morely. She employs a soldier called Gordon, who is not interested in having sex with her, to keep her safe, and makes her way gradually to Scotland where Morely is. On the way, Kerena finds she is pregnant by Gawain. Using a spell learned from Morely, Kerena had been stopping herself from getting pregnant while in the brothel, and while working for Morgan le Fey, but forgot to use it while with Gawain.

She discovers Morely, now called Vorely, was turned and taken by a vampiress called Vanja, and he chose to leave with her to prevent bringing Kerena trouble. Now that they're together again, Kerena chooses to become a vampire by Vanja, staying at the vampire warren with Vorely, and delivering her baby. As a vampire her desire for, and pleasure during, sex is increased greatly.

Using her Sight on her baby, Gawain Two, she discovers a taint on his soul, which came about as a result of her turning into a vampress while still pregnant. She leaves Gawain Two with Sir Gawain, then leaves immediately to ask the seven Incarnations of Immortality for help in curing him, but is either rejected, ignored or threatened. During her encounter with Chronos, the Incarnation of Time, she discovers Jolie's presence in her body, and the reason for her interference in her life until now.

Despite only being in Purgatory for a short while, she returns to Vorely and Vanja 30 years later, by which time both Gawains have died, leading Kerena to swear vengeance on the other Incarnations for balking her.

After a great deal of research, involving time-travelling to the beginning of the universe, with the help of the ghost Lilah, originally Lilith and the first wife of Adam, Kerena puzzles the nature of secrets, and becomes Nox, the Incarnation of Night and Mistress of Secrets. Over the next millennium and a half, she time-travels to find out how to hold secrets, leading to the Purgatory computer used by the Incarnations in the previous stories, meets Niobe 5 years before the events of With A Tangled Skein, gathers the secrets of all mortals, and strikes up regular "liaisons" with Kermit from the 21st Century and the Angel Gabriel, and many other amours. She witnesses the events of all the previous books.

Kerena encounters the shadowy being again, who reveals himself to be Erebus, the Incarnation of Darkness, Nox's brother, father to the other Incarnations, just as Nox is the mother. He is also the cause of the destruction of all other timelines, due to jealousy and a desire for more power. The office is held by Cain, the son of Adam. Owing to a manipulation by Erebus, in a previous decision by Kerena to let a diverging choice stand, the timeline is now doomed. Erebus offers a wager, "double or nothing", to risk destroying the original timeline in order to restore all timelines. Kerena accepts, and through Jolie convinces an initially reluctant set of Incarnations from the first timeline, while also insuring her baby GawTwo is installed as the Incarnation of Dreams.

The contest is held in a dreamscape, and the competition is the procreative sexual encounter needed for the creation of the office of Dreams, with Erebus and Nox armed with loops which can paralyse their opponent's body parts for a minute at a time. Each must complete the sexual act while the mist they are competing in is lit with their chosen colour in order to win; blue for Erebus, and pink for Nox. Using strategy, and taking advantage of Erebus' desire to torture Nox, Nox wins the contest and absorbs Erebus' essence into herself, and immediately giving birth to a baby, which will become the Office of Dreams.

Kerena throws a shared-dream party in celebration of her victory, and the chance to save the other timelines. She invites a number of individuals who were essential in her life, including Morely, Gawain and Morgan le Fey. During this dream, a number of couples disappear for "liaisons": Nox with Gawain, Vanja with Morely, Satan with Lilah, Kermit with Molly the ghost-girl, and Gawain Two with Morgan le Fey. Orlene convenes a meeting to arrange how to save the next timeline. Jolie from the second timeline volunteers to go and guide the next Kerena, and the cycle begins again.
