= Incarnations of Immortality =

Fantasy series by Piers Anthony

Incarnations of Immortality is an eight-book fantasy series by Piers Anthony. The books each focus on one of eight supernatural "offices" (Death, Time, Fate, War, Nature, Evil, Good, and Night) in a fictional reality and history parallel to ours, with the exception that society has advanced both magic and modern technology. The series covers the adventures and struggles of a group of humans called "Incarnations", who hold these supernatural positions for a certain time.

The title alludes to William Wordsworth's 1804 poem "Ode: Intimations of Immortality".

== Bibliography ==
- On a Pale Horse (1983)
- Bearing an Hourglass (1984)
- With a Tangled Skein (1985)
- Wielding a Red Sword (1986)
- Being a Green Mother (1987)
- For Love of Evil (1988)
- And Eternity (1990)
- Under a Velvet Cloak (2007)

== Characters ==
=== Family tree ===
Cedric | Niobe (Fate) | Pacian | Blanche
Mym (War) | Orb (Nature) | Parry (Evil)
Gawain | Orlene (Good) | Norton (Time)
Gawain II
Magician (Cedric Jr.) | Blenda
Luna | Zane (Death)

Note: Colors for each of the Incarnations used are from the covers of their respective books.
Note: Gawain II was conceived by Norton and Orlene, but has Gawain's genetic material instead of Norton's (a favor performed by Gaea)

Relationships:

- Zane (Thanatos, the Incarnation of Death) is the lover and protector of Luna Kaftan (Niobe's granddaughter).
- Norton (Chronos, the Incarnation of Time) is the lover of Orlene (who becomes Good) as well as the lover of Clotho.
- Niobe (Clotho, and later Lachesis, Aspects of the Incarnation of Fate) is Orb's (Gaea) mother, and grandmother to Luna (Death's lover), and Orlene (Good). She is also lover to Chronos.
- Mym (Mars, the Incarnation of War) is father to Orlene (Good) and former lover of Orb (Gaea).
- Orb (Gaea, Mother Nature) is mother to Orlene (Good), daughter to Niobe (Clotho/Lachesis, Fate), and former lover of Mym (War).
- Parry (Satan, the Incarnation of Evil) is married to Orb (Mother Nature), and stepfather to Orlene (Good).
- Orlene (God, sometimes called "the Goddess", the Incarnation of Good) is Nature's daughter, War's daughter, Fate's granddaughter, Time's lover and mother to his biological son (prior to either of them taking their office), Evil's stepdaughter, and Death's wife's cousin.

In "Under a Velvet Cloak", Kerena (Nox, Incarnation of Night) is the lover of the original Sir Gawain, Knight of the Round Table, and mother of the original Gawain (Gaw-Two) who was tainted at birth and destined to die early. Kerena's quest to save Gaw-Two is what eventually leads her to become Nox, the Incarnation of Night and Keeper of Secrets. Gawain (Orlene's ghost husband) is the direct descendant of Sir Gawain, and carries the family taint, so the second Gaw-Two, born to Orlene and Ghost Gawain, is also tainted and destined to die early. Nox is also the great-aunt (many times removed) to Niobe and her children and grandchildren.

=== Lesser Incarnations ===
- Hypnos: Incarnation of Sleep
- JHVH: Incarnation of the Jewish God

==== Lesser Incarnations serving Nature/Gaea ====
- Eros: Incarnation of Love
- Hope: Incarnation of Hope
- Phobos & Deimos: Named after the Greek gods of fear and panic. These lesser Incarnations act as assistants to Gaea (Nature). Their functions are not explained in the books (although presumably they have similar natures to their Greek equivalents).

==== Lesser Incarnations serving War/Mars ====
- Pestilence: disease in general, but especially consistent with the aftermath of battles.
- Conquest: manager of individual battles
- Famine: starvation consistent with battles (although this incarnation has served Death/Thanatos on at least one occasion)
- Slaughter: a representation of the bloodshed associated with battles
- The essentials formed a covenant

== Cultural references ==
- The Showtime series Dead Like Me was inspired by the book On a Pale Horse.
- In 2007, Anthony wrote that Disney had sold the TV rights to On a Pale Horse to Touchstone/ABC, which were "filming a pilot program". In 2009 Javier Grillo-Marxuach wrote a pilot for the series for ABC, but it was not picked up.
