= Barrington J. Bayley =

English science-fiction writer (1937–2008)

- Born: 9 April 1937; Birmingham, England
- Died: 14 October 2008 (aged 71); Shrewsbury, England
- Occupation: Fiction writer
- Spouse: Joan
- Children: 2
- Writing career
- Pen name: Alan Aumbry; Michael Barrington (with Michael Moorcock); John Diamond; P. F. Woods
- Genre: Science fiction
- Movement: New Wave

Barrington J. Bayley (9 April 1937 – 14 October 2008) was an English science fiction writer.

== Biography ==
Bayley was born in Birmingham, England, and educated in Newport, Shropshire. He worked a number of jobs, including as reporter for the Wellington Journal, before joining the Royal Air Force during 1955; his first published story, "Combat's End", had been printed the year before in Vargo Statten Magazine.

During the late 1950s, Bayley became friends and a frequent collaborator with Michael Moorcock on features, comics and short stories, chiefly for Fleetway Publications where he was also a regular writer of text stories, such as "The Astounding Jason Hyde" (reprinted by Rebellion Developments in 2022). He later wrote sf stories for New Worlds magazine and Moorcock, who described himself as "the dumb one in the partnership". He, Moorcock and J. G. Ballard met regularly and their discussions and theories led to the development of science fiction's New Wave. Bayley's short stories featured regularly in New Worlds and then later in various New Worlds paperback anthologies. His first book, The Star Virus (1970), was followed by more than a dozen other novels, and his short stories were collected in The Knights of the Limits (1978) and The Seed of Evil (1979). His downbeat, gloomy themes have been cited as influential on the likes of M. John Harrison, William S. Burroughs, Brian Stableford, Bruce Sterling, Iain Banks and Alastair Reynolds.

Bayley, who came to live at Donnington, Telford, died of complications from bowel cancer on 14 October 2008. During 2001, he had written an outline for a sequel to Eye of Terror, provisionally titled An Age of Adventure. The novel was unreleased at the time of his death but rumours and listings of copies have circulated, including claims of a 2002 release date and a page count of 288. The book still makes appearances in lists of his works, including the bibliography in the ebooks of Bayley's works released by the Gollancz SF Gateway. His literary estate is managed by Michael Moorcock.

== Works ==
Bayley used the pseudonyms S. Barrington Bayley, P.F Woods, J. Barrington Bayley, Alan Aumbry, Michael Barrington, Simon Barclay, and John Diamond.

=== Novels ===
Name	Year	Comments
The Star Virus	1970	expansion of a 1964 short story of the same name
Annihilation Factor	1972	expansion of "The Patch" from 1964
Empire of Two Worlds	1972	
Collision Course	1973	aka Collision with Chronos
The Fall of Chronopolis	1974	
The Soul of the Robot	1974	
The Garments of Caean	1976	
The Grand Wheel	1977	
Star Winds	1978	
The Pillars of Eternity	1982	
The Zen Gun	1983	
The Forest of Peldain	1985	
The Rod of Light	1985	
Eye of Terror	1999	A Warhammer 40,000 novel
The Sinners of Erspia	2002	
The Great Hydration	2002	

=== Collections ===
Name	Year	As	Comments
The Knights of the Limits	1978	Barrington Bayley	Collection of nine short stories
The Seed of Evil	1979		Collection of thirteen short stories

=== Short stories ===
- "Combat's End" (a.k.a. "Cosmic Combatants") (1954)
- "Cold Death" (1955)
- "Last Post" (1955)
- "Kindly Travellers" (1955)
- "The Bargain" (1955)
- "Martyrs Appointed" (1955)
- "Fugitive" (1956)
- "The Reluctant Death" (1956)
- "Consolidation" (1959)
- "Peace on Earth" (with Michael Moorcock) (1959)
- "The Tank" (1961)
- "The Radius Riders" (1962)
- "Double Time" (1962)
- "The Big Sound" (1962)
- "The Ship That Sailed the Ocean of Space" (a.k.a. "Fishing Trip") (1962)
- "Solo Flight" (1963)
- "Flux" (with Michael Moorcock) (1963)
- "Natural Defence" (1963)
- "Return Visit" (1963)
- "Farewell, Dear Brother" (1964)
- "The Countenance" (1964)
- "Integrity" (1964)
- "The Star Virus" (1964)
- "The Patch" (1964)
- "All the King's Men" (1965)
- "The Ship of Disaster" (1965)
- "Reactionary" (1965)
- "Catspaw" (1965)
- "A Taste of the Afterlife" (with Charles Platt) (1966)
- "Aid to Nothing" (1967)
- "The Four-Color Problem" (1971)
- "Exit From City 5" (1971)
- "Man in Transit" (1972)
- "The Exploration of Space" (1972)
- "The Seed of Evil" (1973)
- "Mutation Planet" (1973)
- "An Overload" (1973)
- "Me and My Antronoscope" (1973)
- "Maladjustment" (1974)
- "The Bees of Knowledge" (1975)
- "The Cabinet of Oliver Naylor" (1976)
- "The Problem of Morley's Emission" (1978)
- "Rome Vindicated" (1978)
- "Sporting with the Chid" (1979)
- "Life Trap" (1979)
- "Perfect Love" (1979)
- "The Infinite Searchlight" (1979)
- "Wizard Wazo's Revenge" (1979)
- "The God Gun" (1979)
- "The Forever Racket" (1980)
- "The Ur-Plant" (1983)
- "Escapist Literature" (1985)
- "When They Asked Him What Happens" (1988)
- "Death Ship" (1989)
- "Cling to the Curvature!" (1989)
- "Tommy Atkins" (1989)
- "The Death of Arlett" (1989)
- "The Phobeya" (with Sean Bayley) (1990)
- "Galimatias" (1990)
- "Culture Shock" (1990)
- "Light" (1991)
- "The Remembrance" (1991)
- "Don't Leave Me" (1992)
- "Doctor Pinter in the Mythology Isles" (1992)
- "Why Live? Dream!" (1992)
- "Quiddity Wars" (1992)
- "Teatray in the Sky" (1992)
- "This Way into the Wendy House" (1993)
- "Love in Backspace" (1994)
- "Gnostic Endings: Flight to the Hypercosmos" (1994)
- "On the Ledge" (1994)
- "Get Out of Here" (1995)
- "Duel Among the Wine Green Suns" (with Michael Moorcock) (1995)
- "The Island of Dr. Romeau" (1995)
- "A Crab Must Try" (1996)
- "The Crear" (1996)
- "Children of the Emperor" (Warhammer 40K) (1998)
- "The Lives of Ferag Lion-Wolf" (Warhammer 40K) (1999)
- "The Sky Tower" (2000)
- "Battle of the Archeosaurs" (Warhammer 40K) (2000)
- "Planet of the Stercorasaurs" (2000)
- "Hive Fleet Horror" (Warhammer 40K) (2000)
- "The Worms of Hess" (2000)
- "The Revolt of the Mobiles" (2000)
- "It Was a Lover and His Lass" (2001)
- "Domie" (2001)
- "The Multiplex Fixative" (2003)
- "Party Smart Card" (2006)
- "Formic Gender Disorder" (2008)
