= Bearing an Hourglass =

Novel by Piers Anthony

- First edition (p/b)
- Author: Piers Anthony
- Series: Incarnations of Immortality
- Genre: Fantasy
- Publisher: Del Rey Books
- Publication date: 1984-07-12
- Media type: Hardcover
- Pages: 293
- ISBN: 978-0-345-31314-0
- OCLC: 10507643
- Dewey Decimal: 813/.54 19
- LC Class: PS3551.N73 B4 1984
- Preceded by: On A Pale Horse
- Followed by: With a Tangled Skein

Bearing an Hourglass is a fantasy novel by Piers Anthony that was published by Del Rey Books in 1984. It is the second of eight books in the Incarnations of Immortality series, and focuses on Chronos, the Incarnation of Time.

== Plot summary ==
A man named Norton is living a life of nomadic wandering when a ghost named Gawain asks him to father a child with his wife, Orlene, with whom Norton eventually falls in love. Gaea, the Incarnation of Nature, makes the child in Gawain's likeness so his bloodline would continue. Unfortunately, due to a recessive disease that runs in Gawain's family, the child dies, and Orlene commits suicide shortly after.

While mourning Orlene, he is approached by Gawain, who offers Norton the office of Time (Chronos), who rules over all Earthly aspects of time. Chronos lives backwards in time until the moment of their conception. Because this would enable Norton to continue see Orlene while she was still alive in the past, he accepts and he immediately starts living life backwards in time, invisible to mortals, although he can temporarily go forward to interact with others.

Because Norton lives backwards in time, his past is everyone else's future, making him an isolated character even among the other Incarnations. He soon realises that this will make it impossible to have a relationship with the forward-living Orlene.

At his new residence in Purgatory, Norton is then visited by Satan, who informs Norton that while he can travel anywhere in time with his hourglass, he cannot leave Earth. Satan claims to have the power to travel the whole universe, since evil permeates all of reality, and offers Norton the ability to have that power if Norton will go back in time 20 years and save a man from committing suicide.

After consulting with the other Incarnations, Norton is informed that this man, Zane — first seen in the previous novel — is the current office holder of the Incarnation of Death, and that it is Zane's attempted suicide that brought him to that position. This man is needed as Thanatos to protect his girlfriend, Luna Kaftan, from Satan's mischief so she can go into politics and fulfill a prophecy of thwarting Satan.

Not giving up, Satan tries one more time by trapping Norton on one of the other planets he had an adventure on. But Norton soon realizes he is not on another planet but in an elaborate stage on Earth, Satan having used brainwashed actors and Chronos's hourglass to control the flow of time to manipulate Norton.

When Norton breaks free from this elaborate stage, he discovers that the demon that created the illusion had travelled back in the past to create a campaign to discredit Luna so she doesn't run for office. Norton follows the demon and uses his hourglass to show the world all the bad things that will happen if Luna doesn't get elected. Norton then traps Satan in a time loop, and Satan realises he no longer has the power of persuasion over Norton.

== Publication history ==
In 1983, Piers Anthony started a new series of novels, Incarnations of Immortality, each one focussed on the Immortals who control powerful elemental forces such as Death and Time. The first of these was On a Pale Horse. The second book in the series, Bearing an Hourglass, was published in 1984 by Del Rey Books.

== Reception ==
Jackie Cassada, in the Library Journal, noted "Amid weighty and often convoluted speculations about the nature of good and evil, time and space, and magic and science, Anthony's irrepressible humor asserts itself in unexpected ways. Far from being grim – or even allegorical – this sequel to On a Pale Horse will appeal to Anthony's large readership."

In Issue 31 of Abyss, Dave Nalle liked the first part of the book, calling it "rather interesting, developing a fascinating character in a situation which holds our interest rather well until he becomes an Incarnation and the story begins to fall apart." Nalle noted "It is rather hard for a plot to gel when the hero has not yet met other characters who see themselves as his old friends, and he is constantly trying to catch up on his own past which he has not yet experienced." Nalle felt that the plot "falls apart about halfway through the story, and the ending which is reached rather abruptly is somewhat dependent on the first book in the series." Nalle concluded, "If Anthony can pull the rest of the series up to the level of his first volume, On a Pale Horse, it would be among his best work, but he will have to avoid the technical problems which mar Bearing an Hourglass."

In White Dwarf #70, Dave Langford was not impressed, commenting "The interesting ideas get buried in the dross."
