= Rhys Hughes =

Welsh writer (born 1966)

Rhys Henry Hughes
- Born: 1966 (age 59–60); Cardiff, Wales
- Occupations: Novelist, short story writer
- Writing career
- Genres: Absurdism, Fantasy, OuLiPo, Science fiction
- Website: rhysaurus.blogspot.com

Rhys Henry Hughes (born 1966, Cardiff, Wales) is a Welsh fantasy writer, playwright and essayist.

== Career ==
Born in Cardiff, Hughes has written in a variety of forms, from short stories to novels.

His long novel Engelbrecht Again! is a sequel to Maurice Richardson's 1950 cult classic The Exploits of Engelbrecht and is the most radical of Hughes's books, making extensive use of lipograms, typographical tricks, coded passages and other OuLiPo techniques.

His major project consisted of authoring a 1,000-story cycle of both tightly and loosely interconnected tales, a project that was completed in 2022.

His books have had introductions and afterwords provided by Michael Moorcock, Jeff VanderMeer, A.A. Attanasio, Michael Cisco, Paul Di Filippo, John Clute, E.F. Bleiler and others.

== Bibliography ==
=== Novels ===
- The Percolated Stars: An Astro-Caffeine Romp in Three Cups Featuring Batavus Droogstoppel Merchant and Scientist and Bourgeois Monster: One Lump or Two? (RazorBlade Press; 2003)
- Engelbrecht Again! (Dead Letter Press; 2008; ISBN 978-0-9796335-4-6)
- Mister Gum; Or: The Possibly Phoney Profundity of Puerility (Dog Horn Publishing; 2009)
- Twisthorn Bellow (Atomic Fez Publishing; 2010; ISBN 978-0-9811597-1-3)
- The Abnormalities of Stringent Strange (Meteor House; 2013; ISBN 978-0-983746-13-3)
- The Young Dictator (Pillar International Publishing; 2013; ISBN 978-0-9574598-3-0)
- Captains Stupendous; Or, the Fantastical Family Faraway (expansion of The Coandă Effect: A Corto Maltese Adventure) (Telos Moonrise; 2014; ISBN 978-1-84583-886-7
- The Pilgrim's Regress (Gloomy Seahorse Press; 2014; ISBN 979-8-697441-96-1)
- Cloud Farming in Wales (Snuggly Books; 2017; ISBN 978-1-943813-36-0)
- The Honeymoon Gorillas (Bizarro Pulp Press; 2018; ISBN 978-1-947654-55-6)
- The Wistful Wanderings of Perceval Pitthelm (Telos Publishing; 2023; ISBN 978-1-845832-12-4)
- Growl at the Moon (Telos Publishing; 2024; ISBN 978-1-845832-38-4)
- The Devil's Halo (Elsewhen Press; 2025; ISBN 978-1-915304-60-5)
- Trumpet Face (Incunabula Media; 2025; ISBN 978-1-300047-00-1)
- A Tendency of Ghosts (TBC)

=== Novellas ===
- Eyelidiad (1996)
- Rawhead & Bloody Bones (1998)
- Elusive Plato (1998)
- The Crystal Cosmos (PS Publishing; December 2007; ISBN 978-1-905834-98-3)
- The Coandă Effect (Ex Occidente Press; November 2010)
- The Sticky Situations of Zwicky Fingers (Gloomy Seahorse Press; 2014; ISBN 978-1-291738-16-2)
- World Muses (Ex Occidente Press; 2017)
- Students of Myself (Elsewhen Press; 2014; ISBN 978-1-911409-69-4)
- My Rabbit's Shadow Looks Like a Hand (Eibonvale Press; 2021; ISBN 978-1-913766-05-4)
- The Ghost Loser (Gibbon Moon Books; 2022; ISBN 978-1-739797-14-0)
- Three Novellas (The Darktree Wheel, The Impossible Inferno, The Swine Taster) (Gibbon Moon Books; 2022; ISBN 978-1-739797-13-3)
- Robots in Love (Eibonvale Press; 2025; ISBN 978-1-913766-34-4)

=== Collections ===
- Worming the Harpy and Other Bitter Pills (Tartarus Press, 1995; ISBN 978-1-872621-20-3)
- The Smell of Telescopes (Tartarus Press, 2000; ISBN 1-872621-44-9)
- Stories from a Lost Anthology (Tartarus Press, 2002; ISBN 978-1-872621-68-5)
- Nowhere Near Milk Wood (1997, expanded 2002)
- Journeys Beyond Advice (2002)
- A New Universal History of Infamy (2004): a parody of and homage to Jorge Luis Borges's collection A Universal History of Infamy.
- The Less Lonely Planet (Humdrumming, Ltd.; May 2008; ISBN 978-1-905532-52-0)
- The Postmodern Mariner (Screaming Dreams; June 2008; ISBN 978-0-9555185-2-2)
- The Brothel Creeper (Gray Friar Press; March 2011; ISBN 978-1-906331-22-1)
- Link Arms With Toads! (Chômu Press; May 2011; ISBN 978-1-907681-08-0)
- Tallest Stories (Eibonvale Press; January 2013; ISBN 978-1-908125-16-3)
- The Just Not So Stories (Exaggerated Press; October 2013; ISBN 978-1-291558-20-3)
- More Than a Feline (Gloomy Seahorse Press; December 2013; ISBN 978-1-291619-27-0)
- Flash in the Pantheon (Gloomy Seahorse Press; 2014; ISBN 978-1-291731-03-3)
- Rhysop's Fables (Gloomy Seahorse Press; 2014; ISBN 978-1-291738-73-5)
- Bone Idle in the Charnel House (Hippocampus Press; 2014; ISBN 978-1-61498-087-2)
- Orpheus on the Underground (Tartarus Press; 2015; ISBN 978-1-905784-71-4)
- Mirrors in the Deluge (Elsewhen Press; 2015; ISBN 978-1-908168-65-8)
- Brutal Pantomimes (Egaeus Press; 2016; ISBN 978-0-957160-69-9)
- Salty Kiss Island (Immanion Press; 2017; ISBN 978-1-907737-77-0)
- How Many Times? (Eibonvale Press; 2018; ISBN 978-1-908125-60-6)
- Crepuscularks and Phantomimes (Raphus Press; 2020)
- Weirdly Out West (Black Scat Books; 2021; ISBN 978-1-735764-61-0)
- Utopia in Trouble (Raphus Press; 2021)
- Comfy Rascals (Raphus Press;2022)
- The Senile Pagodas (Centipede Press; 2022; ISBN 978-1-61347-080-0)
- Adventures With Immortality (Oddness Books; 2023; ISBN 978-1-96021-328-0)
- The Eleventh Commandment (Recital Publishing; 2025; ISBN 979-8-988670-23-0)
- That Other Egypt (Eibonvale Press; 2025; ISBN 978-1-913766-36-8)

=== Poetry ===
- The Gloomy Seahorse (Gloomy Seahorse Press; 2014; ISBN 978-1-291715-03-3)
- Bunny Queue (ImpSpired Press; 2021; ISBN 978-1-914130-32-8)
- Robot Poems (Gibbon Moon Books; 2022; ISBN 978-1-739797-16-4)

=== Ebooks ===
- The Rhys Hughes Fantastic MEGAPACK® (Wildside Press; 2022)
