= Gene Arnold =

American radio and TV personality (1941–2019)

Gene Arnold (July 11, 1941 - November 18, 2019), nicknamed "Giant Gene" by his fans at record hops and dances, was an American radio and television personality from Philadelphia.

== Early career ==
Arnold, whose real name was Arnold Eugene Rubin, began his musical career in the 1950s, appearing on American Bandstand as a singing teenager in 1956. Dick Clark gave him the stage name 'Rick Roman.' As Rick Roman, he recorded, wrote and performed in rock n roll shows. He also wrote or contributed lyric lines or ideas to many of the top hits of the 1960s and early 1970s. He later wrote many jingles.

Arnold wrote and produced records under the Rick Roman name, including for The Tridels, The Good Guys, The Stylettes, SanDee, Worldwide Limited Record.

== Career ==
=== 1966-1988 ===
In 1966, Arnold began his radio career on WEEZ-AM and then WIFI-FM with Ron Josephs. Josephs and Arnold played "oldies" and had record hops and dances as well. One evening, Gene did not bring his record case and found a group of albums on the station floor. He had to play something on the air, so he discovered sounds he had never heard before. The audience loved them and the phones rang off their hooks. His love for progressive rock began at that moment, causing a rift between Josephs and Arnold about that "awful" music by groups like The Doors, Jefferson Airplane, and 13th Floor Conspiracy. Arnold has been written about in many books, including a new one from T. Morgan, longtime Philadelphia Album Rock DJ, who credits Arnold with the beginning of the album rock format in the book.

Arnold later continued at WCAM with his very popular "AM Underground" and "heavy 13" format. Philadelphia Disc Jockey Jerry Blavat included a story of his dislike for Arnold's music in his new book, and went onto detail at a recent meeting of the Philadelphia Broadcast Pioneers (of which both were members). He then was hired to bring a youthful format to longtime CBS giant WCAU (with his "Gene Arnold's American Scene" talk show), and at WIBG (with "Giant Gene's Electric Scene"). He was also a regular on many TV shows and hosted the Jerry Lewis telethon (among others) in Philadelphia for several years in the 1970s. Arnold was also in the movie Fighting Back, which was filmed in Philadelphia, and recently appeared in a Tim and Eric episode, in the film "The Nail", and in episodes of "Law and Order", "Mercy", and "Lights Out". He is now featured in an award-winning film, "Wages Of Spin 2", which is now in the Rock N Roll Hall Of Fame archives.

=== Associations with Philadelphia progressive-rock groups ===
Arnold and his wife Terry helped pioneer many of the early Philadelphia progressive-rock groups such as The Nazz, American Dream, Stone Dawn, Woody's Truck Stop, Mandrake Memorial, Elizabeth, and The Legions, Stone Dawn, Almond Joy, The Driftwoods, by hosting the first "Be-IN" at Belmont Plateau in Philadelphia's Fairmount Park. He was involved heavily in promoting and serving as master of ceremonies (MC) for the first Earth Day concert, to which he drove his propane-powered car. He also acted as Master of Ceremonies for many of the top concerts at the Electric Factory and The Spectrum, including concerts by Jimi Hendrix and The Doors, as well as Steppenwolf, Chicago, Janis Joplin and The Who. Arnold was also a favorite MC of The Allman Brothers. He also introduced acts at the famed Main Point in Bryn Mawr PA, including Cat Stevens and Stevie Wonder.

=== Advertising business ===
After working in radio and TV for years, he formed American Agency with his cousin. Later Arnold started his own business, Gene Arnold & Company, to produce advertising and marketing for new and popular companies like Merry Go Round, Deb Shops, Barbara Moss, and Jean Nicole. Arnold, also was chosen to appear in thousands of radio and TV spots and infomercials as "himself" acting as the spokesman or voice. Included are well-remembered spots for Philadelphia's famed Melrose Diner, for LifeCall (famous for the line, "I've fallen and I can't get up!"), for Beta Vision Productions, Craftmatic adjustable beds, and Brazil Contempo Leather, featuring Terry Arnold wearing black gloves and sensuously stroking leather furniture. Arnold also rode elephants on TV spots for Allstate Transmissions ("No Matter What You Drive", and climbed to the top of the Benjamin Franklin Bridge to direct and appear in a commercial bringing the new Buicks to South Jersey. A real flying hawk led the way, flying through the bridge cables. The hawk was Buick's symbol for years. He was also a "tired mummer" in an ad for Lazy Boy Chairs, and built his agency into a nationwide Teen Fashion marketing giant.

=== Post 1988 ===
Arnold was injured in a car accident in 1988, and was forced to retire from his ad agency creative work. In 2001, after encouragement from his son Jody, and with the assistance of Rich Levin and Bob Davis of Soul-Patrol.net and web hosts Netcetra.com, much of his original broadcasts have been updated and made publicly available. In an interview, Arnold said of this re-release:

"It's great therapy to hear from listeners and viewers you pleased a long time ago who've now found you on the web...I can't do "live" radio now due to an accident that took my spontaneous creative thinking process, but still enjoy communicating with the help of editing, re-takes, and of course, my wife, who keeps it all together for us. That way, nobody hears the mistakes or mispronounced words that occasionally pop out, but he states it's still lots of fun to do the updates for our original broadcasts."

On August 24, 2004, Gene MC'ed at the Brotherly Love All-Star Tour, which included performances by his long-time friendsCharlie Gracie, The Soul Survivors, Essra Mohawk, Stewkey's NAZZ, American Dream, and The Orlons, who were all friends with Arnold during their careers.

On July 23, 2011, Arnold was presented the "Lifetime Achievement Award In Soul Music" and "Black Legends Of Music" award, has been entered into the "Disco DJ Hall Of Fame" (now part of The Library Of Congress), and the "Philly TV and Radio Hall Of Fame." He was also recently voted 25th on DJ's Portal's "All Time Top Disco DJ" list compiled by Europe's popular DJ Yahu, He is also a member of The Broadcast Pioneers.

Arnold's last projects include narrating for the documentary films "Dummy Hoy, A Deaf Baseball Hero", and "Survivors Stories, WW2." Terry Arnold, under the stage name 'Terryl', recently appeared in films "eBay Disco Ball" and a spoof on "The Price Is Right" as "Goldie Goforit" an enthusiastic contestant. New movie star Brooklyn Decker played the model, with long-time Hollywood actor Jack English as Bob Barker. Both Terry and Gene are featured in a television documentary on Jimi Hendrix. Recently, an ASCAP composition co-written by Terry with Russ Edwards, a long-time Philly folk-rock-country personality, "I Won't Quit Now"..was released on his CD "They Call Them Cowboys." Both Arnold and Edwards have suffered long-term cognitive damage from auto accidents, and the song is an encouragement to "never quit"..even if you don't make sense to your own self sometimes. Terry Arnold has a new CD called "Here With You", a love song benefiting the USO and Wounded Warriors, and is available on cdbaby.com, iTunes.com, and amazon.com.

== Family and death ==
Arnold married Terry Hunter, herself a singer and entertainer, on June 24, 1962. They were part of "The Sounds Of Philly" scene for years.

He died on November 18, 2019, after a long battle with cancer.
