= Elizabeth (band) =

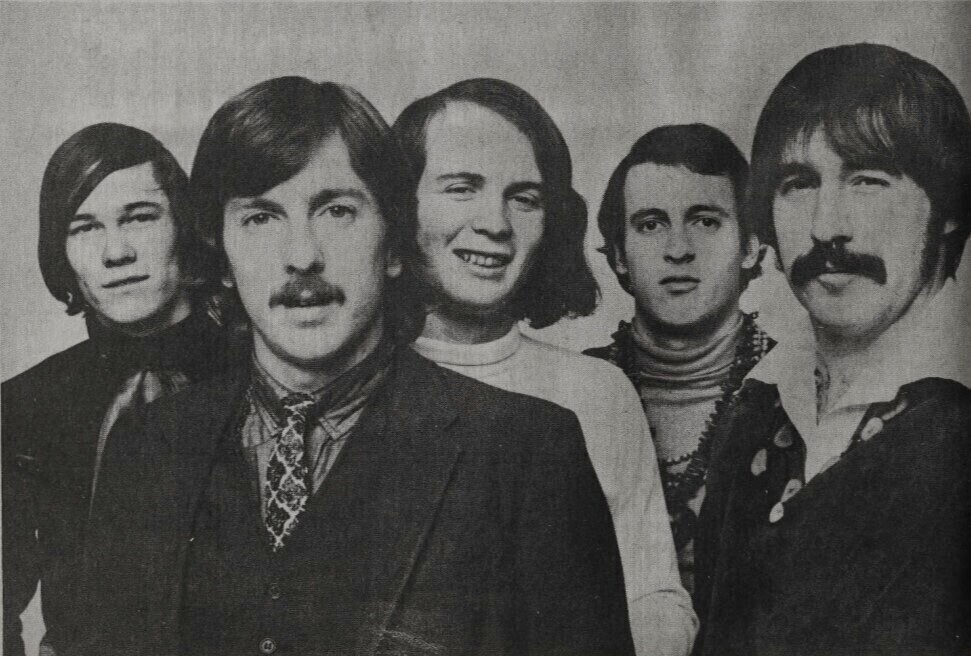

Background information
- Origin: Philadelphia, Pennsylvania, United States
- Genres: Psychedelic rock, Progressive rock
- Years active: 1968-1970
- Labels: Vanguard Records
- Past members: Steve Weingarten; Bob Patterson; Jim Dahme; Steve Paul Bruno; Hank Ransome

Elizabeth was an American psychedelic rock/progressive rock band that were active from 1967 to 1970. They were based out of Philadelphia and known for their unique musical and sonic blend of baroque, classical, folk, American rock, British rock, country, and ragtime. Elizabeth's members were: Steve Weingarten (lead guitar, keyboards, backing vocals), who died in 2007; Bob Patterson (rhythm guitar, lead and backing vocals); Jim Dahme (flute, lead and backing vocals); Steve Paul Bruno (bass, organ, backing vocals); and, Hank Ransome (drums).

== History ==
In 1968, the band recorded and released their self-titled album on Vanguard Records (produced by Sam Charters). Vanguard's artist roster at the time included Joan Baez, Buffy Sainte-Marie and Country Joe and the Fish. Elizabeth performed with Cream, Blue Cheer, Joni Mitchell, Ritchie Havens, The Chambers Brothers and many other musical luminaries of that era. Some of the bands' many Philadelphia area performances included concerts and sets at: The Main Point, The Second Fret, The Electric Factory, and most Be-INs at Belmont Plateau in Philadelphia's Fairmount Park.

As the band was starting to come together (nameless at that point), Steve and Robert "Stewkey" Antoni, bandmates from Newport, RI, made an unexpected stop in Philadelphia on their way to Florida. After a week in the City of brotherly love, they decided to forgo Florida and help form Elizabeth. Some interesting guitarists auditioned for the band, including future rock star Todd Rundgren who was with Woody's Truck Stop at the time; and, Nick Jameson, soon to be a founder and guitarist of The American Dream (both were Philly bands). Within a month or so of landing in Philadelphia, Stewkey left Elizabeth to join Todd's new band, The Nazz. Of note, Linda Cohen, a Philadelphia classical guitarist, was Elizabeth's first drummer (briefly). During the spring and summer of 1969, she teamed up with Michael Kac from Mandrake Memorial and, together, performed as a classical-pop fusion guitar-harpsichord duo. Linda died in 2009 of lung cancer. Mandrake Memorial and Elizabeth shared the stage many times.

== Post-Elizabethan life ==
After Elizabeth disbanded in 1970, the band's members pursued various musical and non-musical endeavors. Hank went on to play with the group Good God. Steve began a recording/engineering career that kicked off at Vanguard and Electric Lady Studios. Bob moved to Florida and is quite active to this day as a Singer, Songwriter, Storyteller and Visual Artist. Linda Cohen recorded 3 albums (1971-1973) that were produced by Craig Anderton from Mandrake Memorial. Stewkey recorded 3 albums with The Nazz (1968-1971).

The Elizabeth album was re-mastered from the original tapes and re-released on CD in 2000 by the Akarma Vanguard label. The release comes housed in a mini album-styled sleeve that perfectly reproduces the original records foldout cover graphics. The popular Elizabeth track, "You Should Be More Careful", appears on the 2010 Vanguard album release (2-disk vinyl set) entitled "Follow Me Down: Vanguard's Lost Psychedelic Era (1966-1970)" along with tracks by The Vagrants, The 31st of February and other Vanguard artists.

== Band members ==
- Steve Weingarten - lead guitar, keyboards, backing vocals
- Bob Patterson - rhythm guitar (6 and 12-string), lead and backing vocals
- Jim Dahmne - flute, lead and backing vocals
- Steve Paul Bruno - bass guitar, Hammond B-3 organ, backing vocals
- Hank Ransome - drums, percussion

== Discography ==
=== Elizabeth ===
- LP = Vanguard Records VSD-6501, Stereo, 1968
- CD = Akarma Vanguard VMD-6501, Stereo, 2000, remastered from original tapes
- Produced by Sam Charters for Vanguard Records
- Songs Written by Weingarten (1, 3, 4, 6); Patterson (2, 5, 8, 10); Dahme (9); Weingarten & Dahme (7)

Side one
No.	Title	Length
1.	"Not That Kind Of A Guy"	3:08
2.	"Mary Anne"	2:42
3.	"Dissimilitude"	2:15
4.	"Similitude"	4:07
5.	"You Should Be More Careful"	4:07

Side two
No.	Title	Length
6.	"The World's For Free"	3:00
7.	"Fields Of Home"	3:15
8.	"Alarm Rings Five"	4:54
9.	"Lady L"	3:23
10.	"When All Else Fails"	4:18
