= Mandrake Memorial =

American rock band

- Origin: Philadelphia, Pennsylvania, United States
- Genres: Psychedelic rock, progressive rock
- Years active: 1967–1970
- Label: Poppy Records
- Past members: Craig Anderton; Michael Kac; J. Kevin Lally; Randy Monaco

Mandrake Memorial was an American psych/progressive rock band active between 1967 and 1970, known for their Baroque sound and unique songwriting.

== History ==
The Mandrake Memorial formed in late 1967 when producer/promoter Larry Schreiber was asked to put together a house band for Manny Rubin's downtown Philadelphia club, The Trauma. Schreiber started with Michael Kac (pronounced "Katz"), a folksinger/guitarist/banjoist/keyboardist who was already a regular performer at both The Trauma and Rubin's other club, The Second Fret. Kac had been in a band called The Candymen, later known as Cat's Cradle, recently broken up (Schreiber had been their manager). Guitarist Kim King (of Lothar and the Hand People, another Trauma Club regular) told Schreiber about a drummer he knew in a similar situation. J. (John) Kevin Lally was from a band called The Novae Police, a fixture at the Night Owl Club and The Bitter End in Greenwich Village, playing with bands like The Flying Machine (with James Taylor) and The Ragamuffins (from Canada). Schreiber visited Lally in the basement of New York's Albert Hotel, where Lally kept his drums in Lothar's practice room. Suitably impressed, he brought Lally back to Philadelphia to meet Michael, and the two musicians hit it off immediately. Kac then recruited a young guitarist he had seen, Craig Anderton from a University of Pennsylvania college band called The Flowers of Evil, who'd been opening for Todd Rundgren's first band Woody's Truck Stop. Last, Lally convinced his friend Randy Monaco, bassist/vocalist from The Novae Police, to relocate to Philly and join them. Although everyone was already working musicians, they jumped at the chance to be a house band, with a guaranteed gig every weekend and the chance to open for all the big-name bands brought in by Rubin.

The Mandrake Memorial quickly gelled and began developing a following. At the beginning they were a standard two-guitar, bass and drums quartet, but soon a sales representative from R.M.I. approached the group with a prototype of what was to become their Rock-Si-Chord (an electronic harpsichord). The band tried it out and quickly realized it gave them a new sound nobody else had. Since Kac was the only band member who could play keyboards, he switched from guitar to harpsichord and Mandrake was complete.

The new sound was an immediate success. Mandrake opened for The Doors, Big Brother and the Holding Company, Frank Zappa and The Mothers of Invention, Moby Grape, and Strawberry Alarm Clock, among others, and appeared on TV with Pink Floyd. Soon Mandrake was performing college circuit clubs like Boston Tea Party, Psychedelic Supermarket, Electric Circus, New York's Cafe Au Go Go, the Second Fret and The Main Point. Rubin got them signed to Poppy Records, the new experimental music label of MGM Records. Their first self-titled LP, produced by Tony Camillo and Tony Bongiovi (cousin of Jon Bon Jovi), sold over 100,000 copies, mainly in the Philadelphia, New York and Boston areas. A second LP, Medium was completed in early 1969 to similar high acclaim.

Kac (and his Rock-Si-Chord) left the band following Medium, citing musical differences, and in the summer of 1969 the remaining trio traveled to England to record a live-in-the-studio acoustic album with record producer Shel Talmy. Booked to tour the U.K. with Todd Rundgren's new band The Nazz, an English union disagreement prevented any American musicians from performing that summer. To top that off, their completed "Mandrake Unplugged" album was deemed too uncommercial by Poppy label executives and never released — although the idea was to become a huge trend two decades later. This 'lost' album was finally released on the Flashback label in 2016, titled 3 Part Inventions.

Returning to Philadelphia, the band began working on a new album, re-working some of the songs from their failed acoustic album. They were teamed up with New York producer Ronald Frangipane with the result that he brought in an orchestra and filled out the songs with full choir, children's choir, orchestral splashes and elaborate production. This album, Puzzle, fell into the progressive rock category, but did not sell well enough to make back its considerable production costs. It did garner critical praise, however. "The idea they have is very great," wrote classical conductor Seiji Ozawa in the May 23, 1970 edition of Billboard magazine. "I love this recording. With some recordings, I can listen to only one selection, but this recording I love to hear from the very beginning, from the first note to the last." Fusion, a major rock music publication at the time, added that it was "a symphony of the mind; one of the most important albums of the decade to come." The band recorded just one more single, a cover of Thunderclap Newman's "Something In The Air" backed with an original tune by Anderton. When the single also flopped, Lally left the band and Anderton and Monaco soon called it quits.

=== Post breakup activities ===
After disbanding Mandrake, Craig Anderton teamed up with Charles Cohen and Jefferson Cain to form an electronic trio called Anomaly. Their only recorded legacy is the musical backing and production credits on three LPs by Philadelphia acoustic guitarist (and guitar teacher) Linda Cohen (no relation to Charles), Leda (1971), Lake of Light (1972) and Angel Alley (1973). In the early 1980s, Charles Cohen and Jeff Cain went on to record and perform as The Ghostwriters (one LP, Objects In Mirrors Are Closer Than They Appear, 1981 and a cassette Remote Dreaming, (1986). Even during Mandrake, Anderton had invented several guitar effects pedals, synthesizer modules and a programmable electronic drum machine, projects which he documented in a long series of well-known DIY books for musicians beginning with "Electronic Projects for Musicians" (1975). He wrote extensively for several music industry publications including Synapse and Keyboard, and was the editor of Electronic Musician magazine from 1980 until 1990. His circuits appear in products from such manufacturers as TASCAM, Peavey Electronics, PAiA Electronics, Steinberg and Kurzweil Music Systems. He produced and guested on dozens of albums throughout the 1980s and 1990s. He released a solo album on cassette in 1977 and another (Forward Motion) on CD in 1989. He released Simplicity (with a Christian theme) and Neo-Psychedelic Music for the 21st Century both in 2017, and Joie de Vivre in November 2018. He remains active as a producer, engineer, musician and consultant.

During spring and summer of 1969, Michael Kac worked in a guitar/harpsichord duo with Linda Cohen. As classically trained musicians, both hoped to forge a new synthesis of popular and classical forms, which is evident in her albums. Already a graduate student in Linguistics, in 1971 Kac moved to Los Angeles to take his Ph.D at UCLA, then joined the faculty of the University of Minnesota in Minneapolis. He formally studied the harpsichord 1971-1983 and gives occasional solo and ensemble recitals. In 1998, he reunited with Linda Cohen and Craig Anderton to record Naked Under the Moon. Linda died in January 2009 of lung cancer.

Kevin Lally traveled to England in 1970, where his family originated, and ended up apprenticing at Lloyd's of London in ship insurance. Returning to New York in 1980, he founded Seahawk International, Inc. which became the largest privately held aviation and maritime insurance broker in New York. He was also the chairman on the restoration of Wavertree, the largest iron sailing vessel afloat. He still performs occasionally as a studio drummer, although he prefers to do it anonymously.

In 1974, Randy Monaco headed a short-lived Mandrake Memorial revival, in which he was the only original member. Lonnie Castille of Janis Joplin's Kozmic Blues band was the drummer. Sometime afterward he joined a version of the 1910 Fruitgum Company before succumbing to cirrhosis in 1983.

== Personnel ==
- Craig Anderton - Six- and 12-string guitars, sitar, Coral sitar, modulator
- Randy Monaco - Vocals, bass
- J. Kevin Lally - Drums, timpani
- Michael Kac - Guitar, Rock-Si-Chord, piano, vocals

== Discography ==
=== The Mandrake Memorial ===

- LP = Poppy Records PYS-40,002 Stereo, Fall 1968
- CD = Collectables Records COL-0691, 1996 (dubbed from vinyl)
- Produced by Tony Camillo and Anthony Bongiovi for Poppy Records
- Director of Engineering: Val Valentin
- Album design: Milton Glaser

All tracks are written by The Mandrake Memorial.

Side one
No.	Title	Length
1.	"Bird Journey"	2:40
2.	"Here I Am"	3:50
3.	"Rainy May"	3:45
4.	"This Can't Be Real"	3:45
5.	"Dark Lady"	4:14

Side two
No.	Title	Length
6.	"House of Mirrors"	2:28
7.	"To A Lonely"	3:50
8.	"Strange"	3:55
9.	"Next Number"	4:11
10.	"Sunday Noon"	7:08

=== Medium ===

- LP = Poppy Records PYS-40,003 Stereo, Spring 1969
- CD = Collectables Records COL-0692, 1996 (dubbed from vinyl)
- Produced by Tony Camillo and Anthony Bongiovi for Poppy Records
- Engineering: Anthony Bongiovi for Poppy Records
- Production Supervisor: Kevin Eggers
- Designed by Milton Glaser

All tracks are written by The Mandrake Memorial.

Side one
No.	Title	Length
1.	"Snake Charmer"	2:45
2.	"Witness The End / Celebration"	5:42
3.	"Other Side"	3:25
4.	"Last Number" (backing vocals: Michael Kac)	4:31

Side two
No.	Title	Length
5.	"After Pascal" (Flute, Louis Delgato)	6:51
6.	"Smokescreen"	5:06
7.	"Barnaby Plum" (immortalizes a skip at 1:09)	6:10
8.	"Cassandra"	5:26

=== Puzzle ===

- LP = Poppy Records PYS-40,006 Stereo, Fall 1969
- CD = Collectables Records COL-0693, 1996 (dubbed from vinyl)
- Produced by Ronald Frangipane
- Recorded at Century Sound Recording Studios, New York NY
- Engineered by Brooks Arthur
- Cover: M.C. Escher - House of Stairs (colorized on CD, black & white on LP) and Curl-up

All tracks are written by The Mandrake Memorial.

Side one
No.	Title	Length
1.	"Earthfriend Prelude" (immortalizes a skip at 2:08)	2:49
2.	"Earthfriend"	6:17
3.	"Just A Blur (version 1)"	0:53
4.	"Hiding"	3:15
5.	"Just A Blur (version 2)"	0:51
6.	"Tadpole"	2:25
7.	"Kyrie"	3:24
8.	"Ocean's Daughter"	3:35

Side two
No.	Title	Length
9.	"Volcano Prelude"	2:09
10.	"Volcano"	5:59
11.	"Whisper Play"	3:00
12.	"Bucket of Air"	9:37
13.	"Children's Prayer"	3:25
14.	"Puzzle"	3:08
15.	"Just A Blur (version 3)"	0:51

=== Single ===
- Single = Poppy Records 69,103, Winter 1969
- Re-released as bonus tracks on Puzzle CD

All tracks are written by Speedy Keen

Side one
No.	Title	Length
1.	"Something In The Air" (by Speedy Keen)	4:32

All tracks are written by Craig Anderton.

Side two
No.	Title	Length
2.	"Musical Man" (by Craig Anderton)	3:51

=== 3 Part Inventions ===
- CD = Flashback Records FLASHCD1008, 2016
- Engineered by Damon Lyon Shaw
- Recorded at I.B.C. Sound Recording Studios, London, July 1969
- Mastered for CD by Peter Reynolds/Reynolds Mastering from the original master tape, October 2016

All tracks are written by The Mandrake Memorial.

No.	Title	Length
1.	"The Puzzle"	2:52
2.	"Ocean's Daughter"	2:56
3.	"Tadpole"	2:32
4.	"Part Of My Dreams" (previously unreleased)	5:48
5.	"Wouldn't You Like It?" (previously released as a Craig Anderton cassette only)	2:14
6.	"Bucket of Air"	7:29
7.	"Witness The End" (longer version of song from 'Medium')	10:06
8.	"Cassandra" ('A'-side of unreleased 1969 acetate, same song as on 'Medium')	4:54
9.	"The 12th Brigade" ('B'-side of unreleased 1969 acetate, previously unreleased)	5:14
10.	""Rock Stars" Interview" ("Rock Stars" program (host Richard Robinson) radio interview, "sponsored by pHisoHex, the skin cleaner used by surgeons to fight off skin bacteria for hours after rinsing")	2:39
