= Cluster (novels) =

Novel series by Piers Anthony

First edition of series (publ. Avon Books) Cover artist: Ron Walotsky

Cluster is a series of science fiction novels by Piers Anthony. Anthony originally conceived of and wrote the series as a trilogy but later added two additional volumes. Although the central problem of each novel is unique, the books feature shared themes of cooperation, tolerance, open-mindedness, introspection, self-knowledge, and understanding. There is also a generous amount of alien sex/mating.

== Setting ==
As the series opens, humanity has colonized an area of the galaxy roughly 100 light years in diameter. This area is called Sphere Sol, as it is the sphere of influence of the race from the star Sol, that is, the Sun. Sphere Sol's "neighborhood" is also home to other spheres, each centered around a particular star: Spheres Polaris, Canopus, Spica, Nath, Mirzam, and Bellatrix as well as the huge, decadent Spheres Sador and Mintaka.

In the Cluster setting, races colonize other planets in three ways. The first is through instantaneous teleportation, called matter transmission or mattermission. This, however, is prohibitively expensive. Second, colonists travel to new worlds in "freezer" ships, where they are cryonically stored for the decades it takes for the voyage. Half of those frozen are lost due to failures either of the containment units or the ships themselves. The third and most common method of colonist travel is via lifeships, slower but safer multigenerational vessels that may take centuries to reach their destination. The drawback of the lifeships is that as they plod through space, their occupants regress in technical sophistication.

In part due to this, and perhaps because colony worlds with small populations cannot support sophisticated social constructs, all spheres in the Cluster series suffer spherical regression—i.e., the farther a colony is from its home star, the less technology the inhabitants use, while the social order begins to resemble periods of the home planet's past. For instance, the inhabitants of Outworld, Sphere Sol's farthest colony, are paleolithic tribes. They hunt with flint spears and make fire, but their society has little technology beyond that level.

Spherical regression does not create true copies of Earth or any world's past, however. Colonists know they are part of an interstellar empire, and they are aware of the technological and social differences on other planets. Furthermore, the home world mattermits some government and security personnel to all colony worlds. Therefore, individual students of history can often use their knowledge of the home world's past to make their own planets more or less primitive than one would expect when simply calculating the distance from the home star.

=== Kirlian transfer ===
The central plot mechanism of the Cluster novels is that of transfer. Every living thing has a Kirlian aura that can be measured. Through transfer, the mind and personality of individuals with high aura can be sent to animate a body physically distant. For instance, a transferee living on Earth could be sent to Outworld and inhabit the body of one of that planet's stone-age tribesmen.

Transfer is a refinement of mattermission technology, but because only the aura is transferred, it is substantially less expensive. In the first three novels, the protagonists find themselves transferring from alien body to alien body in order to combat threats from elsewhere in space.

=== Thousandstar and Viscous Circle ===
These later novels take place between Chaining the Lady and Kirlian Quest. While the original Cluster trilogy tells epic stories of galactic scope, the later two books are smaller stories in the same setting. Instead of transferring to different worlds with each chapter, the protagonists spend almost the full novel on a single planet. See further details below.

== Relationship with other novels ==
Anthony first conceived of the Cluster series when writing But What of Earth?, a speculative novel in which the government discovers the secret of mattermission, making interstellar colonization feasible. Earth? follows developments on humanity's home planet as its civilization and resources dwindle when half the population leaves for the colony worlds.

The Cluster series takes place roughly 500 years further in the future and is in continuity with Anthony's original manuscript of Earth?, published in an annotated edition by Tor Books in 1989. The Cluster series is not necessarily consistent with the first published version of Earth?, the heavily reworked 1976 Laser Books edition credited to Anthony and Robert Coulson as collaborators. According to Anthony this was an unauthorized collaboration. More detail can be found on Anthony's main page.

After completing the original Cluster trilogy, Anthony returned to the earlier time frame. His three-volume Tarot series featured Brother Paul of the Holy Order of Vision, a major supporting character in Earth?, and is set some years after that earlier novel. At the same time Anthony wrote the two additional Cluster novels, Thousandstar and Viscous Circle.

== Series synopsis ==
=== Cluster (1977) ===
As the story opens, the alien envoy Pnotl of Sphere Knyfh attempts to enlist the cooperation of Sphere Sol in a mutual crisis of galactic proportion: Galaxy Andromeda has discovered the secret of energy transfer and intends to use it to steal the basic energy of the Milky Way Galaxy. Knyfh proposes to give Sphere Sol the secret of transfer—the ability to transfer an individual's Kirlian aura (and thus his entire mind and personality) into another "host". In exchange for this priceless knowledge, Knyfh and other Spheres request that Sphere Sol spread the technology to its neighboring Spheres, creating a galactic coalition in which all minor spheres will patrol their own regions to find and weed out Andromedan agents.

Kirlian transfer, a technology known to the mysterious vanished culture known as The Ancients, is a millionth the effective cost of mattermission and has been sought for decades. This knowledge is proven by Pnotl himself, who pleads his case while hosted in a human body, and the government of Sol agrees to the plan.

Because a hosted aura fades at the rate of about 1 unit per Earth day, higher-Kirlian individuals last longer and thus have more freedom of movement. Sphere Sol's highest-Kirlian individual at the time is Flint, a green-skinned native of Outworld, Sphere Sol's most distant planet. Flint has a Kirlian aura of 200, an eidetic memory (useful for memorizing the complex equations of Kirlian transfer that he will need to communicate to other Spheres), extraordinary intelligence, and is highly adaptable. His mission is complicated, however, by the fact that he is pursued everywhere by a very high Kirlian female Andromedan agent—somehow the Andromedans are able to detect and trace Kirlian transfers.

Flint embarks upon several missions to bring transfer technology to neighboring Spheres, inhabiting various alien forms and learning much about alien sex, among other things. His efforts are successful despite a couple of false starts and the efforts of the Andromedan agent to prevent or kill him. In the process, the mutual attraction of their two vastly superior auras begin to create a conflict of loyalties. Upon discovery and investigation of an archaeological site of the Ancients in the Pleiades, Flint and a group of other non-Sol entities recover the information that will allow them also to detect and trace transfers, giving them parity with Andromeda. One of the group is revealed as the Andromedan agent and in an attempt to prevent her escape, the entire site is destroyed.

Flint and his nemesis are, through the mechanism of the Ancient site, transferred into Mintakan bodies. Choosing to leave things as they are, with parity between their two galaxies, Flint and the Andromedan mate and remain together until their auras fade (which happens rapidly since their physical bodies have been destroyed).

=== Chaining the Lady (1978) ===
The book opens with the discovery that Andromeda, the enemy galaxy of the first novel, has discovered the secret of involuntary hosting: a sufficiently higher-Kirlian aura can in effect possess an individual of a lower-Kirlian aura. This has enabled Andromeda to secretly infiltrate the highest levels of government in Sphere Sol and its allies and resurrect its plot to steal the energy of the Milky Way.

Melody of Mintaka, a direct descendant of Flint of Outworld and his Andromedan nemesis, has a Kirlian aura of well over 200. She is pressed into service to "possess" and interrogate a captured Andromedan transferee. Melody, hosted in the young and beautiful body of Yael of Dragon, must like her ancestor Flint find a way to defeat the Andromedan threat and save the galaxy.

The mysterious Ancients are present again in the form of their artifacts and sites. The themes of Tarot and of various myths of Sphere Sol (in this case that of Perseus and Andromeda) are carried throughout this novel as well—for example, the interSphere fleet of starships has forms analogous to the Tarot suits of Disks, Cups, Wands and Swords.

=== Kirlian Quest (1978) ===
For a thousand years Sphere / of Andromeda was cursed by the other spheres because a representative, Llume of /, betrayed Andromeda during the Second War of Energy. As Kirlian Quest opens, a new threat has appeared on the horizon: the Space Amoeba, a fleet of alien ships one million strong, whose intentions are definitely hostile. Herald the Healer, aural (but not literal) descendant of Flint and Melody, who is a / of Andromeda, has the chance to redeem his species' honor and save the galaxy, but in order to do so he must solve the riddle of the Space Amoeba and of the Ancients themselves.

=== Thousandstar (1980) ===
The story takes place before Chaining the Lady, hence the mystery of the Ancients is still unsolved. A new Ancient Site has been discovered, and unlike others which are "dead" this one appears to be active and functioning. To determine which Sphere has the right to explore it and investigate its secrets, a competition is being held. Each competing team consists of a carefully matched host and transferee pair, chosen for their complementary skills and knowledge. The tasks test all of the competitors' abilities to their limit and range from word puzzles to navigating past a black hole. However, both Heem of Highfalls and his transferee Jessica of Capella have deep dark secrets that may cost them not just the competition but their lives.

=== Viscous Circle (1982) ===
Like Thousandstar, this story takes place before Chaining the Lady, when the nature of the Ancients is still a mystery. Viscous Circle is set on the planet of the Bands, a strange race of beings who are the ultimate pacifists -- they take the form of magnetic disks that float through space and simply demagnetize and self-destruct when faced with an unpleasant thought. When Solarisns arrive and attempt to wipe out the entire population, one Band has to figure out how to stop them.
