= The Architects of Hyperspace =

1987 science fiction novel by Thomas R. McDonough

- First edition cover Art by Ron Walotsky
- Author: Thomas R. McDonough
- Genre: Science fiction
- Publisher: Avon Books
- Publication date: December 1, 1987

The Architects of Hyperspace is a science fiction novel by American writer Thomas R. McDonough, published by Avon Books in 1987.

== Plot summary ==
In the novel, oceanographer Ariadne Zepos tries to discover the origin and purpose of a tremendous labyrinth alien structure.

== Reception ==
J. Michael Caparula reviewed The Architects of Hyperspace in Space Gamer/Fantasy Gamer No. 84. Caparula commented that "While I find the concept of benign trans-galactic intelligences somewhat overused, McDonough's scientific imagination lends credibility to the story, making for a satisfying read."

== Reviews ==
- Review by Dan Chow (1987) in Locus, #321 October 1987
- Review by Don D'Ammassa (1988) in Science Fiction Chronicle, #101 February 1988
- Review by Tom Easton (1988) in Analog Science Fiction/Science Fact, May 1988
- Kliatt
