= John Simonton =

John Stayton Simonton Jr. (June 24, 1943 – November 25, 2005) was a circuit designer, author of electronics articles, and founder of PAiA Electronics, a manufacturer of analog synthesizer kits. He lived in Arcadia, Oklahoma.

Simonton was born in Honolulu and grew up in New Orleans. In 1965 he graduated from Louisiana Tech University with degrees in electrical engineering and psychology. In 1967 he began working on the first computerized jet engine test facility in Oklahoma at the Tinker Air Force Base. He then founded PAiA Electronics as a mail order electronics kit company. Simonton began publishing Polyphony magazine in 1975, which later became Electronic Musician.

Simonton was diagnosed with esophageal cancer in 2004 and died in 2005 at his home in Arcadia, Oklahoma
