= Thousandstar =

Novel by Piers Anthony

First edition (publ. Avon Books) Cover artist: Ron Walotsky

Thousandstar is a novel by Piers Anthony published in 1980 in which the main character is an alien creature in the form of a blob.

== Reception ==
Dave Langford reviewed Thousandstar for White Dwarf #58, and stated that "pleasant space-opera though a bit long and a bit prone to tell you the moral of each event on the assumption that you're too thick to see it yourself."

== Reviews ==
- Review by Ian Williams (1980) in Paperback Inferno, Volume 4, Number 1
- Review by Steve Lewis (1981) in Science Fiction Review, Spring 1981
- Review by Tom Easton (1981) in Analog Science Fiction/Science Fact, March 30, 1981
- Review by Christopher Ogden (1985) in Paperback Inferno, #57
