= The Tridels =

The Tridels are a Philadelphia, Pennsylvania-based vocal trio, originally consisting of Marc Snader, Larry Chassen, and Mike Bove’. Mike Bove', Cheryl Petruzelli and Paul Jerome are the current members doing a tribute to the music of the 1960s and 1970s.

Marc, Larry and Mike 1964

The group was formed in 1962 when the trio were 18 years of age. Their first recordings "Land of Love" and "The Image of My Love" were produced and written in 1964 by future radio and TV star Gene Arnold, under the name of Rick Roman, and recorded at San-Dee Worldwide Limited Records in Philadelphia at the 212 N 12th St. studios. The group recorded over 35 original compositions during their nine-year career, and wrote and recorded for commercials and two documentary films in the 1960s.

== Career ==
Mike Bove’ and Marc Snader began creating the group while attending their senior year at high school. A year later, they added Larry Chassen and the group began to rehearse and polish their vocal harmonies in 1963 with appearances at universities and at dances and parties throughout the Philadelphia area. It is at one of these performances that The Tridels were approached by two young record producers from the new Philadelphia recording label, San-Dee Worldwide Limited Records. Rick Roman, who became The Tridels’ personal manager, and Alan Lee were developing a small, but unique pool of talented Philadelphia performers for the label including The Good Guys, with Artie Ross, and The Stylettes.

With the release of their first single, “Land of Love” in August 1964, The Tridels began a whirlwind touring schedule of record hops, interviews, radio shows and appearances in the Philadelphia, New Jersey and Delaware tri-state area. Cash Box Magazine (August 15, 1964) liked both sides of the release rating “Land of Love” with a B+ calling it, “an inviting lindy with old R&R sound”, and the flipside, “Image of My Love”, a B, calling it an “uptempo ditty”. As Robert Bosco stated in his December 2011 article about The Tridels for Echoes of the Past magazine,“ a B+ rating for an untested new act was nothing short of sensational”. Philadelphia area radio stations began playing “Land of Love” exclusively and The Tridels were appearing at Philadelphia’s AM giant, WIBG’s record hops throughout New Jersey and Pennsylvania three to four times a week for popular WIBBAGE deejays, Hy Lit, Joe Niagara, Jerry Stevens, Larry Justice, and Don L. Brink. On the August 24, 1964 issue of the WIBG "Top 99 Survey", The Tridels and “Land of Love” were listed as the WIBBAGE Sureshot of the Week. Bosco added “superstation WIBG, the AM giant in the area, juiced the cause by having stalwart jocks …pound their rising WIBBAGE Sureshot day after night”. When the record broke in the Midwest, the group joined the "Caravan of Stars" tour in the summer of 1964 and toured five states and Canada promoting the release. The Beatles explosion in 1964 dampened prospects for most American releases that year, but the Tridels continued to perform until 1966, when Larry joined the Coast Guard. Helene Jarvis (Goldberg) joined the Tridels in 1966 and they continued to entertain in clubs and events throughout the tri-state area for five more years concentrating on recording original material.

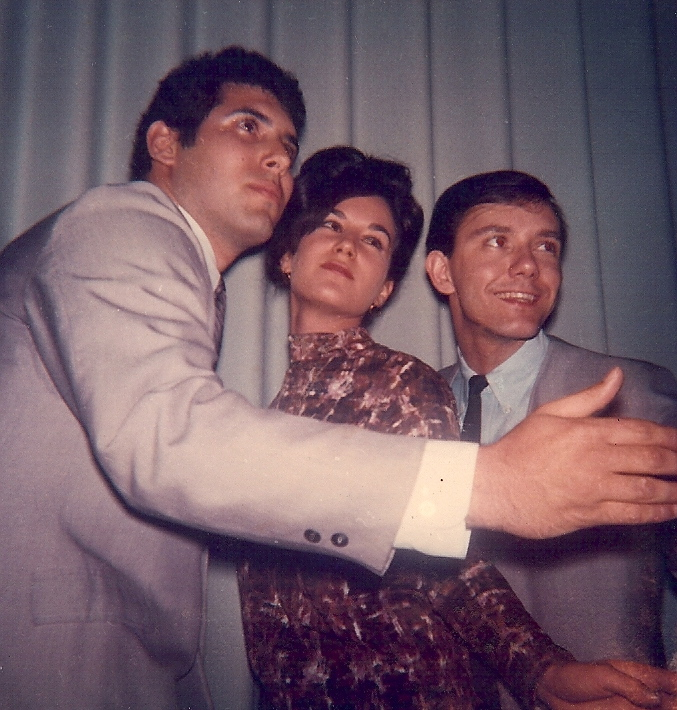
The Tridels’ Marc, Helene and Mike 1966

The Tridels humorously recorded a jingle for the Quickie Mop Company, the distributors of replaceable mop heads as a lark. The company loved it and Philadelphia WCAU radio and television personality Bill Hart was hired to record the commercial spot with them. The Tridels also wrote and recorded a musical commercial for the Atlantic City Race Course titled "Love in the Afternoon."

In 1970, Emmy award-winning documentary filmmaker Martin Spinelli asked the group to write a song for a film he was finishing on Eagleville Hospital caring for patients with alcohol and substance abuse. The song "No Man Is So Lost" was featured in the film Eagleville: You’re Not Alone. A vocal and instrumental track was created for another documentary on Philadelphia International Airport titled Portrait of An Airport.

The Tridels disbanded in 1971. Today, "Land of Love" and "Image of My Love" are featured in several compilation albums and CDs being sold on the internet by British and German companies. The song became a cult classic in northern England and in Germany and several European sites on the internet feature The Tridels.

In 2010, the original members re-united for the first time in 47 years. As a tribute to the group’s musical legacy, a double CD, Back to Life, an anthology of the Tridels’ music and memories, was released in August 2011, the 47th anniversary of the release of "Land of Love." All proceeds from the sale of the CD have been donated to Pennies in Action, in support of cancer research. The Tridels were featured in a six-page article in the December 2011 issue of Echoes of the Past magazine which is published in Massachusetts.

In 2012, the original trio was asked to perform at their 50th high school reunion and entertained their classmates in person for the first time in fifty years. Several new songs were released in 2012 and 2013 by the current version of The Tridels. Jackie Strauss and Art Wilson joined The Tridels and performed with original Mike Bove' in 2014. Jackie remained with the group with new Tridel Paul Jerome until 2017.

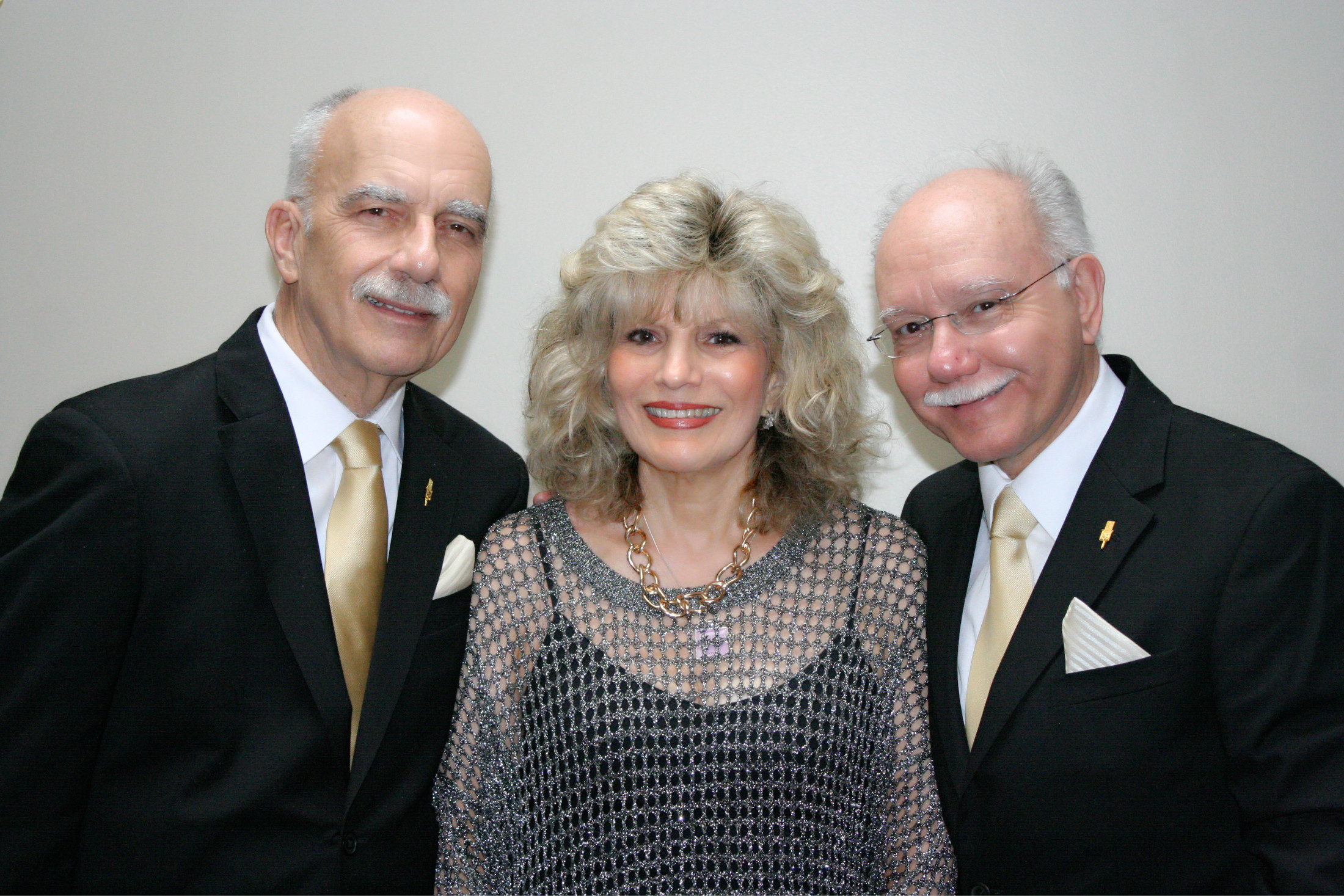
Art, Jackie and Mike

From 2017-2020, original Tridel Mike Bove', Cheryl Petruzelli and Paul Jerome performed their show "Classic Hits of the '60s & '70s". Today, original Tridel Mike Bove' performs the hits of the Teen Idols and the songs you grew up with AND fell in love with! For more info and booking availability contact The Tridels on Facebook!

The Tridels' Paul, Cheryl and Mike 2020

In 2016, the entire Tridels Family mourned the loss of original member, much beloved Larry Chassen.

== Discography ==
- 1964: Land of Love, Image of My Love
- 1965: I'am Coming Back To Your Heart, For Your Love, Teardrops, I Feel Fine
- 1966: A Kind of Beauty, Forbidden Fruit, Softly As I Leave You
- 1967: Thank You Friend, Autumn Wind, Nancy
- 1968: Sheriff Man, Poor Little Girl, Light My Fire
- 1969: Never Meant To Be, A Stranger To Me, Accept The Facts, What Is Love
- 1970: Time, The Costume Ball, All You Can Do Is Smile, No Man Is So Lost, This House, Love In The Afternoon
- 1971: Let’s Go Dancing, Let's Put it All Together
- 2011: Back To Life, An Anthology
- 2012: 50 Years, A Tale of Red, White & Blue
- 2013: Where Were You, Forever and Always, Diana

== See also ==
- Gene Arnold
