= Homo rodans =

1959 surrealist sculpture

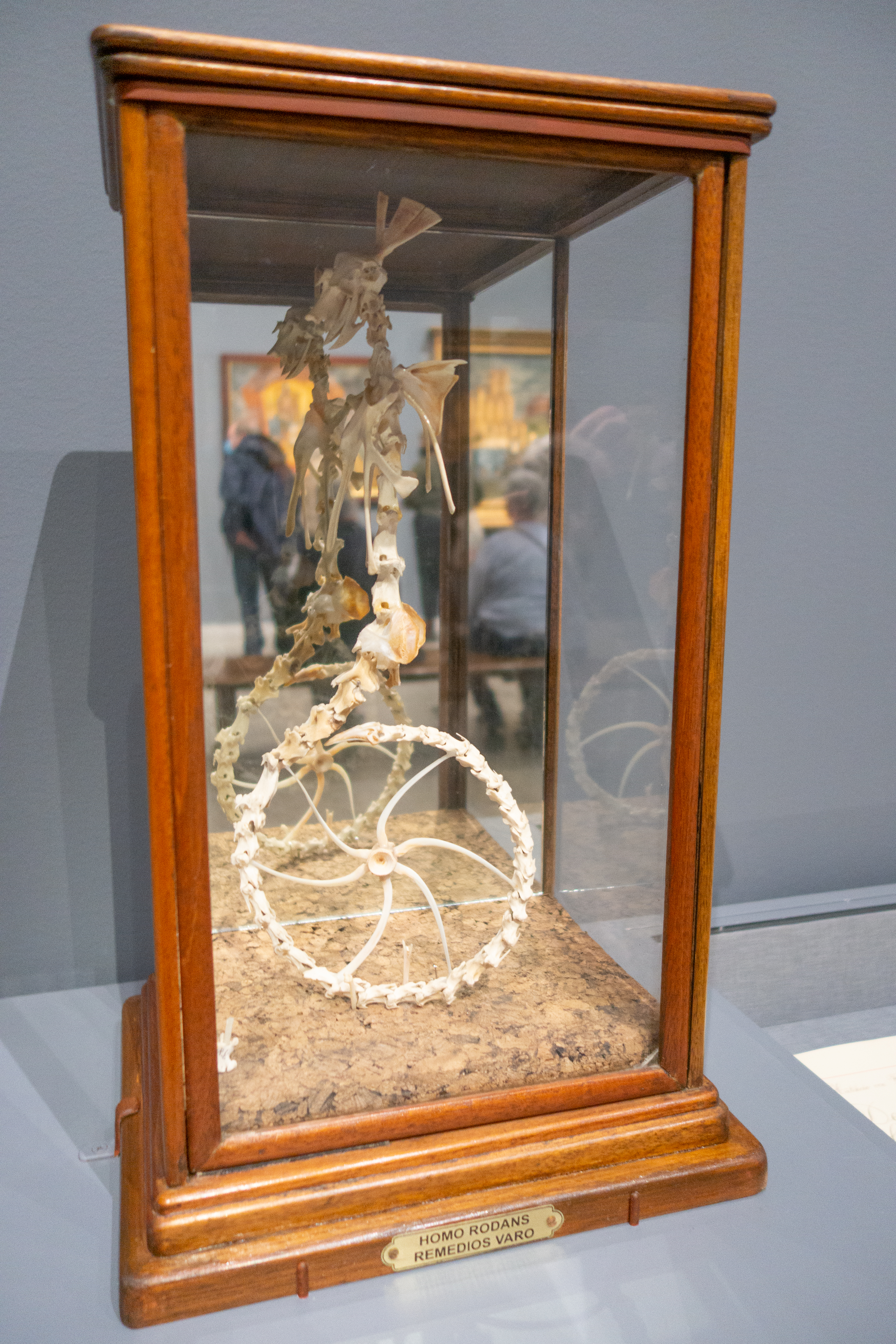
- Artist: Remedios Varo
- Year: 1959
- Catalogue: CR no. 269
- Medium: Animal bones
- Movement: Surrealism
- Dimensions: 40.9 cm × 16.8 cm × 6.4 cm (16.1 in × 6.6 in × 2.5 in)
- Location: Private collection

Homo rodans is a 1959 sculpture by the Spanish-Mexican surrealist Remedios Varo, constructed of discarded animal bones. The sculpture is a representation of a fantastical precursor to Homo sapiens, with a wheel instead of legs.

Alongside the sculpture, Varo wrote a satirical anthropological report entitled De Homo rodans with gouache illustrations of the creature.

== History ==
At the time of the making of Homo rodans in the 1950s, Varo was already a successful painter. In 1955 she had an exhibition in the Diana Gallery in Mexico City, and it was well-received.

Homo rodans is Varo's only sculpture. She initially displayed the piece, with the manuscript, in the Juan Martín bookshop in Mexico City. (Note: The bookshop was at the back of the Sala Margolín music store, which was owned by Varo's lover Walter Gruen.) Shortly thereafter, Carmen Toscano de Moreno Sánchez and Manuel Moreno Sánchez purchased the sculpture and manuscript.

== Description ==
Homo rodans is an imagined creature with a spine curving into a circle, forming a wheel where the legs of a human would be. The hypothetical mechanics of the wheel are unclear. Six thin bones form the spokes of the wheel, connecting to a small central bone. Wing-like appendages are attached in place of arms. Atop the head is a bone which sprouts upward, resembling a headdress.

Varo constructed the sculpture out of small chicken, turkey, rabbit, and fish bones discarded from cooking. The bones are connected with clear glue. The sculpture is displayed in a glass case with a wooden frame.

== Accompanying manuscript ==
Varo wrote a satirical scholarly manuscript the same year she made the sculpture (which piece came first is unknown), which provides a fictional account of the "discovery" of this "artifact". In the manuscript, attributed to a fictitious anthropologist named Hälikcio von Fuhrängschmidt, (Note: According to Margaret Carson, the name "Hälikcio von Fuhrängschmidt" is a nod to Varo's birth names "Alicia" and "Uranga".) Varo divides the universe in two periods: the "First Attitude" which seeks hardness, and the "Second Attitude" which seeks softness. She also responds to and discusses the work of a fabricated anthropologist, W. H. Strudlees. She cites a fictional collection of Persian poetry from 2300 BC, known as the Cadenced Multimyrtle, which supposedly described Homo rodans. Giovanna Minardi notes that she takes to extremes the technique of Jorge Luis Borges of falsifying data, authorities, and authors in his fiction.

The manuscript parodies the style of anthropological treatises and scientific works, including fake Latin that Varo herself did not understand. The manuscript tells, among other things, of an archaeological find of a walking stick that felt frustrated due to not being used anymore, and thus got itself some pterodactyl wings and became an umbrella. Minardi highlights that this umbrella, in the context of chests with clay tablets, is in the surrealist tradition of placing things out of their typical context, as in Lautréamont's "the chance meeting on a dissecting-table of a sewing-machine and an umbrella".

Francisco Rabasso Rodrigues notes as significant influence for the manuscript that of Hildegard of Bingen, due to her esoteric practices, and her relation to time as circular or simultaneous.

== Analysis ==
Fifteen of Varo's works between 1943 and 1962, including this one, feature wheel motifs. Laura Balikci analyzes the recurring wheels as symbolizing liberating potential (as in bicycles and other vehicles) as well as holding spiritual significance as a symbol of perpetuity.

Giovanna Minardi notes that the wheel and the idea of travel are the most frequent metaphors in Varo's work. Varo is quoted as saying regarding a painting that "travelers represent people who try to get to a higher spiritual level", and Minardi notes the artist was a traveler, not only physically but mentally.

Homo rodans and its accompanying manuscript, according to Minardi, demonstrate Varo's adherence to the Surrealist maxim "a maximum of precision in order to get a maximum of madness". (Note: Spanish: un máximo de precisión para el máximo de desvarío)

Francisco Rabasso Rodrigues notes that the sculpture is "more anthropological than artistic", and can help viewers imagine subjectivities that are "hybrid and deterritorialized" like those Nestor Garcia Canclini studied in Latin America. Rabasso Rodriguez also notes the relation of Homo rodans not only to Che Guevara's "New Man", but also to Wifredo Lam's Paintings, as well as to Homo Ludens, Homo faber, Homo ridens, Homo videns, and Homo interneticus.

== See also ==
- Rolling and wheeled creatures in fiction and legend
- Rotating locomotion in living systems
