= PAiA Electronics =

US music synthesizer company

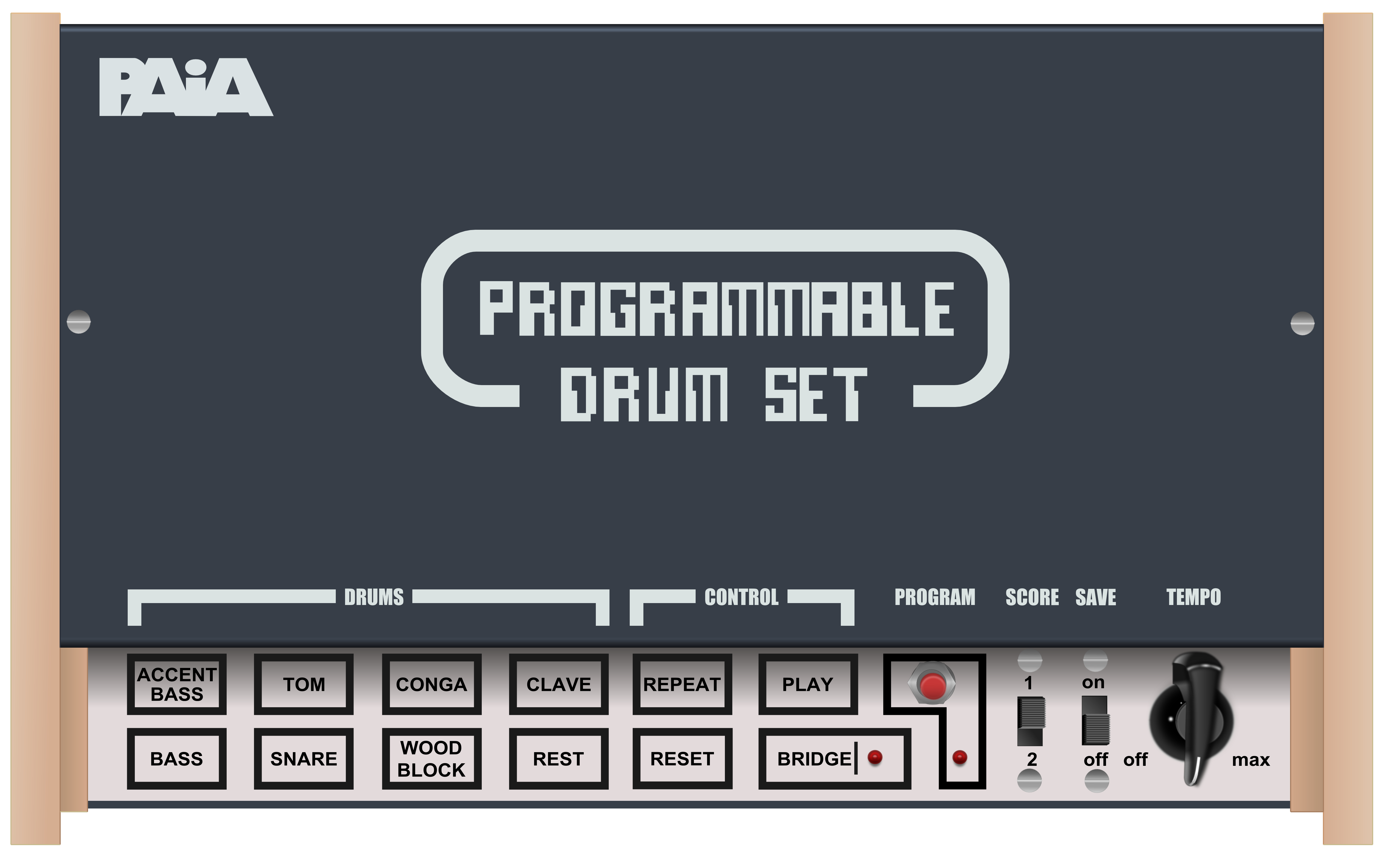
- PAiA Programmable Drum Set (1975), one of the earliest programmable drum machines.
- Founded: 1967
- Founder: John Simonton
- Headquarters: US
- Products: Synthesizer
- Website: paia.com

PAiA Electronics, Inc. is an American synthesizer kit company that was started by John Simonton in 1967. It sells various musical electronics kits including analog synthesizers, theremins, mixers and various music production units designed by founder John Simonton, Craig Anderton, Marvin Jones, Steve Wood and others.

== History ==
Simonton founded the company in Oklahoma City in 1967 and began offering various small electronics kits through mail order. The first kit was a circuit board for the "Cyclops Intrusion Detector" for an article in the May 1968 issue of Popular Electronics. Starting in 1972 PAiA began producing analog synthesizer kits, in both modular and all-in-one form. PAiA began publishing Polyphony Magazine in June 1975. It was later renamed to Electronic Musician and sold to Mix Publications in 1985. Founder Simonton continued to run the company in Oklahoma until his death in November 2005. Product marketing, sales and development were transferred to Paia Corporation in Fall 2006. The company now operates facilities in Austin, Texas and Edmond, Oklahoma.

== Synthesizers ==
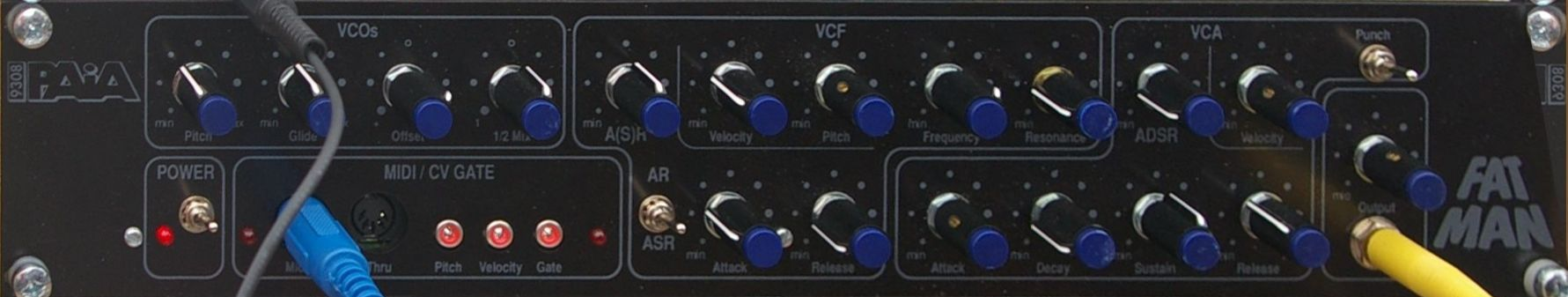
PAiA FatMan Analog MIDI Synth (1990s)

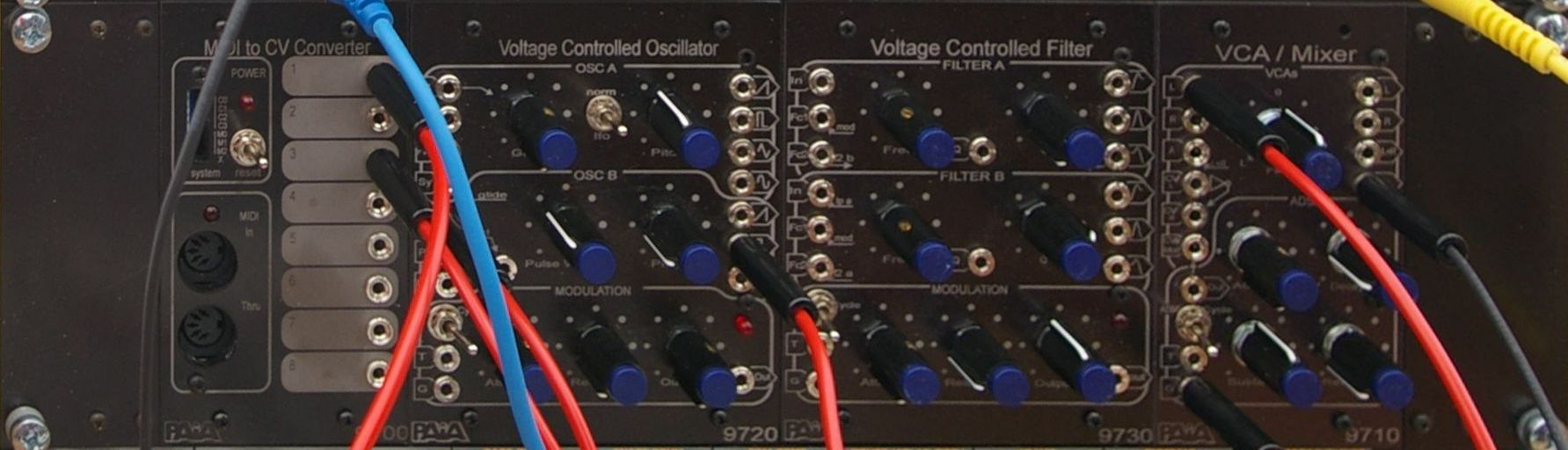
PAiA P9700S Modular Synthesizer (2000s (decade))

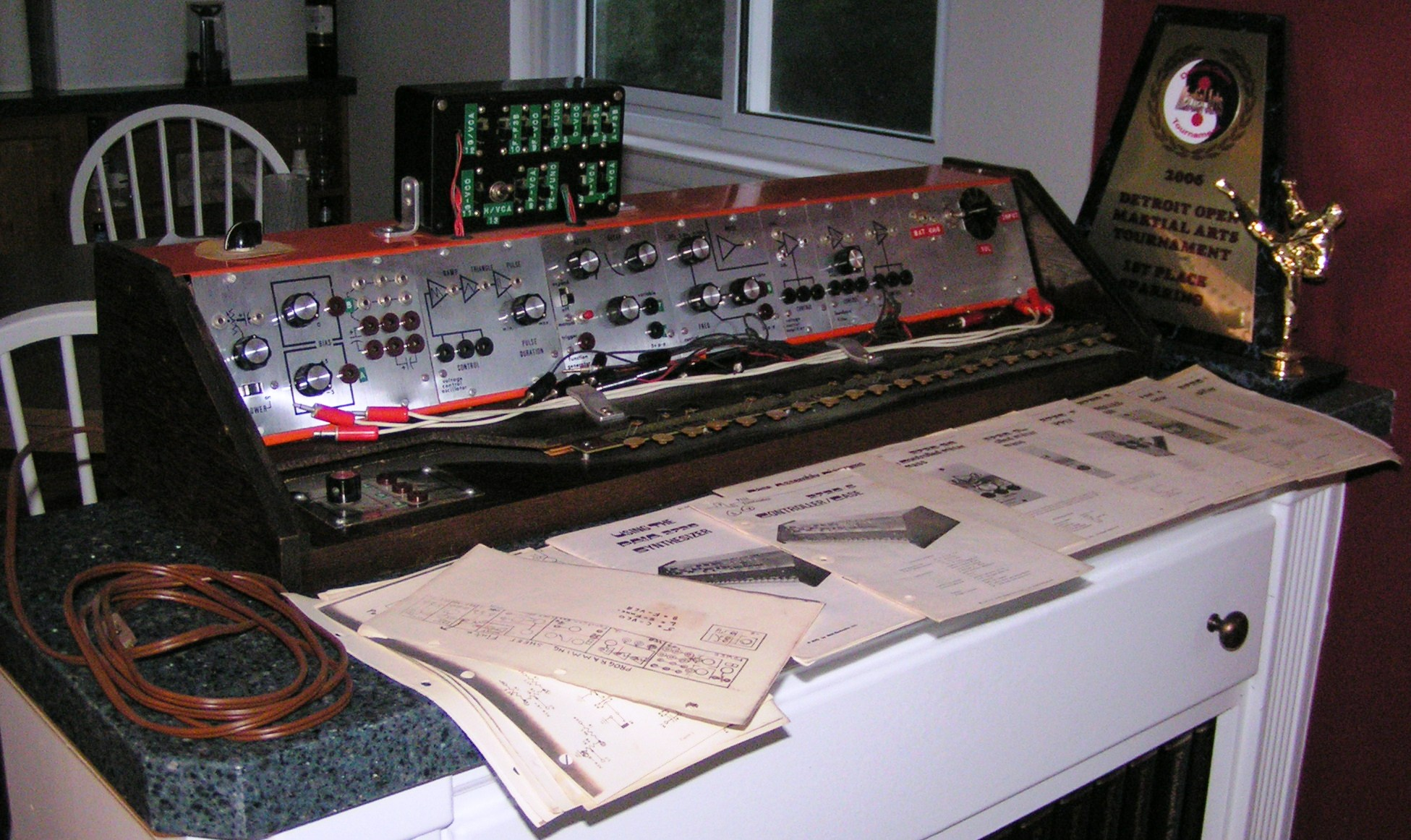
PAIA 2700 modified with a patch panel, amp. & battery. (photo 7/2010 when donated to the Stearns Musical Instrument Collection)

In 1972, PAiA released the 2720 modular synthesizer series, which used shirt-buttons attached to wires in lieu of a keyboard. A version with a keyboard, the 2720, was later released. The next modular series, the 4700s, featured an improved, quieter design. The P4700J series was computer controlled (using a MOS 6503 processor) that allowed polyphony for the first time on a PAiA modular synthesizer. As interest in modular synthesizers died down, PAiA stopped selling modular kits in the late 1980s and 1990s. In the early 2000s (decade), they launched the 9700 modular synthesizer line.

In 1974, PAiA released the $48.95 3740 Gnome, a small, simple, with a resistive vinyl strip, as a keyboard-less synthesizer, designed for creating non-harmonic sound effects, able to run on two nine volt batteries (+9 and +18 volts). The next year they released the first programmable drum machine called the Programmable Drum Set. Later they released the Oz, another small synthesizer, this time with an 18-key keyboard. In the 1990s PAiA released the FatMan Analog MIDI Synth, a MIDI capable, monophonic, analog synthesizer.

== Influence ==
For a time, the image of the audio synthesizer was that of an enormous modular system, which could take up entire walls of studios and were only available to the few musicians that could afford them (such as Keith Emerson and Wendy Carlos). PAiA's modular synthesizers, with prices starting under $1,000, were groundbreaking in their affordability and ease of use. At a time when synthesizers from Moog Music and ARP could cost anywhere from $5,000 to $10,000, PAiA's most basic modular system, the 2700, started at $230, with prices for modules ranging from $50 to $800.

Simonton and Anderton's designs also anticipated many trends in modern electronics and electronic music; they released the first programmable electronic drum machine, the PAiA Programmable Drum Set, in 1975, as well as one of the first computer-controlled synthesizers, the P4700J, which used digital technology and computer connectivity to achieve polyphony and other groundbreaking features.

The P4700J used a PAIA 8700 MOS 6503 processor based controller. Larry Fast used this same controller running John Simonton's "Pink Tunes" program on his Album "Computer Experiments, Volume One".

== Craig Anderton ==
Craig Anderton, a member of the psych/progressive rock band Mandrake Memorial, wrote Electronic Projects for Musicians, Home Recording for Musicians, Guitar Gadgets, The Digital Delay Handbook, MIDI for Musicians, and The Electronic Musician's Dictionary. He has written articles for AOL, Harmony Central, Guitar Player, Byte, Rolling Stone, Musician, Popular Electronics, A/V Video, and Mix, Keyboard, Pro Sound News, Performing Songwriter, Sound on Sound and EQ.
