= Metcalf Center for Science and Engineering =

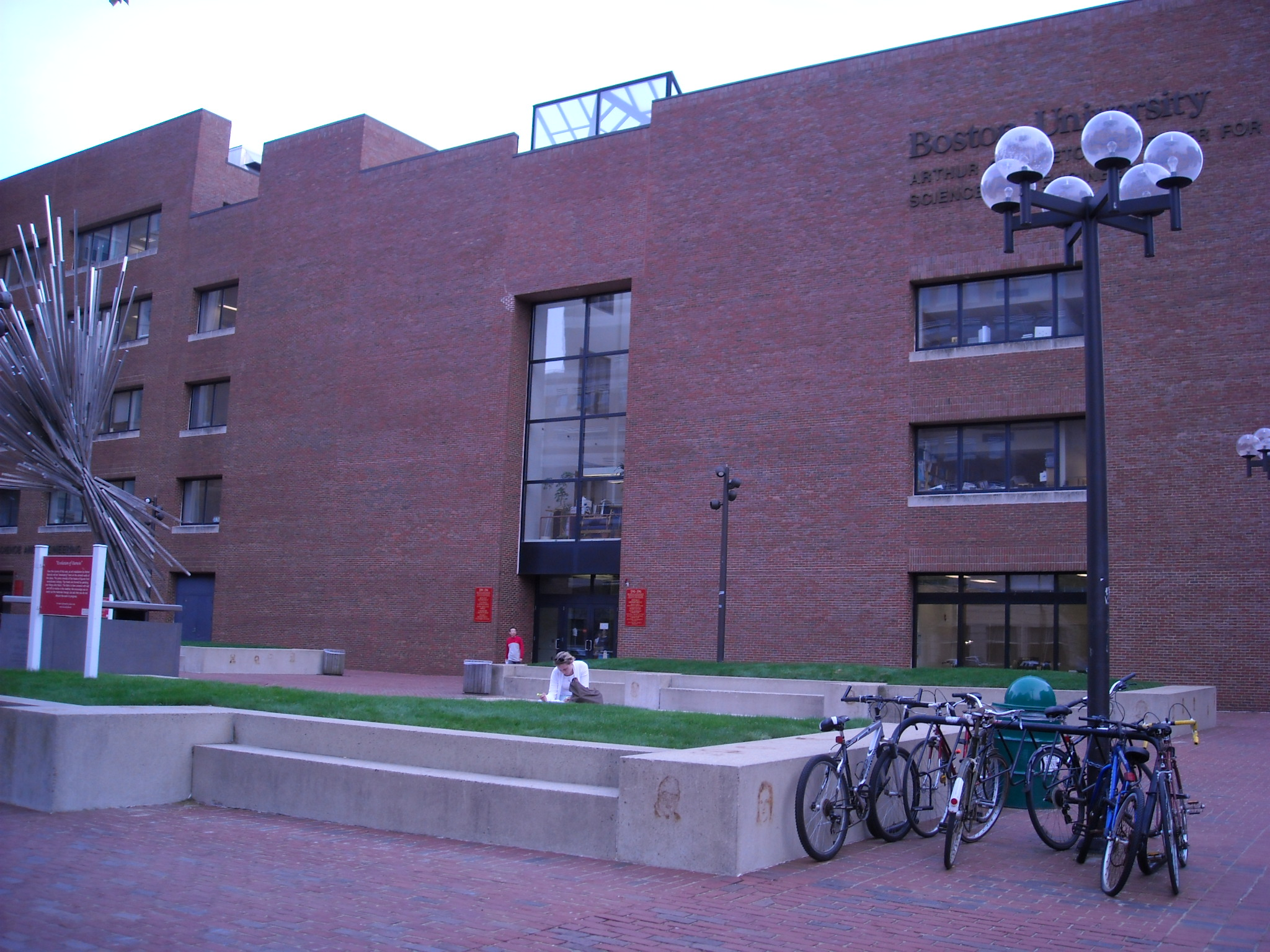
- The entrance of Metcalf, with the sculpture out front.

General information
- Type: Classroom Building
- Location: Boston, Massachusetts
- Address: 590-596 Commonwealth Avenue
- Coordinates: 42°20′54.5″N 71°6′0.65″W
- Opened: 1983
- Owner: Boston University

Metcalf Center for Science and Engineering (SCI) is a building owned by Boston University named for Arthur G.B. Metcalf. Metcalf founded what would later become the university's College of Engineering and served as its chair. He also donated millions of dollars toward the construction of the building. SCI contains offices, classrooms, and laboratories primarily used by the Physics, Chemistry, and Biology Departments of the College of Arts and Sciences. Its facilities are also used for biomedical research. Boston University boasts that there is a waiting list for researchers wanting to conduct research in the building.

The edifice was constructed out of three existing industrial buildings in 1983 when John Silber was Boston University's president. The building's modern atrium was originally a spacing between two of the original buildings. The building underwent a $25 million replacement of its ventilation system in 2008, resulting in a two-story HVAC unit being installed on the building's roof. The original unit installed in 1983 was inadequate for the size of the building, particularly in dealing with the moisture of ambient air on hot summer days. The atrium of the building has large green pipes running the height of the building which connect to the HVAC. The exposed nature of these pipes recalls the architectural movement of utilitarian structural expressionism akin to Centre Georges Pompidou in Paris.

Previously, in the place of the building, at the same address, had been a converted parking garage, the basement of which had been a music venue known as the Psychedelic Supermarket. The venue had had such bands as Cream (1967), the Grateful Dead (1967), Janis Joplin (1968), and the Moody Blues (1968).
