= Curl-up =

1951 lithograph by M. C. Escher

- Artist: M. C. Escher
- Year: 1951
- Type: lithograph
- Dimensions: 17 cm × 23.2 cm (6.7 in × 9.1 in)

Curl-up or Wentelteefje (original Dutch title) is a lithograph print by M. C. Escher, first printed in November 1951.

This is the only work by Escher consisting largely of text. The text, which is written in Dutch, describes an imaginary species called Pedalternorotandomovens centroculatus articulosus, also known as “wentelteefje” or “rolpens”. He says this creature came into existence because of "the absence, in nature, of wheel shaped, living creatures with the ability to roll themselves forward".

The creature is elongated and armored with several keratinized joints. It has six legs, each with what appears to be a human foot. It has a disc-shaped head with a parrot-like beak and eyes on stalks on either side.

It can either crawl over a variety of terrain with its six legs or press its beak to the ground and roll into a wheel shape. It can then roll, gaining acceleration by pushing with its legs. On slopes it can tuck its legs in and roll freely. This rolling can end in one of two ways; by abruptly unrolling in motion, which leaves the creature belly-up, or by braking to a stop with its legs and slowly unrolling backwards.

There is a diagonal gap through the text containing an illustration showing the step by step process of the creature rolling into a wheel. This creature appears in two more prints completed later the same month, House of Stairs and House of Stairs II.

== Inspiration and development ==
In a 1968 interview with the journalist Bibeb for Vrij Nederland, Escher explained his inspiration for the rolling four-legged creature: "I got that idea when I was on my bike. I thought, how idiotic, now I'm rolling on wheels over the ground; that's much easier than on foot, that cutting. God forgot to make that wheel, that was stupid, so I just have to do it myself.'"

The word wentelteefje is Dutch for French toast, wentel meaning "to turn over". Rolpens is a dish made with chopped meat wrapped in a roll and then fried or baked. Een pens means "belly", often used in the phrase beer-belly.

== Translation ==
The translation of the surrounding text is as follows:

The Pedalternorotandomovens Centroculatus Articulosus (curl-up) came into existence (spontaneous generation), because of the absence, in nature, of wheel shaped, living creatures with the ability to roll themselves forward. The accompanying 'beastie' depiction, referred to as 'revolving bitch' or 'roll paunch' in laymen's terms, subsequently anticipates the need with sensitivity. Biological details are still few: is it a mammal, a reptile, or an insect? It has a long, drawn-out, horned, sectioned body and three sets of legs; the ends of which look like the human foot. In the middle of the fat, round head, that is provided with a strong, bent parrot's beak; they have bulb-shaped eyes, which, placed on posts, protrude far out from both sides of the head. In the stretched out position, the animal can, slowly and cautiously, with the use of his six legs, move forward over a variety of terrains (it can potentially climb or descend steep stairs, plow through bushes, or scramble over boulders). However, when it must cover a great distance, and has a relatively flat path to his disposal, he pushes his head to the ground and rolls himself up with lightning speed, at which time he pushes himself off with his legs - for as much as they can still touch the ground. In the rolled up state it exhibits the form of a discus, of which the eye posts are the central axle. By pushing off alternately with one of his three pairs of legs, he can achieve great speeds. It is also sometimes desirable during the rolling (i.e. The descent of an incline, or coasting to a finish) to hold up the legs and 'freewheel' forward. Whenever it wants, it can return again to the walking position in two ways: first abruptly, by suddenly extending his body, but then it's lying on his back with his legs in the air, and second through gradual deceleration (braking with his feet) and slowly unrolling backwards in standing position.

The original Dutch text on the litho is:

De Pedalternorotandomovens centroculatus articulosus ontstond, (generatio sponanea!) uit onbevredigdheid over het in de natuur ontbreken van wielvormige, levende schepselen met het vermogen zich rollend voort te bewegen. Het hierbij afgebeelde diertje, in de volksmond genaamd "wentelteefje" of "rolpens", tracht dus in een diepgevoelde behoefte te voorzien. Biologische bijzonderheden zijn nog schaars: is het een zoogdier, een reptiel, of een insekt? Het heeft een langgerekt, uit verhoornde geledingen gevormd lichaam en drie paren poten, waarvan de uiteinden gelijkenis vertonen met de menselijke voet. In het midden van de dikke, ronde kop, die voorzien is van een sterk gebogen papagaaiensnavel, bevinden zich de bolvormige ogen, die, op stelen geplaatst, ter weerszijden van de kop ver uitsteken. In gestrekte positie kan het dier zich, traag en bedachtzaam, door middel van zijn zes poten, voort bewegen over een willekeurig substraat (het kan eventueel steile trappen opklimmen of afdalen, door struikgewas heendringen of over rotsblokken klauteren). Zodra het echter een lange weg moet afleggen en daartoe een betrekkelijk vlakke baan tot zijn beschikking heeft, drukt het zijn kop op de grond en rolt zich bliksemsnel op, waarbij het zich afduwt met zijn poten, voor zoveel deze dan nog de grond raken. In opgerolde toestand vertoont het de gedaante van een discus-schijf, waarvan de centrale as gevormd wordt door de ogen-op-stelen. Door zich beurtelings af te zetten met één van zijn drie paren poten, kan het een grote snelheid bereiken. Ook trekt het naar believen tijdens het rollen (b.v. bij het afdalen van een helling, of om zijn vaart uit te lopen) de poten in en gaat "freewheelende" verder. Wanneer het er aanleiding toe heeft, kan het op twee wijzen weer in wandel-positie overgaan: ten eerste abrupt, door zijn lichaam plotseling te strekken, maar dan ligt het op zijn rug, met zijn poten in de lucht en ten tweede door geleidelijke snelheidsvermindering (remming met de poten) en langzame achterwaartse ontrolling in stilstaande toestand.

== See also ==
- Rolling and wheeled creatures in fiction and legend

== Sources ==
- Locher, J. L. (2000). The Magic of M. C. Escher. Harry N. Abrams, Inc. ISBN 0-8109-6720-0.
