= Remedios Varo =

Spanish Catalan artist (1908–1963)

- Varo at her easel, 1958
- Born: María de los Remedios Alicia Rodriga Varo y Uranga; 16 December 1908; Anglès, Spain
- Died: 8 October 1963 (aged 54); Mexico City, Mexico
- Education: Real Academia de Bellas Artes de San Fernando
- Movement: Surrealism

María de los Remedios Alicia Rodriga Varo y Uranga (known as Remei or Remedios Varo, 16 December 1908 – 8 October 1963) was a Spanish surrealist painter, writer, and graphic artist. Her work features Surrealist worlds, where science, mysticism, and magic mix together.

One of the first women to study at the Royal Academy of Fine Arts of San Fernando in Madrid, she went on to establish herself in Barcelona in 1932. While there, she worked as a graphic designer and joined the Surrealist group Logicofobista. In 1937, Remedios moved to Paris with French poet Benjamin Péret. With the Nazis arrival in Paris in 1940, she self exiled to Mexico. Varo never returned to Spain.

Despite widespread belief, Remedios Varo never became a Mexican citizen. Though she never returned to her homeland, she kept her Spanish citizenship, unlike her friend Leonora Carrington, who was naturalized as citizen of Mexico.

== Early life and education ==
María de los Remedios Alicia Rodriga Varo y Uranga was born on 16 December 1908 in Anglès, a small town in the province of Girona, in Catalonia. Remedios was named in honor of the Virgen de los Remedios ("Virgin of Remedies") as a 'remedy' for an older sister's death. She had two surviving siblings: an older brother Rodrigo, and a younger brother Luis. Her mother, Ignacia Uranga y Bergareche, was born in Argentina to Basque parents and her father, Rodrigo Varo y Zajalvo, was from Córdoba in Andalusia.

When Varo was a young child, her family moved frequently throughout Spain and North Africa to follow her father's work as a hydraulic engineer. While her father was a somewhat agnostic liberal who studied Esperanto, (Note: Esperanto, a constructed international auxiliary language, was associated with anticlericalism in Spain at the time.) her mother was a devout Catholic and enrolled her in a strict convent school at the age of eight. Varo's father encouraged her artistic endeavors, taking her to museums and having her meticulously copy his diagrams. While in school, Varo was somewhat rebellious. She read authors such as Alexandre Dumas, Jules Verne, and Edgar Allan Poe, as well as mystical literature and Eastern spiritual works. As a teenager she became interested in dreams, writing stories which developed fantastical themes she would later explore in her art.

In 1924, Varo enrolled at the prestigious Real Academia de Bellas Artes de San Fernando in Madrid, a school known for rigid and exacting training. Aside from the required classes, (Note: The Academia's curriculum included strict and traditional study in anatomy, composition, perspective, color theory, architecture, figure drawing, still life, landscape painting, and decorative painting.) she took an elective class in scientific drawing. One of her instructors was Realist painter Manuel Benedito, from whom she learned traditional oil painting techniques. Much of the work she created from 1926–1935, particularly her academic paintings, has been lost; it is unknown what happened to those artworks.

In the 1920s, the Surrealist movement was becoming popular with the Madrid art scene; the city hosted avant-garde intellectuals and artists such as Federico García Lorca, Luis Buñuel, Rafael Alberti, and Salvador Dalí. Varo became attracted to the surreal, finding inspiration in the works of Hieronymus Bosch, Francisco Goya, and El Greco which she visited at the Museo del Prado.

== Career ==
Varo graduated from the Academia in 1930. Soon after, she married former classmate Gerardo Lizárraga in San Sebastián. Lizárraga was a fellow Surrealist who worked in both visual arts and filmmaking; he was also an anarchist. Following an outbreak of violence in Madrid resulting from the establishment of the Second Spanish Republic, Varo and Lizárraga moved to Paris. In Paris, Varo enrolled at the Académie de la Grande Chaumière and quickly dropped out, realizing she did not want to remain within the confines of formal education. Working odd jobs and engaging with the Parisian art scene, the couple stayed in the city for a year before moving to Barcelona in 1932.

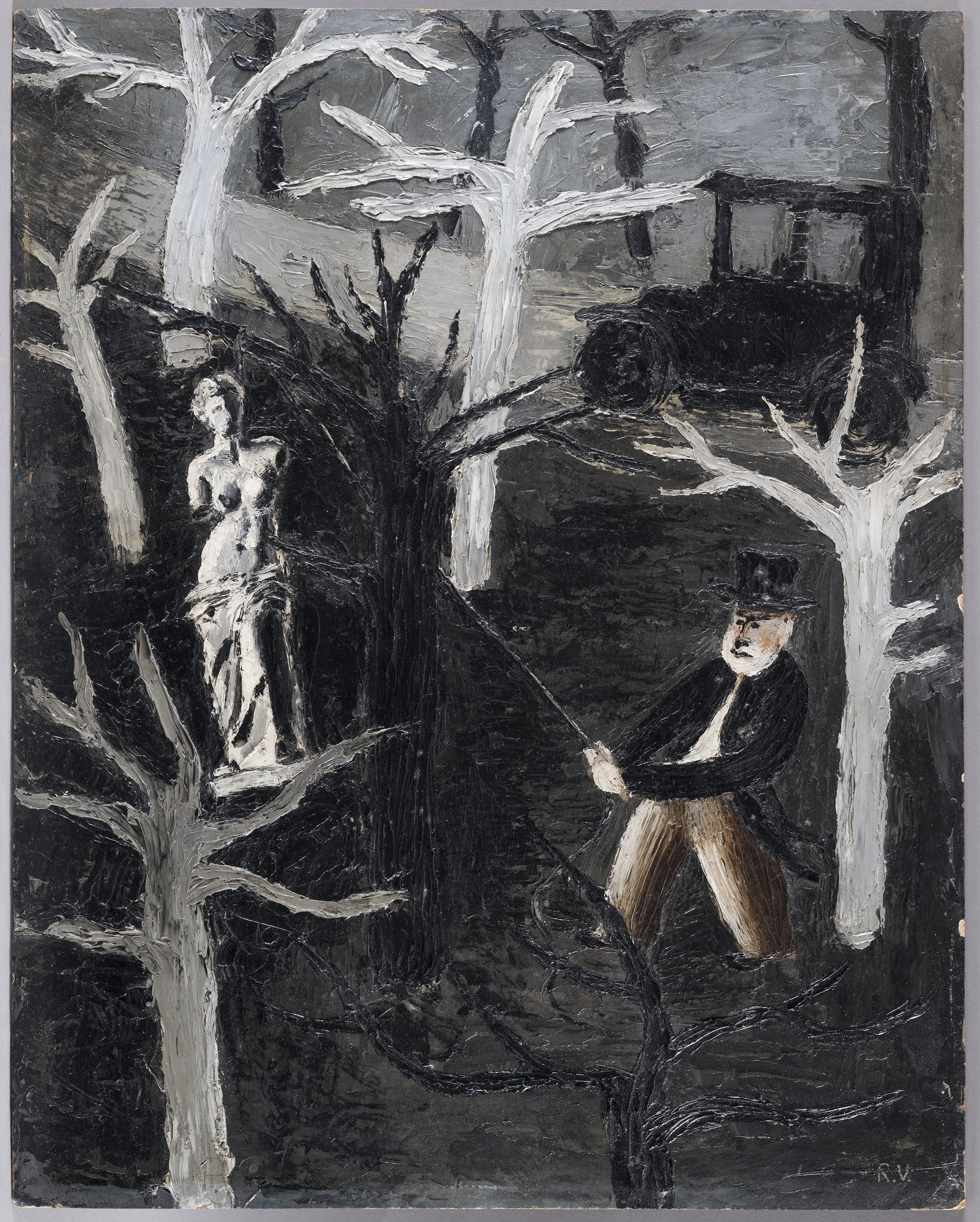
Accidentalitat de la dona - Violència, c. 1932–1936

By the early 1930s, Barcelona had become the liberal and avant-garde artistic center of Spain, more so than Madrid. Soon after arriving, Varo started a romantic relationship with fellow artist Esteban Francés, although still living with Lizárraga; this was the first of multiple open relationships she would have. While in Barcelona, Varo and Lizárraga worked for an advertising firm. Varo became part of a circle of other avant-garde artists, including José Luis Florit and Óscar Domínguez, and with Francés she came into contact with French Surrealists. While sharing an art studio on the Plaça de Lesseps with Francés, Varo began creating her first artworks after graduating from the Academia. Her work of the mid-1930s indicates familiarity with contemporary Spanish and French Surrealist imagery. Varo often played the popular Surrealist game cadavre exquis with her friends, and sent works she had made via the game to fellow artist and friend Marcel Jean for circulation in Paris.

By the summer of 1935, the tension and violence which had caused Varo and Lizárraga to leave Madrid had spread throughout Spain; the Spanish Civil War began the next year. Varo's brother Luis enlisted in the Francoist army and died of typhoid fever soon thereafter, a course of events which would come as a shock to Varo. It was in this context that Domínguez introduced Varo to French Surrealist poet Benjamin Péret, who had arrived in Barcelona in August 1936 to volunteer with the Republican faction. Péret was highly politically active; he was a member of the Trotskyist POUM and staunchly anti-clerical. Varo and Péret soon became romantically involved; his 1936 volume of love poetry, Je sublime, was dedicated to her.

=== France ===
When Péret decided to return to Paris in 1937, Varo joined him. Francés soon followed, and would compete with Péret for Varo's affection. Through Péret, Varo became acquainted with the inner circle of Surrealists, including André Breton, Max Ernst, Victor Brauner, Joan Miró, Wolfgang Paalen, and Leonora Carrington. Varo felt intimidated by Breton—and Péret—at Surrealist gatherings, as the two fostered an atmosphere which André Thirion compared to an "entrance exam". By the late 1930s, Varo had started giving her year of birth as 1913 instead of 1908; this would later be reflected on her passport and grave. According to biographer Janet Kaplan, she may have fabricated being five years younger to fit more closely to the Surrealist ideal of the femme-enfant: an uncorrupted, childlike woman intuitively connected with the unconscious mind. During the period of 1937–1939, Varo experimented with new techniques and influences, finding inspiration in the works of her friends Dalí, Ernst, Paalen, Brauner, and René Magritte. Never formally a part of the Surrealist group, Varo nonetheless participated in the 1936 London International Surrealist Exhibition and subsequent International Surrealist Exhibitions in Tokyo, Paris, Mexico City, and New York. Her work was also often republished in Surrealist periodicals, including Minotaure.

While in Paris with Péret, Varo lived the impoverished and bohemian life typical of artists. They both worked numerous odd jobs; Varo, along with Domínguez, resorted to forging de Chirico paintings when particularly destitute. As she was living with Péret, she became romantically involved with Brauner (Note: Their relationship would result in a dispute between Francés, Domínguez, and Brauner in August 1938. After Francés criticized Varo's multiple romantic relationships during a gathering in Domínguez's studio, Domínguez threw a glass at him and accidentally hit Brauner, blinding him in one eye.) and her work of the period was heavily influenced by his.

==== World War II ====
In 1939, the Nationalists claimed victory in Spain and Francisco Franco disallowed anyone associated with the Republicans from entering the country. Varo became permanently unable to return to her home and was isolated from her family. This deeply affected her and was a source of pain and regret throughout her life. In July of the same year, the French government began evacuating Paris, and in September World War II officially began. Varo and her circle stayed in the city, which for the first eight months of war saw little action other than an influx of foreign refugees from elsewhere in Europe. As a foreign national herself, Varo now risked deportation in an increasingly hostile environment. Her association with the communist Péret put her at further risk, and he was imprisoned in early 1940 for his political activism. Varo was imprisoned as well, at some point in 1940, for her relationship with Péret. She never spoke about this experience; the length and location of her internment and the conditions she faced are unknown. However, according to friends' accounts, it had an intense effect on her.

While viewing a documentary film on French internment camps by Hungarian photojournalist Emerico Weisz, by coincidence Varo recognized Gerardo Lizárraga, to whom she was still legally married. They had lost contact when Varo left Spain, while Lizárraga remained to fight for the Republicans; when the Nationalists won, he fled to France and was imprisoned. After seeing the film, Varo and her network successfully bribed authorities and secured the release of Lizárraga.

On 14 June 1940, the Nazis invaded Paris, putting Varo at imminent risk. She, along with millions of other Parisians, fled to the unoccupied south of France. Domínguez insisted she take his seat in a car going south, and eventually she arrived in the coastal village of Canet-Plage. Initially staying with Jacques Hérold and several other refugees, she soon moved in with Brauner. By August 1940, she had left Canet-Plage for Marseille and reunited with now-free Péret. Marseille was, although unoccupied, not safe; the Gestapo maintained a presence in the city. Varo and Péret found shelter with Varian Fry's Emergency Rescue Committee, an organization dedicated to facilitating the migration of artists and intellectuals from wartime Europe to the Americas. Over time, much of Varo's circle made it to Marseille, where they shared their limited funds among each other and met nightly in cafés.

The situation in Marseille deteriorated in 1940 and 1941, and the Rescue Committee recognized Péret and Varo's immediate need to escape the Vichy authorities. With Péret having been denied entry into the United States due to his communist politics, they looked toward Mexico, which had declared amnesty for Spanish refugees in 1940. The Rescue Committee made appeals for funding of their travel to Mexico, and found places for them on the liner Serpa Pinto, due to depart from Casablanca. Through unknown means, (Note: According to Varo they paid an intermediary to secure passage on a black market fishing boat. The intermediary then left them stranded on the docks and stole their money. However, the operator of the fishing boat was later revealed as a serial killer of the refugees who had boarded his boat; Varo and Péret had unknowingly escaped. The reality of how they got to Casablanca is undocumented. Varo's biographer Janet Kaplan speculates they may have disguised themselves as French soldiers or merchants.) Varo and Péret arrived in Casablanca and boarded the ship, which was crowded with other refugees.

=== Mexico ===
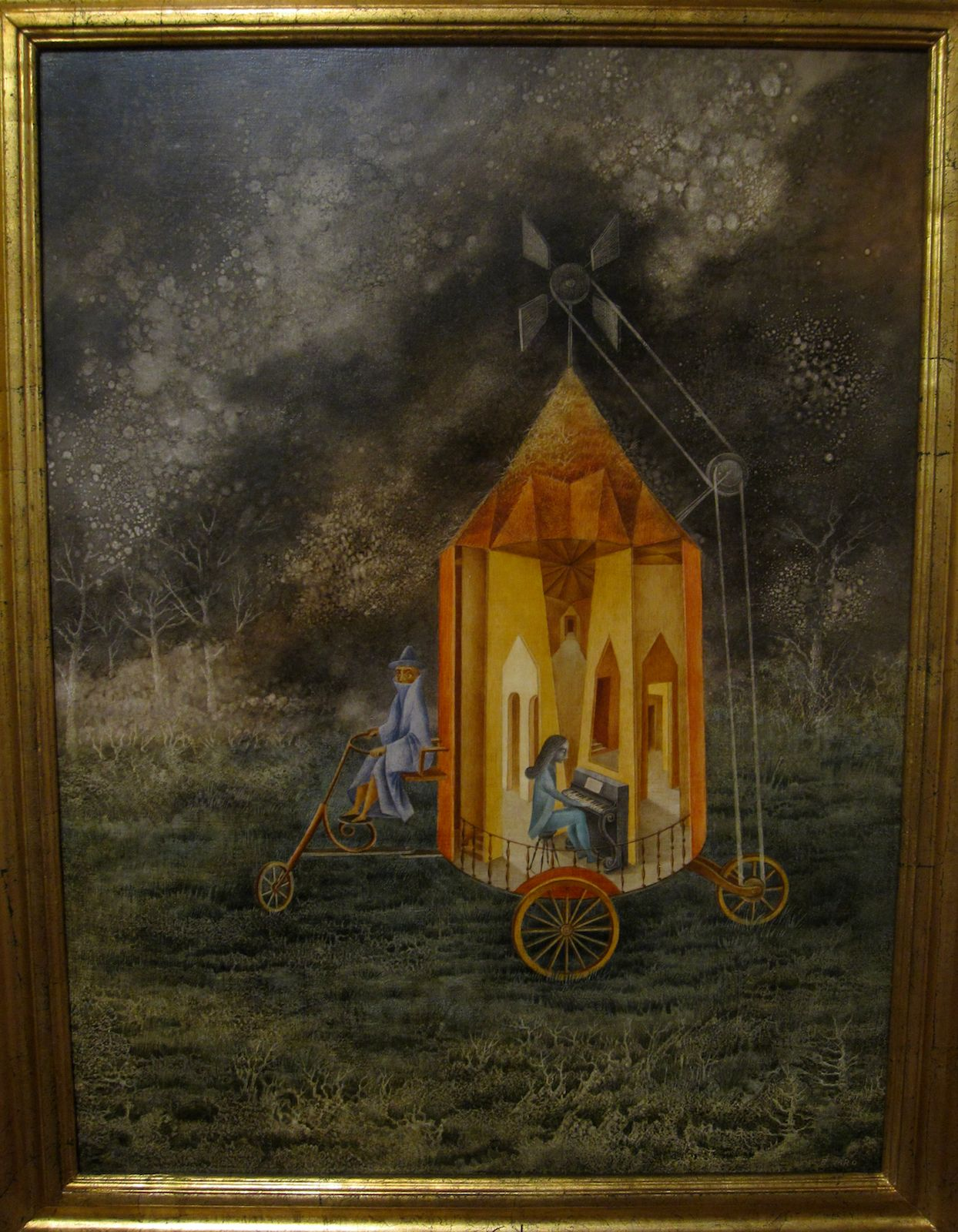
Roulotte, 1956

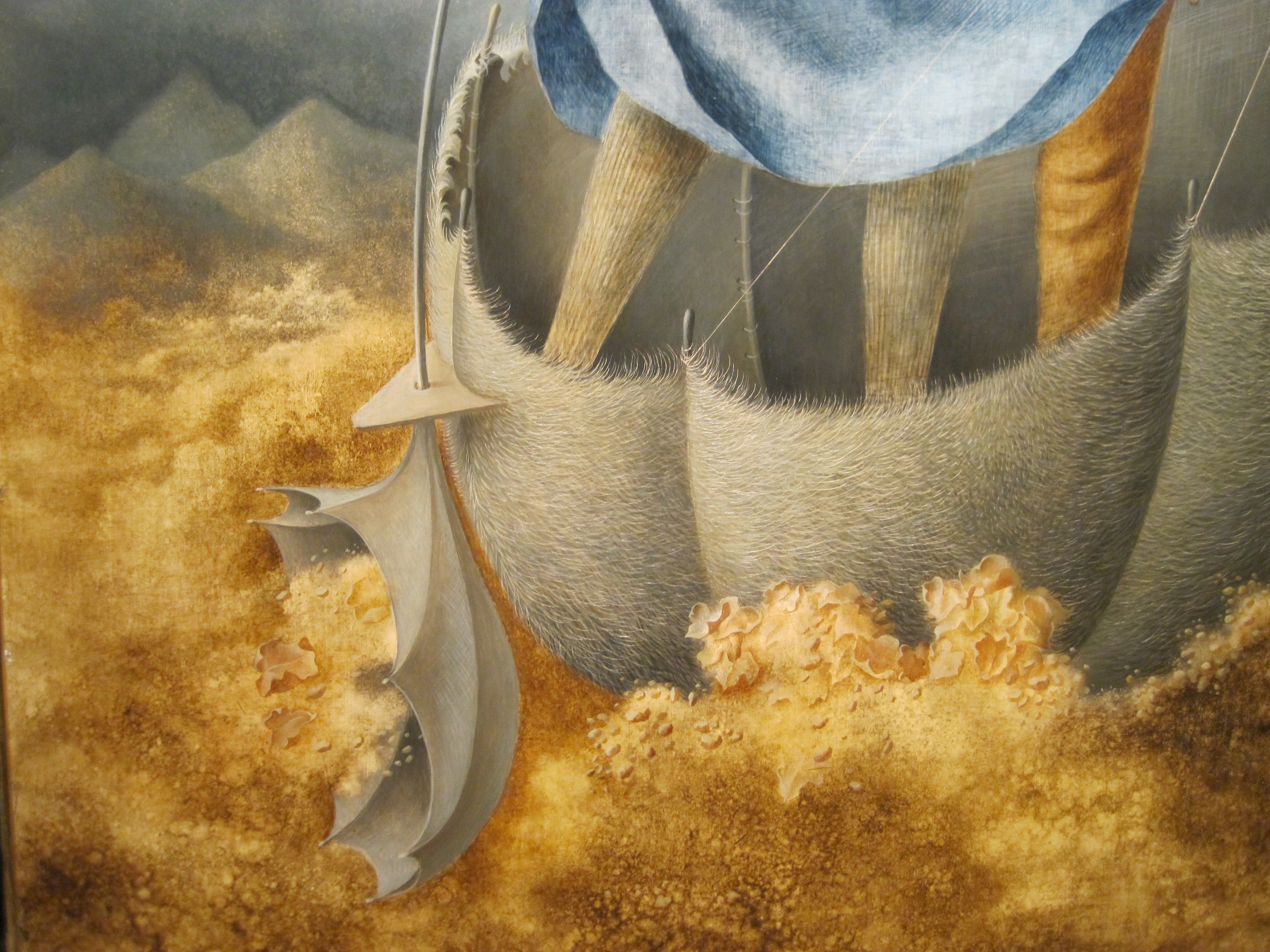
La huida, detail, 1961

Varo arrived in Mexico City in late 1941, part of a large migration of Spanish intellectuals and artists. The Mexican government under Lázaro Cárdenas gave Spanish refugees asylum and automatic citizenship, with few restrictions on employment; the European émigrés therefore contributed significantly to Mexico's economy and culture. Varo and Péret, rather than becoming ingratiated with the Mexican artistic community, preferred to associate with other Europeans, including old friends Lizárraga and Francés. Also within their circle were Gunther Gerzso, Kati Horna, Emerico Weisz, Dorothy Hood, Luis Buñuel, César Moro, Wolfgang Paalen, and Alice Rahon. Leonora Carrington, whom Varo had previously met in Paris, would become Varo's closest friend.

Varo and Péret rented a tenement apartment together in the Colonia San Rafael neighborhood, which Varo decorated with artwork and objects she thought of as magical. She also took care of several birds and stray cats. They were impoverished, and Varo supported herself and Péret by working odd jobs, including for Marc Chagall. She made her most consistent living from producing illustrations for Bayer advertisements. During the early 1940s, Varo focused on writing as a creative outlet, producing few paintings.

In 1947 Péret wanted to return to France, while Varo wished to stay in Mexico, which by then she viewed as her home. Péret moved back to Paris, and Varo started a relationship with a French pilot and fellow refugee named Jean Nicolle. They initially moved in together with Horna in the Colonia Roma neighborhood; they later moved into Lizárraga's previous apartment.

Soon after, she joined a French scientific expedition in Venezuela with Nicolle. There she visited her mother and brother Rodrigo, an epidemiologist. Varo, staying in Caracas and Maracay, studied mosquitoes with a microscope and produced drawings of them for a Public Ministry of Health campaign against malaria. She returned to Mexico City in 1949, after struggling to obtain funds for travel back.

In 1952 Varo married Austrian refugee Walter Gruen, and ended her career in commercial graphic design in favor of her personal art. Varo found critical and financial success with two exhibitions at the Galería Diana, including her first solo exhibition, in 1955–1956. The success of the 1955 solo exhibition allowed Varo to establish a waiting list for buyers. Her second and final solo exhibition took place at the Galería Juan Martín in 1962; all of the paintings displayed were sold.

Varo painted her final finished canvas, titled Still Life Reviving, in 1963. She died of a heart attack on 8 October of the same year.

==== Relationship with Leonora Carrington and Kati Horna ====
Initially having met in Paris in the 1930s when the latter was living with Max Ernst, Varo and Carrington reunited in Mexico City. Carrington was an English artist who bonded with Varo over their shared experiences. (Note: When the two met in Mexico, Carrington had recently been released from hospitalization in a mental institution in Spain, and Varo had been released from French imprisonment.) Carrington and Varo shared an interest in the occult and magic, and they found inspiration in the folk practices of Mexico.

Among all the refugees that were forced to flee from Europe to Mexico City during and after World War II, Remedios Varo, Leonora Carrington, and Kati Horna formed a bond that would immensely affect their lives and work. They lived close to each other in the Colonia Roma district of Mexico City.

Varo and Carrington had previously met through André Breton while living in Paris. Although Horna did not meet the other two until they were all in Mexico City, she was already familiar with the work of Varo and Carrington after being given a few of their paintings by Edward James, a British poet and patron of the surrealist movement.

All three attended the meetings of followers of the Russian mystics Peter Ouspensky and George Gurdjieff. They were inspired by Gurdjieff's study of the evolution of consciousness and Ouspensky's idea of the possibility of four-dimensional painting. Though deeply influenced by the ideas of the Russian mystics, the women often ridiculed the practices and behavior of those in the circle. The trio were sometimes referred to as "the three witches", because of their interest in the occult and spiritual practices.

After becoming friends, Varo and Carrington began writing collaboratively and wrote two plays together which were not published: El santo cuerpo grasoso and (unfinished) Lady Milagra. Using a technique similar to cadavre exquis, they took turns writing small segments of text and put them together. Even when not writing together, they were often drawing from the same sources of inspiration and using the same themes in their paintings. Varo and Carrington remained close friends until Varo's death in 1963.

== Artistic influences ==
The characters pictured in Varo's artwork resemble herself, with heart-shaped faces, long noses, and almond-shaped eyes. According to art historian Janet Kaplan, much of her work is autobiographical in nature; her 1960–1961 triptych reflects her time as a student in a restrictive convent school. Her paintings, often depicting journeys and encounters with strange people, also reflect the frequent travel of her childhood and her traumatic experience of exile and war.

With the discovery of the pre-Columbian village Tlatilco in the early 1940s, Varo began collecting pre-Columbian artifacts from the site and elsewhere; she developed a large collection over time. However, indigenous Mexican influence on her art was limited, and she continued to mostly draw from European sources throughout her mature period.

=== Philosophical influences ===
Varo considered surrealism as an "expressive resting place within the limits of Cubism, and as a way of communicating the incommunicable".

Even though Varo was critical of her childhood religion, Catholicism, her work was influenced by religion. She differed from other Surrealists because of her constant use of religion in her work. She also turned to a wide range of mystic and hermetic traditions, both Western and non-Western, for influence. She was influenced by her belief in magic and animistic faiths. She was very connected to nature and believed that there was strong relation between the plant, human, animal, and mechanical world. Her belief in mystical forces greatly influenced her paintings. Varo was aware of the importance of biology, chemistry, physics, and botany, and thought it should blend together with other aspects of life. Her fascination with science, including Einstein's theory of relativity and Darwinian evolution, has been noted by admirers of her art.

She turned with equal interest to the ideas of Carl Jung as to the theories of George Gurdjieff, P. D. Ouspensky, Helena Blavatsky, Meister Eckhart, and the Sufis, and was as fascinated with the legend of the Holy Grail as with sacred geometry, witchcraft, alchemy, and the I Ching. Varo described her beliefs about her own powers of witchcraft in a letter to English author Gerald Gardner, "Personally, I don't believe I'm endowed with any special powers, but instead with an ability to see relationships of cause and effect quickly, and this beyond the ordinary limits of common logic." In 1938 and 1939, Varo joined her closest companions Frances, Roberto Matta, and Gordon Onslow Ford in exploring the fourth dimension, basing much of their studies on Ouspensky's book Tertium Organum. The books Illustrated Anthology of Sorcery, Magic and Alchemy by Grillot de Givry and The History of Magic and the Occult by Kurt Seligmann were highly valued in Breton's Surrealist circle. She saw in each of these an avenue to self-knowledge and the transformation of consciousness.

=== Surrealist influences ===
One critic states, "Remedios seems to never limit herself to one mode of expression. For her tools of the painter and the writer are unified in breaking down our visual and intellectual customs". Even so, most classify her as a surrealist artist in that her work displays many trappings of the surrealist practice. Her work displays a liberating self-image and evokes a sense of otherworldliness which is so characteristic of the surrealist movement. One scholar notes that Varo's practice of automatic writing directly correlates to that of the Surrealists. The father of Surrealism, André Breton, excluded women as fundamental to the movement of Surrealism, but after Varo's death in 1963, he connected her "forever to the ranks of international surrealism".

== Techniques ==
Varo extensively used graphite-on-paper preparatory drawings to plan her paintings; she also created many drawings independent of painting. Prior to starting a painting, Varo would make multiple graphite sketches and a final drawing on masonite or canvas. From the mid-1950s onward, Varo typically used the smooth side of hardboard layered with gesso and then sanded to create an even surface for painting. She then scratched fine lines irregularly throughout the board to create a distinctive texture; she may have used the quartz crystals she kept on her easel to create the scratches. She then transferred the sketch onto her prepared painting surface.

When painting, Varo often painted the entire background environment before adding the figures or other prominent elements she had planned. She used glazing and various texturing techniques popular among Surrealists such as stippling, hatching, blotting, decalcomania, and soufflage to create atmospheric effects. Varo would finish a painting by rendering details with fine brushes and sgraffito (delicately scratching through the paint to the gesso layer). Other techniques she used include grattage, scumbling, spattering, sponging, drying pooled paint, and inlaying mother-of-pearl. She often signed her paintings using sgraffito. She varnished her paintings with a damar resin varnish she probably made herself.

== Writings ==
Varo wrote numerous surrealist stories, letters, dream narratives, and other works, mainly in composition notebooks. Many of her writings involve similar motifs to her paintings. According to Margaret Carson, the notebooks likely date from the mid-1950s to the early 1960s. Carson also speculates that many of the works in these notebooks were copies of originals written elsewhere, which may have been much earlier. Most of her writings were untitled and undated. Her husband Walter Gruen preserved an archive of her written works, which mostly remained unpublished and private until after her death in 1963. In 1965, her 1959 faux-anthropological work On Homo rodans (an accompanying text for her sculpture Homo rodans) was printed as a facsimile, and reprinted in 1970. Gruen donated her personal archive of papers, as well as other belongings, to the Museo de Arte Moderno in 2018.

Varo's writing attracted little attention in scholarship until 1997, when an edited collection of her work was published. Subsequently, her written work has mainly been analyzed in comparison with her paintings. Like her paintings, her writing was influenced by psychoanalysis. She wrote multiple letters to fictional psychiatrists and psychoanalysts, incorporating both real biographical details and fantasy.

== Analysis of Varo's artwork ==
Scholarship on Varo's body of work has mainly focused on her experience of exile and travel, her esoteric and philosophical influences, or her place as a woman in the Surrealist movement. Mexican philosopher Juliana González, a friend of Varo's, writes that an element of "Romantic optimism" in her art distinguishes Varo from the broader Surrealist movement.

Later in her career, her characters developed into her emblematic androgynous figures with heart-shaped faces, large almond eyes, and the aquiline noses that represent her own features. Varo often depicted herself through these key features in her paintings, regardless of the figure's gender. "Varo tends to not play out personal strife on the canvas but rather portrays herself in various roles in surreal dreamscapes". "It is Varo herself who is the alchemist or explorer. In creating these characters, she is defining her identity".

Many of Varo's works depict animals, primarily cats and birds. Varo also frequently depicted hybrid creatures which combined cats, owls, or women. Cats play varied roles in Varo's art; sometimes they are observers, conveyors of symbolism, or "familiars". A small minority of her paintings feature cats as the central subject; (Note: Examples include the human-feline hybrids in Cat Man (1943), Feline Personage (1945), and Feline Lady (1953), and Cats' Paradise (1955) and The Cat Fern (1957).) generally, cats occupy a collaborative role in the scene. (Note: Examples include Sympathy (1955), Revelation or The Clockmaker (1955), Cosmic Energy (1956), Mimesis (1960), and Vegetal Architecture (1962).) In Varo's work, birds usually represent imagination and spiritual enlightenment; in some paintings such as Creation of the Birds (1958) and The Encounter (1962), owl-human hybrids represent wisdom.

Varo's work also focuses on psychoanalysis and its role in society and female agency. In speaking on Woman leaving the Psychoanalyst (1961), one of Varo's biographers states, "Not only does Varo debunk the idea of a correct process of mental healing, but also she trivializes the very nature of that process by representing the impossible: a physical and literal dismissal of the father, Order, and in Lacanian terms the official entrance into culture: verbal Language".

=== Feminist analysis ===
The Surrealist movement, like the broader intellectual culture of the period, was dominated by men who often held misogynistic views and sidelined women. Varo did not consider her own work feminist, although her paintings have been interpreted through a feminist lens. According to the art historian Deborah Haynes, Varo subverted the typically patriarchal attitudes of the Surrealists with her ambiguously gendered paintings.

== Legacy ==
In 1964, the National Museum of Modern Art in the Palacio de Bellas Artes held a tribute exhibition of Varo's work, with record attendance. The Museo de Arte Moderno in Mexico City held a retrospective exhibition in 1971, which attracted the then-highest attendance in the museum's history, and again in 1983 and 1994. More than fifty of her works were displayed in a retrospective exhibition in 2000 at the National Museum of Women in the Arts in Washington, DC. In 2023, the Art Institute of Chicago held an exhibit of her work, marking the first time in 20 years Varo's work had been exhibited in the U.S., with half of the pieces being shown in the U.S. for the first time.

Varo's artwork is well known in Mexico, but is not as well known throughout the rest of the world.

== Selected list of works ==
- 1955 Revelation / The Clockmaker
- 1955 Useless Science / The Alchemist
- 1955 Hermit
- 1955 The Flutist
- 1955 Solar Music
- 1955 Rupture
- 1955 Roulotte
- 1955 The World Beyond
- 1955 Sympathy
- 1956 The Juggler
- 1956 Harmony
- 1957 Creation of the Birds
- 1957 Women's Tailor
- 1957 Vagabond
- 1958 Farewell
- 1958 Celestial Pablum
- 1959 Hairy Locomotion
- 1959 Exploration of the Sources of the Orinoco River
- 1959 Encounter
- 1959 Disturbing Presence
- 1959 Homo rodans
- 1960 Ascension to Mount Analogue
- 1960 To Be Reborn
- 1960 Woman Leaving the Psychoanalyst
- 1960 Mimesis
- 1960–1961 Triptych
  - 1960 Towards the Tower
  - 1961 Embroidering the Earth's Mantle
  - 1961 The Escape
- 1961 Unsubmissive Plant
- 1961 The Call
- 1962 Spiral Transit
- 1962 Phenomenon
- 1962 Vegetarian Vampires
- 1962 Emerging Light
- 1963 The Lovers
- 1963 Phenomenon of Weightlessness
- 1963 Still Life Reviving
