= Ron Walotsky =

American artist

Ron Walotsky (21 August 1943 – July 29, 2002) was an American science fiction and fantasy artist who studied at the School of Visual Arts.

Born in Brooklyn, he began a long and prolific career painting book and magazine covers starting with the May 1967 issue of The Magazine of Fantasy & Science Fiction. His first book cover was for Living Way Out by Wyman Guin. He would go on to do covers for Stephen King, Anne Rice, Bruce Sterling, Roger Zelazny, Robert Silverberg, John Varley and many others. He was also nominated for the Chesley Awards twelve times. Some of his art is collected in Inner Visions: The Art of Ron Walotsky (2000).

Walotsky has illustrated cards for the Magic: The Gathering collectible card game. Ron Walotsky also did an oil painting to be used as a poster for Dorothy Dietrich, a well known magician and curator of The Houdini Museum In Scranton, Pa.
