= Bio of a Space Tyrant =

Science fiction novel series by Piers Anthony

- Refugee (1983); Mercenary (1984); Politician (1985); Executive (1985); Statesman (1986); The Iron Maiden (2001)
- Author: Piers Anthony
- Country: United States
- Discipline: Science fiction
- Publisher: Avon Books; Last book self-published; Reissued mid-2010s by Open Road Integrated Media
- No. of books: 6

Bio of a Space Tyrant series is a six-book science-fiction series by Piers Anthony based within the Solar System. The series revolves around the character Hope Hubris and his family, and charts Hope's ascent from poor Hispanic refugee to Tyrant of Jupiter, a single person heading the Executive, Judicial and Legislative branches of the government. It is considerably more adult-themed than many of Anthony's earlier works.

The novels are set in a future several hundred years distant at a point where the nations of Earth have expanded into and filled the Solar System. Various planets, moons and asteroids within the Solar System have political, religious and geographical affiliations similar to those on 1980s Earth. Many events in the series parallel modern-day situations; for instance, Mars is controlled by the countries formerly comprising the Middle East, and has the largest supply of iron, the primary fuel in Anthony's universe. Ganymede parallels Cuba, and has a Communist government allied with North Saturn's, which corresponds to the Soviet Union. A "Missile Crisis" is an event in the series; many other such correspondences abound.

The series is presented as Hope's first-person autobiography, and includes his image as a tyrant and womanizer. It is clear from the introductions and epilogues that Hope died before his memoir's publication and that his career as military man, politician, executive and statesman was greatly misunderstood by the public, especially his various affairs with women, a major focus of the series.

== Series synopsis ==
1. Refugee (1983) ISBN 0-7388-0693-5
  Follows Hope and his family's flight from their home on Callisto to Jupiter. Hope's family sets out in a "space bubble" with many other refugees. The group is attacked repeatedly by space pirates, and most of the adults are raped, killed, or kidnapped by the end of the story.
2. Mercenary (1984) ISBN 0-380-87221-8
  Chronicles Hope's years as a migrant laborer and 15-year career in the Navy, largely under his sister Spirit's guidance. One of the stranger aspects of the Navy is the Tail, a militarily administered bordello all servicemen, and servicewomen, are required to use on a monthly basis.
3. Politician (1985) ISBN 0-380-89685-0
  Hope's marriage is a major focus of the story of his political career as he ascends through Jupiter's political system, culminating in his election as president. One of his chief rivals is Tocsin, a man with some of the characteristics of Richard Nixon. The book begins with Hope held captive on a spaceship while his captors attempt to brainwash him into being a pawn of unknown adversaries; it is implied that Tocsin is involved.
4. Executive (1985) ISBN 0-380-89834-9
  Follows Hope's career as president after his widely popular election and the subsequent constitutional convention establishing him as the eponymous space tyrant. While Jupiter's political system is a more or less exact analogue of the current U.S. system, the constitutional convention is not. On the grounds that a constitutional convention set up the current system of government (three separate branches, Executive, Judicial, and Legislative, with built-in checks and balances), it is proposed that a second convention can dissolve it. The president of the convention then appoints Hope as the single, supreme head of the government.
5. Statesman (1986) ISBN 0-7388-0701-X
  Covers Hope's waning years in exile after leaving office, especially his advocacy of a new light-speed travel method and attempts to foster unity and peace in the solar system.
6. The Iron Maiden (2001) ISBN 1-4010-4396-8
  Covers the same period as the first five books from the point of view of Hope's sister, Spirit. Fills in many gaps when the two siblings were apart.

== Solar geography ==
Many of the situations in the series are direct parallels to real situations on Earth. For instance, Hope at one point is stationed on Chiron (an analogue of Cyprus) in order to keep the peace between colonists of Greek and Turkish descent; the attempt by Hope's family, Hispanic refugees from a moon of Jupiter that is analogous to Hispaniola, to enter Jupiter resembles problems in the U.S. with immigration, including Hope's inability to find work as anything other than a poorly paid agricultural worker.

The Solar System of Anthony's universe directly parallels the political makeup of modern Earth, as outlined in appendices in the series. Following are the many correspondences:

- Mercury - South Africa
- Venus - North Africa
- Earth - India
  - Luna (the Moon) - Sri Lanka
- Mars - The Middle East
  - Phobos - Israel
  - Deimos - The West Bank
- Minor planets
  - Hidalgo - Hawaii
  - Chiron - Cyprus
- Jupiter
  - North - North America
  - South - South America
  - The Great Red Spot - Mexico
    - Amalthea - The Bahamas
    - Io - Puerto Rico
    - Europa - Jamaica
    - Ganymede - Cuba
    - Callisto - Hispaniola
    - Outer moons - Lesser Antilles
- Saturn
  - North - Soviet Union
  - South - China
    - Inner satellites - The Philippines
    - Outer satellites - Indonesia
    - Rings - Taiwan
    - Titan - Japan
- Uranus - Europe
  - Miranda - Crete
  - Ariel - Sardinia
  - Umbriel - Ireland
  - Titania - England
  - Oberon - Iceland
- Neptune - Australia
  - Triton - New Zealand
  - Nereid - Tasmania
- Pluto - Antarctica
  - Charon - Falkland Islands
