= Iron Maiden (disambiguation) =

Iron Maiden are a British heavy metal band.

Iron Maiden may also refer to:

- Iron maiden, a torture device

== Arts, entertainment, and media ==
=== Fictional entities ===
- Iron Maiden (Marvel Comics), a fictional Russian super villain from Marvel Comics
- Iron Maiden, a supervillain from the comic book T.H.U.N.D.E.R. Agents
- Iron Maiden and Iron Maiden II, battleships from the anime series Trinity Blood
- Eiserne Jungfrau, also known as "Iron Maidens" in English, characters of 07th Expansion Sound Novel Umineko no Naku Koro ni
- Iron Maiden Jeanne, a character in the anime and manga series Shaman King
- Valda the Iron Maiden, a comic book character

=== Music ===
- Iron Maiden (album), the band Iron Maiden's self-titled debut album and its title song
- "Iron Maiden", a song by Ghostface Killah from the album Ironman
- The Iron Maidens, U.S. all-female tribute band to Iron Maiden UK band
- "Iron Maiden", a song by Flotsam & Jetsam from the album Flotsam and Jetsam

=== Video games ===
- Neon Genesis Evangelion: Iron Maiden, a 1998 video game
- Neon Genesis Evangelion: Iron Maiden 2nd, a 2005 video game

=== Other uses in arts, entertainment, and media ===
- The Iron Maiden, a novel from the Bio of a Space Tyrant series by Piers Anthony
- The Iron Maiden, a 1962 British comedy film which was released in the U.S. as Swinging Maiden

== Other uses ==
- Iron Maiden, a nickname for a high entrance/exit turnstile
- Iron Maiden, nickname of the KC-135 Stratotanker, a U.S. Air Force mid-air refueling airplane
- Iron Maiden, a nickname for American professional female bodybuilder Iris Kyle

== See also ==
- Iron Duke (disambiguation)
- Iron Lady (disambiguation)
- Iron Man (disambiguation)
- Iron Woman (disambiguation)
