= Woman of Steel (disambiguation) =

Woman of Steel is an English rugby league award.

Woman of Steel or Women of Steel may also refer to:

== Film and television ==
- "Woman of Steel", a chapter of the manga series Prison School
- Woman of Steel, a 2010 Taiwanese television series broadcast by ntv7
- Women of Steel (film), a 2020 Australian documentary film

== Other uses ==
- Woman of Steel (album), a 2019 album by Yemi Alade
- Women of Steel, a 2016 sculpture by Martin Jennings.
- Women of Steel, a nickname for Motherwell F.C. Women

== See also ==
- Iron Lady (disambiguation)
- Iron Woman (disambiguation)
- Man of Steel (disambiguation)
- Men of Steel (disambiguation)
- Señora Acero, an American telenovela
- Soy tu dueña (International English title: A Woman of Steel), a Mexican telenovela
