= Iron Woman =

Iron Woman or Ironwoman may refer to:

- The Iron Woman, a 1993 science fiction novel by Ted Hughes
- The Iron Woman (film), a 1916 American silent film
- The Iron Woman (Deland novel), a 1911 novel of manners by Margaret Deland
- Ironman (surf lifesaving) for women
- Ironman Triathlon for women
- "La Dame de Fer", French nickname for the Eiffel Tower
- Iron Woman (Marvel Comics Character), an alias used by Pepper Potts

== See also ==
- Iron Baron (disambiguation)
- Iron Duke (disambiguation)
- Iron Man (disambiguation)
- Iron Lady (disambiguation)
- Iron Lord (disambiguation)
- Iron Maiden (disambiguation)
- Woman of Steel (disambiguation)
