= Chelsea, London =

District in West London, England

Coordinates: 51.4875°N 0.1684°W

Chelsea
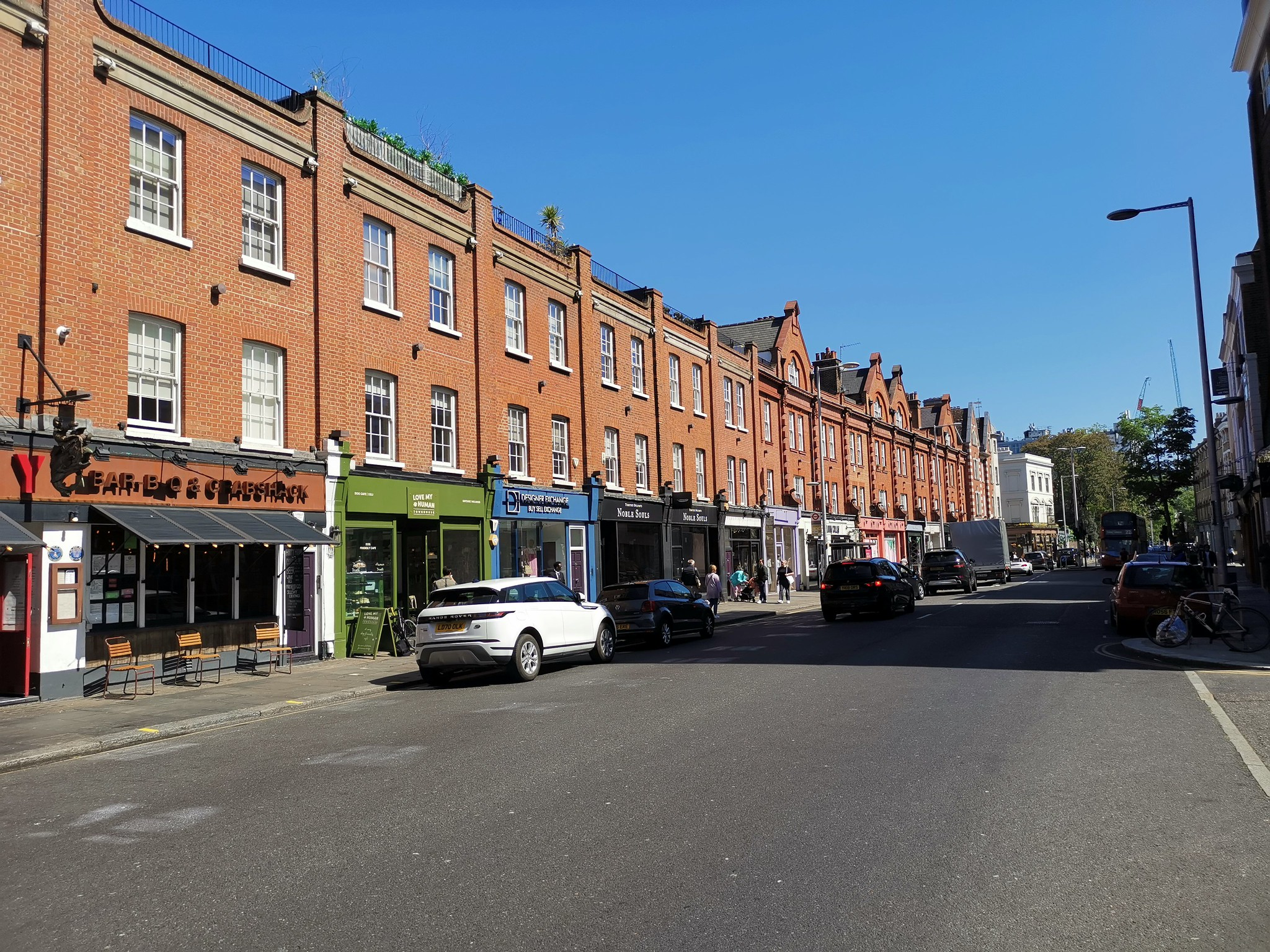
- King's Road

- Location within Greater London
- Population: 41,440
- OS grid reference: TQ275775
- London borough: Kensington & Chelsea
- Ceremonial county: Greater London
- Region: London
- Country: England
- Sovereign state: United Kingdom
- Post town: LONDON
- Postcode district: SW1, SW3, SW10
- Dialling code: 020
- Police: Metropolitan
- Fire: London
- Ambulance: London
- UK Parliament: Chelsea and Fulham; Kensington and Bayswater
- London Assembly: West Central

Chelsea is an area in West London, England, due south-west of Charing Cross by approximately 2.5 miles (4 km). It lies on the north bank of the River Thames and for postal purposes is part of the south-western postal area.

Chelsea historically formed a manor and parish in the Ossulstone hundred of Middlesex, which became the Metropolitan Borough of Chelsea in 1900. It merged with the Metropolitan Borough of Kensington, forming the Royal Borough of Kensington and Chelsea upon the creation of Greater London in 1965.

The exclusivity of Chelsea as a result of its high property prices historically resulted in the coining of the term "Sloane Ranger" in the 1970s to describe some of its residents, and some of those of nearby areas. Chelsea is home to one of the largest communities of Americans living outside the United States, with 6.53% of Chelsea residents in 2001 born in the U.S.

== History ==
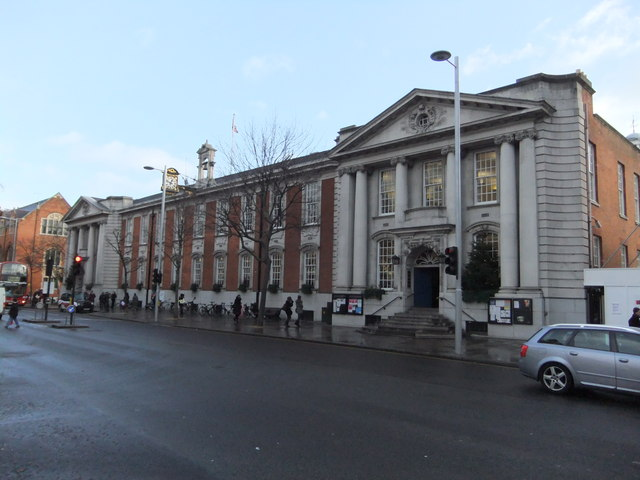
Chelsea Town Hall

=== Early history ===
The word Chelsea (also formerly Chelceth, Chelchith, or Chelsey,) originates from the Old English term for "landing place [on the river] for chalk or limestone" (Cealc-hyð: chalk-wharf, in Anglo-Saxon). Chelsea hosted the Synod of Chelsea in 787 AD. The first record of the Manor of Chelsea precedes the Domesday Book and records the fact that Thurstan, governor of the King's Palace during the reign of Edward the Confessor (1042–1066), gave the land to the Abbot and Convent of Westminster. From at least this time, up to 1900, the Manor and Parish of Chelsea included a 144-acre (0.58 km^{2}) exclave which is now known as Kensal Town. The exclave, which was once heavily wooded, was sometimes also known as Chelsea-in-the-Wilderness.

Abbot Gervace subsequently assigned the manor to his mother, and it passed into private ownership. By 1086 the Domesday Book records that Chelsea was in the hundred of Ossulstone in Middlesex, with Edward of Salisbury as tenant-in-chief.

King Henry VIII acquired the manor of Chelsea from Lord Sandys in 1536; Chelsea Manor Street is still extant. Two of King Henry's wives, Catherine Parr and Anne of Cleves, lived in the Manor House; Princess Elizabeth – the future Queen Elizabeth I – resided there; and Thomas More lived more or less next door at Beaufort House. In 1609 James I established a theological college, "King James's College at Chelsey" on the site of the future Royal Hospital Chelsea, which Charles II founded in 1682.

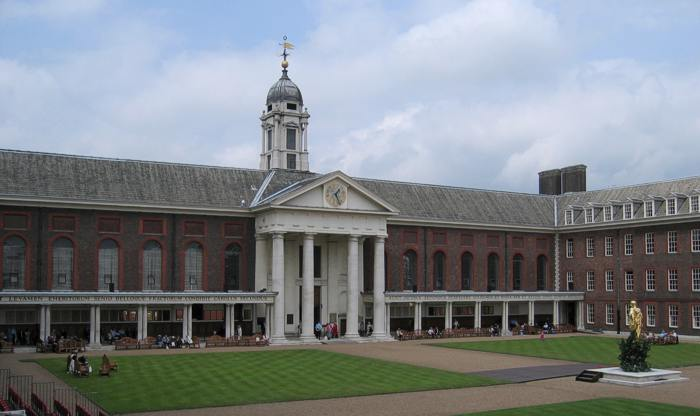
Figure Court of Royal Hospital Chelsea

By 1694, Chelsea – always a popular location for the wealthy, and once described as "a village of palaces" – had a population of 3,000. Even so, Chelsea remained rural and served London to the east as a market garden, a trade that continued until the 19th-century development boom which caused the final absorption of the district into the metropolis. The street crossing that was known as Little Chelsea, Park Walk, linked Fulham Road to King's Road and continued to the Thames and local ferry down Lover's Lane, renamed "Milmans Street" in the 18th century.

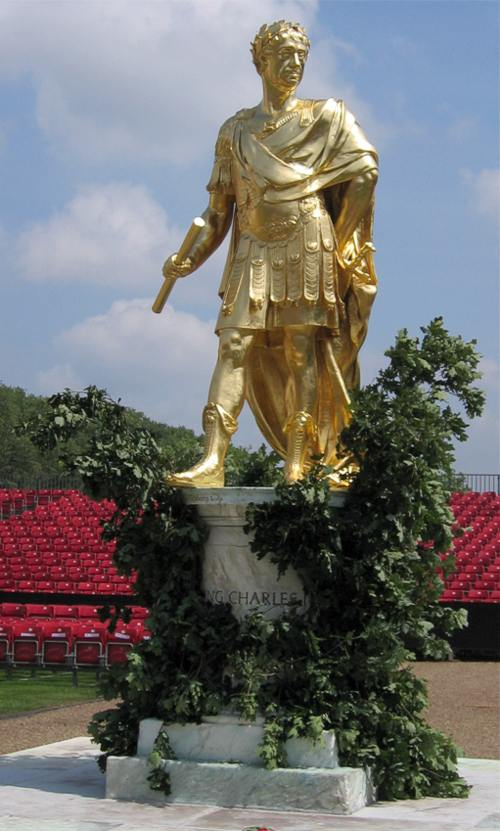
Statue of King Charles II on the grounds of the Royal Hospital Chelsea

King's Road, named for Charles II, recalls the King's private road from St James's Palace to Fulham, which was maintained until the reign of George IV. One of the more important buildings in King's Road, the former Chelsea Town Hall, popularly known as "Chelsea Old Town hall" – a fine neo-classical building – contains important frescoes. Part of the building contains the Chelsea Public Library. Almost opposite stands the former Odeon Cinema, now Habitat, with its iconic façade which carries high upon it a large sculptured medallion of the now almost-forgotten William Friese-Greene, who claimed to have invented celluloid film and cameras in the 1880s before any subsequent patents.

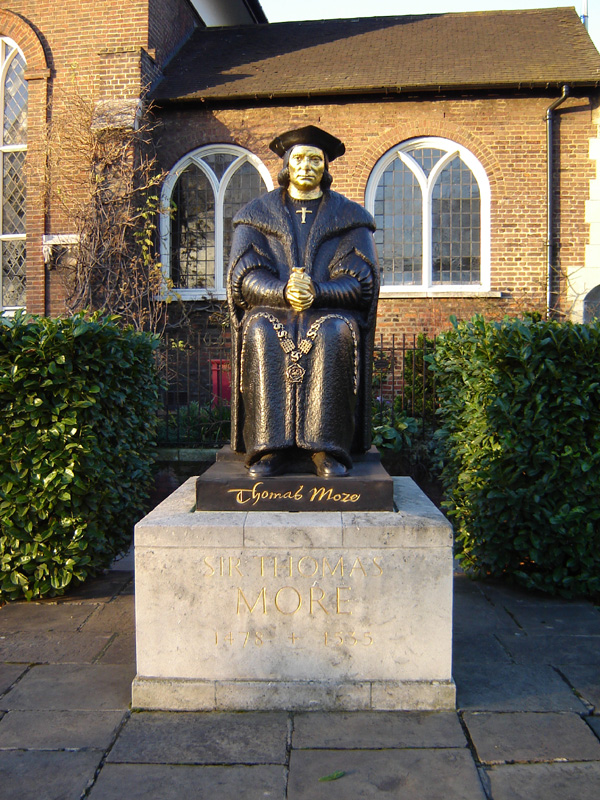
Statue of Thomas More on Cheyne Walk with Chelsea Old Church in the background (2006)

The memorials in the churchyard of Chelsea Old Church, near the river, illustrate much of the history of Chelsea. These include Lord and Lady Dacre (1594/1595); Lady Jane Cheyne (1698); Francis Thomas, "director of the china porcelain manufactory"; Sir Hans Sloane (1753); Thomas Shadwell, Poet Laureate (1692). The intended tomb Sir Thomas More erected for himself and his wives can also be found there, though More is not in fact buried here.

In 1718, the Raw Silk Company was established in Chelsea Park, with mulberry trees and a hothouse for raising silkworms. At its height in 1723, it supplied silk to Caroline of Ansbach, then Princess of Wales.

Chelsea once had a reputation for the manufacture of Chelsea buns, made from a long strip of sweet dough tightly coiled, with currants trapped between the layers, and topped with sugar. The Chelsea Bun House sold these during the 18th century and was patronised by the Georgian royalty. At Easter, great crowds would assemble on the open spaces of the Five Fields – subsequently developed as Belgravia. The Bun House would then do a great trade in hot cross buns and sold about quarter of a million on its final Good Friday in 1839.

The area was also famous for its "Chelsea China" ware, though the works, the Chelsea porcelain factory – thought to be the first workshop to make porcelain in England – were sold in 1769, and moved to Derby. Examples of the original Chelsea ware fetch high values.

The best-known building is Chelsea Royal Hospital for old soldiers, set up by Charles II (supposedly on the suggestion of Nell Gwynne), and opened in 1694. The beautifully proportioned building by Christopher Wren stands in extensive grounds, where the Chelsea Flower show is held annually. The former Duke of York's Barracks (built 1801–3) off King's Road is now part of Duke of York Square, a redevelopment including shops and cafes and the site of a weekly "farmers' market". The Saatchi Gallery opened in the main building in 2008. Chelsea Barracks, at the end of Lower Sloane Street, was also in use until recently, primarily by ceremonial troops of the Household Division. Situated on the Westminster side of Chelsea Bridge Road, it was bought for re-development by a property group from Qatar.

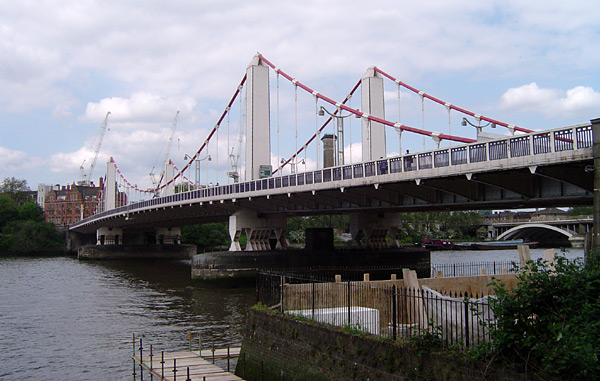
Chelsea Bridge from the south bank

St Mark's College, Chelsea, was founded in 1841, based on the beliefs of The Reverend Derwent Coleridge, son of the poet Samuel Taylor Coleridge, its first principal: that its primary purpose was to widen the educational horizons of its students. During the First World War, St Mark's College was requisitioned by the War Office to create the 2nd London General Hospital, a facility for the Royal Army Medical Corps to treat military casualties. It merged with St John's College, Battersea, in 1923, establishing a single institution in Chelsea as the College of St Mark & St John. In 1973 it moved to Plymouth, having outgrown the Chelsea campus. The former chapel of St Mark's College, designed by Edward Blore is on the Fulham Road, Chelsea, and is now a private residence.

Dring the mid-1800s, Cremorne Gardens, London, was a popular pleasure gardens area established in 1845. It continued to operate until 1877. The area lay between Chelsea Harbour and the end of the King's Road.

Chelsea's modern reputation as a centre of innovation and influence originated in a period during the 19th century, when the area became a Victorian artists' colony (see Borough of artists below). It became prominent once again as one of the centres of the "Swinging London" of the 1960s, when house prices were lower than in the staid Royal Borough of Kensington.

=== The borough of artists ===
Chelsea once had a reputation as London's bohemian quarter, the haunt of artists, radicals, painters and poets. Little of this seems to survive now – the comfortable squares off King's Road are homes to, amongst others, investment bankers and film stars. The Chelsea Arts Club continues in situ; however, the Chelsea College of Art and Design, founded in 1895 as the Chelsea School of Art, moved from Manresa Road to Pimlico in 2005.

The Chelsea Book Club, at no. 65 Cheyne Walk (Lombard Terrace), a bookshop that also presented exhibitions and lectures, held the first exhibition of African art in London (sculpture from Ivory Coast and Congo) in 1920, and was the first bookshop to stock Joyce's Ulysses in 1922. Sold in 1928 owing to financial problems, it became the Lombard Restaurant.

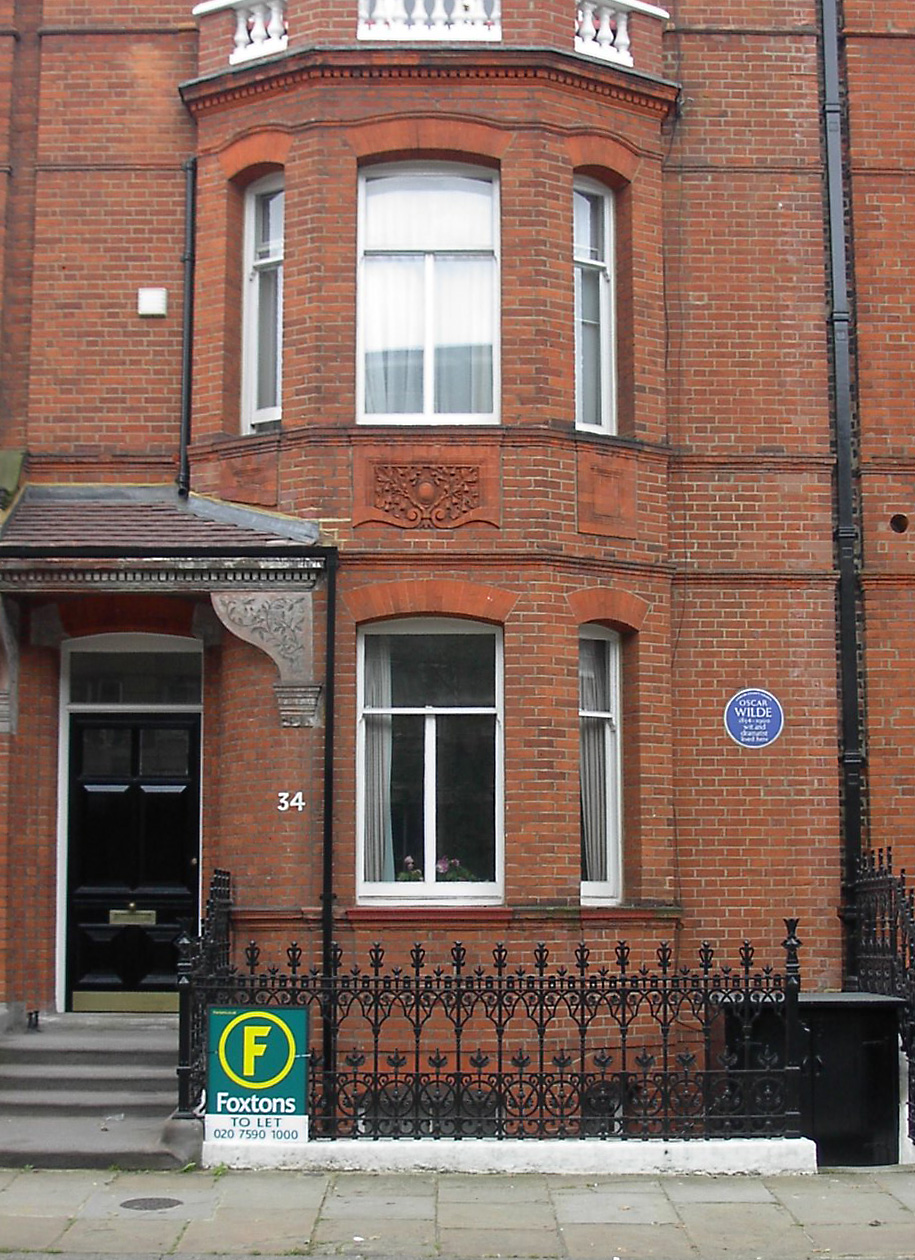
Oscar Wilde's house on Tite Street, Chelsea

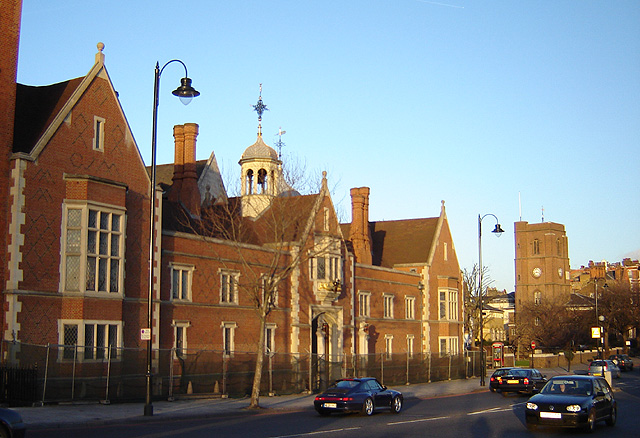
Crosby Hall on Cheyne Walk. Parts of this building date back to the time of Richard III, its first owner. But it is not native to Chelsea – it is a survivor of the Great Fire of London. It was shipped brick by brick from Bishopsgate in 1910 after being threatened with demolition. (January 2006)

Its reputation stems from a period in the 19th century when it became a sort of Victorian artists' colony: painters such as James Webb, Dante Gabriel Rossetti, J. M. W. Turner, James McNeill Whistler, William Holman Hunt, and John Singer Sargent all lived and worked here. There was a particularly large concentration of artists in the area around Cheyne Walk and Cheyne Row, where the Pre-Raphaelite movement had its heart. The artist Prunella Clough was born in Chelsea in 1919.

The architect John Samuel Phene lived at No. 2 Upper Cheyne Row between 1903 and his death in 1912. He installed numerous artefacts and objets d'art around the house and gardens and it was known locally as the "Gingerbread Castle". It was demolished in 1924.

Chelsea was also home to writers such as George Meredith, Algernon Charles Swinburne, Leigh Hunt and Thomas Carlyle. Jonathan Swift lived in Church Lane, Richard Steele and Tobias Smollett in Monmouth House. Carlyle lived for 47 years at No. 5 (now 24) Cheyne Row. After his death, the house was bought and turned into a shrine and literary museum by the Carlyle Memorial Trust, a group formed by Leslie Stephen, father of Virginia Woolf. Virginia Woolf set her 1919 novel Night and Day in Chelsea, where Mrs. Hilbery has a Cheyne Walk home.

In a book, Bohemia in London by Arthur Ransome which is a partly fictional account of his early years in London, published in 1907 when he was 23, there are some fascinating, rather over-romanticised accounts of bohemian goings-on in the quarter. The American artist Pamela Colman Smith, the designer of A. E. Waite's Tarot card pack and a member of the Hermetic Order of the Golden Dawn, features as "Gypsy" in the chapter "A Chelsea Evening".

A central part of Chelsea's artistic and cultural life was Chelsea Public Library, originally situated in Manresa Road. Its longest-serving member of staff was Armitage Denton, who joined in 1896 at the age of 22, and he remained there until his retirement in 1939; he was appointed Chief Librarian in 1929. In 1980, the building was purchased by Chelsea College of Art and Design.

The Chelsea Society, formed in 1927, remains an active amenity society concerned with preserving and advising on changes in Chelsea's built environment. Chelsea Village and Chelsea Harbour are new developments outside of Chelsea itself.

=== Swinging Chelsea ===
Chelsea shone again, brightly but briefly, in the 1960s Swinging London period and the early 1970s. The Swinging Sixties was defined on King's Road, which runs the length of the area. The Western end of Chelsea featured boutiques Granny Takes a Trip and The Sweet Shop, the latter of which sold medieval silk velvet caftans, tabards and floor cushions, with many of the cultural cognoscenti of the time being customers, including Twiggy and many others.

The "Chelsea girl" was a symbol, media critic John Crosby wrote, of what "men [found] utterly captivating", flaunting a "'life is fabulous' philosophy". Chelsea at this time was home to the Beatles and to Rolling Stones members Brian Jones, Mick Jagger, and Keith Richards. In the 1970s, the World's End area of King's Road was home to Malcolm McLaren and Vivienne Westwood's boutique "SEX" (at Number 430, the King's Road), and saw the birth of the British punk movement.

=== 1974 bombings ===
On 27 November 1974, the London unit of the Provisional Irish Republican Army exploded twin bombs on Tite Street, injuring 20 people.

=== Administrative history ===
Chelsea Manor was served by the ancient parish of Chelsea. (Such parish units were typically in place by the end of the twelfth century with their boundaries, based on those of the constituent manor or manors, rarely if ever changing.) The manor and parish formed part of the Ossulstone Hundred of the county of Middlesex.

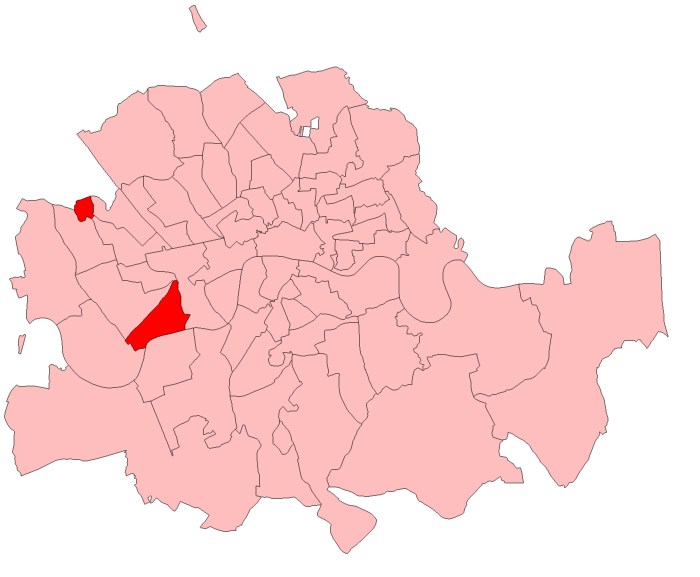
The Chelsea parliamentary constituency (1885) was coterminous with the ancient parish of Chelsea. The northern exclave of Kensal Town is shown.

The Metropolitan Borough of Chelsea in 1916

The area covered by the civil parish became the Metropolitan Borough of Chelsea in 1900, part of a new County of London. At that time, the exclave of Kensal Town, which had been part of Chelsea since at least the time of the 11th-century Saxon King Edward the Confessor, was removed from Chelsea and divided between the new boroughs of Kensington and Paddington (each of which was otherwise based on its corresponding ancient parish). The parliamentary constituency of Chelsea, which was identical to the parish, retained Kensal Town until 1918.

In 1965 the area merged with the Metropolitan Borough of Kensington to form the modern London Borough of Kensington and Chelsea.

== Geography ==
The parish and borough of Chelsea, which now forms the southern part of the Royal Borough of Kensington and Chelsea, was bounded by rivers on three sides with Fulham Road forming part of its northern boundary with Kensington.

The eastern boundary with Westminster was formed by the River Westbourne, but was adjusted to follow Chelsea Bridge Road after the river was culverted.

The short western boundary with Fulham was formed by the former Counter's Creek, of which the mouth - Chelsea Creek - is the only surviving part, with the river's route now used by the West London Line. Chelsea Football Club's Stamford Bridge home, lies just west of the Counter's Creek in Fulham, and takes its name from a bridge which carried the Fulham Road over the river. The bridge was also known as Little Chelsea Bridge.

The southern Thames frontages run west from Chelsea Bridge along the Chelsea Embankment past Albert Bridge and Battersea Bridge to Chelsea Creek. Lots Road is a major landmark on the Chelsea side of the confluence of Chelsea Creek and the Thames.

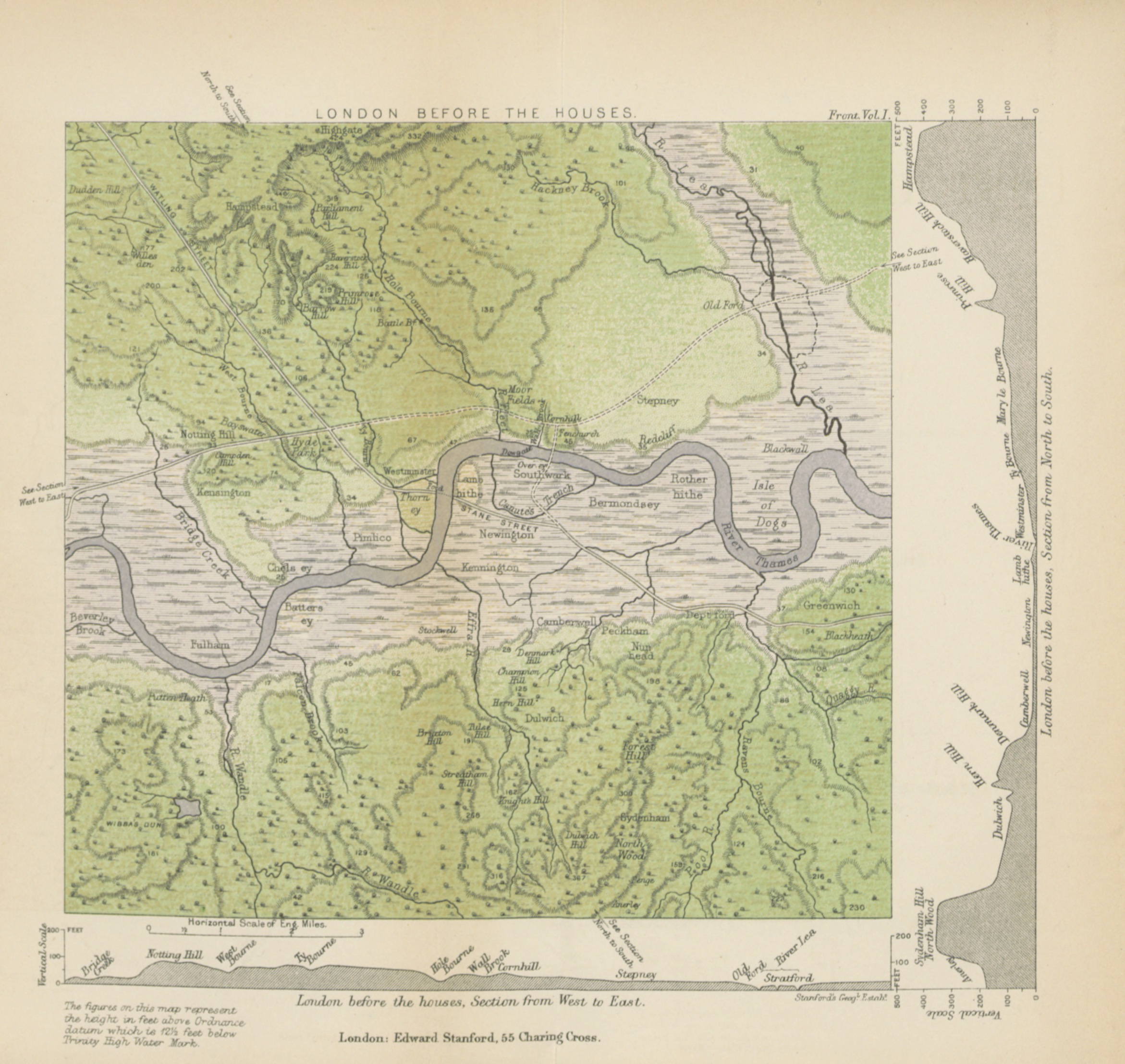

Chelsea was bounded by rivers on three sides.

Chelsea also gives its name to nearby locations, such as Chelsea Harbour in the London Borough of Hammersmith and Fulham, and Chelsea Barracks in the City of Westminster. Chelsea includes large parts of the SW3 and SW10 postal districts, and a small section of SW1.

This former fashionable village was absorbed into London during the eighteenth century. Many notable people of 18th-century London, such as the bookseller Andrew Millar, were both married and buried in the district.

King's Road is one of the district's major thoroughfares, a street which despite its continuing reputation as a shopping mecca, is now home to many of the same shops found on other British high streets, such as Gap, and McDonald's. Sloane Street and its environs is quickly catching up with Bond Street as one of London's premier shopping destinations, housing a variety of high-end fashion or jewellery boutiques such as Cartier, Tiffany & Co, Dolce & Gabbana, Prada, Gucci, Harrods, Dior, Louis Vuitton, Jimmy Choo, Giorgio Armani, Yves Saint Laurent, Chanel, Valentino, Bvlgari, Gianni Versace and Graff.

As well as a number of garden squares, Chelsea has several open spaces including Albert Bridge Gardens, Battersea Bridge Gardens, Chelsea Embankment Gardens, the Royal Hospital Chelsea (the grounds of which are used by the annual Chelsea Flower Show) and Chelsea Physic Garden.

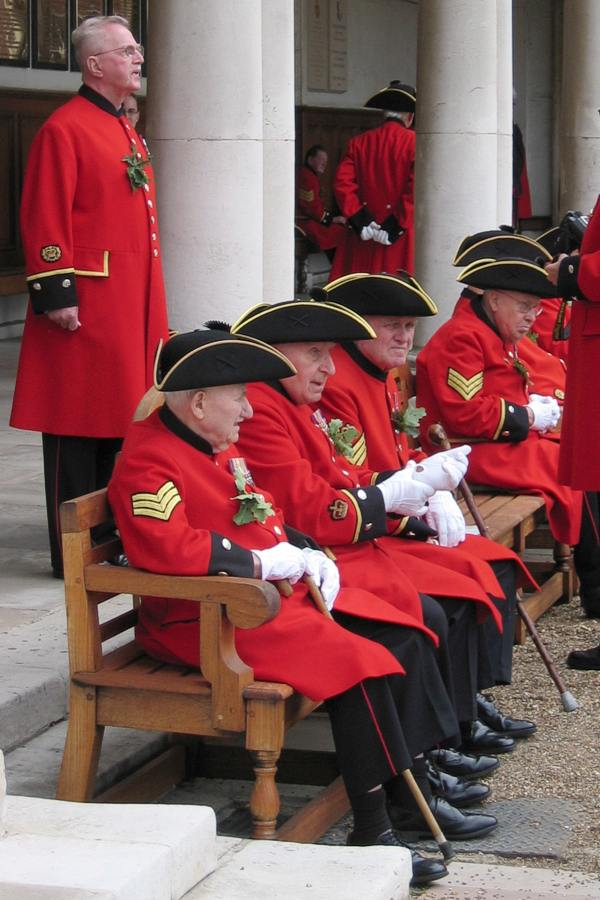
Chelsea pensioners in scarlet coats and tricorne hats at the Founder's Day parade in the Royal Hospital Chelsea

== Sport ==
In the 18th century, Chelsea Cricket Club was prominent for a time and played its home matches on what was then Chelsea Common, an area that virtually disappeared under building work in the 19th century. Records have survived of five matches between 1731 and 1789 which involved the Chelsea club and/or were played on the common.

Chelsea Football Club is located at Stamford Bridge in neighbouring Fulham, adjacent to the border with Chelsea. As a result of Chelsea's expensive location and wealthy residents, Chelsea F.C. has the wealthiest local supporters in England.

== Transport ==
=== Buses ===
Chelsea is served by many Transport for London bus services.

=== Tube and rail ===
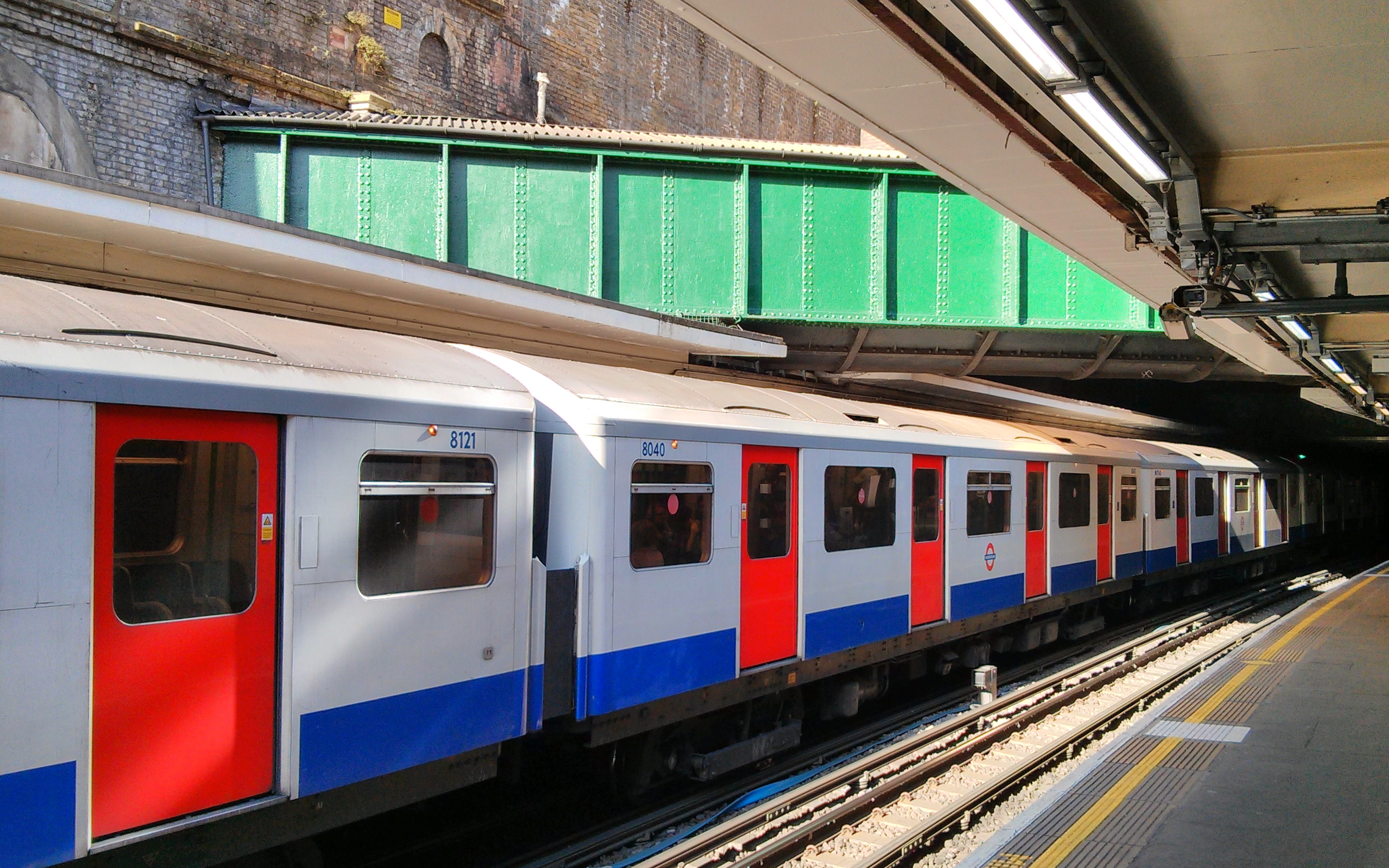
Sloane Square tube station at the eastern end of the King's Road, with the Westbourne river pipe

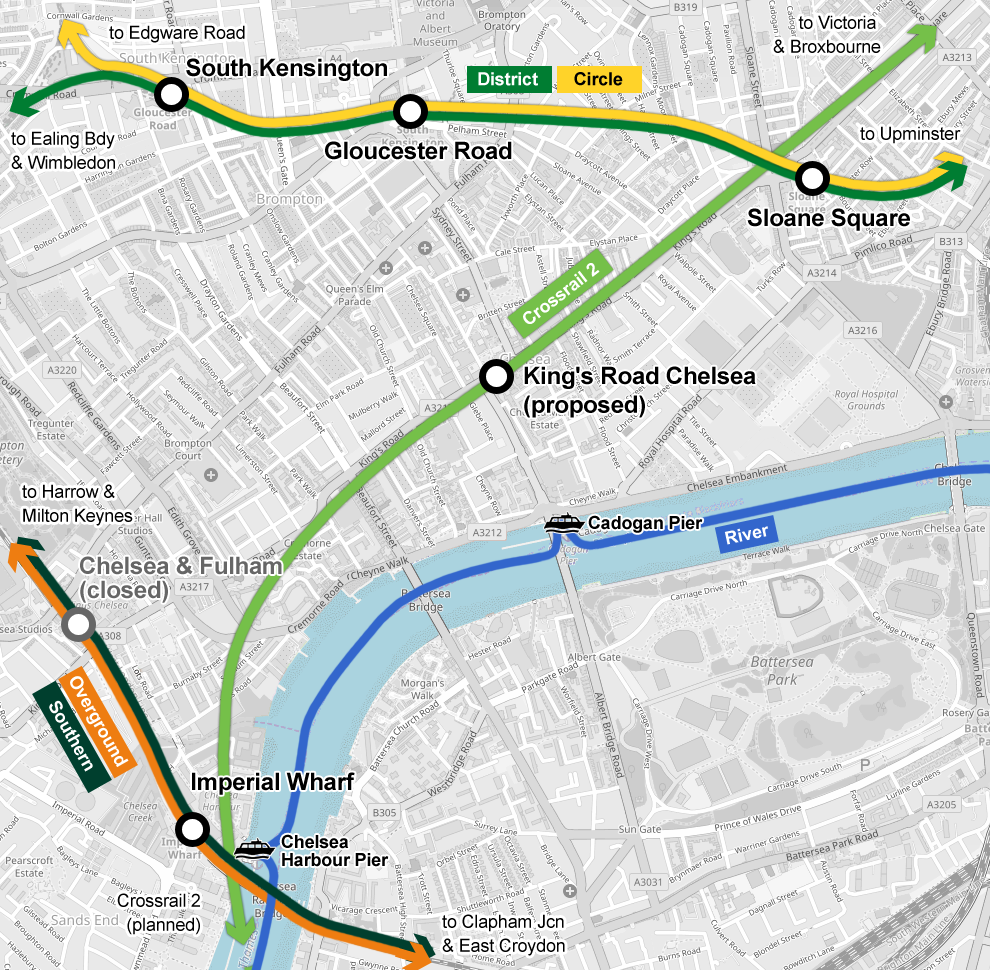
Chelsea rail and Tube map

Chelsea has no Underground station, but there are two stations close to its boundary; Sloane Square to the east and Gloucester Road to the north (both of these on the District and Circle lines). In addition, to the west is the London Overground station Imperial Wharf, on the West London Line.

A Chelsea railway station (later renamed Chelsea and Fulham) previously existed on this line, located between the King's Road and the Fulham Road in neighbouring Fulham, but this was closed in 1940 following World War II bomb damage and later demolished.

There is a proposal to construct a Chelsea Underground station on the King's Road as part of the Crossrail 2 project (also known as the Chelsea-Hackney line). The project, run by Transport for London, has not yet been approved or funded but is at the consultation stage. According to plans published by TfL in 2008, it is envisaged that the station would be located on the Dovehouse Green area of King's Road. In late 2020 central government shelved plans to progress the Crossrail 2 project.
