= Iron Lady (disambiguation) =

"Iron Lady" is a nickname of Margaret Thatcher (1925–2013), the first female prime minister of the United Kingdom.

Iron Lady may also refer to:

== Film and television ==
- The Iron Ladies, a 2008 Thai film
- The Iron Lady (film), a 2011 biographical film about Margaret Thatcher
- The Iron Lady (TV series), a 2009 Malaysian series about a strong-willed Chinese woman

== Music ==
- The Iron Lady (album), a 1979 satirical album about Margaret Thatcher
- "Iron Lady", a song by Phil Ochs from I Ain't Marching Any More, 1965

== Other uses ==
- Vénus de Quinipily or The Iron Lady, an ancient statue in Brittany, France
- Margaret Thatcher: The Iron Lady, a 2003 biography by John Campbell
- "Britain Awake", a 1976 speech by Thatcher sometimes called the "Iron Lady speech"

== People with the nickname ==
- Martine Aubry (born 1950), Minister of Labour of France (1991–1993)
- Benazir Bhutto (1953–2007), Prime Minister of Pakistan (1988–1990 and 1993–1996)
- Anson Chan (born 1940), Hong Kong Chief Secretary for Administration (1997–2001)
- Eugenia Charles (1919–2005), Prime Minister of Dominica (1980–1995)
- Indira Gandhi (1917–1984), Prime Minister of India (1966–1977 and 1980–1984)
- Dalia Grybauskaitė (born 1956), President of Lithuania (2009–2019)
- Risa Hontiveros (born 1966), Senator of the Philippines (2016-present)
- Katinka Hosszú (born 1989), Olympic champion swimmer from Hungary
- J. Jayalalithaa (1948–2016), Chief Minister of Tamil Nadu five times between 1991 and her death
- Carrie Lam (born 1957), Hong Kong Chief Secretary for Administration (2012–2017) and Chief Executive (2017–2022)
- Golda Meir (1898–1978), Prime Minister of Israel (1969–1974)
- Angela Merkel (born 1954), Chancellor of Germany (2005–2021)
- Ana Pauker (1893), Romanian Minister of Foreign Affairs (1947-1952)
- Natalia Petkevich (born 1972), First Deputy Head of the Presidential Administration of Belarus (2009–2010)
- Biljana Plavšić (born 1930), President of Republika Srpska (1996–1998)
- Miriam Defensor Santiago (1945–2016), Senator of the Philippines and Judge of the International Criminal Court
- Irom Chanu Sharmila (born 1972), civil rights activist from Manipur state in India
- Ellen Johnson Sirleaf (born 1938), President of Liberia (2006–2018) and Nobel Peace Prize recipient (2011)
- Sanae Takaichi (born 1961), Prime Minister of Japan (2025–present)
- Wu Yi (born 1938), Vice Premier of China (2003–2008)

== See also ==
- Iron Baron (disambiguation)
- Iron Crown (disambiguation)
- Iron Duke (disambiguation)
- Iron Lord (disambiguation)
- Iron Maiden (disambiguation)
- Iron Man (disambiguation)
- Iron Throne (disambiguation)
- Iron Woman (disambiguation)
- Margaret Thatcher (disambiguation)
