= Steelman =

Steelman or Steelmen may refer to:

== Sport ==
- Youngstown Steelmen (1910-1915), a minor league baseball team
- Sandvikens IF (Stålmännen , Steel Men), a Swedish soccer team
- Steelmen, several soccer teams in England; see List of football clubs in England

== People ==
=== Surname ===
- Alan Steelman (born 1942), Dallas businessman and former congressman
- David Steelman, Missouri politician and lawyer, husband of Sarah Steelman
- Farmer Steelman (1875–1944), American professional baseball player
- Glenn Steelman, American film and television director
- John R. Steelman (1900–1999), former White House chief of staff
- John Hansson Steelman (1655–1749), Delaware frontiersman and fur trader
- Paul Curtis Steelman (born 1955), American architect
- Sanford L. Steelman Jr. (born 1951), North Carolina judge
- Sara Steelman (born 1946), Pennsylvania politician and biologist
- Sarah Steelman (born 1958), Missouri politician, wife of David Steelman

=== Fictional characters ===
- Steelman and Smith, characters in Henry Lawson stories

== Other uses ==
- The Steelmen, a British band founded and fronted by Tommy Steele
- Steelman Partners, U.S. architectural firm
- Steelman, Saskatchewan, Canada
- Steelworker, also called steeler or steelman
- Sentinel Steelman, the Steelman locomotive model made by Sentinel Waggon Works
- Steelmanning, finding the best form of an opponent's argument

== See also ==
- Iron Man (disambiguation)
- Big Steel Man (born 1956), U.S. professional wrestler
- Man of Steel (disambiguation)
- Steel worker (disambiguation)
- Steeler (disambiguation)
- Steel (disambiguation)
- Man (disambiguation)
- Stahlman, a surname
