= Iron Lord (disambiguation) =

Iron Lord is a video game.

Iron Lord, Lord Iron, or Lord of Iron may also refer to:

- Iron Lord (film), a Russian historical film, 2010
- Lord Iron, a character in Daniel Abraham's novelette "The Cambist and Lord Iron"

== Other uses ==
- Iron Lady (disambiguation)
- Iron Duke (disambiguation)
- Iron Baron (disambiguation)

== See also ==
- Iron Man (disambiguation)
- Iron Woman (disambiguation)
- Iron Throne (disambiguation)
- Iron Crown (disambiguation)
