= Steelers (disambiguation) =

Steelers usually refers to the Pittsburgh Steelers, an American football team which plays in the National Football League.

Steelers may also refer to:

== Sports clubs and teams ==
- Illawarra Steelers, an Australian former rugby league club
- Kings Cross Steelers, a British rugby union club for gay and bisexual men
- Kobelco Kobe Steelers, a Japanese rugby union team
- Kuopio Steelers, a Finnish-American football club
- Pohang Steelers, a South Korean association football club
- Punjab Steelers, an Indian professional basketball team
- SC Bietigheim Steelers, an ice hockey club from Germany
- Selkirk Steelers, a Canadian junior ice hockey club
- Sheffield Steelers, a British ice hockey club

== Other uses ==
- Steelers (film), a 2021 documentary film about the Kings Cross Steelers rugby club
- The Steelers (music), vocal group from Chicago

== See also ==
- Steel worker (disambiguation)
- Steeler (disambiguation)
