= Kensal Town =

District in London, England

Coordinates: 51.524°N 0.210°W

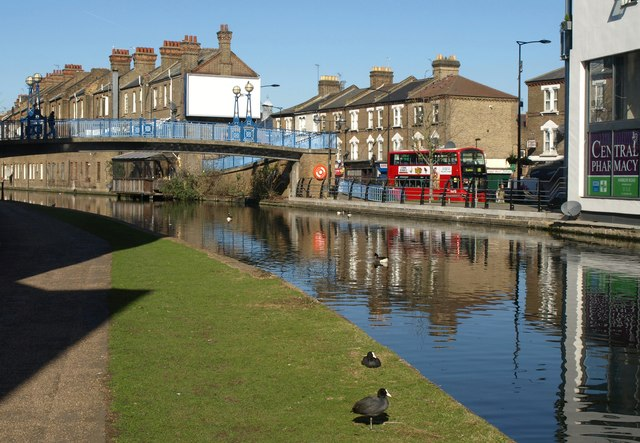
- The Grand Union Canal passing through Kensal Town

- Location within Greater London
- London borough: Kensington & Chelsea; Westminster
- Ceremonial county: Greater London
- Region: London
- Country: England
- Sovereign state: United Kingdom
- Post town: LONDON
- Postcode district: W10
- Dialling code: 020
- Police: Metropolitan
- Fire: London
- Ambulance: London
- UK Parliament: Kensington and Bayswater; Queen's Park and Maida Vale
- London Assembly: West Central; West Central

Kensal Town is a district of North West London, located partly in the Royal Borough of Kensington and Chelsea, and partly in the City of Westminster. The Grand Union Canal, which passes through it, forms the boundary of the two boroughs. The area lies four miles north-west of Charing Cross and is part of the W postcode area. Kensal Town was an exclave of Chelsea from the middle ages through to 1900.

== Origin and toponymy ==
The origin of the area was as a well wooded, 144-acre (58 ha), exclave of the Manor and Ancient Parish of Chelsea, since at least the time of Edward the Confessor, prior to the Norman Conquest, when oaks from the area were used to build Westminster Abbey. It was then known as Chelsea-in-the-Wilderness or the Hamlet of Kensal Town.

The name 'Kensal' is derived from Kingisholt, meaning 'King's Wood', first recorded in 1253. The Wood was probably located in the exclave of Chelsea now known as Kensal Town. The name 'Kensal Green' was first recorded in 1550 and applied to a long area of roadside common land, to the west of Kensal Town, in the ancient parish of Willesden. Commons were frequently situated next to coppice woodlands, and often took their names from those woods.

== 19th and 20th centuries ==
=== Arrival of the canal and the railway ===
The Grand Junction Canal (now known as the Grand Union Canal) opened in 1801 and passed through the south of what was by then a deforested but still rural area. The Great Western Railway, skirting the very south of the exclave, opened in 1838.

The Kensal New Town estate was laid out shortly after the arrival of the railway, lying south of the canal and contained by the boundaries of the exclave. The name is first recorded on an OS map of 1876. Later the name Kensal Town was applied formally to the whole of the exclave, while the name Kensal New Town remained limited to the area south of the canal and other adjacent areas of Kensington that also lay between the railway and the canal.

The newly built Kensal New Town Estate quickly attracted a large Irish community, and the surrounding area still has a significant number of Catholic churches. The Estate was disadvantaged by its position between the railway, the canal and the Kensal Green Cemetery. The area north of Harrow Road, where the Queens Park Estate was developed from 1875–81, was more prosperous.

During the 19th century, the dog dealer Bill George's 'Canine Castle' establishment was on the Kensal Road.

When the local MP for Chelsea, Emslie Horniman, presented an acre of ground between East Row and Bosworth Road to the London County Council in 1911 for recreational purposes, he stated that there was then "no place within a mile or more where children could play, except in the streets, nor anywhere for the mothers and old people to rest". The park was later expanded and is now known as Emslie Horniman Pleasance.

The area was much improved when the slums were cleared and replaced with new council housing during the mid-20th century.

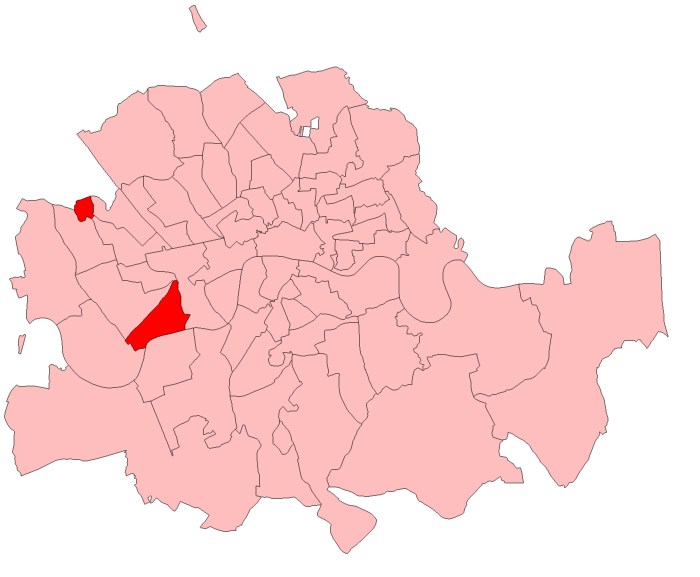
Kensal Town as part of the Chelsea parliamentary constituency, which was coterminous with the Ancient Parish of Chelsea

=== Administrative changes ===
In 1900, despite stiff local opposition, the exclave of Kensal Town was removed from Chelsea and divided between its neighbours. The area south of the canal joined with the ancient parish of Kensington to form the new Metropolitan Borough of Kensington. The area north of the canal merged with the ancient parish of Paddington to form the new Metropolitan Borough of Paddington. The area remained part of the parliamentary constituency of Chelsea (which had identical boundaries with the ancient parish of Chelsea) until 1915.

In 1965, Kensington joined with the Metropolitan Borough of Chelsea (the area of ancient parish of Chelsea, minus its former exclave) to form the new London Borough of Kensington and Chelsea. Paddington merged with Westminster and Marylebone to form what is now City of Westminster.

== Geography and landmarks ==
=== Alternative descriptions ===
Like many areas of London, different parts of Kensal Town are subject to overlapping perceptions of which district or districts they are part of. The area south of the canal, in the Royal Borough of Kensington and Chelsea and including the site of the former Kensal New Town estate, is viewed by many residents as also being in North Kensington, even though it is technically and factually part of Kensal Green.

Some of the area north of the Canal in the City of Westminster, including the Queens Park Estate and the Mozart Estate, is regarded as also being a part of Queens Park, an area that extends further to the north-east into the former parish and borough of Willesden, now the London Borough of Brent.

=== Parks ===
Emslie Horniman's Pleasance is located in the neighbourhood.

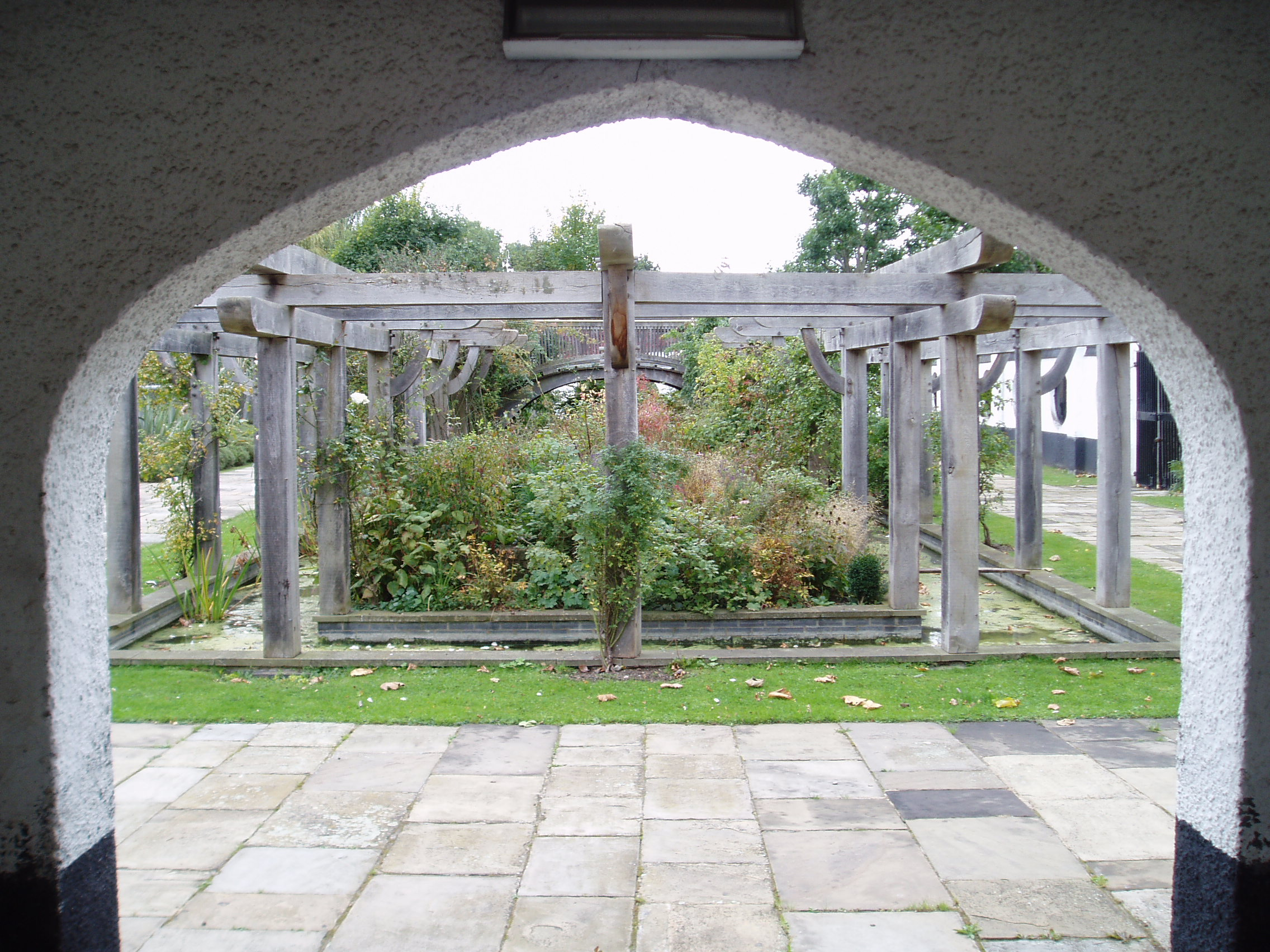
Emslie Horniman's Pleasance

== Culture and community ==
The annual Notting Hill Carnival starts at Emslie Horniman's Pleasance.

Queens Park Rangers football club was formed nearby at St Jude's institute, Ilbert Street, in 1886.
