= Kensington Vestry Hall =

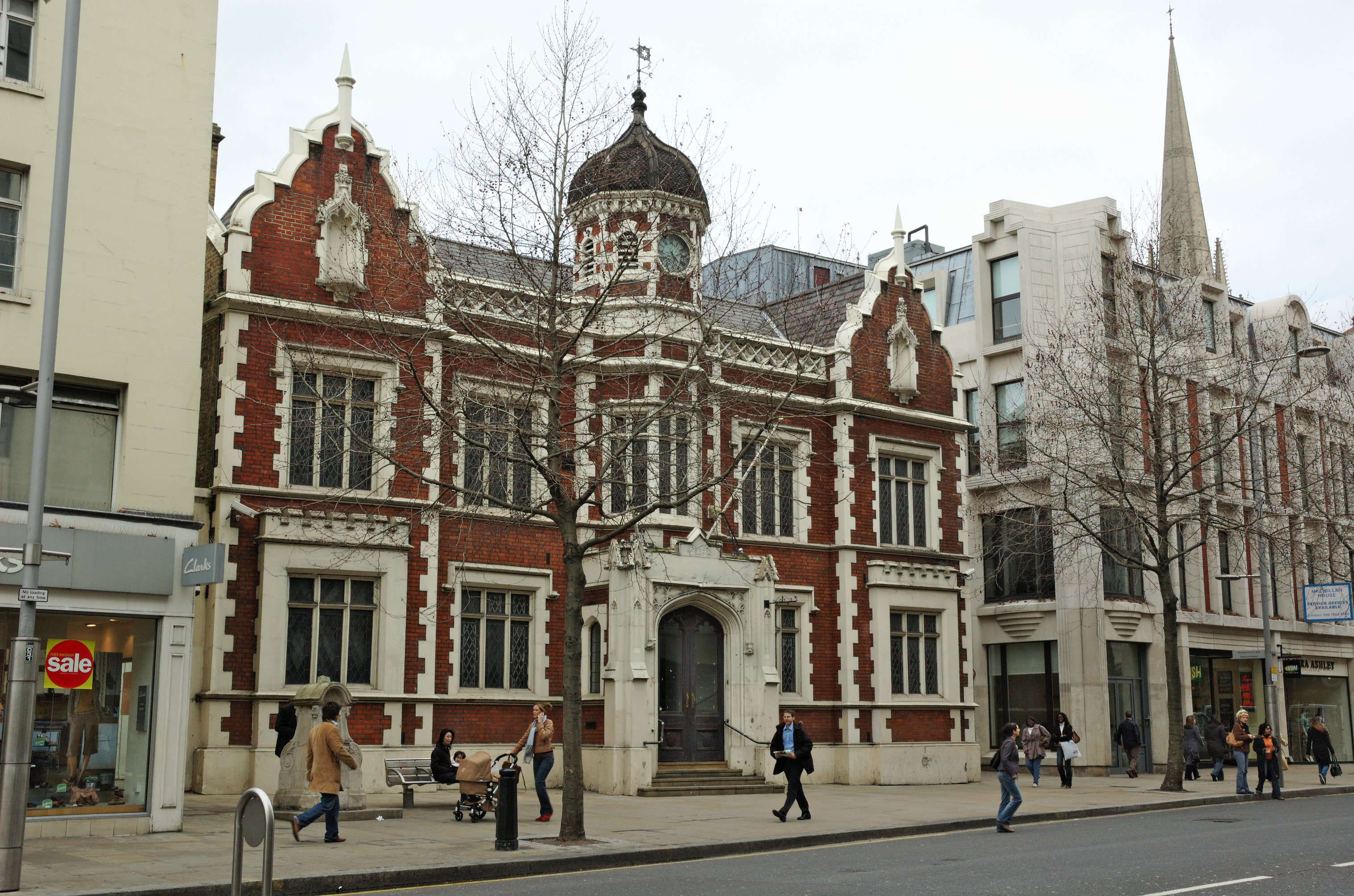
- The Kensington Vestry Hall in 2006
- Interactive map of the Kensington Vestry Hall area

General information
- Architectural style: Elizabethan style
- Classification

Listed Building – Grade II
- Designated: 15 April 1969
- Reference no.: 1223748
- Location: Kensington High Street, London, United Kingdom
- Coordinates: 51.5015°N 0.1926°W
- Completed: 1852
- Client: Kensington Vestry

Design and construction
- Architect: Benjamin Broadbridge
- Main contractor: Thomas Corby

The Kensington Vestry Hall is a former municipal building on Kensington High Street in Kensington, London, England. The structure, which was built for Kensington Vestry and now accommodates Bank Melli Iran is a Grade II listed building.

== History ==
In the first half of the 19th century parish leaders met in a room attached to St Mary Abbots Church. In 1851, the newly appointed improvement commissioners decided that this arrangement was inadequate and chose to commission a purpose-built vestry hall; the site they chose had previously been used as a burial ground by the church.

The new building was designed by the architect, James Broadbridge, in the Elizabethan style, was built by Thomas Corby in red brick with stone dressings at a cost of £5,000 and was completed in 1852. Its completion was met with dismay by ratepayers, who complained about the outlandish railings. The design involved a symmetrical main frontage with five bays facing onto Kensington High Street with the end bays gabled and slightly projected forward; the central bay, which also slightly projected forward, featured an arched porch with a stone surround, a prominent bay window on the first floor and a heraldic frieze and an octagonal clock turret at roof level. The unsightly railings were finally removed in 1880.

By the 1870s the improvement commissioners were already finding the building too small and they relocated to a more substantial building in 1880. The old vestry hall was then converted for use as the Kensington Central Library and was officially re-opened in that capacity by Princess Louise, Duchess of Argyll in November 1889. The building remained in use as a library for much of the 20th century until the Kensington Central Library relocated to a new site on Hornton Street in 1960. The old vestry hall was listed as Grade II by English Heritage on 15 April 1969 and, by 1998, it was "the only substantial remnant" of what the street looked like during the Victorian era. It subsequently became the home of Bank Melli Iran.
