= Stahlman =

Stahlman is a surname. Notable people with the surname include:

- Dick Stahlman (1902–1970), American football offensive lineman
- Edward Bushrod Stahlman (1843–1930), German-born American businessman
- James Geddes Stahlman (1893–1976), Tennessee newspaper publisher and philanthropist
- Mildred T. Stahlman (1922–2024), professor of pediatrics and pathology at Vanderbilt University
- Sylvia Stahlman (1929–1998), American soprano, particularly associated with light, coloratura roles

== See also ==
- Mount Stahlman, mountain at the west end of the Tapley Mountains in the Queen Maud Mountains, Antarctica
- Stahlman Point, mountain that liesin Linn County, Oregon about two miles south of the town of Detroit
- The Stahlman, 12 story building regarded as Nashville's second skyscraper
- Stahlmania
- Stahlmann
- Stallman
- Stallmann
- Stalman
- Stalmans
- Steelman (disambiguation)
