= Iron Marshal =

Iron Marshal may refer to:

- Shaughnessy: The Iron Marshal, 1996 CBS Western TV movie
- Louis-Nicolas Davout, French military leader
- Floriano Peixoto, Brazilian soldier and politician

== See also ==
- Iron Duke (disambiguation)
