= Made of Steel =

Made of Steel may refer to:

- Made of Steel (novella), a 2007 novella by Terrance Dicks
- "Made of Steel" (song), a 2002 song by Our Lady Peace
- "Made of Steel", a 2014 song by Twilight Force from Tales of Ancient Prophecies
- Beyond the Law (1992 film), also known as Made of Steel, an American crime drama film

== See also ==
- Man of Steel (disambiguation)
