= Iron Duke =

Iron Duke may refer to:

== People ==
- Fernando Álvarez de Toledo, 3rd Duke of Alba (1507–1582), Spanish noble, general, and diplomat involved in the Eighty Years' War
- Arthur Wellesley, 1st Duke of Wellington (1769–1852), British soldier and statesman
- Luís Alves de Lima e Silva, Duke of Caxias (1803–1880), Brazilian army officer and politician
- Robert William Wilcox (1855–1903), Hawaiian revolutionary soldier and politician
- William Mark Duke (1879–1971), Archbishop of Vancouver
- Beltrán Alfonso Osorio, 18th duke of Alburquerque (1918–1994), Spanish noble and amateur jockey
- John F. Thompson (politician) (1920–1965), U.S. politician
- George Deukmejian (1928–2018), Governor of California
- Irvin Khoza (born 1948), South African football administrator

== Ships ==
- HMS Iron Duke, any of several British Royal Navy ships
- HMS Iron Duke (1870), a battleship sold for scrap in 1906
- HMS Iron Duke (1912), the fleet flagship at the Battle of Jutland
- HMS Iron Duke (F234), a Type 23 frigate launched in 1991

== Trains ==
- GWR Iron Duke Class, a class of locomotive built by the Great Western Railway in England
- Iron Duke, a GWR 3031 Class locomotive built in 1892
- BR Standard Class 7 Iron Duke number 70014 built in 1951
- British Rail Class 87 Iron Duke number 87017 built in 1974

== Other uses ==
- Iron Duke engine, a 2.5 L I4 piston engine made by General Motors
- Iron Duke (pub), public house in Great Yarmouth, England
- The Iron Duke (film), 1934 film starring George Arliss
- The Iron Duke (novel), by L. Ron Hubbard
- The Iron Dukes, the name the 2nd Battalion 37th Armored Regiment
- 1938 Duke Blue Devils football team, nicknamed the "Iron Dukes"
- Iron Duke, a large iron ore mine in South Australia

== See also ==
- Iron Baron (disambiguation)
- Iron Lady (disambiguation)
- Iron Lord (disambiguation)
- Iron Man (disambiguation)
- Iron Marshal (disambiguation)
- Iron Woman (disambiguation)
