= Krasnaya Zvezda =

Official newspaper of the Soviet and later the Russian Ministry of Defence

Красная звезда Krasnaya zvezda

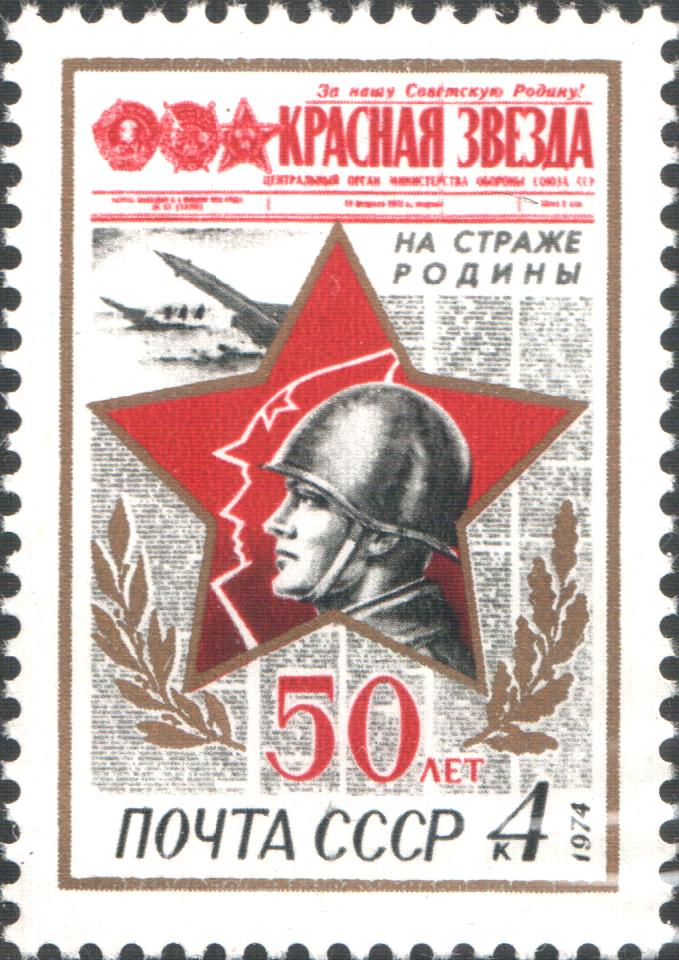
- 1974 Soviet postage stamp depicting an issue of Krasnaya zvezda
- Type: Periodical
- Format: A2
- Owner: Armed Forces of the Russian Federation
- Publisher: JSC Krasnaya Zvezda
- Founded: 1 January 1924; 102 years ago
- Language: Russian
- Website: redstar.ru

Krasnaya Zvezda (Russian: Кра́сная звезда́, literally "Red Star") is the official newspaper of the Russian Armed Forces. It was the official newspaper of the Ministry of Defence of the Soviet Union (and its predecessors) from 1923 to 1991, and the Ministry of Defence of Russia from 1992 until 2018.

Krasnaya Zvezda was created by the decision of the Politburo of the Central Committee of the Russian Communist Party (Bolsheviks) on 29 November 1923, as the central printing body of the People's Commissariat for Military and Naval Affairs, the predecessor of the Ministry of Defense of the Soviet Union and therefore the Ministry of Defence of Russia. The first issue was published on 1 January 1924. It was the central organ of the Soviet Armed Forces for decades, and survived the dissolution of the Soviet Union.

Krasnaya Zvezda was best known outside of the Soviet Union for coining the nickname "Iron Lady" for then-British Conservative Party leader and future British Prime Minister Margaret Thatcher. The 24 January 1976 issue featured an article about Thatcher written by Yuri Gavrilov with the headline "Iron Lady Raises Fears" in reference to her strongly anti-communist and anti-Soviet speech Britain Awake. Thatcher and her supporters would embrace the epithet, which came to symbolise her personality and style of politics.

On 1 January 2018, Krasnaya Zvezda was transferred to a new publishing house based in Moscow operated by the Russian Armed Forces. It is currently published in Moscow, Saint Petersburg, Khabarovsk, and Simferopol.
