= Metropolitan Borough of Chelsea =

Former borough of London

Coordinates: 51.4874°N 0.1682°W

Chelsea
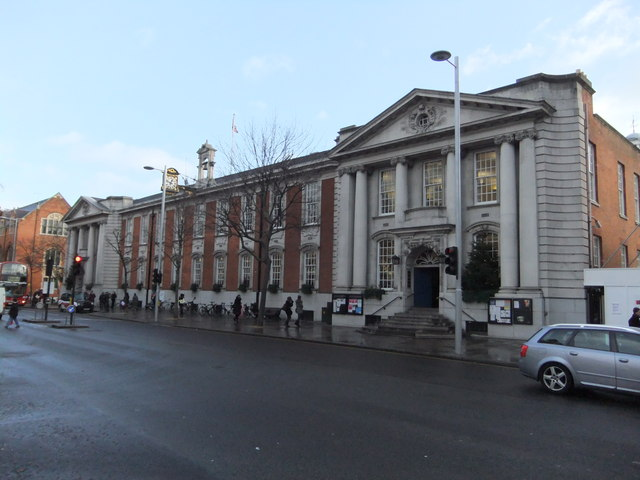
- Chelsea Town Hall in King's Road, London

- Chelsea within the County of London
- History
  - Origin: Chelsea parish
  - Created: 1900
  - Abolished: 1965
  - Succeeded by: Royal Borough of Kensington and Chelsea
- Status: Metropolitan borough, civil parish
- Government: Chelsea Borough Council
  - HQ: King's Road
  - Motto: Nisi Dominus Frustra (Unless God be with us all will be in vain)
- Coat of arms of the borough council
- Map of borough boundary

The Metropolitan Borough of Chelsea was a civil parish and metropolitan borough of the County of London between 1900 and 1965. It was created by the London Government Act 1899 from most of the ancient parish of Chelsea. Following the London Government Act 1963, it was amalgamated with the Royal Borough of Kensington in 1965 to form the Royal Borough of Kensington and Chelsea.

== Ancient parish ==
The ancient parish of Chelsea included the Kensal Town exclave, approximately 3.5 miles (5.6 km) northwest of the main riverside territory.

== Ecclesiastical parish ==
The ancient parish was originally dedicated to All Saints, but by the late 17th century it had been rededicated to St Luke. It was in the Diocese of London. In 1824 a new parish church was built in the centre of the parish, it was also dedicated to St Luke and the original parish church became a chapel-at-ease known as All Saints, Chelsea or Chelsea Old Church. From 1831, as the population of Chelsea increased, a number of new parishes were formed:

- Holy Trinity, Upper Chelsea in 1831
- St Saviour, Upper Chelsea in 1840
- St Jude, Upper Chelsea in 1844, (merged into Holy Trinity, Upper Chelsea in 1892)
- All Saints, Chelsea (Chelsea Old Church) voluntarily took care of certain streets from 1855, became a separate parish in 1951
- Park Chapel, Chelsea Park in c.1855, (renamed Emmanuel, Chelsea Park in 1906; then St Andrew, Chelsea Park in 1912)
- St Simon Zelotes, Upper Chelsea in 1859
- Christ Church, Chelsea in 1860
- St John, Chelsea World's End in 1877

In the detached part of Chelsea parish, around the hamlet of Kensal Green (Kensal Town), a number of new parishes were also formed:

- St John the Evangelist, Kensal Green in 1845 with parts of Kensington, Paddington, Hammersmith and Willesden
- St Luke the Evangelist, Kensal Green in 1877 with parts of Holy Trinity, Kilburn
- St Jude, Kensal Green in 1879

== Population and area ==
The area of the borough was 660 acres (2.7 km^{2}), once Kensal Town was transferred to Kensington and Paddington. The borough's only railway station was Chelsea & Fulham, on the West London Line, which closed in 1940. The borough's only tube station was Sloane Square.

The population recorded in the Census was:

Chelsea Vestry 1801–1899

Year	1801	1811	1821	1831	1841	1851	1861	1871	1881	1891
Population	11,604	18,262	26,860	32,371	39,796	56,185	59,881	67,717	73,079	74,466

Metropolitan Borough 1900–1961

Year	1901	1911	1921	1931	1941	1951	1961
Population	73,842	66,385	63,697	59,031		50,957	47,256

== Coat of arms ==
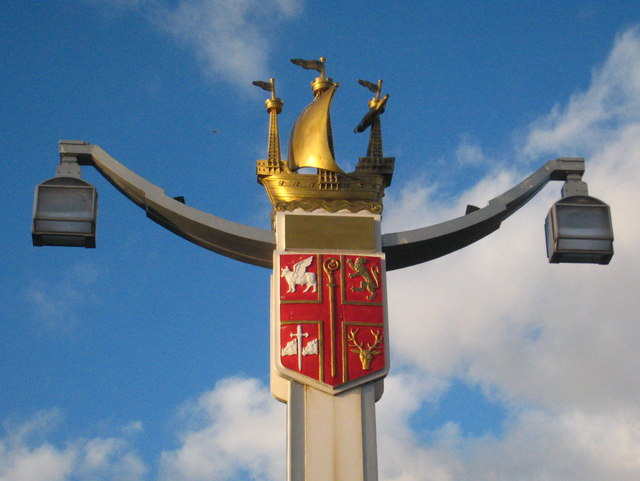
The arms of the Metropolitan Borough of Chelsea on a lamp post on Chelsea Bridge

The borough was granted a coat of arms by the College of Arms on 28 February 1903. The blazon was:

Gules within a cross voided or a crozier in pale of the last in the first quarter a winged bull statant in the second a lion rampant reguardant both argent in the third a sword point downwards proper pomel and hilt gold between two boars' heads couped at the neck of the third and in the fourth a stag's head caboshed of the second.

The winged bull is the symbol of St Luke, patron saint of Chelsea (St Luke's parish church is just off the King's Road). The other emblems referred to various holders of the manor over the centuries: the crozier for Westminster Abbey, the lion for Earl Cadogan (first mayor of the borough), the boars' heads and sword for the Sloane family and the stag's head for the Stanley family.

The motto was Nisi dominus frustra or "It is vain without the Lord".

The fourfold division of the shield was a design favoured by Albert Woods, Garter King of Arms for municipal grants: other examples in London included those of the metropolitan boroughs of Bermondsey, Camberwell, Islington, Kensington and Southwark.

The arms can still be seen, in full colour (but without the motto), on a lamp post on Chelsea Bridge. Another bears the arms of the former Borough of Battersea, at the bridge's other end.

== Politics ==
A map showing the wards of Chelsea Metropolitan Borough as they appeared in 1916.

Under the Metropolis Management Act 1855 any parish that exceeded 2,000 ratepayers was to be divided into wards; as such the incorporated vestry of St Luke Chelsea was divided into four wards (electing vestrymen): No. 1 or Stanley (9), No. 2 or Church (18), No. 3 or Hans Town (21) and No. 4 or Royal Hospital (12).

In 1894 as its population had increased the incorporated vestry was re-divided into five wards (electing vestrymen): Stanley (12), Church & Cheyne (15), Hans Town (12), Royal Hospital (9) and Kensal Town (12).

The metropolitan borough was also divided into five wards for elections: Cheyne, Church, Hans Town, Royal Hospital and Stanley.

=== Borough council ===
The borough council was controlled by the Municipal Reform Party, which was allied to the Conservative Party, from its creation until 1949. In that year, the "Municipal Reform" label was discarded, and the Conservative party governed the borough until the borough's abolition in 1965. Chelsea Town Hall, a neo-classical building containing frescos, remains in use. It is situated on King's Road, at the corner of Chelsea Manor Street.

=== Parliament constituency ===
For elections to parliament, the borough formed a single constituency. By 1950, the decline in population meant that the Chelsea constituency also included the Brompton area of the Metropolitan Borough of Kensington.
