= Steel worker (disambiguation) =

A steel worker is any person who works in the process of making steel.

Steel worker may also refer to:

- A member of the United Steelworkers
- Steelworker (United States Navy), United States Navy occupational rating, working with steel
- Steel Worker, a 1980 video game developed and published by Taito

== See also ==
- Steeler (disambiguation)
- Steelers (disambiguation)
- Steelman (disambiguation)
- Worker (disambiguation)
- Steel (disambiguation)
