= Bill George (dog dealer) =

Dog dealer in England

Bill George (c. 1802–1881) was a Victorian era dog dealer and well-known character in London, England.

Mr. Punch visits Bill George at Canine Castle.

== Early life ==
George's first job was as a butcher's boy. A bareknuckle prizefighter, he later became an apprentice to Ben White of 'May Tree Cottage', Kensal New Town, a dealer of Old English Bulldogs, the ancestral breed of Bulldog used for dog fighting and bull-baiting. Kensal New Town was a rough working class area with many Irish immigrants and the scene of Protestant-Catholic conflicts. He was indirectly part of an incident in 1825, sponsored by Sam Wedgbury, who had bought a dog from White, and a menagerie owner called George Wombwell, involving lion-baiting by Bulldogs. George is said to have unsuccessfully attempted to dissuade the participants from continuing in this bloody enterprise. The outcome was that one of the lions was injured and several dogs were killed, leading to public outrage and a local ordinance banning the use of dogs for fighting. The practice continued in secret, however, and White's kennels remained in operation, with George continuing to work for him.

== Canine Castle ==
In 1835, Parliament passed the Cruelty to Animals Act, banning dog fighting nationwide. In that same year, Ben White died, and George purchased the premises from his widow, renaming them 'Canine Castle'. Aware that for the business to continue, a new clientele would have to be cultivated, George shifted the focus onto the Bulldog as a companion animal, giving the breed a fresh impetus. He also developed a new line of "Toy Bulldogs" which became a craze in France where he sent many specimens who are believed to have been major contributors to a new breed, the French Bulldog. The magazine Country Life, on 29 April 1899 recounts:

"Some five-and-thirty years ago in fact, [i.e. about 1865], the small-sized or light-weight Bulldog was common in this country; so much so that dogs of the breed that scaled over 28 lbs were not encouraged at such shows as Birmingham, which was at that period the most important exhibition of its kind in England. Then by some freak of fashion the Toy Bulldog became all the rage in Paris, with the result that the celebrated Bill George, of Canine Castle, Kensal New Town, the most eminent dog dealer of his or any other day, received carte blanche commissions from French customers to procure them light-weight Bulldogs, and by this means England was denuded of all the best specimens."

In 1840, George imported a Spanish Bulldog, a larger breed used for bull baiting in Spain. He was brindle pied, and known as "Big Headed Billy". George's famous white dog Dan, which weighed 65 lbs, and was sold for the extraordinary sum of £100, was a grandson of Big Headed Billy. George was apparently breeding Bulldogs in three sizes.

Earlier than that, he had begun to branch out into Mastiffs, selling John Wigglesworth Thompson the brindle bitch Juno, who would be the foundation of his line. Thompson would later make him a gift of a young dog called Tiger, generally known as George's Tiger, who would become an important stud dog. George also provided both the foundation animals, Adam (bought by George at Tattersalls) and Eve (bought by George at Leadenhall Market), for Captain Garnier. (Adam was reputed to be one of the Lyme Hall mastiffs, from the region of Forest of Lyme, Cheshire. This was the line established by Sir Piers Legh from the bitch that protected him at the Battle of Agincourt.) Adam and Eve's descendant Governor was perhaps the most famous Mastiff in the beginning of the dog show era.

== Recognition During His Lifetime ==
George's celebrity status is confirmed by his appearance in the Punch magazine cartoon shown above. He even claimed to have received visits from foreign royalty. Apparently Charles Dickens paid him visits when researching Bill Sikes’ dog, Bull’s Eye (portrayed by illustrator Fred Barnard as a Bulldog) in Oliver Twist (1837-39).

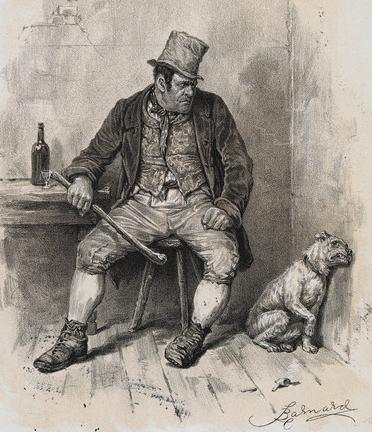
Bill Sikes and Bull's Eye

He was proud that a letter sent to "Bill George, Devil’s Castle, Bloodhound Corner, Tyke Lane, London" reached him, but disappointed when one sent to "Mr. Bill George, Dog Fancier, London" was returned to the sender. He is said to have asked the name of the Postmaster General, and, when told it was Lord John Manners, replied, "Tell those fools in the Post Office that if his Lordship don’t know me, I don’t know manners".

== Posthumous recognition ==
Bill George died on 4 June 1884 in Kensal New Town, and was buried in Kensal Green Cemetery; he left an estate valued at £89 2s., with one "Mary Hurd, of Canine Castle, Kensal New Town, spinster", as his sole executor.

The Kennel Chronicle twice featured George after his death. On the first occasion his obituary said, "Bill George ... died recently. He was a character in his day and generation. He is described by one who knew him as a sturdy, straightforward, honest dealing man, and known to be trustworthy by all who came in contact with him. Bill George remained an honourable man in a business which abounded with temptations." In 1884 the publication made this appeal, "During the last few years of his life, Bill George was jilted to some extent by Dame Fortune, and hence his widow, who is paralysed, is totally unprovided for, and has no resources. A subscription list has been drawn up, and the Editor of Sporting Life will receive contributions". Mary George died in August 1895, and was buried with her husband.
