= Superman: The Man of Steel (disambiguation) =

Superman: The Man of Steel is an American comic book ongoing series.

Superman: The Man of Steel may also refer to:

- Superman: The Man of Steel (1989 video game), a video game developed by Tynesoft
- Superman: The Man of Steel (1993 video game), a video game developed by Graftgold
- Superman: The Man of Steel (2002 video game), a video game developed by Circus Freak
- The Man of Steel (comics), an American comic book limited series
- Superman: Man of Steel (2004), an unmade proposed film also called "Superman: Flyby"
- Man of Steel (film), a 2013 American film, part of the DCEU
- Superman (character), a comic book character from DC Comics

== See also ==
- Man of Steel (disambiguation)
- Superman (disambiguation)
