= Iron Throne =

Iron Throne may refer to:

- Iron Throne (A Song of Ice and Fire), the throne of the fictional monarchy of Westeros in the A Song of Ice and Fire novels and a metonym for the monarchy itself
- "The Iron Throne" (Game of Thrones), the final episode of Game of Thrones, the TV adaptation of A Song of Ice and Fire
- The Iron Throne (novel), a fantasy novel by Simon Hawke, set in the world of the Birthright setting of Dungeons & Dragons
- The Iron Throne (Forgotten Realms), a fictional organization in the Forgotten Realms setting of Dungeons & Dragons

== See also ==
- György Dózsa on the iron throne, the 1514 execution of a Hungarian revolutionary
- Iron Crown (disambiguation)
- Iron Lady (disambiguation)
- Iron Lord (disambiguation)
