= Man of Iron (disambiguation) =

Man of Iron (Polish: Człowiek z żelaza) is a 1981 Polish film.

Man of Iron, Men of Iron, or variation, may refer to:

- Sailors of the Age of Sail, with "ships of wood and men of iron"
- Men of Iron, a 1891 novel by Howard Pyle
- The Man of Iron, a 1915 novel by Richard Dehan
- The Man of Iron, a Nick Carter novel
- Man of Iron (2009 film), a Chinese film
- Man of Iron (1972 film), a Hong Kong film
- Man of Iron (1935 film), an American film
- A Man of Iron, a 1925 U.S. film
- Man of Iron (horse) (born 2006), a U.S. racehorse
- Steel (John Henry Irons), a DC Comics character given the moniker "Man of Iron"
- Overman, an alternative version of Superman given the moniker "Man of Iron"
- Man of Iron: Thomas Telford and the Building of Britain, a 2017 non-fiction book by Julian Glover

== See also ==
- "Little Men of Iron", the 1902 Stanley Cup winning team of the Montreal Hockey Club
- Man of Steel (disambiguation)
- Iron Man (disambiguation)
- Iron (disambiguation)
- Man (disambiguation)
