= Man of Steel =

Man of Steel may refer to:

== Comics ==
- Superman, a DC Comics superhero nicknamed "Man of Steel"
- The Man of Steel (comics), a 1986 American comic book limited series written by John Byrne and drawn by Dick Giordano
- Superman: The Man of Steel, a 1991–2003 American comic book ongoing series written by Mark Schultz and drawn Louise Simonson
- "The Man of Steal", a 1998 Marvel Comics comic book story arc written by Fabian Nicieza and drawn by Steve Skroce

== Film and television ==
- The Man of Steel (1922 film), a 1922 German film
- "Man of Steel," a chapter of the 1948 Superman serial
- Man of Steel (film), a 2013 American film
- "Man of Steel" (Supergirl), an episode of Supergirl
- "Man of Steel" (Superman & Lois), an episode of Superman & Lois

== Music ==
- Man of Steel (album), a 1983 album by Hank Williams, Jr.
  - "Man of Steel" (Hank Williams Jr. song), 1984
- "Man of Steel" (Meat Loaf song), a 2003 song by Meat Loaf
- Man of Steel (soundtrack), the soundtrack album for the 2013 film

== People ==
- Joseph Stalin (1878–1953), Soviet politician and revolutionary whose nom de guerre (Stalin) is often translated as "Man of Steel"

== Other uses ==
- Man of Steel (musical), a 1978 musical by Ian Dorricott
- Man of Steel Awards, a British rugby league award
- The Steel Man, formerly named Man of Steel, a 2012 sculpture by Steve Mehdi

== See also ==
- Made of Steel (disambiguation)
- "Man of Steel, Woman of Kleenex", a 1969 essay by Larry Niven
- Rickey Henderson, baseball player, nicknamed "Man of Steal"
- Woman of Steel (disambiguation)
- Men of Steel (disambiguation)
- Man of Iron (disambiguation)
- Steelman (disambiguation)
- Superman (disambiguation)
- Superman: The Man of Steel (disambiguation)
