= Iron Crown (disambiguation) =

The Iron Crown is part of the regalia of the Kingdom of Italy.

Iron Crown may also refer to:

- Order of the Iron Crown (Kingdom of Italy), an order associated with the Iron Crown of Lombardy
- Order of the Iron Crown (Austria), an order of merit of Austria and Austria-Hungary until 1918

== Entertainment ==
- "Kanawa" ("鉄輪" "The Iron Crown"), a Japanese Noh play
- Iron Crown Enterprises, a roleplaying game publisher
- Iron Crown (Pokémon), a fictional species of Pokémon

=== Film ===
- The Iron Crown (Italian: La corona di ferro), 1941 Italian adventure film
- Kanawa (鉄輪, The Iron Crown), 1972 Japanese horror film, based on the Noh play of the same name
- Mythica: The Iron Crown, 2016 American fantasy film

== Other uses ==
- SS Iron Crown, Australian iron ore carrier sunk in WWII
- Iron Crown Airport (FAA id: 22OR), Marion County, Oregon, USA
- King of the Lombards, from his crown, the Iron Crown

== See also ==
- Iron Throne (disambiguation)
- Iron Lord (disambiguation)
- Iron Lady (disambiguation)
