= Nicholas Freeman =

British politician

Nicholas Hall Freeman (25 July 1939 – 11 November 1989), OBE (1985) was the Conservative Party leader of the London Royal Borough of Kensington and Chelsea Council in the United Kingdom from 1977 until 1989; he was also its mayor in 1988.

He was educated at Stoneygate School, Leicester, and King's School, Canterbury, and admitted a solicitor in 1962. In 1968 he was called to the Bar by the Middle Temple, and practised thereafter at the Criminal Bar. He was appointed a Recorder in 1985.

Living in Harrington Gardens, South Kensington, he became Chairman of the Courtfield Ward Committee of the Chelsea Conservative Association, which gave him a position on the association's Executive Committee. A fine speaker with a powerful personality and strong political ambitions, Freeman was elected to Chelsea Borough Council in 1968. He became Chairman of the Borough Planning Committee shortly after being elected to the council, and made a particular effort to clear up what he called "the sore thumb in the Royal Borough", the sometimes seedy area around Earls Court Underground Station.

He stood as the Conservative Party candidate for Hartlepool in both the February 1974 and October 1974 general elections, and when Sir Brandon Rhys Williams, Conservative Member of Parliament for Kensington, died suddenly in 1988, Freeman had high hopes of succeeding him. He failed to secure a nomination, which was no doubt partly explained by a number of previous controversies: the Old Town Hall crisis and his virulent opposition to the Community Charge (also called the "poll tax").

Nicholas Freeman had long been a controversial figure: in 1982 he had provoked a storm of opposition amongst people of all political persuasions by using his powers as council leader, without consulting colleagues, to order the overnight destruction of Kensington's fine century-old Italianate Town Hall on Kensington High Street. The building was due to be given special Listed Status on the Monday, but at 3 a.m. on the day before the façade was smashed to pieces by demolition experts. The Royal Fine Art Commission condemned the action as "official vandalism... decided upon covertly, implemented without warning and timed deliberately to thwart known opposition".

At constituency level also he met outspoken opposition, particularly from Conservative Monday Club activist Gregory Lauder-Frost, his Ward Committee Secretary and also a member of the Chelsea Association's Executive. Lauder-Frost left the Ward Committee, and when he was nominated to stand as a local councillor for the North Stanley Ward, Freeman spoke strongly against him at the selection meeting. Lauder-Frost was, as a result, not selected.

Freeman remained unrepentant, arguing that by selling off the old town hall site for development the council would be able to build a more efficient and economically run town hall around the corner. Freeman was particularly criticised for failing to find an alternative use for the building. He survived the storm, doubtless helped by the fact that he dominated the council to a degree unusual among municipal leaders, but there was little comfort for the ratepayers: the cost of the new town hall far exceeded his original estimates.

Freeman had also came under a lot of criticism for taking little real interest in North Kensington, where poverty and racial tension contrasted uneasily with areas of immense wealth. He vigorously implemented the Conservative government's curbs on local authority spending and was able to claim that his council had the smallest staff per head of population of any British borough. It was also the first London borough to hand over some of the responsibility for rubbish collection to private enterprise.

In addition, Freeman was a member of the influential Conservative Central Office Policy Group for London which paved the way for the abolition of the Labour-controlled Greater London Council.

His rejection in 1988 as Conservative Party candidate for Kensington was a bitter disappointment which, he felt, ended his hopes of ever reaching Westminster. Freeman was elected Mayor of the Royal Borough of Kensington and Chelsea in 1988, resigned as Leader of the council the next year, and announced his intention of retiring from the council altogether with effect from 1990. Colleagues were surprised at his decision, for the borough seemed to be Freeman's whole life. He spent almost every evening at the town hall either doing council business or entertaining in his room. He never married.
