= Executive (novel) =

1985 novel by Piers Anthony

Executive is a novel by Piers Anthony published in 1985.

== Plot summary ==
Executive is a novel in which Hope Hubris is the liberal Tyrant in control of Jupiter.

== Reception ==
Dave Langford reviewed Executive for White Dwarf #82, and stated that "The allegory can get wearying: this is presumably why the book is pepped up with massive doses of the weird exercise (combined arm-wrestling, origami and dialectical analysis) which is the author's version of sex."

== Reviews ==
- Review by Michael R. Collings (1986) in Fantasy Review, January 1986
- Review by Andy Sawyer (1986) in Paperback Inferno, #59
- Review by Andy Sawyer (1986) in Paperback Inferno, #62
