= Statesman (novel) =

1986 novel by Piers Anthony

Statesman is a novel by Piers Anthony published in 1986.

== Plot summary ==
Statesman is a novel in which Hope Hubris offers liberal solutions to the political problems of the world.

== Reception ==
Dave Langford reviewed Statesman for White Dwarf #96, and stated that "It's the execution which is dire, with its humourless efforts to characterise all women by their performance in bed with hero Hope Hubris, and the extremely ad-hoc nature of the solutions."

== Reviews ==
- Review by Anthony Low (1987) in Fantasy Review, March 1987
- Review by L. J. Hurst (1987) in Paperback Inferno, #65
- Review by Andy Sawyer (1987) in Paperback Inferno, #69
