= Britain Awake =

1976 speech by Margaret Thatcher

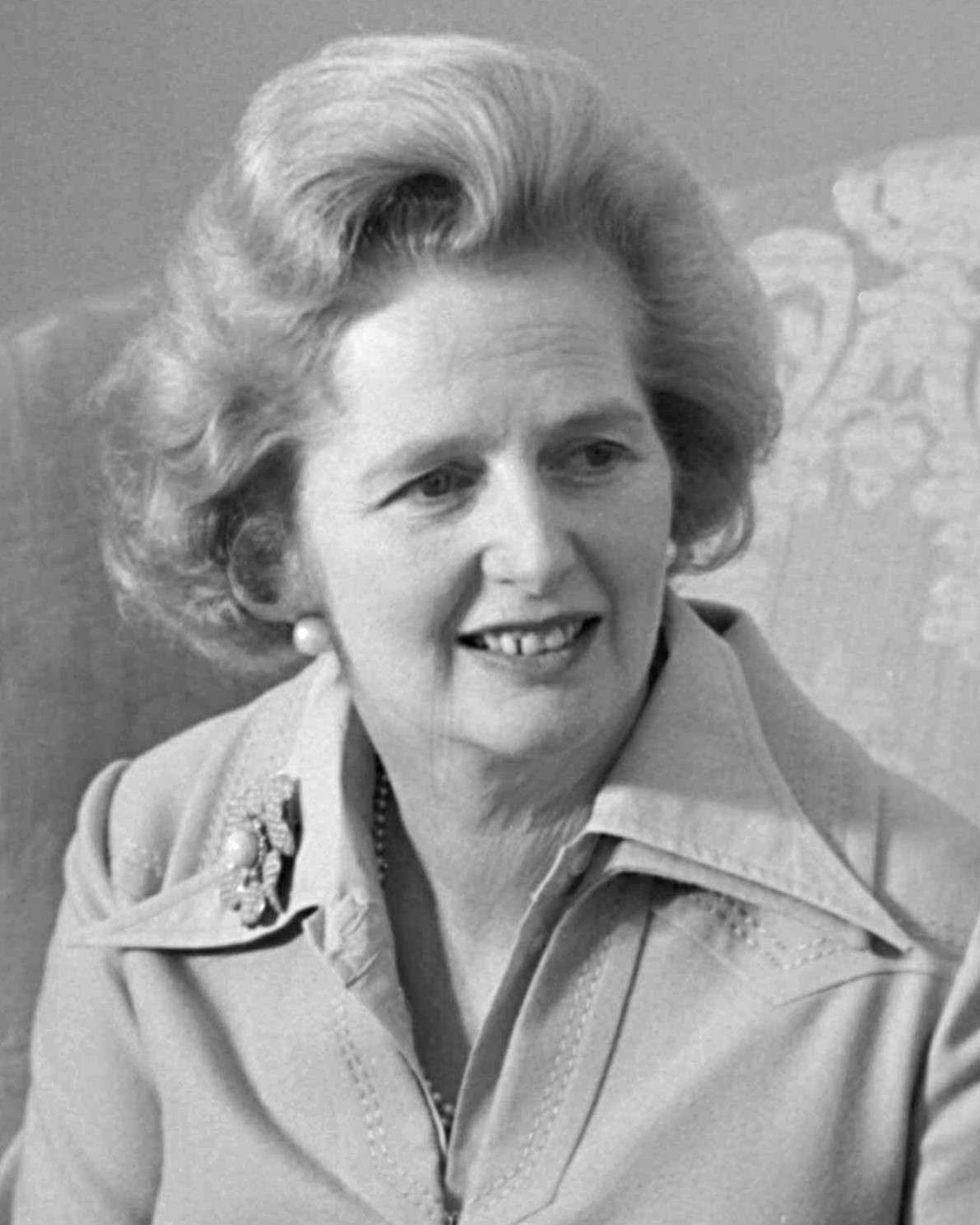
Thatcher in 1975

"Britain Awake" (also known as the Iron Lady speech) was a speech made by British Conservative Party leader Margaret Thatcher at Kensington Town Hall, London, on 19 January 1976. The speech was strongly anti-Soviet, with Thatcher stating that the Soviet Union was "bent on world domination" and taking advantage of détente to make gains in the Angolan Civil War. She questioned the British Labour government's defence cuts and the state of the NATO defences in parts of Europe. Thatcher stated that a Conservative government would align its foreign policy with the United States and increase defence spending. She also congratulated Malcolm Fraser and Robert Muldoon for their recent election as prime minister of Australia and New Zealand, respectively, but warned of the risks of a potential communist victory in the upcoming 1976 Italian general election. Thatcher urged the British public to wake from "a long sleep" and make a choice that "will determine the life or death of our kind of society".

The speech was reported on in the Soviet press, including by Yuri Gavrilov in the Krasnaya Zvezda who dubbed Thatcher the "Iron Lady", a term also used afterwards by the news agency TASS. The Soviet reporting, including the nickname, was discussed in a Reuters story that Western outlets picked up. The British press adopted the term as a mark of the strength of Thatcher's anti-communist stance, and she approved of its use.

== Background ==
Thatcher had been a Conservative Party member of Parliament since 1959 and had served as Secretary of State for Education and Science in Edward Heath's government. After Heath lost the February and October 1974 general elections, Thatcher challenged him for the leadership of the party. Her policy positions, including her support for economic liberalism, won her the backing of the party's right wing. She was elected party leader in February 1975, becoming Leader of the Opposition.

Foreign relations in this period were dominated by the Cold War, a confrontation between the West and the Soviet Union (USSR) and its allies. By 1975 détente, a period of supposedly more friendly relations between the superpowers, was the principal position. At the time, some considered that détente could lead to the end of the Cold War. Thatcher had made few speeches on foreign policy by 1975. However, it was known that she was sceptical of Soviet intentions to keep the terms of the 1975 Helsinki Accords, a move towards more extensive détente.

In September 1975, Thatcher carried out a tour of the United States and Canada, meeting with senior figures such as UN secretary-general Kurt Waldheim and US president Gerald Ford. During this tour, she met US defence secretary James R. Schlesinger, a noted opponent of détente, and Treasury secretary William E. Simon, a prominent economic liberalist. During the tour, she made a speech at the Washington Press Club setting out her commitment to roll back socialism in Britain and rejuvenate the country through economic liberalism. She mentioned her views on détente and cautioned about the risks of such a strategy. Still, the main focus was on her proposed domestic reforms and Britain's continuing relationship with the US.

Thatcher's appearances in this period were managed by her public relations adviser Gordon Reece. On 19 January 1976 she was due to make a speech at Kensington Town Hall in London, one of her first major speeches as party leader.

== Speech ==
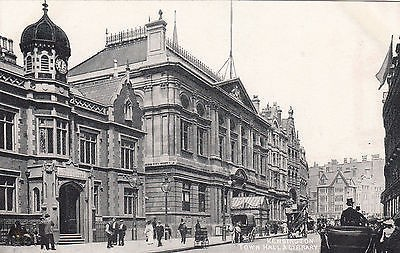
Old Town Hall, Kensington; it would be controversially demolished in 1982 after the construction of a new Brutalist-style town hall.

Thatcher made the speech on the evening of 19 January 1976. The address had been written beforehand, and a copy given to the press with an embargo of 8 pm. A comparison between the press release and the speech as made reveals few differences, and those of a mainly stylistic nature.

Thatcher opened the speech by stating that the first duty of any government was to defend its people from external threats and asked rhetorically if the current Labour government was doing so. She accused prime minister Harold Wilson of cutting defence budgets at a time when the government faced its greatest external threat since the Second World War, that of the Soviet Union. Thatcher accused some members of the Labour Party of siding with the Soviets, who she stated was a dictatorship intent on becoming the leading military power in the world and "bent on world domination". Thatcher noted that as a dictatorship, "the men in the Soviet politburo don't have to worry about the ebb and flow of public opinion. They put guns before butter, while we put just about everything before guns".

Thatcher stated that as the Soviet Union had failed in economic and human terms, its only recourse to become a superpower was military means. She stated that she had warned the world before Helskini that the USSR was outspending the US in military research, weaponry, ships and strategic nuclear weapons and that some experts considered that the USSR had achieved strategic superiority over the US. Thatcher noted that she would attend British Army wargames in Germany in three days at a point when the USSR had an advantage of 150,000 men, 10,000 tanks and 2,600 aircraft over NATO in Europe. Thatcher raised concerns over the strength of NATO defences in Southern Europe, the Mediterranean, oil rigs and sea trade routes. She lamented the loss of British naval bases overseas when the USSR was constructing new bases.

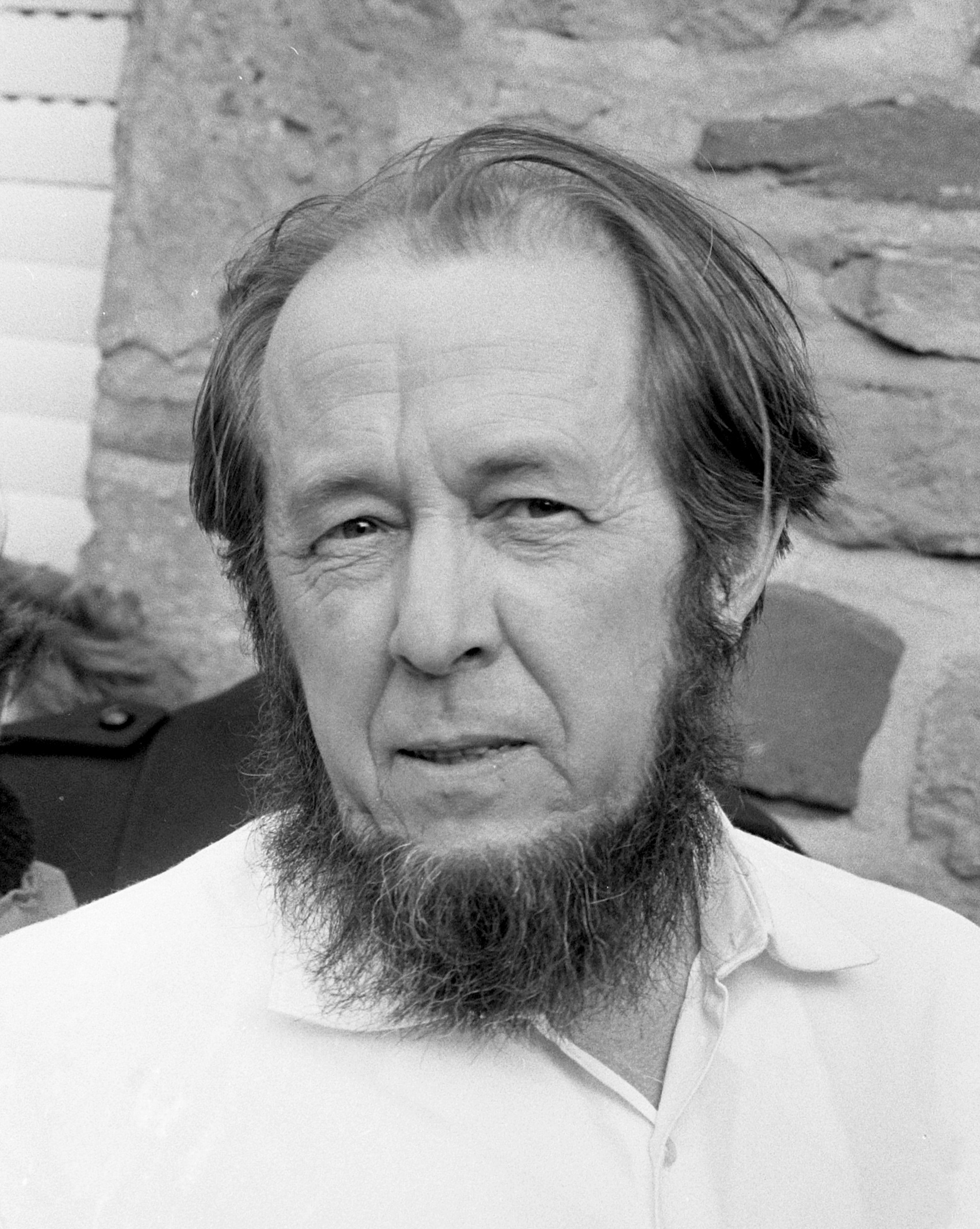
Thatcher referred to the writings of Aleksandr Solzhenitsyn (pictured in 1974)

Thatcher criticised détente as providing only an illusion of safety and noted that it had not prevented Soviet intervention in the Angolan Civil War or led to an improvement in living conditions behind the Iron Curtain. She referred to the writings of Soviet dissident Aleksandr Solzhenitsyn who had described the Cold War as the Third World War and noted that in recent years it was a war the West was losing, with more countries turning to socialism. Thatcher referred to contemporary writings by Soviet political writer Konstantin Zarodov and general secretary Leonid Brezhnev advocating bringing about a proletarian revolution across the world. Thatcher stated that if it did not act, Britain might find itself upon "the scrap heap of history".

Thatcher warned that all NATO members must share the burden of defence, especially as the US had restricted its foreign involvements after their defeat in the Vietnam War. She referred to cuts in defence spending of almost £5 billion, announced by Labour, and stated that the Secretary of State for Defence, Roy Mason, should be known instead as the "Secretary for Insecurity". Thatcher stated that "the longer Labour remains in Government, the more vulnerable this country will be", which received applause from the audience. She compared British defence spending, around £90 per head per year, unfavourably with that of West Germany (£130), France (£115), the US (£215) and neutral Sweden (£160). She urged that this be increased, even though "we are poorer than most of our NATO allies. This is part of the disastrous economic legacy of Socialism".

Thatcher noted that Britain's reputation abroad had declined, stating that "as I travel the world, I find people asking again and again, 'What has happened to Britain?' They want to know why we are hiding our heads in the sand, why with all our experience, we are not giving a lead". She warned that the Soviet-backed MPLA was making rapid gains in Angola and warned of a domino effect for other countries in Africa if Angola was lost. A loss would also make it difficult to resolve the matter of independent, white-led Rhodesia (which was fighting the Rhodesian Bush War against communist-supported black nationalists) and South African apartheid.

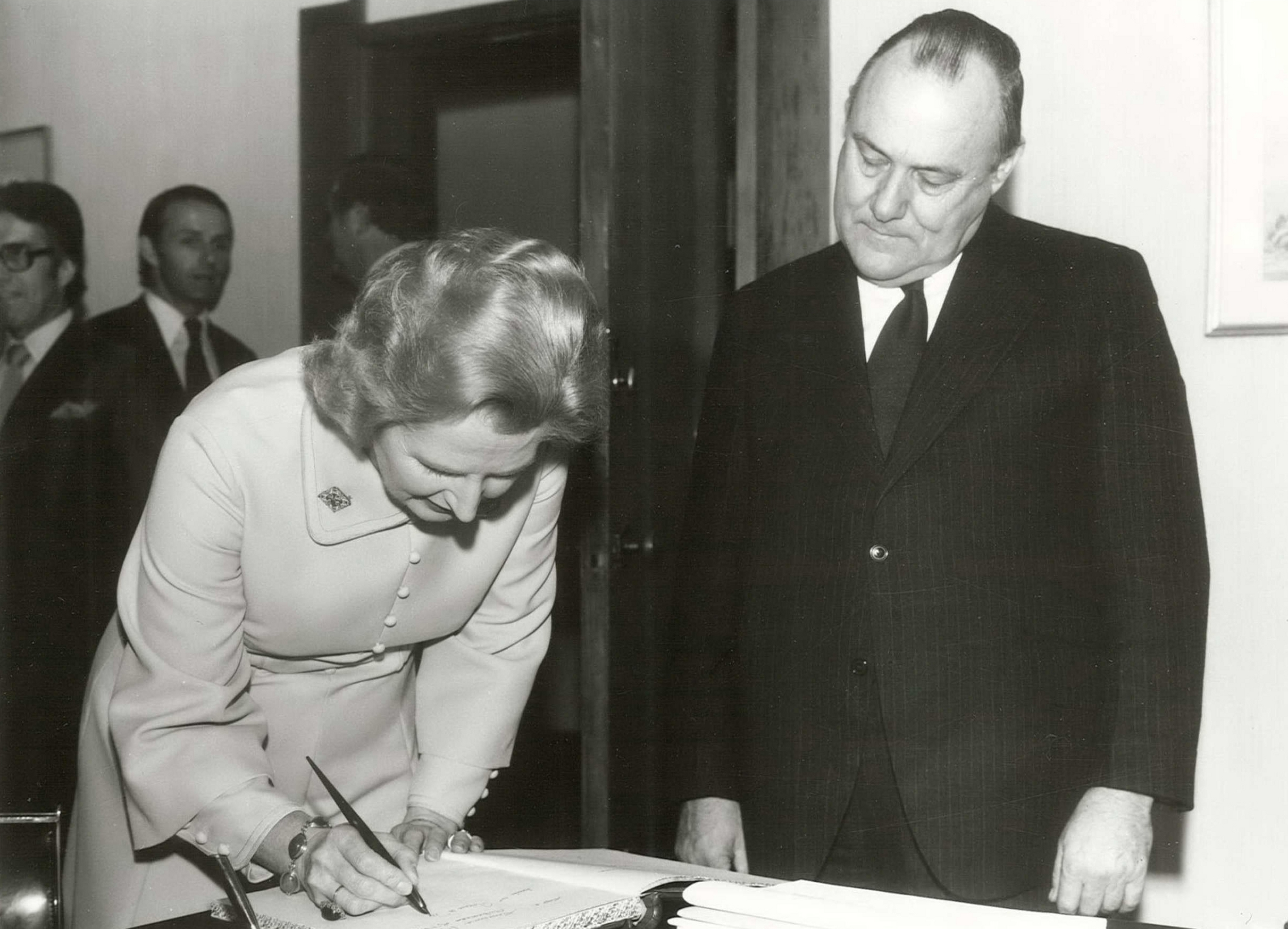
Thatcher and prime minister Robert Muldoon met in Wellington, New Zealand, in September 1976

Thatcher committed her party to follow a foreign policy closely aligned with the US and called for closer ties with European states and the Commonwealth nations of Australia, New Zealand and Canada. She congratulated Australian prime minister Malcolm Fraser on his November 1975 election and New Zealand prime minister Robert Muldoon on his election in December; both men had beaten socialist opponents. Thatcher called for Britain to provide "a reasoned and vigorous defence of the Western concept of rights and liberties" and referred to recent speeches on this theme by the US ambassador to the UN, Daniel Patrick Moynihan.

Thatcher referred to Britain's position in the European Economic Community (EEC) and called for members to maintain strong national identities and to resist any move toward closer union. She warned of the threat of a communist victory in the Italian general election, in a "difficult year ahead" (there were concerns at this time over a resurgence in Eurocommunism and real chances for a communist victory in the Italian election and the Portuguese legislative election). She called for closer cooperation between the police and security services of the EEC and NATO nations and commended the British police for their response to recent terrorist incidents (this included gun and bomb attacks in London as part of the Provisional IRA campaign and the capture of four IRA members in the 1975 Balcombe Street siege). At this point Thatcher skipped several pages of her written speech, at the moment she had designated for the purpose in case time was short. The omitted text noted that Britain's economic and military strength had been weakened under Labour's policies and noted that "Soviet military power will not disappear just because we refuse to look at it".

Thatcher concluded her speech by stating that the Conservatives believed Britain was a great country and had the "vital task of shaking the British public out of a long sleep". Her closing sentences were: "There are moments in our history when we have to make a fundamental choice. This is one such moment – a moment when our choice will determine the life or death of our kind of society, – and the future of our children. Let's ensure that our children will have cause to rejoice that we did not forsake their freedom". Part of the speech was broadcast on BBC Radio at 10 pm that night.

== Impact ==
In his biography of Thatcher, Iron Lady (2004), John Campbell considers that she made a mistake in stating in her speech that "we are fighting a major internal war against terrorism in Northern Ireland and need more troops in order to win it". British government policy, and the policy adopted by the Conservative Party when they entered government in 1979, was to consider the Northern Ireland situation as a police matter, with the army only deployed (as Operation Banner) to assist the civilian authorities. This would be the last time Thatcher would use such terminology concerning the Troubles, but it may indicate her personal thoughts on the matter. The Soviet ambassador to the United Kingdom, Nikolai Lunkov, lodged an official protest about the tone of the speech.

The Soviet press reported on the speech, with Captain Yuri Gavrilov writing an article for the 24 January edition of Krasnaya Zvezda ("Red Star"), the newspaper of the Soviet ministry of defence. Gavrilov used the headline Zheleznaya Dama Ugrozhayet ("Iron Lady Wields Threats") for the piece and claimed the term "Iron Lady" was used by Thatcher's colleagues, though it is not clear if this is true. Gavrilov may have coined the term and used it to compare Thatcher to Otto von Bismarck, the "Iron Chancellor" of imperial Germany. Gavrilov later noted that the speech marked a turning point in the Soviet Union's approach to the United Kingdom; he recalled that before the speech, Soviet cartoons portrayed Britain as a toothless lion, but afterwards they showed more respect for the nation's power. Komsomolskaya Pravda also reported on the speech and described Thatcher as a "militant amazon". Soviet news agency TASS also used the "Iron Lady" moniker.

Reuters Russian reporter Robert Evans wrote a story on the Soviet press coverage, including Gavrilov's use of the term "Iron Lady", picked up on by Western media outlets. The British press quickly adopted the term and used it as a descriptor of her tough anti-communist stance. Thatcher regarded the nickname with amusement and pride. In a speech to her constituency Conservative Association on 6 February, Thatcher adopted the nickname, stating: "Yes I am an iron lady, after all it wasn't a bad thing to be an iron duke, yes if that's how they wish to interpret my defence of values and freedoms fundamental to our way of life".

Thatcher later became prime minister of the United Kingdom after winning a decisive victory in the 1979 general election. She led a right-wing Conservative government that rolled back the extent of the state, implemented largescale privatisations and limited the power of the trade unions. She worked closely with the US president from 1981 to 1989, Ronald Reagan, to present an uncompromising stance to the Soviet Union, which remained until the reformist Mikhail Gorbachev became General Secretary of the Communist Party in 1985. Thatcher's pro-NATO stance and support for maintaining an independent nuclear deterrent stood in contrast to Labour's policies during this period. Her premiership also saw the resolution of the Rhodesia question with the formation of an independent Zimbabwe. However, she faced criticism for her refusal to support sanctions on the apartheid regime in South Africa. Thatcher resigned in 1990 after internal party conflicts over her Euroscepticism and the failed implementation of the "poll tax".
