= Politician (novel) =

1985 novel by Piers Anthony

First edition (publ. Avon Books) Cover artist: Jim Burns

Politician is a novel by Piers Anthony published in 1985.

== Plot summary ==
Politician is a novel in which Hope Hubris becomes involved in Jovian politics.

== Reception ==
Dave Langford reviewed Politician for White Dwarf #74, and stated that "Anthony [...] is handing out personal political solutions to contemporary matters, which is wearying since you're constantly translating back into twentieth-century terms. His heart's in the right place, but the ending is a cop-out, with the constitution being set aside owing to Hubris' immense popular support. Oh yeah?"

== Reviews ==
- Review by Michael R. Collings (1985) in Fantasy Review, April 1985
- Review by Andy Sawyer (1985) in Paperback Inferno, #55
- Review by Andy Sawyer (1986) in Paperback Inferno, #59
