= Mercenary (novel) =

1984 novel by Piers Anthony

First edition (publ. Avon Books) Cover artist: Jim Burns

Mercenary is a novel by Piers Anthony published in 1984.

== Plot summary ==
Mercenary is a novel in which Hope Hubris joins the Jovian Navy and becomes part of their task force to eliminate space piracy.

== Reception ==
Dave Langford reviewed Mercenary for White Dwarf #69, and stated that "Parts of this are quite sensible, but are balanced by dottiness like the space-battle which – for reasons known only to Anthony – echoes the Mongol invasion of Hungary so faithfully as to neglect the fact that space has three dimensions... Amusing nonsense, but definitely nonsense."

== Reviews ==
- Review by Mary S. Weinkauf (1984) in Fantasy Review, August 1984
- Review by Andy Sawyer (1985) in Paperback Inferno, #55
