= Refugee (Anthony novel) =

1983 novel by Piers Anthony

First US edition (publ. Avon Books) Cover artist: Jim Burns

Refugee is a novel by Piers Anthony published in 1983.

== Plot summary ==
Refugee is a novel in which Hope Hubris is raided by space pirates during an interplanetary journey.

== Reception ==
Dave Langford reviewed Refugee for White Dwarf #65, and stated that "There are exciting bits, but Anthony desperately needs editing: his verbosity stretches scenes which should be quick and brutal into reams of increasingly gratuitous violence, which ultimately put me to sleep."

== Reviews ==
- Review by John Silbersack (1984) in Heavy Metal, February 1984
- Review by Joseph Nicholas (1984) in Paperback Inferno, Volume 7, Number 5
