= The Steelers (music) =

The Steelers were an R&B/soul vocal group from Chicago active from the 1960s until the early 1980s.

The group consisted of members F. Allen, Leonard Truss, Wales Wallace, and brothers Alonzo Wells, George Wells and Wes Wells who was the lead singer. The group focused on up-tempo harmony singing.

The Steelers were formed in Chicago's West Side in 1965. They released their first record the same year on the Glow Star label. A second single was released in 1966, but both sold poorly. They then signed to local Chicago label Crash Records, but sales success continued to elude them and Crash folded in 1967. They recorded a tune written by Wes Wells and producer Al Smith entitled "Get It From the Bottom", which was released nationally by Date Records. This turned into a minor R&B (#46) and pop (#56) hit on the Billboard charts beginning in December 1969. The Steelers had no further hit records, but continued to perform and make records until the late 1980s. As the record began gaining traction on the charts, the name band's name caught the attention of the media in Pittsburgh, home of the Pittsburgh Steelers.

Robert Pruter has opined that the "group never made a truly bad record."
