= Steeler =

Steeler may refer to:

== Music ==
- Steeler (American band), a 1981–1984 heavy metal band
  - Steeler (American band album), 1983
- Steeler (German band), a 1981–1988 heavy metal band, or their 1984 debut album
- "Steeler", a song by Judas Priest from British Steel, 1980

== Other uses ==
- Steel worker, a person who works in the process of making steel
- Steeler (G.I. Joe), a character in the G.I. Joe universe
- Steeler (train), on the Pennsylvania Railroad, US

== See also ==
- Stealer
- Stele
- Steel (disambiguation)
- Steel worker (disambiguation)
- Steelers (disambiguation)
