= Men of Steel =

Men of Steel may refer to:

- "Men of Steel" (song), a 1997 song by Shaquille O'Neal, Ice Cube, B-Real, Peter Gunz and KRS-One
- Men of Steel (1926 film), a 1926 American silent drama film
- Men of Steel (1932 film), a 1932 British drama film
- Bill Cracks Down, also known as Men of Steel, a 1937 American action romantic drama film

== See also ==
- Man of Steel (disambiguation)
