= Stahlman Point =

Mountain in Oregon, United States

- Location within Oregon

Highest point
- Elevation: 3,058 ft (932 m)
- Coordinates: 44°42′38″N 122°08′03″W

Geography
- Location: Linn County
- Parent range: Cascades
- Topo map: TopoZone

Geology
- Mountain type: Mountain

Climbing
- Easiest route: Trail

Stahlman Point is a mountain that lies in Linn County, Oregon, in the Willamette National Forest about two miles south of the town of Detroit.

Stahlman Point is best known for being a hiking area. The top provides views of Detroit Lake, the small town of Idanha, and Mt. Jefferson.
