= Iron Baron =

Iron Baron, or a variation of the title, may refer to:

- Iron Baron, South Australia, an iron ore mine
- Iron Baron (ship)
- Bettino Ricasoli (1809–1880), 1st Count of Brolio, 2nd Baron Ricasoli, nicknamed "The Iron Baron"
- Iron Baron, a character from Marvel's Secret Wars, see Hydra
- The Iron Baron (Ninjago), a character in Ninjago

== See also ==
- Iron Duke
- Iron Lady (disambiguation)
- Iron Lord (disambiguation)
