= Metropolitan Borough of Kensington =

Former borough of London

Coordinates: 51.5021°N 0.1951°W

Kensington
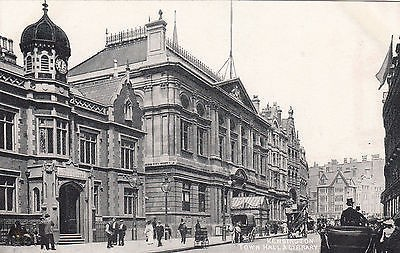
- The old Kensington Town Hall

- Kensington within the County of London
- History
  - Created: 1900
  - Abolished: 1965
  - Succeeded by: Royal Borough of Kensington and Chelsea
- Status: Metropolitan borough (and Royal borough from 1901)
- Government: Kensington Borough Council
  - HQ: Kensington High Street
  - Motto: Quid Nobis Ardui (What is hard for us)
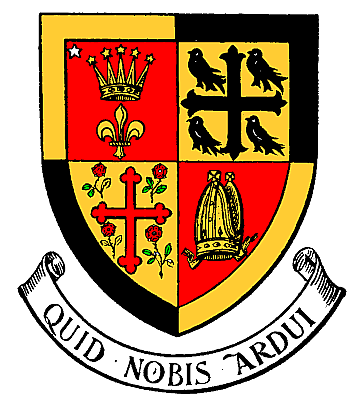
- Coat of arms of the borough council
- Map of borough boundary

The Metropolitan Borough of Kensington was a metropolitan borough in the County of London from 1900 to 1965, which since 1901 was known as the Royal Borough of Kensington, following the death of Queen Victoria, in accordance with her wishes.

== History ==
It bordered Chelsea, Fulham, Hammersmith, Paddington, and Westminster.

It included Kensington, South Kensington, Earls Court, Notting Hill, Brompton and part of Kensal Green.

In 1901 it was granted the status of a royal borough, and therefore from then was also known as the Royal Borough of Kensington. The status was granted after the death of Queen Victoria, in accordance with her wish (she was born at Kensington Palace in the borough).

In 1965 it was amalgamated with the Metropolitan Borough of Chelsea to form the Royal Borough of Kensington and Chelsea.

A number of street signs in the area still bear the designation "Royal Borough of Kensington".

The old Town Hall was demolished "in controversial circumstances" involving an impending conservation order in June 1982.

== Coat of arms ==
The coat of arms is derived from those of the former Lords of the Manor, and that of the parish church, which is dedicated to the Virgin Mary.

== Population and area ==
The Kensington borough covered 2,291 acres (9.3 km^{2}) once part of Kensal New Town (a detached part of Chelsea before 1901) became incorporated. The population of Kensington recorded in the Census, which excludes Kensal New Town before 1901, was:

Kensington Vestry 1801–1899

Year	1801	1811	1821	1831	1841	1851	1861	1871	1881	1891
Population	8,556	10,886	14,428	20,902	26,834	44,053	70,108	120,299	163,151	166,308

Metropolitan Borough 1900–1961

Year	1901	1911	1921	1931	1941	1951	1961
Population	176,628	172,317	175,859	180,677		168,160	171,272

== Politics ==
A map showing the wards of Kensington Metropolitan Borough as they appeared in 1916.

Under the Metropolis Management Act 1855 any parish that exceeded 2,000 ratepayers was to be divided into wards; however the parish of St Mary Abbots Kensington had already been divided into three wards by the Kensington Improvement Act 1851 (14 & 15 Vict. c. cxvi). So the incorporated vestry inherited these wards and assigned vestrymen to them: The Holy Trinity Brompton (27), St John's Notting Hill & St James' Norland (27) and St Mary Abbots (30).

In 1894 as its population had increased the incorporated vestry was re-divided into eight wards (electing vestrymen): Golborne (18), Norland (15), Pembridge (15), Holland (15), Earl's Court (12), Queen's Gate (15), Redcliffe (15) and Brompton (15).

The metropolitan borough was divided into nine wards for elections: Brompton, Earl's Court, Golborne, Holland, Norland, Pembridge, Queen's Gate, Redcliffe and St Charles.

=== Parliament constituency ===
For elections to Parliament, the borough was divided into two constituencies:

- Kensington North
- Kensington South

In 1950 the borough's representation was increased to two and a half seats, when part of it was merged with Chelsea:

- Chelsea
- Kensington North
- Kensington South

In 2010, the constituencies of Kensington North and South were merged to create a single constituency once again and Chelsea was branched off to create a new constituency.

- Kensington
- Chelsea and Fulham
