= Ironman =

Iron Man, Ironman or Ironmen may refer to:

== People ==
- Nathaniel "Iron Man" Avery (1939–1985), American caddie for Arnold Palmer
- Travis Fulton (1977–2021), American mixed martial arts fighter
- Gunnar Graps (1951–2004), Estonian musician
- Mick Murphy (cyclist) (1934–2015), Irish cyclist
- Vallabhbhai Patel (1875–1950), Indian independence activist and former Deputy Prime Minister of India
- Cal Ripken Jr. (born 1960), American Major League Baseball player
- Ivan Stewart (born 1945), American off-road racing driver
- Billy Williams (born 1938), American Major League Baseball player

== Films ==
=== Marvel Cinematic Universe ===
- Tony Stark (Marvel Cinematic Universe), the character as depicted in the media franchise
- Iron Man (2008 film), an American live-action film based on the Marvel character
- Iron Man 2, the 2010 sequel to the film
- Iron Man 3, the 2013 sequel

=== Other films ===
- The Iron Man (serial), a 1924 film serial
- The Iron Man, or A Man of Iron, a 1925 silent film
- The Iron Man (1930 film), an animated film
- Iron Man (1931 film), directed by Tod Browning
- Iron Man (1951 film), based on the novel by W.R. Burnett
- Iron Man, or Tieren, a 1964 Chinese film about Wang Jinxi
- Tetsuo: The Iron Man, a 1989 Japanese film
- Tetsujin 28: The Movie (2005), Japanese film based on the 1956 manga series Tetsujin 28-go
- Bartali: The Iron Man, a 2006 Italian television film co-written and directed by Alberto Negrin
- Iron Man (2009 film), a Chinese film about Wang Jinxi

== Games ==
- Iron Man (video game), 2008, based on the film
- Ironman (computer gaming), a mode in some computer games wherein savescumming (reloading to get a better outcome) or other features such as trading with other players (in multiplayer games) are disabled
- Iron Man VR, a virtual reality video game for the PlayStation VR headset

== Comics ==
- Iron Man, a Marvel Comics superhero
- Iron Man (comic book), the name of several comic book titles featuring the Marvel Comics character
  - List of Iron Man titles
- Iron Man (Canadian comics), a pioneering Canadian comics character
- Tetsujin 28, a character from the manga series that debuted in 1956 Tetsujin 28-go ("Iron Man No. 28")
- Bozo the Iron Man, a character from Quality Comics' series, Smash Comics

== Music ==
=== Albums ===
- Iron Man (Eric Dolphy album), 1963, by Eric Dolphy
- Iron Man: The Best of Black Sabbath, a compilation album by Black Sabbath
- Iron Man (soundtrack), 2008
- Ironman (Ghostface Killah album), 1996, by Ghostface Killah
- The Iron Man: The Musical by Pete Townshend, by Pete Townshend

=== Songs ===
- "Iron Man" (song), 1970, by Black Sabbath
- "Iron Man", by The Tansads
- "The Iron Man", by Tom Paxton

=== Performers ===
- Iron Man (band), an American doom metal band

== Sculpture and statues ==
- Iron:Man, a 1993 sculpture by Antony Gormley, in Birmingham, England
- Iron Man (Buddhist statue), Tibetan statue considered a forgery by experts
- Iron Man (Minnesota statue), a 1987 statue in Chisholm, Minnesota

== Television ==
- Iron Man (anime), a 2010 television series
- Iron Man (TV series), a 1994 animated series
- Iron Man: Armored Adventures, a TV CGI animated series
- Tetsujin 28, a character from the anime series that debuted in 1960 Tetsujin 28-go ("Iron Man No. 28")
- Tetsujin 28-go (2004 TV series), based on the 1956 manga series Tetsujin 28-go
- "Iron Man" Carmichael, alter ego of Lucille Carmichael on three episodes of The Lucy Show
- The Invincible Iron Man, part of 1966 The Marvel Super Heroes cartoon series

== Literature ==
=== Fiction ===
- The Iron Man and the Tin Woman, a 1929 novel by Stephen Leacock
- Iron Man, a 1930 novel by William R. Burnett
- Iron Man, Iron Horse, a 1960 novel by James Keene
- The Iron Man (novel), 1968, by Ted Hughes
- The Iron Man, a 1974 novel by Kay Thorpe
- "The Iron Man", a short story in the 1976 The Iron Man & Other Tales of the Ring by Robert E. Howard
- Ironman, the 19th novel in the Able Team series by Dick Stivers
- Ironman (novel), 1995, by Chris Crutcher
- Iron Man, a 2008 novel by Peter David, a novelization of the 2008 film

=== Non-fiction ===
- Iron Man: The Defiant Reign of Jean Chrétien, a 2003 biography of Canadian Prime Minister Jean Chrétien
- Iron Man: My Journey through Heaven and Hell with Black Sabbath, a 2011 autobiography by Black Sabbath founding member Tony Iommi

=== Magazines ===
- Iron Man (magazine), a bodybuilding and weight-training magazine

== Sports ==
- Ironman Triathlon, a long-distance triathlon
  - Ironman World Championship
  - Ironman 70.3
- Iron man (sports streak), an athlete of unusual physical endurance
- Iron man match, a type of a professional wrestling match
- Ironman curling, an annual outdoor curling event in Manitoba, Canada
- Ironman football, an American football system where player substitutions were limited
  - 1926 Brown Bears football team or "the Iron Men", which used player substitutions sparingly
  - 1939 Iowa Hawkeyes football team, nicknamed the "Ironmen" because a number of Hawkeyes played 60-minute games
- Ironman Raceway, a motocross track in the US
- Ironman (surf lifesaving), a multi-disciplinary surf lifesaving event
- Seattle Ironmen, a 1944–1952 ice hockey franchise in the Pacific Coast Hockey League
- South Wales Ironmen, the name used in the 2017 season by rugby league club West Wales Raiders
- Walsh Jesuit Ironman, a high school wrestling tournament
- Mascot of Danville High School, Danville, Pennsylvania. Usually pluralized as "the Ironmen"

== Watches ==
- Ironman Datalink, a Timex wristwatch introduced in 1997 and marketed in conjunction with the Ironman Triathlon
- Timex Ironman, a digital wristwatch marketed in conjunction with the Ironman Triathlon

== See also ==
- Man of Iron (disambiguation)
- Iron Woman (disambiguation)
- Steelman (disambiguation)
- Iron (disambiguation)
- Man (disambiguation)
