= List of Prison School chapters =

First tankōbon volume cover, featuring Kiyoshi Fujino

The manga series Prison School is written and illustrated by Akira Hiramoto. It began serialization in Kodansha's Weekly Young Magazine on February 7, 2011. Yen Press licensed the series in North America; who publishes the series in omnibus volumes containing two volumes each.

== Volume list ==
No.	Original release date	Original ISBN	English release date	English ISBN
1	June 6, 2011	978-4-06-382043-0	July 21, 2015	978-0-316-34365-7
1. "The Five Boys" (5人の男子, Go-nin no danshi); 2. "The Great Peeping Caper" (ノゾキ大作戦, Nozoki dai sakusen); 3. "Moonstruck" (月の輝く夜に, Tsuki no Kagayaku Yoru ni; "At the Night of Shining Moon"); 4. "Crime and Punishment" (罪と罰, Tsumi to Batsu); 5. "Four Leaves &!" (四つ葉と！, Yotsuba to!); 6. "One Climbed by the Crow's Nest" (カラスの巣の横で, Karasu no Su no Yoko de); 7. "The Five Men of the Wasteland" (荒れ地の5人, Arechi no Gonin); 8. "Doin' Time" (刑務所の中, Keimusho no Naka; "Inside the Jailhouse")
2	October 6, 2011	978-4-06-382091-1	July 21, 2015	978-0-31-634612-2
9. "The Man Who Knew Too Much" (知りすぎていた男, Shiri sugite ita Otoko); 10. "Help!" (ヘルプ！, Herupu!); 11. "The First Mission" (ファースト・ミッション, Fāsuto Misshon); 12. "One Thing I Know About Her" (彼女について私が知っている一つの事柄, Kanojo ni Tsuite Watashi ga Shitte iru Hitotsu no Kotogara); 13. "Training Day" (トレーニングデイ, Torēningudei); 14. "Kiyoshi Returns" (キヨシ・リターン, Kiyoshi Ritān); 15. "Brokeback Prison" (ブロークバック・プリズン, Burōkubakku Purizun); 16. "Underworld" (アンダーワールド, Andāwārudo); 17. "Panic Room" (パニックルーム, Panikkurūmu); 18. "The Four Hundred Blows" (大人は判ってくれない, Otona wa Wakatte Kurenai; "Adults Don't Understand")
3	January 6, 2012	978-4-06-382125-3	November 17, 2015	978-0-31-634613-9
19. "3:10 to Yuma" (3時10分、決断のとき, 3-Ji 10-bu, ketsudan no toki); 20. "Pretty Woman" (プリティ・ウーマン, Puriti Ūman); 21. "The Sacrifice" (サクリファイス, Sakurifaisu); 22. "Sunshine Cleaning" (サンシャイン・クリーニング, Sanshain Kurīningu); 23. "Tomorrow Never Dies" (トゥモロー・ネバー・ダイ, To~umorō Nebā Dai); 24. "Midnight Express" (ミッドナイト・エクスプレス, Middonaito Ekusupuresu); 25. "The Great Escape" (THE GREAT ESCAPE); 26. "The Getaway" (ゲッタウェイ, Gettau~ei); 27. "Take Me to Sumo" (私をスモーに連れてって, Watashi o Sumō ni Tsuretette); 28. "No Longer Human" (人間失格, Ningen Shikkaku)
4	April 6, 2012	978-4-06-382159-8	November 17, 2015	978-0-316-34612-2
29. "Contempt" (軽蔑, Keibetsu); 30. "The Verdict" (評決, Hyōketsu); 31. "Unforgiven" (許されざる者, Yurusarezaru mono); 32. "Sign" (サイン, Sain); 33. "Rebel Without a Cause" (理由ある反抗, Riyū aru Hankō); 34. "Operation" (オペレーション, Operēshon); 35. "La Dolce Vita" (甘い生活, Amai Seikatsu); 36. "The Secret" (秘密, Himitsu); 37. "Giant" (ジャイアンツ, Jaiantsu); 38. "Ali" (ALI)
5	July 6, 2012	978-4-06-382195-6	March 22, 2016	978-0-31-634616-0
39. "Hana's Counterattack" (逆襲の花, Gyakushū no Hana); 40. "Paths of Glory!" (激突！, Gekitotsu!); 41. "Splash" (スプラッシュ, Supurasshu); 42. "Meikotouille" (副会長のおいしいレストラン, Fuku Kaichō no Oishī Resutoran; "Chairman's Delicious Restaurant"); 43. "Not One Less" (あの子を探して, Ano Ko o Sagashite); 44. "The Claim" (めぐり逢う大地, Meguri au Daichi); 45. "The Long Goodbye" (ロング・ グッドバイ, Rongu Guddobai); 46. "Breathless" (勝手にしやがれ, Katte ni Shiyagare); 47. "Diary of the Dead" (ダイアリー・オブ・ザ・デッド, Daiarī obu za Deddo); 48. "Go" (GO)
6	November 6, 2012	978-4-06-382224-3	March 22, 2016	978-0-31-634617-7
49. "Phone" (ボイス, Boisu; "Voice"); 50. "Unstoppable" (アンストッパブル, Ansutoppaburu); 51. "Talk to Her" (卜ーク・トゥ・ハー, Tōku to~u Hā); 52. "Confessions" (告白, Kokuhaku); 53. "Buried" (リミット, Rimitto; "Limit"); 54. "Bring It On!" (チアーズ！, Chiāzu!; "Cheers!"); 55. "The Fall" (ザ・フオール, Za Fōru); 56. "The Warlords / The Blood Brothers" (ウォーロード/ 男たちの誓い, U~ōrōdo/ Otoko-tachi no Chikai); 57. "Over the Top" (オーバー・ザ・トップ, Ōbā za Toppu); 58. "Mission: 10 Minutes" (ミッション：10ミニッツ, Misshon: 10 Minittsu)
7	February 6, 2013	978-4-06-382261-8	July 19, 2016	978-0-31-634618-4
59. "Vertigo" (めまい, Memai); 60. "Full Hairy Jacket" (フルメタル・那毛, Furumetaru Nake); 61. "Liquid Sky" (体液がいっぱい, Taieki ga Ippai); 62. "Letter from Chiyo Jima" (日本一切ない手紙, Nihon'ichi setsunai tegami); 63. "The Prisoners' Last Meal" (囚人達の晩餐会, Shūjin-tachi no bansan-kai); 64. "Write Through Tomorrow!" (明日に向かって書け！, Ashita ni mukatte kake!); 65. "Sacco and Vanzetti" (死刑台のメロディ, Shikei-dai no merodi; "Death Penalty Melody"); 66. "Paycheck" (ペイチェック消された記憶, Peichekku kesareta kioku; "Paycheck Erased Memory"); 67. "Kiyoshi's Choice" (もしもお尻が選べたら, Moshimo oshiriga erabetara; "If You Can Choose Your Butt"); 68. "It's a Wonderful Butt" (素晴らしき尻哉、人生！, Subarashiki shiri Kana, jinsei!)
8	May 2, 2013	978-4-06-382302-8	July 19, 2016	978-0-31-650264-1
69. "Eryngii Brockovich" (エリンギ・ブロコビッチ, Eringi Burokobitchi); 70. "Training Day" (トレーニング・デイ, Torēningu Dei); 71. "Blood Diamond" (ブラッド・ダイヤモンド, Buraddo Daiyamondo); 72. "Scissorhands" (シザー・ハンズ, Shizā Hanzu); 73. "A Night in Nude" (ヌードの夜, Nūdo no yoru); 74. "In & Out" (IN & OUT); 75. "Kiss Kiss Bang Bang" (キスキス・バンバン, Kisukisu Banban); 76. "The Long Kiss Goodnight" (ロング キス グッドナイト, Rongu kisu guddonaito); 77. "G.I. Samurai" (センゴク自衛隊, Sengoku Jieitai; "Sengoku Self-Defense Force"); 78. "Near Dark" (月夜の出来事, Tsukiyo no dekigoto; "Moonlit Night Events")
9	July 5, 2013	978-4-06-382320-2	November 22, 2016	978-0-31-655861-7
79. "Morning Expulsion" (退学の朝, Taigaku no asa); 80. "Violent Cup" (その男、パンイチにつき, Sono otoko, Panichi ni tsuki; "About That Man, Panichi"); 81. "Cool Hand Kiyoshi" (暴力&脱獄, Bōryoku & datsugoku; "Violence & Jailbreak"); 82. "10 Things I Love About You" (恋のからさわぎ, Koi no kara sawagi; "Much Ado About Love"); 83. "High and Low" (天国と地獄, Tengoku to jigoku); 84. "Always in My Mind" (愛と憎悪の嵐, Ai to zōo no arashi; "Storm of Love and Hatred"); 85. "Taxi Driver" (TAXI DRIVER); 86. "Vengeance Is Mine" (復讐するは我にあり, Fukushū suru ha wareni ari); 87. "Mad Wax" (マッドワックス, Maddowakkusu); 88. "The Girl Can't Help It" (女はそれを我慢できない, On'na wa sore o gaman dekinai)
10	October 4, 2013	978-4-06-382359-2	November 22, 2016	978-0-31-644287-9
89. "When Mari Met Prison" (囚人たちの予感, Shūjin-tachi no yokan; "The Prisoners' Premonition"); 90. "A Better Tomorrow" (女たちの挽歌, On'na-tachi no banka; "Women's Song"); 91. "I Can Hear the President's Song" (生徒会長の歌が聞こえる, Seito kaichō no uta ga kikoeru); 92. "Shall We Guard?" (Shall we 看守？, Shall we kanshu?); 93. "Totally...Like That" (すっかり‥‥その気で, Sukkari‥‥ sonoke de); 94. "Pay It Forward" (ペイ・フォワード, Pei fowādo); 95. "The Girl Who Leapt Through Time" (時をかける少女, Toki o kakeru shōjo); 96. "Burst Classroom" (爆裂教室, Bakuretsu Kyōshitsu); 97. "Life Is Beautiful" (ライフ・イズ・ビューティフル, Raifu Izu Byūtifuru); 98. "Woman of Steel" (ウーマン・オブ・スティール, Ūman obu Sutīru)
11	December 6, 2013	978-4-06-382387-5	March 21, 2017	978-0-31-655863-1
99. "The Woman Who Sang" (耳に残るは君の歌声, Mimi ni nokoru ha kimi no utagoe); 100. "The Invitation" (誘う女, Sasouon'na; "To Die For"); 101. "The Second Kiss" (2番手のキス, 2-Bante no kisu); 102. "Terms of Shrimpdearment" (愛と追憶のエビ, Ai to tsuioku no ebi); 103. "The Secret Garden" (秘密の花園, Himitsu no hanazono); 104. "Crow Day Afternoon" (鴉たちの午後, Karasu-tachi no gogo); 105. "Pet Cemetery" (ペット・セメタリー, Petto semetarī); 106. "Black Monday" (ブラック・マンデー, Burakku mandē); 107. "Mr. Lonely" (ミスター・ロンリー, Misutā ronrī); 108. "I Wanna Hug You" (抱きしめたい, Dakishimetai)
12	March 6, 2014	978-4-06-382432-2	March 21, 2017	978-1-97-532625-8
109. "Return of the Kiyoshi" (キヨシの帰還, Kiyoshi no kikan); 110. "The Accused" (告発の行方, Kokuhatsu no yukue); 111. "The Gift of the Swordswoman" (剣士の贈り物, Kenshi no okurimono); 112. "The Queen" (The Queen); 113. "Be with You" (いま、会いに行きます, Ima, ai ni ikimasu); 114. "The Hana Kiyoshi Saw That Day" (あの花の怒りをキヨシはまだ知らない, Ano hana no ikari o Kiyoshi wa mada shiranai); 115. "Things You Can Tell Just by Looking at Her" (彼女を見ればわかること, Kanojo o mireba wakaru koto); 116. "Hand-Drunk Love" (ハンドドランク・ラブ, Handodoranku rabu); 117. "The Jugs Country" (大いなる胸部, Ōinaru kyōbu); 118. "Dreams for Sale" (夢売るふたり, Yume uru futari)
13	May 2, 2014	978-4-06-382461-2	June 20, 2017	978-0-316-34618-4
119. "High and Low" (世界で一番不運で幸せな少年, Sekai de ichiban fuun de shiawasena shōnen; "The Luckiest and Happiest Boy in the World"); 120. "Kiss-Ass" (キッス・アス, Kissu asu); 121. "Entrapment" (エントラップメント, Entorappumento); 122. "The Bad Sleep Well" (悪い奴ほどよく笑う, Warui yatsu hodo yoku warau); 123. "Invictus" (Invictus); 124. "Wasted Youth" (悲しみの青春, Kanashimi no seishun); 125. "The Moment of Truth" (真実の瞬間, Shinjitsu no shunkan); 126. "Men On a Ledge" (崖っぷちの男たち, Gakeppuchi no otoko-tachi); 127. "Innocent Voices" (イノセント・ボーイズ, Inosento bōizu); 128. "Catch Me If You Can" (キャッチ・ミー・イフ・ユー・キャン, Kyatchi mī ifu yū Kyan)
14	August 6, 2014	978-4-06-382499-5	June 20, 2017	978-1-97-532860-3
129. "Witness" (目撃者, Mokugeki-sha); 130. "Vantage Point" (バンテージ・ポイント, Bantēji pointo); 131. "The Right Stuff" (ライトスタッフ, Raitosutaffu); 132. "Snow White" (スノーホワイト, Sunōhowaito); 133. "Seeking Justice" (正義のゆくえ, Seigi no yukue); 134. "Konshin" (渾身, Konshin); 135. "All About My Sister" (オール・アバウト・マイ・シスター, Ōru abauto Mai shisutā); 136. "Goldfinger" (ゴールド・フィンガー, Gōrudo fingā); 137. "The Prestige" (プレステージ, Puresutēji); 138. "Woman On Top" (ウーマン・オン・トップ, Ūman on toppu)
15	November 6, 2014	978-4-06-382525-1	November 7, 2017	—
139. "The Kiyoshi Conference" (キヨシ会議, Kiyoshi kaigi); 140. "For a Cop-a-Feel" (危険なささやき, Kiken'na sasayaki); 141. "She, Her Sis, and Kiyoshi" (ふたりの女とひとりの男, Futari no on'na to hitori no otoko); 142. "Pandora's Box" (パンドラの箱, Pandoranohako); 143. "Dream to Believe" (ドリーム・トゥ・ビリーヴ, Dorīmu to~u birīvu); 144. "The Bird" (The Bird); 145. "The Third Girl" (第三の女, Dai san no on'na); 146. "Silent Service" (沈黙の戦艦, Chinmoku no senkan); 147. "The Ugly Truth" (男と女の不都合な真実, Otokotoon'nanofutsugōnashinjitsu); 148. "Sleeping Beasty" (眠れる森の野獣, Nemurerumori no nokemono)
16	March 6, 2015	978-4-06-382570-1	November 7, 2017	—
149. "The Prison's Longest Day" (監獄のいちばん長い日, Kangoku no ichiban nagai hi); 150. "The Quiet Man" (静かなる男, Shizukanaru otoko); 151. "Demolition Man" (デモリションマン, Demorishon man); 152. "Remember with Honor" (きっと忘れない, Kittowasurenai); 153. "What Dreams May Come" (野獣が見た夢, Yajū ga mita yume; "Dreams of Beasts"); 154. "Soulful Kitchen" (ソウルフル・キッチン, Sōrufuru kitchin); 155. "Les Misérables" (レ・ミゼラブル, Re mizeraburu); 156. "For Whose Sake?" (誰がために, Daregatameni); 157. "October Sky" (遠い空の向こうに, Tōisoranomukōni); 158. "When Mari Was There" (思い出の万里, Omoide no banri)
17	June 5, 2015	978-4-06-382643-2	March 13, 2018	—
159. "Pride and Prejudice" (プライドと偏見, Puraido to henken); 160. "Black Box" (仄暗い箱の底から, Honogurai hako no soko kara); 161. "Whisper of the Heart" (耳をすませば, Mimi o sumaseba); 162. "Nobody Knows" (誰も知らない, Daremoshiranai); 163. "Inception" (インセプション, Insepushon); 164. "Snake Eyes" (スネーク・アイズ, Sunēku aizu); 165. "Lethal Weapon" (リーサル・ウェポン, Rīsaru u~epon); 166. "Full Throttle" (フルスロットル, Furusurottoru); 167. "The Old Jockey" (騎手物語, Kishu monogatari); 168. "My Room" (マイ・ルーム, Mai rūmu)
18	August 6, 2015	978-4-06-382647-0	March 13, 2018	—
169. "Two Rode Together" (馬上の人, Moue no hito); 170. "Audition" (オーディション, Ōdishon); 171. "Into Darkness" (イントゥ・ダークネス, Into~u dākunesu); 172. "Skyfall" (スカイ・フォール, Sukai fōru); 173. "Kiss of the Snake Woman" (蛇女のキス, Hebi on'na no kisu); 174. "The Majestic" (マジェスティック, Majesutikku); 175. "A Star is Born" (スタア誕生, Sutātanjō); 176. "Before I Go to Sleep" (リピーテッド, Ripīteddo); 177. "It All Began When I Met You" (すべてが君に逢えたから, Subete ga kimi ni aetakara); 178. "We Are (Not) Alone." (WE ARE (NOT) ALONE.)
19	December 4, 2015	978-4-06-382714-9	June 26, 2018	—
179. "The Unsetting Sun" (沈まぬ太陽, Shizumanu taiyō); 180. "Bra Hunter" (ブラ・ハンター, Bura hantā); 181. "Terminator: Genesis" (新起動：ジェニシス, Shin kidō: Jenishisu); 182. "The Invention of Shingo" (シンゴの不思議な発見, Shingo no fushigina hakken); 183. "Changeling" (チェンジリング, Chenjiringu); 184. "Abnormal Activity" (アブノーマル・アクティビティ, Abunōmaru akutibiti); 185. "Still Wedging" (食い込んでも食い込んでも, Kuikonde mo kuikon demo); 186. "The Friend Connection" (フレンド・コネクション, Furendo konekushon); 187. "Girlfight" (ガールファイト, Gārufaito); 188. "The Devil Wears Street Clothes" (私服を着た悪魔, Shifuku o kita akuma)
20	March 4, 2016	978-4-06-382741-5	June 26, 2018	—
189. "Ground Illusion" (グラウンド・イリュージョン, Guraundo iryūjon); 190. "Panties' Labyrinth" (パンツ・ラビリンス, Pantsu rabirinsu); 191. "The Unworn" (はかない期待, Hakanai kitai); 192. "Master of the Game" (ゲームの達人, Gēmu no tatsujin); 193. "Drink Wear Love" (飲んで、被って、恋をして, Nonde, kōmutte, koi o shite); 194. "The Unforgiven" (許されざる者たち, Yurusarezarumono-tachi); 195. "Extremely Sad and Incredibly Tough" (ものすごくかなしくて、ありえないほど辛い, Monosugoku kanashikute, arienai hodo tsurai); 196. "The Anthem of the Heart" (心が叫びたがっているんだ, Kokoro ga sakebita gatte iru nda); 197. "The Story of Men and Dreams" (夢を諦めきれない男たち, Yume o akirame kirenai otoko-tachi); 198. "The Fourth Awakens" (フォースの覚醒, Fōsu no kakusei)
21	June 6, 2016	978-4-06-382804-7	October 30, 2018	—
199. "Ant Boy" (アントボーイ, Antobōi); 200. "The Man with the Golden Gun" (黄金銃を持つ男, Ōgon jū o motsu otoko); 201. "The Bear" (大熊物語, Ōkuma monogatari); 202. "The Mask" (マスク, Masuku); 203. "The Longest Schoolyard" (ロンゲスト・スクールヤード, Ron gesuto sukūruyādo); 204. "A Dangerous Method" (危険なメソッド, Kiken'na mesoddo); 205. "Dead (and Hard) Again" (愛と死の間で, Aitoshinoaidade); 206. "Close Encounters of the Dirty Kind" (未知との遭遇, Michitonosōgū); 207. "Bitch Perfect" (ビッチ・パーフェクト, Bitchi pāfekuto); 208. "Kiyoshi's" (KIYOSHI'S)
22	August 5, 2016	978-4-06-382836-8	October 30, 2018	—
209. "Heaven Can't Wait. Maybe..." (天国は待ってくれない, Tengoku wa matte kurenai); 210. "The Love Guru" (愛の伝道師, Ai no dendōshi); 211. "My Dangling Clementine" (荒野の決闘, Kōya no kettō); 212. "Invasion of Asstro-Monster" (怪獣大戦争, Kaijū daisensō); 213. "The Counselure" (悪口の法則, Waruguchi no hōsoku); 214. "Clap of Faith" (奇跡を呼ぶ男, Kiseki o yobu otoko); 215. "Bra Girl" (ブラガール, Buragāru); 216. "Help! With the Idols" (ヘルプ！ 彼女はアイドル, Herupu! Kanojo wa aidoru); 217. "The Towering Inferno" (タワーリング・インフェルノ, Tawāringu inferuno); 218. "Paycheck" (ペイ・チェック, Pei chekku)
23	November 4, 2016	978-4-06-382872-6	February 19, 2019	—
219. "Hide and Seek" (ハイアンドシーク, Hai ando shīku); 220. "Stairway to Heaven" (天国への怪談, Tengoku e no kaidan); 221. "The Imitation Game" (イミテーション・ゲーム, Imitēshon gēmu); 222. "All You Need Is Seal" (オール・ユー・ニード・イズ・シール, Ōru yū nīdo Izu shīru); 223. "Gone Girl" (ゴーン・ガール, Gōn gāru); 224. "Sister Act" (天使にラブ・ソングを, Tenshi ni rabu songu o); 225. "A Bizarre Story of Love" (愛のメモリー, Ai no memorī); 226. "Hachimitsu From Above" (天空からの招待状, Tenkū kara no jōtaijō); 227. "I Can Hear the Shadow President's Song" (裏生徒会長の歌が聞こえる, Uraseitokai-chō no uta ga kikoeru); 228. "Begin Again" (はじまりのうた, Hajimari no uta)
24	March 6, 2017	978-4-06-382960-0	February 19, 2019	—
229. "The Revenant" (レヴェナント: 蘇りし者, Revenanto: Yomigaerishi Mono); 230. "I Have to Lick New Shoes" (新しい靴を舐めなくちゃ, Atarashī kutsu o namenakucha); 231. "Bicentennial Andre" (アンドレーNDR114, Andorē NDR 114); 232. "God Save the Shoes" (私が靴を気にするワケ, Watashi ga kutsu o kinisuru wake; "Why I Care About Shoes"); 233. "Like Asura" (阿修羅のごとく, Ashura no gotoku); 234. "Mindscape" (記憶探偵と鍵のかかった少女, Kioku tantei to kagi no kakatta shōjo; "Memory Detective and Locked Girl"); 235. "Invincible Hair" (髪に選ばれし無敵の女, Kami ni eraba reshi muteki no on'na; "Invincible Woman Chosen For Hair"); 236. "Somebody" (何者, Nanimono); 237. "Happy & Glorious" (Happy&Glorious); 238. "Fireworks" (HANA-BI)
25	May 2, 2017	978-4-06-382965-5	June 18, 2019	—
239. "The Silence of the Lambs" (羊たちの沈黙, Hitsujitachinochinmoku); 240. "Black Hawk Down" (ブラックホーク・ダウン, Burakku hōku daun); 241. "Postwoman in the Flowers" (花の郵便配達, Hana no yūbin haitatsu); 242. "Killing Me Softly" (キリング・ミー・ソフトリー, Kiringu mī sofutorī); 243. "Only Yesterday" (おもひでぽろぽろ, O mo hi de poroporo); 244. "The Reader" (愛を読むひと, Ai o yomu hito); 245. "The Barbecue Road of Honor" (栄光の焼き肉ロード, Eikō no yakiniku rōdo); 246. "The Box" (ボックス！, Bokkusu!); 247. "While the Woman Is Throwing" (女が投げる時, On'na ga nageru toki); Special Chapter: "Special Collaboration Manga "Big Bad High School VS. Prison School"" (特別編 SPコラボ漫画「巨悪学園 VS. 監獄学園」, Tokubetsu-hen SP korabo manga `kyoaku gakuen VS. Kangoku gakuen')
26	August 4, 2017	978-4-06-510425-5	June 18, 2019	—
248. "The Postman Always Knocks Twice" (郵便配達は二度ハコを鳴らす, Yūbin haitatsu wa nido Hako o narasu); 249. "The Long Excuse" (永い言い訳, Nagai iiwake); 250. "Flower and Sword" (花いくさ, Hana iku sa; "Hana Wars"); 251. "The Princess and the Frog" (プリンセスと魔法のキス, Purinsesu tomahōnokisu); 252. "Your Domme." (君の縄。, Kimi no nawa.); 253. "Reverse" (リバース, Ribāsu); 254. "ShiKO" (SiKO); 255. "Louder Than Moms" (母の残像, Haha no zanzō); 256. "Quiz Show" (クイズ・ショウ, Kuizu shō); 257. "The Other Kurihara Girl" (栗原家の姉妹, Kurihara-ka no shimai)
27	November 6, 2017	978-4-06-510425-5	October 29, 2019	—
258. "You're Not You" (さよならの代わりに, Sayonara no kawarini); 259. "One Wonderful Saturday" (素晴らしき土曜日, Subarashiki doyōbi); 260. "Airport" (大空港, Dai kūkō); 261. "Bicycle Thieves" (自転車泥棒, Jitensha dorobō); 262. "The Idiots (Will Be Fine)" (きっと、うまくいく, Kitto, umaku iku); 263. "This Is It" (THIS IS IT); 264. "Rec." (REC/レック, Rekku); 265. "Phantom Lady" (幻の女, Maboroshi no on'na); 266. "Kinky's Delivery Service" (マゾの宅急便, Mazo no takkyūbin); 267. "Storm of Love" (愛の嵐, Ai no arashi)
28	April 6, 2018	978-4-06-510425-5	October 29, 2019	—
268. "Inside Skirt" (インサイド・スカート, Insaido sukāto); 269. "Run Meiko Run" (ラン・メイコ・ラン, Ran Meiko ran); 270. "The Secret Life of Pervs" (あなたになら言える秘密のこと, Anata ni nara ieru himitsu no koto); 271. "The Theory of Everything" (The Theory of Everything); 272. "The Water Traveler" (水の旅人, Mizu no tabibito); 273. "Enma" (エンマ, Enma); 274. "The Last Judgement" (最後の審判, Saigo no shinpan); 275. "Daughter" (娘よ, Musume yo); 276. "No Regrets For Our Youth" (わが青春に悔いなし, Waga seishun ni kui nashi); 277. "The Trial's End" (俺たちに明日はない(終わり), Oretachi ni asu ha nai (owari); "We Don't Have a Tomorrow (End)"); 277.5. "End of Play" (プレイ終了, Purei shūryō)
