= The Iron Men =

The Iron Men may refer to:

- 1926 Brown Bears football team, often called "the Iron Men"
- The Iron Men (album), an album by Woody Shaw
- Toledo Iron Men, a minor league baseball team

== See also ==
- Iron Man (disambiguation)
